= Judex (disambiguation) =

Judex is the name of a fictional French vigilante hero.

Judex may also refer to:

- Judex (1916 film), the character's debut film
- La Nouvelle Mission de Judex (1918), a sequel to the debut film
- Judex (1934 film), also based on the character
- Judex (1963 film), also based on the character
- Judex Lefou, a Mauritian hurdler

== See also ==
- Judge (disambiguation)
