= Judex =

Fictional French vigilante hero

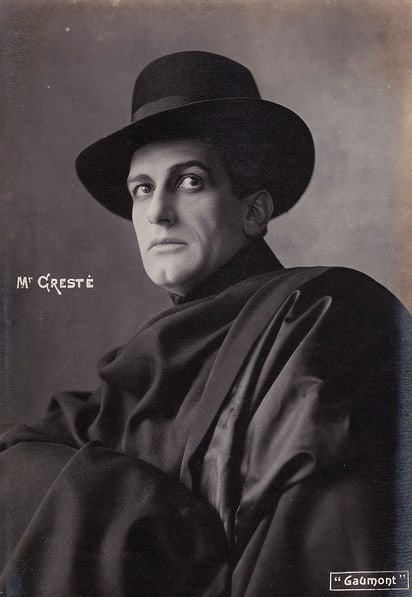
- René Cresté as Judex

Publication information
- Created by: Louis Feuillade; Arthur Bernède

In-story information
- Alter ego: Jacques de Trémeuse
- Notable aliases: M. Vallières
- Abilities: Expert detective; Skilled marksman and hand-to-hand combatant; Master of disguise; Master of stealth

Judex (real name Jacques de Trémeuse) is a fictional French vigilante hero created by Louis Feuillade and Arthur Bernède for the 1916 silent film serial of the same name. Judex (whose name is Latin for "judge") is a mysterious avenger who dresses in black and wears a wide-brimmed hat and cloak. He was possibly conceived as a heroic version of the criminal character Fantômas, about whom Feuillade had directed the popular 1913 serial Fantômas. The character has since appeared in other films, in novels, on stage and in comic books. Judex may have been an inspiration for the American pulp hero The Shadow, who was himself an inspiration for Batman.

== Creation ==
Louis Feuillade had made two earlier serials, Fantômas (1913) and Les Vampires (1915–1916), about cunning criminals. Though popular with audiences, the serials drew criticism for glorifying outlaws. Feuillade opted for a lighter approach for his next film, celebrating the adventures of a vigilante. Judex, by contrast, was a heroic persona, but one who had all of the sinister trappings of the flamboyant villains who were popular at the time.

== Character description ==
After his father committed suicide as a result of being ruined by the villainous banker Favraux, Jacques de Trémeuse adopted the guise of Judex and worked to bring down Favraux. The character anticipated later pulp heroes and superheroes in many respects. He was a masterful fighter and an expert at disguise, and boasted a secret headquarters. In the subterranean passages beneath a ruined castle Judex had a base outfitted with technological gadgets. He also had a secret identity: "Judex" (the Latin word for judge) was merely a nom de guerre he had adopted in his quest for revenge. The story bore several similarities with The Count of Monte Cristo.

While in the first serial Judex acted solely out of personal revenge, the second one, La Nouvelle Mission de Judex (lit. "The New Mission of Judex"), showed him acting as a vigilante and a defender of the innocent.

== Films ==
The first text episode of Judex was published in the 12 January 1917, issue of Le Petit Parisien, a week before the debut of the film Judex on 19 January. Each text episode was published before the corresponding film episode, which built up anticipation. The text episodes ran from 12 January to April 6, and the film episodes ran from 19 January to 7 April. The international release of the serial was delayed until late 1917 in Europe. A North American release did not occur until the Canadian Film Institute's National Film Theatre arranged a screening in February 1965.

A sequel serial titled La Nouvelle Mission de Judex (lit. "New Mission Of Judex", or The Further Exploits of Judex in Europe) ran in Le Petit Parisien from 11 January to 4 April 1918, and the film episodes ran from 25 January to 15 April.

A remake, also named Judex, was made in 1934, directed by Maurice Champreux, and starring René Ferté as Judex. Another remake, again named Judex, was filmed in 1963 by director Georges Franju. American magician Channing Pollock played the title role.

=== Cast ===
Character	Film			
Character	Judex (1916)	La Nouvelle Mission de Judex (1918)	Judex (1934)	Judex (1963)
Judex/Jacques de Trémeuse	René Cresté	René Cresté	René Ferté	Channing Pollock
Favraux, the banker	Louis Leubas	Louis Leubas	Alexandre Mihalesco	Michel Vitold
Jacqueline	Yvette Andréyor	Yvette Andréyor	Louise Lagrange	Édith Scob
Alfred Cocantin	Marcel Lévesque	Marcel Lévesque	Marcel Vallée	Jacques Jouanneau
Roger de Trémeuse	Édouard Mathé	Édouard Mathé	Jean Lefebvre	
Little Jean	Olinda Mano	Olinda Mano	Jean Borelli	
Diana Monti	Musidora		Blanche Bernis	Francine Bergé
Robert Moralès	Jean Devalde		Nino Constantini	Théo Sarapo

== Books ==
=== Novels ===
Judex: published in 1917, by Arthur Bernède and Louis Feuillade, based on the 1916 serial, and reissued in 1925 as Les Nouveaux Exploits de Judex (Judex's New Adventures). Black Coat Press published an adaptation by Rick Lai in 2012.

La Nouvelle Mission de Judex: published in 1919, by Arthur Bernède and Louis Feuillade, based on the 1918 serial, and reissued in 1925 as La Dernière Incarnation de Judex (Judex's Last Incarnation). Black Coat Press published an adaptation by Rick Lai in 2013, titled The Return of Judex.

In 2013, Black Coat Press published a new screenplay by Robert L. Robinson, Jr., of a new adaptation of the Judex character.

=== Short stories ===
- Tales of the Shadowmen, Volume 1: The Modern Babylon. Published in 2005, Judex appears in two short stories, "Mask of the Monster" by Matthew Baugh, and "Penumbra" by Chris Roberson.
- Tales of the Shadowmen, Volume 2: Gentlemen of the Night. Published in 2006, Judex appears in one short story, "Lost and Found" by Jean-Marc Lofficier.
- Tales of the Shadowmen, Volume 3: Danse Macabre. Published in 2007, Judex appears in one short story, "Two Hunters" by Robert L. Robinson, Jr.
- Tales of the Shadowmen, Volume 7: Femmes Fatales. Published in 2010, Judex appears in two short stories, "What Rough Beast" by Matthew Baugh and "Faces of Fear" by Matthew Dennion.
- Tales of the Shadowmen, Volume 8: Agents Provocateurs. Published in 2011, Judex appears in a short story "The Affair of the Necklace Revisited" by Jean-Marc Lofficier & Randy Lofficier, as well as an image, "Judex vs Belphegor" by John Gallagher.
- Tales of the Shadowmen, Volume 11: Force Majeure. Published in 2014, Judex appears in a short story "A Fistful of Judexes" by Nigel Malcolm.
- Tales of the Shadowmen, Volume 12: Carte Blanche. Published in 2015, Judex appears in a short story "Justice and the Beast" by Christofer Nigro.
- Tales of the Shadowmen, Volume 14: Coup de Grace. Published in 2017, Judex appears in a short story "Kindred Beasts" by Christofer Nigro.
- Tales of the Shadowmen, Volume 15: Trompe l'Oeil. Published in 2018, Judex appears in two short stories "Enemies of the People" by Nigel Malcolm, and "The Anti-Adonis Alliance" by Christofer Nigro.
- Night of the Nyctalope. Published in 2012, Judex appears in one short story "Justice and Power" by Christofer Nigro.
- The Shadow of Judex. Published in 2013, it contains all Judex short stories and 16 additional ones.

=== Reference books ===
Shadowmen: Heroes and Villains of French Pulp Fiction. Published in 2003, by Jean-Marc Lofficier and Randy Lofficier, and by Black Coat Press, it is an encyclopedic guide to some of the most important characters from French fiction, including Judex.

== Comics ==
French comic magazine Hurrah!. Published by Editions Mondiales in June 1940 began a comic series of Judex, which was in actuality, a French translation of the American syndicated Shadow comic strip.

As an homage, writer Matt Fraction featured Judex as a member of a team of European superheroes of the early 20th century, in a 2012 issue of The Defenders from Marvel Comics.

== See also ==
- Judex
- La Nouvelle Mission de Judex (1918 film)
- Judex (1934 film)
- Judex (1963 film)
- List of film serials
- List of film serials by studio
