= Théâtre de Cluny =

Coordinates: 48.85055°N 2.34501°E

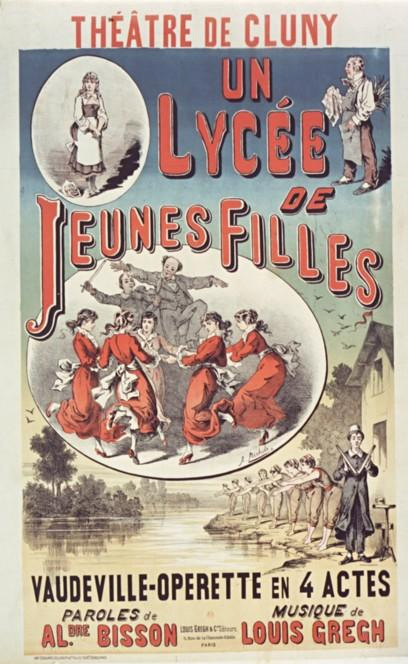
Un lycée de jeunes filles (1882)

The théâtre de Cluny (French pronunciation: [teɑtʁ də klyni]) or théâtre Cluny was an entertainment venue located at 71 boulevard Saint-Germain in the 5th arrondissement of Paris, inaugurated in 1864 and closed in 1989.

== Productions (selection) ==
- 1869 : Le Juif Polonais, opera in three acts
- 1870 : Père et mari, 3-act prose drama, 21 June
- 1879 : Claudie by George Sand, 17 September
- 1888 : Le Docteur Jojo by Albert Carré, 16 March
- 1888 : Le Gant rouge, by Edmond Rostand, one-act comedy, 24 August
- 1893 : Boubouroche by Georges Courteline, September
- 1917 : Chantecoq by Arthur Bernède and Aristide Bruant, 10 October
- 1901 : La Dame du commissaire, comedy in three acts, 20 April
- 1923 : Judex by Arthur Bernède after the movie Judex by Louis Feuillade and Arthur Bernède, 14 August
- 1929 : Ma veuve s'amuse by José de Bérys and Benjamin Rabier

== Bibliography ==
- Philippe Chauveau, Les Théâtres parisiens disparus (1402-1986), éd. de l'Amandier, Paris, 1999 (ISBN 978-2-907649-30-8)
- Fédération des sociétés historiques et archéologiques de Paris et de l'Ile-de-France, « Le théâtre de Cluny, acte I et II » dans Paris et Ile-de-France, vol. 52, Librairie C. Klincksieck, 2001, (p. 251-281)
