= The Two Girls (1921 film) =

1921 film

- Directed by: Louis Feuillade
- Written by: Louis Feuillade (novel and screenplay)
- Starring: Sandra Milovanoff; Olinda Mano; Violette Jyl
- Cinematography: Maurice Champreux; Léon Morizet
- Music by: Jacques Brilloin; Marcel Delannoy; Jean Grémillon
- Production company: Gaumont
- Distributed by: Gaumont
- Release date: 28 January 1921
- Country: France
- Languages: Silent; French intertitles

The Two Girls (French: Les deux gamines) is a 1921 French silent film serial directed by Louis Feuillade and starring Sandra Milovanoff, Olinda Mano, and Violette Jyl. Based on a melodramatic novel, it was remade twice in 1936 and 1951.

The film's sets were designed by the art director Robert-Jules Garnier.

== Cast ==
- Sandra Milovanoff as Ginette
- Olinda Mano as Gaby
- Violette Jyl as Lisette Fleury, leur mère
- Alice Tissot as Flora Bènazer
- Gaston Michel as Le grand-pére Bertal
- Fernand Herrmann as Pierre Mannin, le pére
- Lugane as Mlle. de Bersanges
- Édouard Mathé as M. de Bersanges
- Henri-Amédée Charpentier as Bénazer, le fripier
- Georges Martel as Maugars, complice de Bénazer
- Jeanne Rollette as Joséphine, la servante
- Blanche Montel as Blanche
- René Poyen as René
- Laure Mouret as Sephora Bénazer
- Madame Gordenko as Soeur Véronique

== Bibliography ==
- James L. Limbacher. Haven't I seen you somewhere before?: Remakes, sequels, and series in motion pictures and television, 1896-1978. Pierian Press, 1979.
