= Parisette =

1921 film

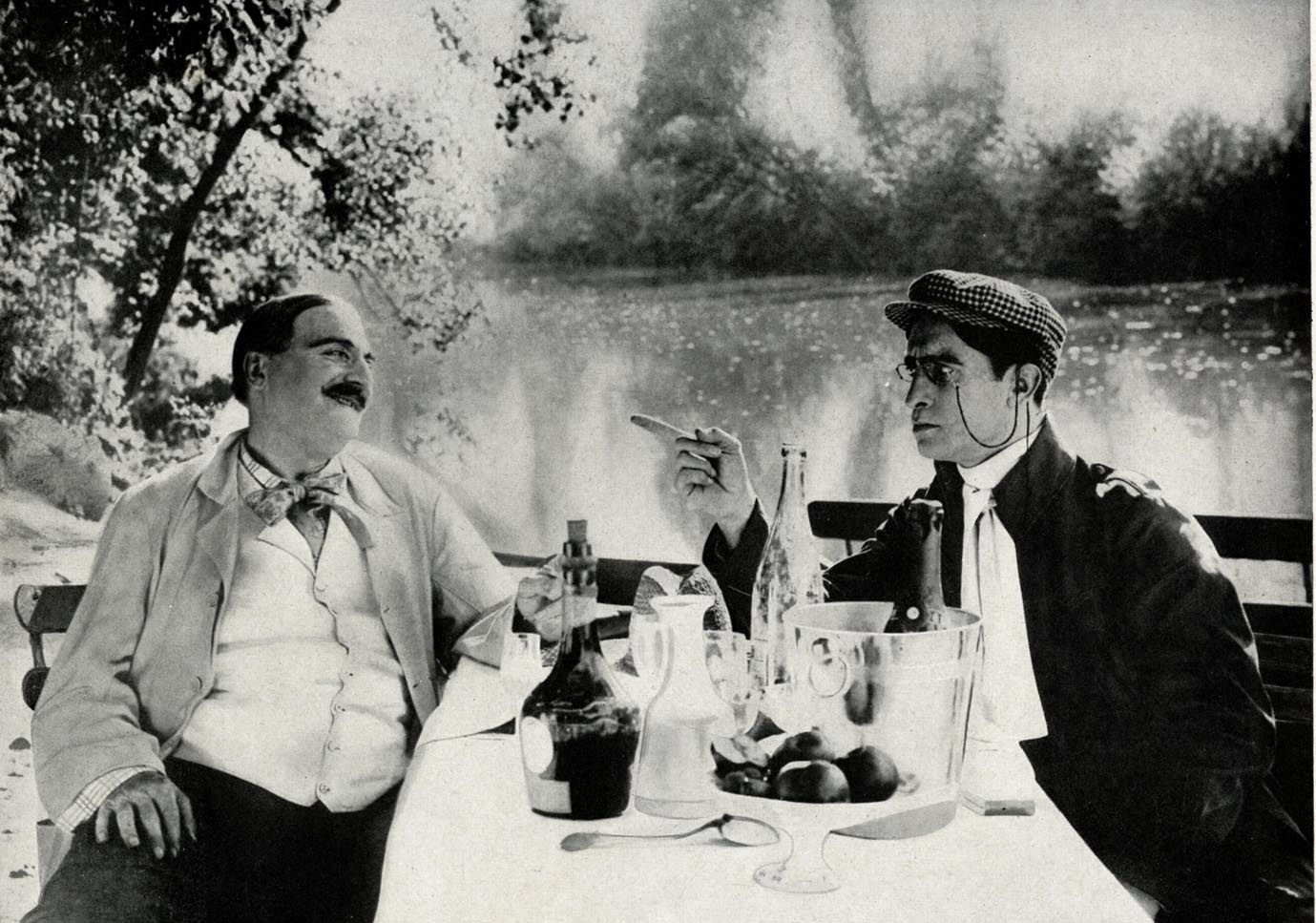
- Scene from film
- Directed by: Louis Feuillade
- Written by: Louis Feuillade
- Starring: Sandra Milovanoff; Georges Biscot
- Cinematography: Maurice Champreux; Léon Morizet
- Edited by: Maurice Champreux
- Release date: 10 December 1921
- Running time: 380 minutes
- Country: France
- Languages: Silent; French intertitles

Parisette (French pronunciation: [paʁizɛt]) is a 1921 French drama film serial directed by Louis Feuillade.

== Cast ==
- Sandra Milovanoff as Parisette
- Georges Biscot as Cogolin
- Fernand Herrmann as Le banquier Stephan
- Édouard Mathé as Pedro Alvarez
- René Clair as Jean Vernier
- Henri-Amédée Charpentier as Le père Lapusse
- Jeanne Rollette as Mélanie Parent (as Jane Rollette)
- Jane Grey as Mme. Stephan
- Pierre de Canolle as Joseph
- Bernard Derigal as Marquis de Costabella (as Derigal)
- Arnaud as Candido
- Gaston Michel

== See also ==
- List of film serials
- List of film serials by studio
- List of longest films by running time
