= Juliette Clarens =

French actress, singer, and writer (1887-1978)

Juliette Marie Charlotte Dietz-Monnin
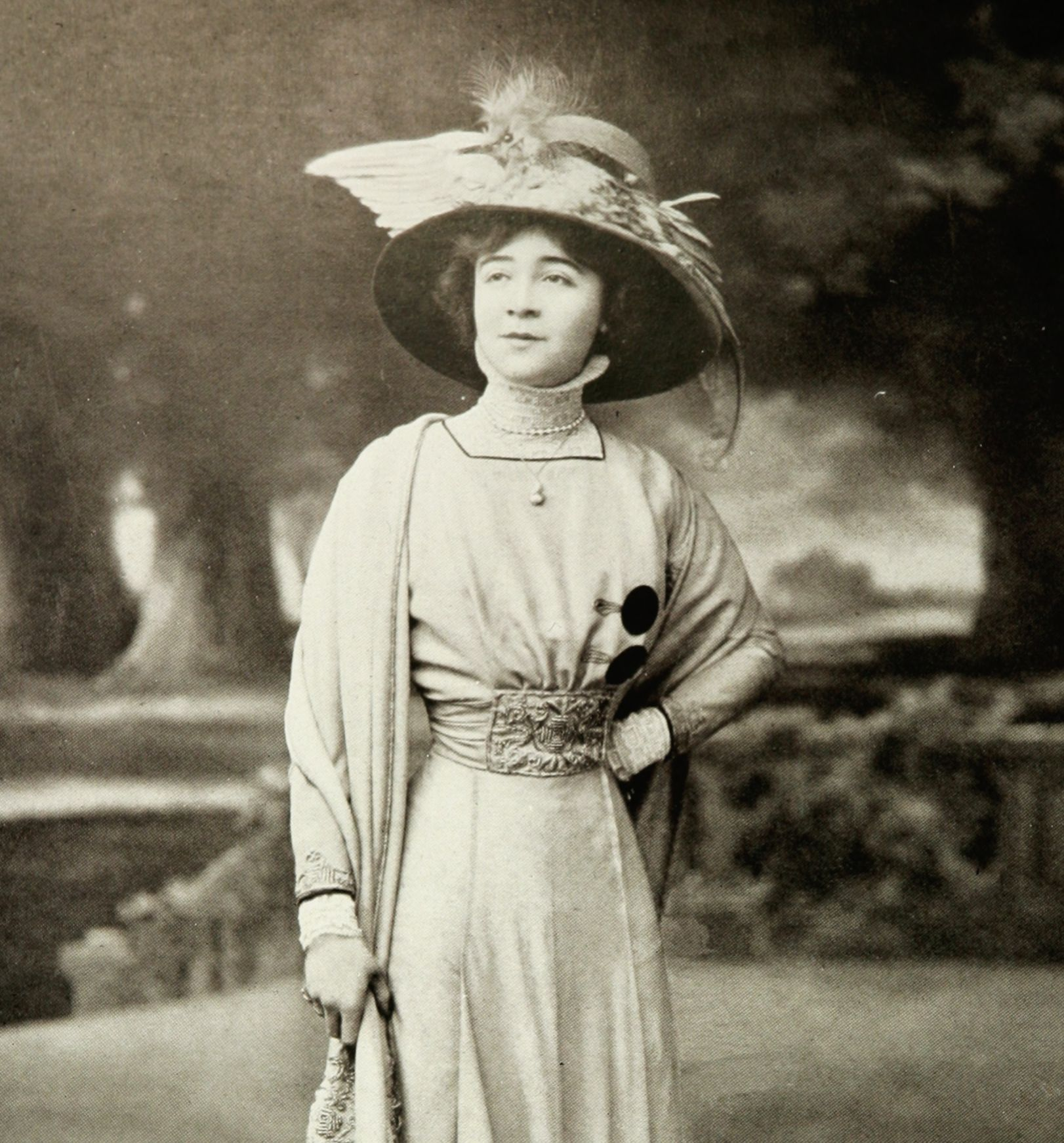
- Juliette Clarens, from a 1909 publication.
- Born: Juliette Marie Charlotte Dietz-Monnin; 10 April 1887; Paris, France
- Died: 10 October 1978 (aged 91); Paris, France
- Other names: Juliette Dietz-Monin
- Occupation(s): Actress, singer, writer
- Parents: Jules Dietz-Monnin (father); Henriette Adrienne Marie Adolphine Hallier (mother)

Juliette Clarens (10 April 1887 – 10 October 1978), born Juliette Marie Charlotte Dietz-Monnin, was a French actress, singer, and writer.

== Early life ==
Juliette Marie Charlotte Dietz-Monnin was born in Paris in 1887, the daughter of Jules Dietz-Monnin and Henriette Adrienne Marie Adolphine Hallier. Her father's family, of Alsatian origin, was socially and politically prominent; her grandfather was life senator Charles F. Dietz-Monnin, and her grandmother Adèle is featured in a painting by Edgar Degas. Because of their social standing, her choice of a stage career was considered newsworthy. She studied with Comédie-Française actress Thérèse Kolb.

== Career ==
Clarens was a stage actress and singer in Paris before 1920, a colleague to Cécile Sorel Geneviève Vix, and Yvonne Garrick. Like them, she was considered a stylish beauty, and she was often featured in fashion photographs in magazines and on postcards. She lectured on fashion trends.

Clarens appeared in dozens of short silent films made between 1910 and 1918; her longer works included appearances in Dette de haine (1915), Scènes de la vie de Bohème (1916), and the twelve-part serial Judex (1916), starring Musidora and René Cresté. Her final film was the seven-part serial Le travail (1920).

Later in life, Clarens was a writer, publicist, and journalist, author of D'avant-hier à aujourd'hui (1962).

== Personal life ==
In 1907, Clarens broke an engagement to marry French writer Francis de Croisset, reportedly to marry a Belgian banker named Lowenstein. She had a daughter, Yvonne Pierre-Mortier, with writer Pierre Mortier. Juliette Clarens died in Paris in 1978, aged 91 years.
