= Judex (1916 film) =

1916–1917 film serial by Louis Feuillade

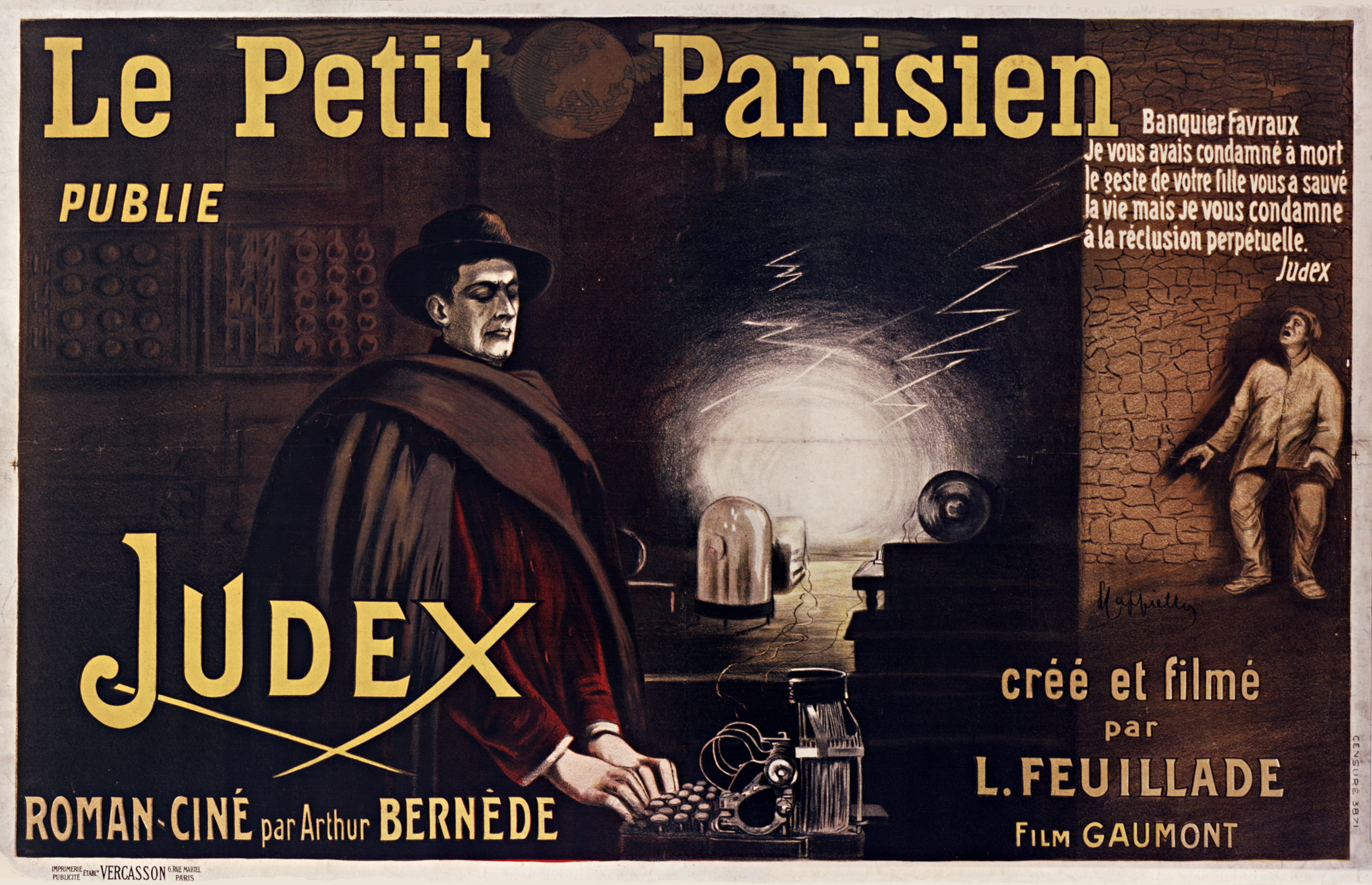
- Theatrical release poster
- Directed by: Louis Feuillade
- Written by: Arthur Bernède; Louis Feuillade
- Starring: René Cresté; Musidora; René Poyen; Édouard Mathé; Gaston Michel; Yvonne Dario
- Cinematography: André Glatti; Léon Klausse
- Distributed by: Gaumont
- Release date: Premiere: 16 December 1916; Serial release: 19 January 1917 to 7 April 1917
- Running time: c. 365 minutes (total)
- Country: France
- Language: Silent film serial with French intertitles

Judex is a 1916 French silent film serial consisting of twelve episodes, directed by Louis Feuillade in 1916, from a screenplay by Feuillade and Arthur Bernède, and released in 1917. Immediately preceding the weekly release of each episode, Judex's adventures were serialised in the daily magazine Le Petit Parisien.

The serial shows the exploits of Judex, a vigilante draped in a long black cape, who is sworn to revenge his family upon a corrupt banker. However, Judex falls in love with his enemy's daughter. Meanwhile, the adventuress Diana Monti and her criminal gang try to get Favraux's money. Judex was played by French matinée idol René Cresté, and Diana Monti was played by Musidora, who had caused a sensation in the role of the villainess Irma Vep in Feuillade's previous successful serial, Les Vampires. Judex was a commercial success upon its release, and Feuillade directed a sequel the following year, La Nouvelle Mission de Judex.

The story has been remade twice with the same title, in 1934, directed by Maurice Champreux, and in 1963, directed by Georges Franju.

The serial was the model for several episodic film series, and the Judex character was an influence on the creation of the later characters The Shadow and Batman.

== Plot ==
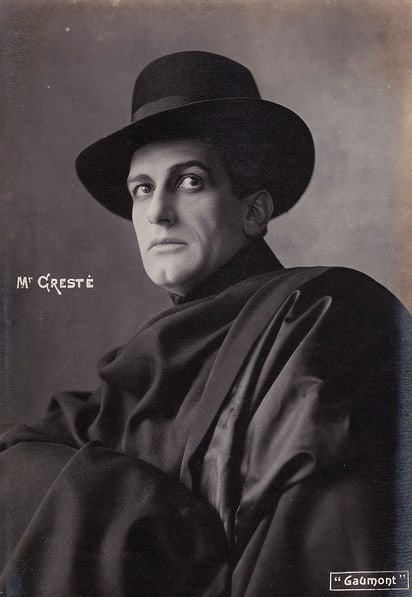
René Cresté as Judex

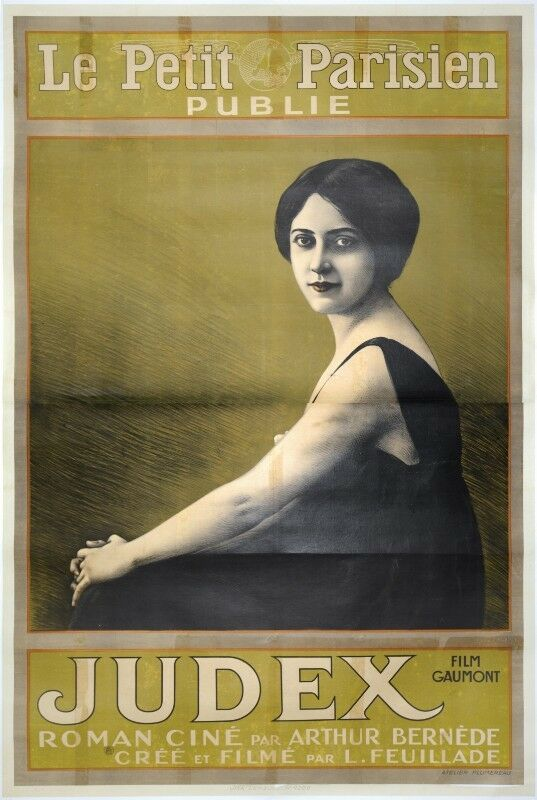
Publicity poster showing Musidora as Diana Monti

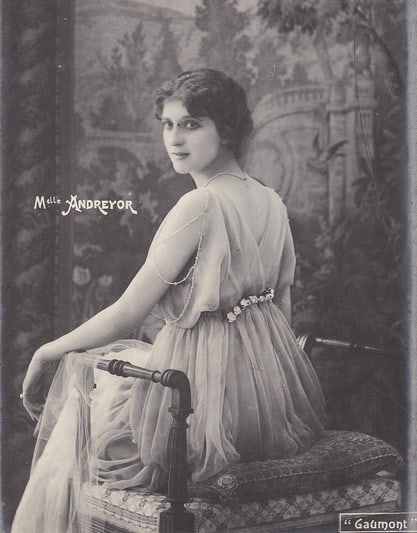
Yvette Andréyor as Jacqueline

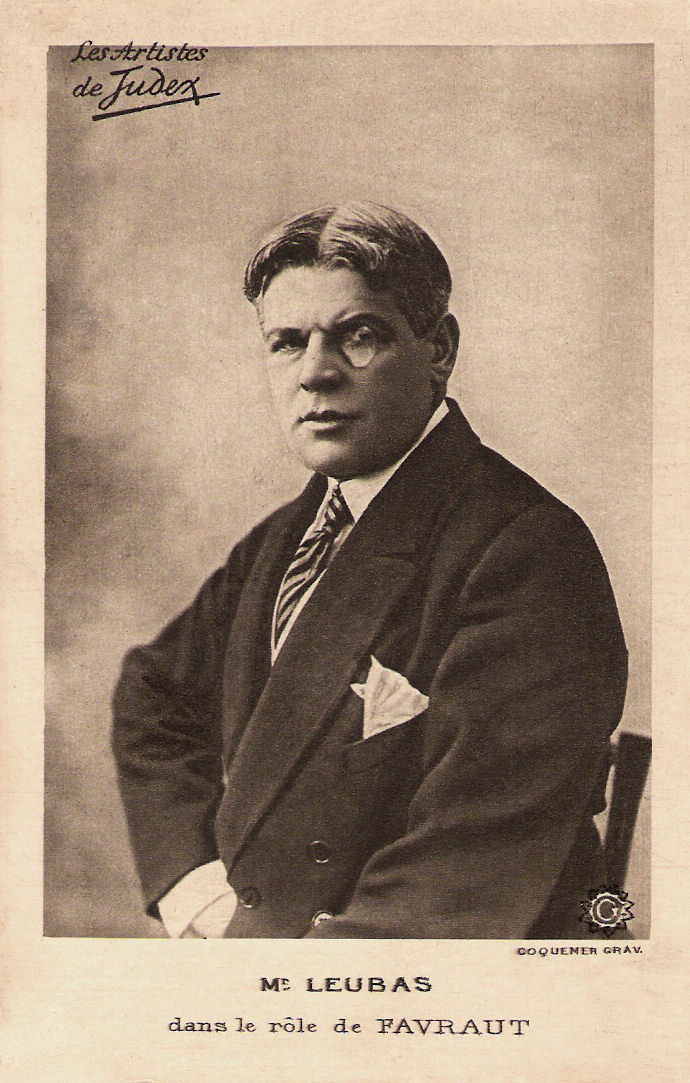
Louis Leubas as the banker Favraux

The story is complex and is told in a prologue and 12 chapters, varying in length from 9 to 40 minutes. In summary, a mysterious vigilante, Judex, (Latin for "Judge") takes on the banker Favraux, who built his fortune through criminal means. Judex kidnaps Favraux and imprisons him in the cellars of his hideout. Meanwhile, the adventuress Diana Monti intends to seize the banker's fortune. She kidnaps his daughter, but Judex, captivated by her charm, rescues and protects the young woman.

List of episodes
Episode	Title	Plot summary	Release date	Running time	Video
	Prologue	The unscrupulous investment banker Favraux grows his financial empire by ruining others. Diana Monti, an ambitious criminal mastermind and adventuress, has successfully infiltrated his household by posing as "Marie Verdier", the demure governess of Favraux's young grandson, Jean. She plans to seduce Favraux and take possession of his fortune, with the aid of her accomplice and lover Robert Moralès. Meanwhile, the debt-ridden Amaury de la Rochefontaine intends to enrich himself by marrying Favraux's daughter, the widowed single mother Jacqueline Aubry. An impoverished old man named Pierre Kerjean, just released from a long imprisonment, begs Favraux for help finding his lost son. It was the banker's bad advice and criminal involvement that led Kerjean to being jailed; his wife is dead and his son has turned to a life of crime under an assumed name. Favraux turns him away and later accidentally runs him over with his car. A mysterious figure named Judex sends Favraux letters demanding he repent for his crimes and give half his fortune to the Public Assistance Bureau to atone for his sins, or face fatal consequences that day. Alarmed, Favraux hires the comic detective Cocantin of the Céléritas agency to find out who Judex is. Favraux ignores the warnings and hosts a lavish party for Jacqueline's engagement. As the clock strikes ten, Favraux drinks a toast and immediately falls dead. Diana Monti is suspicious of the circumstances.	19 January 1917	40 min	
1	L'Ombre mystérieuse The Mysterious Shadow	Jacqueline discovers the extent of her father's dishonesty, confirmed by her father's secretary Vallières, and begins giving away his fortune to those he ruined, and the remains to the Public Assistance Bureau. She breaks her engagement with the fortune-seeking de la Rochefontaine, dismisses her household, and sends her son, Little Jean, to be raised by his former nursemaid in the countryside. Jacqueline receives a phone call and hears her father's voice begging her for forgiveness. In reality, Judex had used a specialised drug on Favraux to induce a death-like coma, smuggled his body out of the tomb, and imprisoned him in the deep, subterranean dungeons of his secret base, Château-Rouge, and forced him to speak on the phone. Determined to live an honest life, Jacqueline moves to Neuilly-sur-Seine in search of work as a piano teacher under the alias "Jeanne Bertin", where she encounters Vallières. Judex secretly observes her and begins to question the severity of his revenge. He sends her a secret message that he is watching over her and will come to her aid if needed. The brother of one of Jacqueline's new students tries to force himself on her. Diana Monti seethes with rage at the loss of Favraux's fortune. However, the rebuffed man, César de Birargues, brings his grievance to Diana Monti and Moralès, who hatch a plan to kidnap Jacqueline and allow de Birargues to heroically rescue her, in exchange for a payment from him of 10,000 francs.	19 January 1917	32 min	Episode 1: "The Mysterious Shadow"
2	L'Expiation; The Atonement	Judex and his brother, Roger, keep Favraux imprisoned in Château-Rouge. Little Jean goes to Paris alone to try to visit his mother, and befriends a street urchin, the Licorice Kid. Moralès and Diana Monti, disguised as the governess Marie Verdier, kidnap Jacqueline. Jean finds his mother's room empty, and frees her caged homing pigeons, which fly to Château-Rouge and alert Judex to her need. Diana realises Favraux may still be alive and starts manoeuvring to locate him before Judex can complete his plans.	27 January 1917	20 min	Episode 2: "The Atonement"
3	La Meute fantastique The Fantastic Dog Pack	Diana Monti and Robert Moralès hold Jacqueline in a villa, and demand additional payment from César de Birargues for the abduction. Judex deploys his pack of dogs to track Jacqueline to the villa, where he and Roger find the chloroformed woman. They allow her to sleep, leaving a note instructing her to follow the dogs into the woods, where she is rescued by de Birargues's father and sister, and returned to her home. Diana Monti and Moralès have escaped. A poodle walking on its hind legs brings them a note from Judex, warning them to leave Jacqueline alone. At Château-Rouge, where Favraux is imprisoned, Judex is thinking of the banker's daughter and may be falling in love with her. Roger goes to a clinic to visit his old protégé, Pierre Kerjean, who has recovered from the injuries caused by Favraux's car. They go to Château-Rouge, where Judex shows Kerjean that Favraux is not dead.	3 February 1917	44 min	Episode 3: "The Fantastic Dog Pack"
4	Le Secret de la tombe The Secret of the Tomb	Diana Monti and her gang exhume Favraux, and discover his coffin is empty. She and Moralès visit Detective Cocantin and demand to know where Favraux is. They offer him 100,000 francs to help them find Favraux alive, in which case the Public Assistance Bureau will have to return his millions. Diana decides they must dispose of Jacqueline, who could identify them. She threatens to reveal Moralès's real identity if he does not comply with her plan. They lure Jacqueline away and throw her into the river, but she is rescued by Little Jean and the Licorice Kid, and she is taken to the home of Jean's foster parents to recover. At Château-Rouge, Pierre Kerjean has become Favraux's jailer and Judex's servant. Kerjean asks permission to revisit his old mill, where he used to work, where his son was born and his wife died. Meanwhile, Judex decides to visit the seriously ill Jacqueline.	10 February 1917	31 min	Episode 4: "The Secret of the Tomb"
5	Le Moulin tragique The Tragic Mill	Vallières comes to ask about Jacqueline, but finds she has been abducted. Diana Monti and her gang take her to the old water mill. Moralès refuses to kill her; he and Diana fight, and she tries to stab him. Pierre Kerjean intervenes, and Moralès reveals he is Kerjean's own son. He blames Diana for his downfall, and promises to become an honest man. Pierre Kerjean leaves to phone Judex. Diana removes her outer clothing to reveal a bathing suit, and escapes by diving into the river. Judex returns Jacqueline to Vallières's home to recover. Vallières explains that Judex protects her because he loves her. She replies that the name Judex fills her with fear, and he is never to mention it to her. Later, it is revealed that Vallières is, in fact, Judex in disguise.	17 February 1917	32 min	Episode 5: "The Tragic Mill"
6	Le môme Réglisse; The Licorice Kid	Diana Monti visits Detective Cocantin and flirts with him. He allows her to stand in for him, and, as the governess Marie Verdier, she meets Amaury de la Rochefontaine. She enlists him as her accomplice in the search for Favraux. Judex's brother Roger goes to the countryside in order to reunite Little Jean with his mother. Jean is kidnapped by Diana Monti and de la Rochefontaine, and left with Detective Cocantin, who becomes fond of him, and is unsure. She reminds him he can earn 100,000 francs. The Licorice Kid tells Roger what has happened. Seeing a newspaper advertisement from the kidnappers, Roger sends the Licorice Kid to the Céléritas agency with instructions for them. Expecting Judex, Diana and de la Rochefontaine are both armed with pistols. The instructions are to display Jean on the balcony, but the Licorice Kid tells Jean to jump, and he is caught safely in a blanket by Roger and Judex. The honest Detective Cocantin disarms and chases Diana and de la Rochefontaine from his office, and befriends the Licorice Kid. Jean and Jacqueline are reunited.	24 February 1917	28 min	Episode 6: "The Licorice Kid"
7	La Femme en noir The Woman in Black	In a flashback to twenty years previously, the Comte de Trémeuse's financial ruin is shown, after the Comtesse de Trémeuse refused Favraux's advances. M. de Trémeuse shoots himself, leaving his wife and two young sons. Immediately afterwards, the sons inherit a valuable gold mine, restoring their fortunes. Their mother makes the boys swear to avenge their father's death. In the present day, it is revealed that Judex is in fact the Comte Jacques de Trémeuse. He begs his mother, who is dressed in mourning black, to release him from his vow, since he now loves Favraux's daughter, but she refuses. Disguised as Vallières, Judex visits Jacqueline and Little Jean. Cocantin takes the Licorice Kid to meet Jean, avoiding a kidnap attempt by Diana Monti and de la Rochefontaine. Mme. de Trémeuse tells her sons that she will avenge their father herself, but is deeply moved when she meets Favraux's grandson, Jean, and the Licorice Kid.	3 March 1917	36 min	Episode 7: "The Woman in Black"
8	Les Souterrains du Château-Rouge; The Underground Passages of the Château-Rouge	Mme. de Trémeuse and her sons go to Château-Rouge and visit Favraux. She sees he has lost his mind while imprisoned, and she relents. Robert Kerjean alias Moralès leaves a note to say he will enlist in the Foreign Legion, but he goes to see Diana Monti one last time. She reminds him that they could become wealthy and happy if he tells where Favraux is. He is captured by Diana's allure, and promises to bring Favraux to her and de la Rochefontaine. He abducts someone from the dungeons of Château-Rouge, but later finds it was his own father, who is delivered to Diana Monti. She plans to do away with him, believing him to be Favraux. At the end of a chase, Cocantin shoots de la Rochefontaine dead, and Pierre Kerjean is rescued.	10 March 1917	30 min	Episode 8: "The Underground Passages of the Château-Rouge"
9	Lorsque l'enfant parut When the Child Appeared	Roger and Mme. de Trémeuse take Jacqueline, Little Jean and the Licorice Kid to the family estate on the Riviera, where Judex keeps watch from a neighbouring villa, with Pierre Kerjean and Favraux. Judex introduces himself to Jacqueline as Jacques de Trémeuse; she thinks she has seen him before. Cocantin comes to stay, but is followed by Robert Moralès; he has returned to Diana Monti, who is disguised in a man's clothes. Jacques de Trémeuse and Jacqueline grow closer. Little Jean sees Favraux, who instructs him to tell Jacqueline that he has seen his grandfather. Jacqueline and Jacques find Kerjean tied up, and Favraux missing. Favraux escapes to a sailing ship hired by Moralès and Diana, who claims she is Marie Verdier, come to rescue her old employer and help him reclaim his fortune. The befuddled Favraux insists that his daughter and grandson must come with him, too. At the beach, Cocantin encounters his old flame Daisy Torp, a dancer from the Nouveau Cirque and keen swimmer.	17 March 1917	30 min	Episode 9: "When the Child Appeared"
10	Le coeur de Jacqueline; Jacqueline's Heart	Judex, posing as Vallières, visits and Jacqueline receives a note from her father asking her to come with Little Jean to the pier. However, Vallières insists on going in their place. Mme. de Trémeuse explains to Jacqueline that Vallières, Judex and Jacques de Trémeuse are the same person.	12 March 1917	9 min	Episode 10: "Jacqueline's Heart"
11	L'Ondine; The Water Sprite	Judex goes to the pier, expecting to have to pay a ransom for Favraux. Diana Monti takes him to her ship, observed by Cocantin and Daisy Torp. Judex tells Diana, Moralès and Favraux that he is both Judex and Jacques, the son of the Comte de Trémeuse, and is protecting his family. He is tied up, and they sail off. Daisy swims to the ship, climbs on board and frees Judex, adding that she is Cocantin's fiancée. Diana plans to dispose of Judex, but he turns the tables and the bound Moralès is thrown overboard by her gang, and she is overpowered. The ship returns to shore, and Diana and Daisy dive overboard, both vanishing. On shore, Jacques forgives Favraux and breaks the news to Pierre Kerjean that his son is dead.	31 March 1917	31 min	Episode 11: "The Water Sprite"
12	Le pardon d'amour Love's Forgiveness	Favraux is reunited with his daughter and grandson. Mme. de Trémeuse tells Judex that Jacqueline knows everything and loves him. Favraux begs Mme. de Trémeuse for forgiveness, which she grants on behalf of herself and her sons. Cocantin and the Licorice Kid are reunited, and meet the rescued Daisy Torp. The grieving Kerjean finds the drowned body of Diana Monti on the beach. In an epilogue, Perre Kerjean mourns his son; Favraux, still dead to the law, lives as a recluse; Cocantin marries his water sprite, and they adopt the Licorice Kid; and Jacques and Jacqueline are engaged.	7 April 1917	16 min	Episode 12: "Love's Forgiveness"

== Cast ==
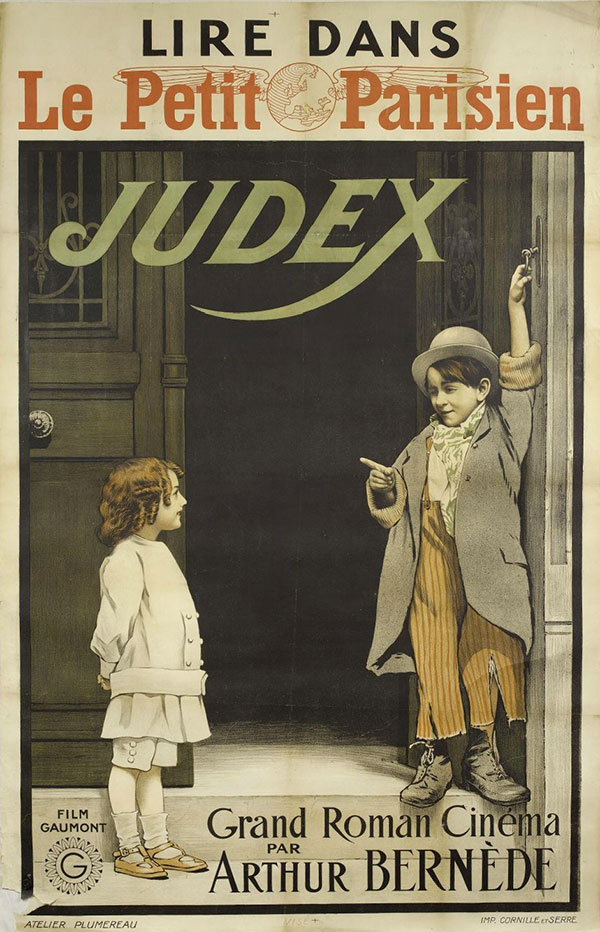
Publicity poster showing Little Jean and the Licorice Kid

- René Cresté – Jacques de Trémeuse alias Judex
- Musidora – Diana Monti alias Marie Verdier
- Yvette Andréyor – Jacqueline Aubry alias Jeanne Bertin
- Édouard Mathé – Roger de Trémeuse
- Gaston Michel – Pierre Kerjean
- Louis Leubas – Favraux, the banker
- Marcel Lévesque – Alfred Cocantin
- Jean Devalde – Robert Kerjean alias Moralès
- René Poyen – The Licorice Kid
- Yvonne Dario – the Comtesse de Trémeuse
- Juliette Clarens – Gisèle de Birargues, Jacqueline's pupil
- Uncredited actor – César de Birargues, Gisèle's brother
- Georges Flateau – Amaury de la Rochefontaine
- Olinda Mano – Little Jean
- Charles Montel – Jonas
- Lili Deligny – Daisy Torp
- Fabien Haziza – Judex as a child

== Production ==
=== Background ===
Louis Feuillade had made two earlier serials, Fantômas (1913) and Les Vampires (1915–1916), about cunning criminals. Though popular with audiences, the serials drew criticism for glorifying outlaws. Feuillade opted for a lighter approach for his next film series, celebrating the adventures of a vigilante. Judex, by contrast, was a heroic persona, but one who had all of the sinister trappings of the flamboyant villains who were popular at the time. Announcing the series, Feuillade assured the public, that Judex was "A film… which we have wished to be popular in the largest and the most wholesome sense of the word, a family spectacle inciting the most noble sentiments in which we have made every effort to please Children and Adults, thanks to a plot with the most diverse and unforeseen intricacies", and "a popular and wholesome family spectacle as well as a spectacle of emotions, joy and art that wished to offer a truthful story, full of adventure, love, laughter, and tears." However, the BFI observes that "Although keen to provide escapist entertainment and avoid re-offending the authorities, Feuillade nevertheless blurred the moral lines around Judex's vigilantism, while also relishing the seductive wickedness of Musidora's larcenous adventuress, Diana Monti."

In collaboration with the novelist Arthur Bernède, Feuillade developed a film project, accompanied by a 12-part cinematographic novel, which would be simultaneously serialised in newspapers and film, with story revisions by Feuillade. This would maximise the serial's profitability, particularly by taking advantage of the advertisements accompanying the serialised novel following the 1916 paper crisis, which considerably reduced the print run of advertising brochures.

=== Development ===
Arthur Bernède explained the close collaboration he had with Feuillade, who was in charge of the cinematographic aspects, in the creation of Judex. He said that they worked in perfect harmony, according to a pre-established plan, from which neither deviated for a single moment: "In this pooling of ideas and efforts, we sought to create a picturesque, entertaining work, dramatic enough to captivate everyone's attention, but above all respectful of public morality."

While working on Judex, Bernède developed a writing method that he retained for all his novel-film productions: he constructed a screenplay that served both as the basis for writing a novel and for the serial's storyboard. Then, after submitting a twelve-page screenplay to Feuillade, Bernède participated in the series's storyboarding and continued his collaboration during filming.

=== Character Influences ===
For their creation of Judex, Feuillade and Bernède drew upon a wealth of literary references. Thus, Judex shares many similarities with Fantômas such as his penchant for disguises and his forceful methods, except that Judex fights for justice. Moreover, as a further parallel, Feuillade suggested René Navarre, who played Fantômas in the eponymous 1913 serial, but he ultimately declined.

Furthermore, Judex also shares commonalities with the Count of Monte Cristo: the hero's relentless pursuit of Favraux stems from the banker's past ruin of his family; and after placing him in a state of artificial death, he secretly imprisons him in his base. As in Alexandre Dumas's work, the story clearly falls within the realm of family revenge.

Finally, Judex is reminiscent of the character Ténébras from Arnould Galopin's novel Ténébras, le bandit fantôme (Ténébras, the Phantom Bandit): Judex's revenge brings about the financial ruin of the banker Favraux's daughter, Jacqueline, but after falling in love with her, he decides to protect the young woman from any danger she might encounter. This romance strongly evokes the one Ténébras has with the woman with whom he falls in love.

=== Casting ===
Judex was played by French matinee idol René Cresté. After her success as Irma Vep in Les Vampires, Musidora was once again chosen for the role of the wicked governess and adventuress Diana Monti. Feuillade also brought back Marcel Lévesque, who had played Mazamette in Les Vampires, for the role of the detective Cocantin.

== Release ==
=== Delay ===
Due to the First World War, the serial's release in France was delayed, as Gaumont Studios feared sparking controversy and undermining the morale of the French population. Consequently, both the serial and the novel remained shelved for several months. Ultimately, a competing film series produced by Pathé prompted its release. Directed by the Franco-American duo Louis J. Gasnier and Donald MacKenzie, The Shielding Shadow, released in France as Ravengar and also featuring a vigilante, was released in the United States in 1916. It is likely that Gaumont, fearing that Gasnier and McKenzie's serial would be released in France before Feuillade's, decided to release Judex at the beginning of 1917.

=== Premiere ===
An avant-première was held on 16 December 1916 in the Gaumont-Palace, when the first four episodes were shown. It is unclear whether the premiere was an invitation-only gala screening, a press screening for critics and industry figures, or a first presentation before the serial entered regular distribution.

=== General release ===
The first text episode of Judex was published in the 12 January 1917 issue of Le Petit Parisien, a week before the film debut on 19 January. Each Judex text episode was published before the corresponding film serial episode, which built up anticipation. The text episodes ran from 12 January to 6 April, and the film episodes ran from 19 January to 7 April.

The international release of the serial was delayed until late 1917 in Europe. A North American release did not occur until the Canadian Film Institute's National Film Theatre arranged a screening in February 1965.

The serial was a commercial success upon its release, and Feuillade directed a sequel serial the following year, titled La Nouvelle Mission de Judex (lit. The New Mission of Judex, also known in English as The Further Exploits of Judex). The sequel serial ran in Le Petit Parisien from 11 January to 4 April 1918, and the film episodes ran from 25 January to 15 April 1918

== Home media ==
On 1 July 2004, a 315-minute DVD version of the most complete version of the serial then known was released in the US, distributed by Flicker Alley (2 DVDs, Region 1/NTSC), transferred from a 35 mm print, colour-tinted and colour-toned, with English-only intertitles, and musical accompaniment by Robert Israel. Extras include a 18-minute featurette about the new score by Robert Israel. The serial's commentary is by Jan-Christopher Horak, the international critic and scholar of silent film.

On 17 March, 2025, a 380-minute Blu-ray version was released, taken from Gaumont's 4K restoration of 2020, colour-tinted and colour-toned, with French-language intertitles, and optional English-language subtitles. Extras include audio commentaries by Tim Lucas, and an interview with writer, composer and silent film accompanist Neil Brand. It is published by Eureka Entertainment as part of the Masters of Cinema line.

== Influence ==
=== As a model for the episodic film ===
Louis Feuillade's serial inspired many directors of the 1910s and 1920s in their use of episodic film series. Not only did the twelve-episode format, unique to Judex, become the standard, but also its narrative structure served as a model: a series of episodes of similar length (approximately 600 metres), with the exception of the first (approximately 1,200 metres), which also includes a prologue introducing the characters.

Feuillade's Judex inaugurated a line of episodic films constructed on the same model: Mascamor (1918) by Pierre Marodon, Les Mystères de Paris (1922) by Charles Burguet, and others.

=== The Judex character ===
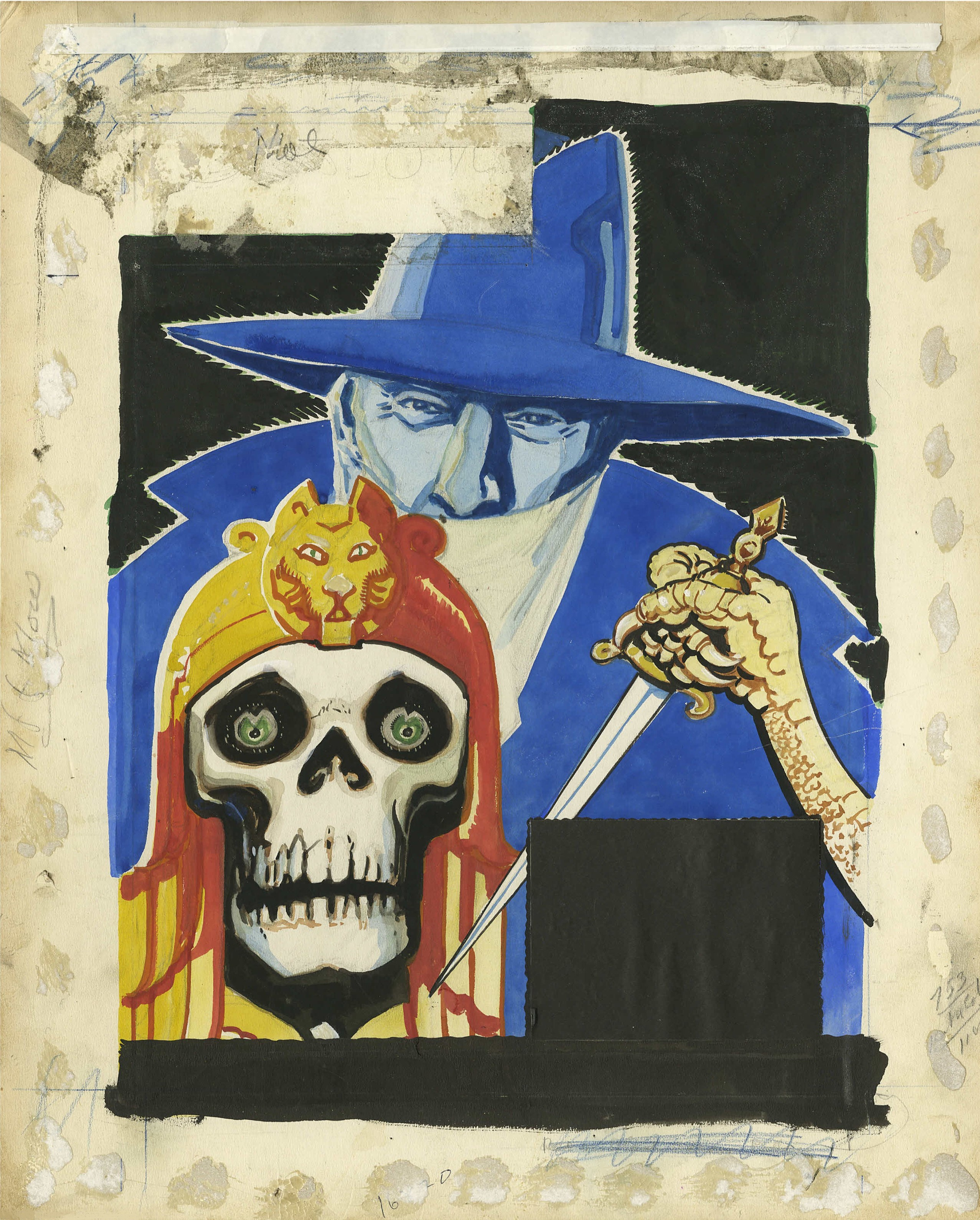
The Shadow, illustration by Charles Joseph Coll, May 1946

The vigilante characters of Judex and Ravengar very likely contributed to inspiring The Shadow, a pulp character first appearing in 1930, who wears a costume similar to Judex's and possesses Ravengar's power of invisibility. Furthermore, the first Judex story was titled The Mysterious Shadow in the United States, while the character of Ravengar appeared in the serial The Shielding Shadow. In the 1940s, comic strips of The Shadow, a character then unknown to French readers, were published in France in a translation that transformed them into Judex adventures.

An immediate precursor to superheroes, The Shadow is in turn one of Batman's inspirations. Thus, for the comic book expert Xavier Fournier, Judex is "in a way, the grandfather of the famous Dark Knight".

== Restoration ==
From 4 to 11 October 1991, as part of the Ciné-Mémoire festival, all twelve episodes were screened daily at La Pagode cinema in Paris, in a complete version fully restored for the occasion. Below the screen, a small orchestra played music composed and conducted by Patrick Laviosa.

The film series was restored by Gaumont in 2020 supported by the Centre national du cinéma et de l'image animée, by scanning Gaumont's nitrate negative in 4K, and completed using a tinted nitrate print at Lobster Films.

== Remakes ==
A remake, also named Judex, was made in 1934, directed by Feuillade's son-in-law, Maurice Champreux, and starring René Ferté as Judex. Another remake, again named Judex, was filmed in 1963 by director Georges Franju. American magician Channing Pollock played the title role.

== See also ==
- Judex
- La Nouvelle Mission de Judex (1918 film)
- Judex (1934 film)
- Judex (1963 film)
- List of film serials
- List of film serials by studio

== Sources ==
- Fournier, Xavier (2014). Super-héros: une histoire française [Superheroes: A French Story] (in French). Huginn & Muninn. ISBN 978-2-36480-127-1. Fournier2014.
- Lacassin, Francis (1995). Louis Feuillade: maître des lions et des vampires [Louis Feuillade: Master of lions and vampires] (in French). Paris: Pierre Bordas et fils. ISBN 2-86311-271-6.
- Neau, Jessy (May 2013). "Un épisode du cinéma français" [An Episode of French cinema]. Acta fabula (in French). 14 (4).
- Trebuil, Christophe (2012). Un cinéma aux milles visages : Le film à épisodes en France (1915-1932) [A cinema with a thousand faces: The episodic film in France (1915-1932)] (in French). Association française de recherche sur l'histoire du cinéma. ISBN 978-2913758711.
