= The Two Girls =

The Two Girls or Les deux gamines may refer to:

- The Two Girls (1921 film), a French silent drama film
- The Two Girls (1936 film), a French drama film and a sound film remake of the previous
- The Two Girls (1951 film), a French drama film and a remake of the two previous
