= Arthur Bernède =

French writer, poet, opera librettist, and playwright

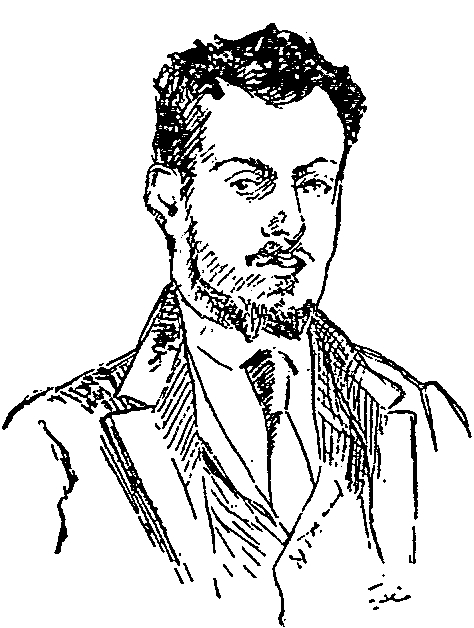
- Arthur Bernède; Portrait by Frédéric-Auguste Cazals
- Born: 5 January 1871; Redon
- Died: 20 March 1937 (aged 66); Paris
- Occupations: Writer, poet, opera libretist, playwright

Arthur Bernède (French pronunciation: [aʁtyʁ bɛʁnɛd]; 5 January 1871 – 20 March 1937) was a French writer, poet, opera librettist, and playwright.

Bernède was born in Redon, Ille-et-Vilaine department, in Brittany. In 1919, Bernède joined forces with actor René Navarre, who had played Fantômas in the Louis Feuillade serials, and writer Gaston Leroux, the creator of Rouletabille, to launch the Société des Cinéromans, a production company that would produce films and novels simultaneously. Bernède published almost 200 adventure, mystery, and historical novels. His best-known characters are Belphégor, Judex, Mandrin, Chantecoq, and Vidocq. Bernède also collaborated on plays, poems, and opera libretti with Paul de Choudens; including several operas by Félix Fourdrain.

Bernède also wrote the libretti for a number of operas, among them Jules Massenet's Sapho and Camille Erlanger's L'Aube rouge.

== Works ==
Opéras, opéras bouffe and vocal pieces

- Phryné, opera by Camille Saint-Saëns
- Marie Fouré, opera by André Fijan (1897), created in Péronne
- Sapho, opera by Jules Massenet (1897), libretto in collaboration with Henri Cain, with the singer Emma Calvé in the title role
- Ninon de Lenclos, opera by Edmonde Missa (1895), libretto in collaboration with André Lénéka (1856-1937), created at the Opéra-Comique
- Les Petites Vestales, opéra bouffe by Justin Clérice (1900)
- La Légende du Point d'Argentan, pièce lyrique, by Félix Fourdrain (1907)
- La Glaneuse, poème lyrique by Félix Fourdrain (1908), libretto in collaboration with Paul de Choudens
- L'Aube rouge, drame lyrique de Camille Erlanger (1911), libretto in collaboration with Paul de Choudens, created at the Théâtre des Arts de Rouen
- Vercingétorix, opera by Félix Fourdrain (1912), libretto in collaboration with Paul de Choudens
- Madame Roland, opera by Félix Fourdrain (1913), libretto in collaboration with Paul de Choudens
- Les Contes de Perrault, féerie lyrique by Félix Fourdrain (1914), libretto in collaboration with Paul de Choudens, with Yvonne Printemps in the title role.

Theatre plays and monologues

- Le Lycéen (1891), played at the Théâtre Classique
- Le Petit Alsacien
- Revanche!
- Le Bijou de Stéphana (1892), comédie en vaudeville given at the Théâtre de Cluny
- L'Amour à crédit
- La Duchesse de Berry (1900)
- Les Idées de Monsieur Coton (1901), played at the Théâtre de la Renaissance
- La Pipe (1901), performed at the Théâtre de la Renaissance
- La Lune de Miel (1902), in collaboration with Daniel Riche
- Les Tonsurés (1905), anticlerical play
- La Soutane (1905), anticlerical play
- Sous l'Épaulette (1906), play advocating democratization of the army and social justice
- Aux Bat'd'Af (1906), antimilitarist melodrama, written in collaboration with Aristide Bruant
- L'Illustration théâtrale (1906)
- La Loupiote (1909)
- Cœur de Française (1912)
- Un jeune officier pauvre, trilogy (1921)

Popular novels

- Mésange, novel (1892)
- La Favorite, novel (1902–1903)
- Le Chevalier aux genêts d'or, novel (1903)
- Les Chevaliers de la mort, novel (1903–1905)
- L'Amant de la Duchesse, historical novel (1906)
- Les Chouans, historical novel (1906)
- Les Amours d'un petit soldat, sentimental novel (1910)
- Cœur de Française, spy novel (1912)
- L'Espionne de Guillaume, spy novel (1914)
- Judex, detective novel (1917)
- L'Aiglonne, historical novel (1922)
- L'Enfant du Palais (1923)
- Belphégor, detective novel (1927)
- Le Miracle des cœurs ou Tes yeux bleus, novel (1927)
- Poker d'As, spy novel (1928)
- Marie-Claire amoureuse or Le Triomphateur, novel (1928)
- Le Capitaine Anthéor, sentimental novel (1930)
- Le Marchand d'hommes, historical novel (1932)
- Vampiria, detective novel (1932)
- L'Espionne d'Hitler, spy novel (1934)
- Le Maître du feu, historical novel (1935)
- En Marge des vivants, novel (1937)
- Le Crime d'un magistrat (1937)
- L'Affaire Bessarabo, detective novel (based on Héra Mirtel)
- L'Affaire Bougrat, detective novel (based on Pierre Bougrat)
- L'Affaire Brierre, le massacre des Innocents, detective novel
- L'Affaire Fualdès, detective novel (based on the Affaire Fualdès dealing with murder of Antoine B. Fualdès)
- L'Affaire Gouffé, detective novel
- L'Affaire Lafarge, le mystère du Glandier, detective novel
- L'Alsacienne, detective novel
- L'Amant de la Duchesse, novel
- Les Amants du passé, sentimental novel
- L'Amour à crédit, novel
- L'Amour vengeur, sentimental novel
- Les Amours d'une ouvrière, sentimental novel
- Anastay, un officier assassin, detective novel (based on Louis Anastay)
- Un ancêtre de Landru, Pel, l'horloger empoisonneur, detective novel (based on Albert Pel)
- L'Ange et le démon, detective novel
- L'Ange du trottoir, novel
- L'Assassin des cœurs, detective novel
- L'Assassinat du Courrier de Lyon, detective novel (based on the Courrier de Lyon case)
- L'Assassin du Marquis de Morès, detective novel (based on Marquis de Morès)
- L'Archevêque assassiné, detective novel
- Aventures de Max Forter, novel
- Les Bas-Fonds de Chicago, detective novel
- Les Bas-Fonds de Marseille, detective novel
- La Bataille pour l'amour, sentimental novel
- Les Beaux romans de l'Histoire, collection
- La Belle Courtisane, sentimental novel
- La Belle Marion, sentimental novel
- Bonnier, Garnier & Cie, detective novel
- Bourreau des femmes, detective novel
- Le Calvaire de Casse-Cœur, detective novel
- Le Calvaire du Lieutenant Ferbach, novel
- Captive, novel
- La Chanson des cœurs, spy novel
- Chantecoq, spy novel
- Le Chanteur de Montmartre, novel
- La Chasse aux monstres, novel
- Le Château du milliardaire, novel
- Cocorico, spy novel
- Cœur cassé, novel
- Un cœur déchiré, detective novel
- Les Compagnons du soleil, adventure novel
- Condamnée à mort, detective novel
- Connais-tu l'amour?, detective novel
- Un crime d'amour, novel
- Le Crime d'un aviateur, detective novel
- Le Curé aux abeilles, detective novel
- La Dame de Paris, novel
- Du dancing au trottoir, sentimental novel
- La Dernière Incarnation de Judex, detective novel
- Les Derniers Chouans, novel
- Les Deux Parigotes, novel in collaboration with Ph. Vayre
- La Devineresse, sentimental novel
- Le Divorce de Joséphine, historical novel
- Le Docteur Laget, le drame du poison, detective novel (based on Dr Pierre Laget)
- Le Don Juan des grands bars, detective novel
- Le Drame des chauffeurs, detective novel
- Le Drame de la rue de la Pépinière, detective novel
- L'Enfant du Curé, societal novel
- L'Enfant des Filles, societal novel
- L'Épouse qui tue, detective novel
- Esclave d'une courtisane, novel
- Les Étapes du bonheur, detective novel, in collaboration with Aristide Bruant
- Le Fantôme du Père Lachaise, detective novel
- Féerique aventure, novel
- La Femme Weber, l'ogresse de la Goutte d'Or, detective novel (based on Jeanne Weber)
- La Fiancée de Lothringer, sting novel
- La Fille du Diable, detective novel
- Fille-mère, society novel
- Le Fils de l'Aigle, historical novel
- Flétrie et vengée, sentimental novel
- Fleur d'ajonc, sentimental novel
- Fleur du pavé, novel
- Galerie criminelle, detective collection
- Le Grand Amour d'une favorite, sentimental novel
- Le Grand Amour d'un petit gars, novel
- Un grand seigneur assassin, l'affaire Choiseul-Praslin, detective novel
- Guyot l'étrangleur, detective novel
- L'Homme au masque de fer, adventure novel (based on the Man in the Iron Mask)
- Un Homme de proie, novel
- L'Homme aux sortilèges, novel
- L'Homme aux trois masques, society novel
- L'Homme qui sourit, novel
- L'Homme qui tue, novel
- Impéria, detective novel
- Les Incarnations de Judex, detective novel
- L'Incendiaire, detective novel
- Interdit de séjour, detective novel in collaboration with P. Gilles
- L'Introuvable Assassin, l'affaire Cadiou, detective novel (based on a 1913 crime in Landerneau)
- Jean Bart, dieu des mars, adventure novel (based on Jean Bart)
- Jean Chouan, tome I: La Bataille des cœurs, tome II, La Citoyenne Maryse Fleurus, (1926) adventure novel (based on Jean Chouan)
- Lacenaire ou le Napoléon des bandits, detective novel (based on Pierre François Lacenaire)
- Landru, detective novel (based on Henri Désiré Landru)
- La Loi du Talion, novel
- Louise et Gabrielle, sentimental novel
- La Loupiote, spy novel, in collaboration with Aristide Bruant
- Madame tête de Boche, spy novel, in collaboration with Aristide Bruant
- Mado la blonde, novel
- La Maison hantée, detective novel
- Mandrin, adventure novel (based on Louis Mandrin)
- La Marchande de bonheur, detective novel
- Marquise et Gigolette or Les Drames de l'amour or Les Drames de la vie, novel
- Martyres de l'amour... vengez-vous, detective novel
- Les Martyres de Paris, sentimental collection
- Mata-Hari, spy novel (based on Mata Hari)
- Les Mémoires d'une Masseuse, novel
- Méphisto, novel
- Mestorino, detective novel
- Miousic détective, detective novel
- La Môme Coco, sentimental novel
- La Môme Printemps, sentimental novel, in collaboration with Aristide Bruant
- Le Mystère du train bleu, detective novel
- Les Mystères de la Bastille, novel
- Les Mystères du bonnet rouge, detective novel
- Les Nouveaux Exploits de Chantecoq, eight detective novel
- Les Nouveaux Exploits de Judex, detective novel
- Les Nouveaux Gangsters de Paris, detective novel
- La Nouvelle Mission de Judex, detective novel
- L'Ogre amoureux, detective novel
- On les a!, spy novel
- Nos grands mufles, novel
- Le Père de la Loupiote, novel, in collaboration with Aristide Bruant
- Le Petit Clown, detective novel
- Poker d'As, novel
- La Pommerais, un médecin empoisonneur, detective novel (based on Desire-Edmond Couty de la Pommerais)
- Pour l'amour et la liberté, novel
- Pour la couronne de France, novel
- Pour les jeunes, novel
- Prado ou le tueur de filles, detective novel (based on Prado)
- Pranzini, l'assassin de la rue Montaigne, detective novel (based on Henri Pranzini)
- Princesses du trottoir, societal novel
- La Prisonnière du château de Nantes, novel
- Les Quatre Sergents de La Rochelle, historical novel
- La Redingote grise, novel
- Reine, femme et mère, novel
- Le Roman d'une chanteuse, novel
- Le Roman d'un jeune officier pauvre, sentimental novel
- Rose fleurie, novel
- Les Sacrifiées, novel
- Sauvée par l'amour, novel
- Le Secret du légionnaire, novel
- Les Secrets de Bolo révélés, detective novel (based on Bolo Pasha)
- Serrez vos rangs, novel in collaboration with Aristide Bruant
- Seule avec son cœur, novel
- Seznec a-t-il été assassiné, detective novel (based on the Seznec Affair)
- Le Sorcier de la Reine, novel
- La Soutane, novel
- Surcouf, roi des corsaires, aventure novel (based on Robert Surcouf)
- Le Tambour d'Arcole, novel (based on the Monument au Tambour d'Arcole)
- Le Temps des miracles, novel
- Ma Tendre musette, sentimental novel
- Tête de Boche, novel in collaboration with Aristide Bruant
- Les Tonsurés, novel
- Les Travailleuses, societal novel
- Les Trois Ombres, novel
- Les Trois légionnaires, novel in collaboration with Aristide Bruant
- Le Tueur de femmes, detective novel
- Pour l'amour d'une belle, sentimental novel
- Suis-je un assassin?, novel
- Va... petit mousse, novel
- Le Vampire de Düsseldorf, detective novel (based on Peter Kürten)
- Vidocq, adventure novel (based on Eugène François Vidocq)
- La Vierge du Moulin Rouge, novel
- La Ville aux illusions, novel
- Zapata, adventure novel

Adaptations of literary works for cinema

- 1906: Fleur de Paris distributed by Louis Aubert, with Mistinguett
- 1906: Fille-Mère distributed by Louis Aubert
- 1916–1917: Judex by Louis Feuillade, with René Cresté and Marcel Lévesque
- 1918: La Nouvelle Mission de Judex by Louis Feuillade, with René Cresté and Marcel Lévesque
- 1921: L'Aiglonne, by Émile Keppens and René Navarre
- 1923: Vidocq, by Jean Kemm
- 1923: Mandrin, by Henri Fescourt
- 1923: Ferragus, adaptation of the novel Ferragus by Honoré de Balzac
- 1925: Surcouf
- 1925: Les Misérables, by Henri Fescourt
- 1925: Jean Chouan, by Luitz-Morat
- 1927: Poker d'As, by Henri Desfontaines
- 1927: Belphégor, by Henri Desfontaines
- 1927: Les Cinq Sous de Lavarède, by Maurice Champreux
- 1928: L'Argent, by Marcel L'Herbier
- 1931: Méphisto, with Jean Gabin in his first speaking role
- 1947: Mandrin directed by René Jayet
- 1962: Mandrin by Jean-Paul Le Chanois
- 1963: Judex by Georges Franju) with Channing Pollock, Francine Bergé and Édith Scob
