= Tih Minh =

1918 film

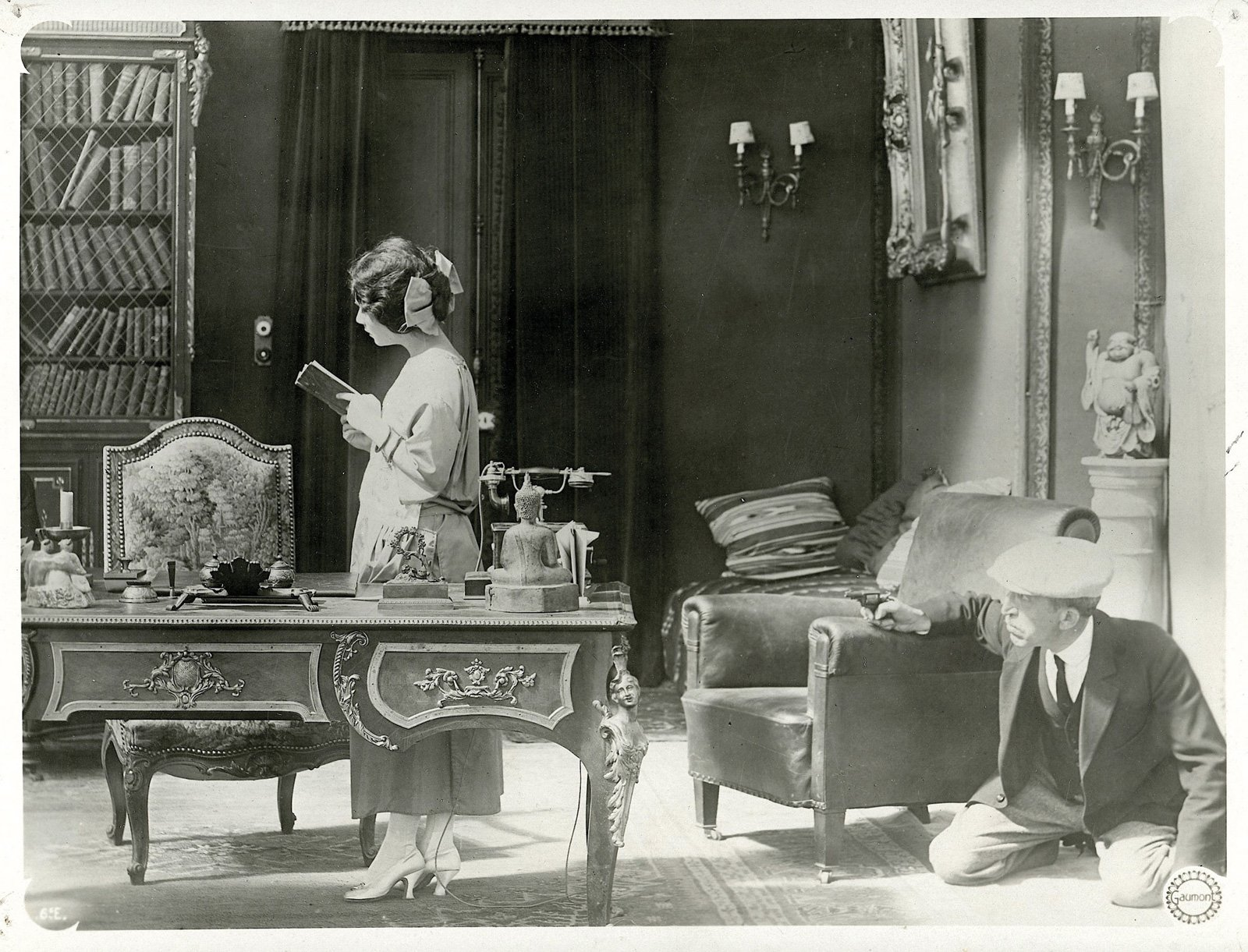
- Directed by: Louis Feuillade
- Written by: Louis Feuillade
- Starring: Mary Harald; René Cresté; Georges Biscot; Édouard Mathé
- Cinematography: Léon Klausse
- Edited by: Léon Klausse
- Production company: Société des Etablissements L. Gaumont
- Distributed by: Gaumont
- Release date: 30 November 1918
- Running time: 12 chapters (418 minutes)
- Country: France
- Languages: Silent; French intertitles

Tih Minh is a 1918 French film serial directed by Louis Feuillade.

== Plot ==
Tih Minh tells the story of Jacques d'Athys who returns to his home in Nice after an expedition to Indochina. Tih Minh, a young woman from Laos, accompanies him.

Athys and his servant, Placide, soon become involved with an international band of jewel thieves-cum-spies that include among its members a mysterious noble person, a hypnotist and an evil doctor who renders their victims amnesiacs.

Unknown to Athys, he has returned to France with a book that contains a coded message revealing the location of some treasures and of sensitive government intelligence as well. This makes him and Tih Minh the target of the spies who will stop at nothing to obtain the book.

Part 1

Part 2

Part 3

Part 4

Part 5

Part 6

Part 7

Part 8

Part 9

Part 10

Part 11

Part 12

== Cast ==
- Mary Harald (fr) as Tih Minh
- René Cresté as Jacques d'Athys
- Georges Biscot as Placido
- Édouard Mathé as Sir Francis Grey
- Louis Leubas (fr) as Kistna
- Gaston Michel as Dr. Gilson
- Marcel Marquet as Dr. Clauzel (as Marquet)
- Émile André as Dr. Davesnes
- Georgette Faraboni (fr) as La marquise Dolorès
- Jeanne Rollette as Rosette
- Lugane as Jane d'Athys
- Madame Lacroix as Mme d'Athys

== Reception ==
Tih Minh was edited and released in 1920 in the United States under the title In the Clutches of the Hindu. However, when compared to American film serials, its European-style pace of action was considered to be slow, and it would be the last European serial to be distributed in the American film serial format.

== See also ==
- List of film serials
- List of film serials by studio
