= Yvette Andréyor =

French actress (1891–1962)

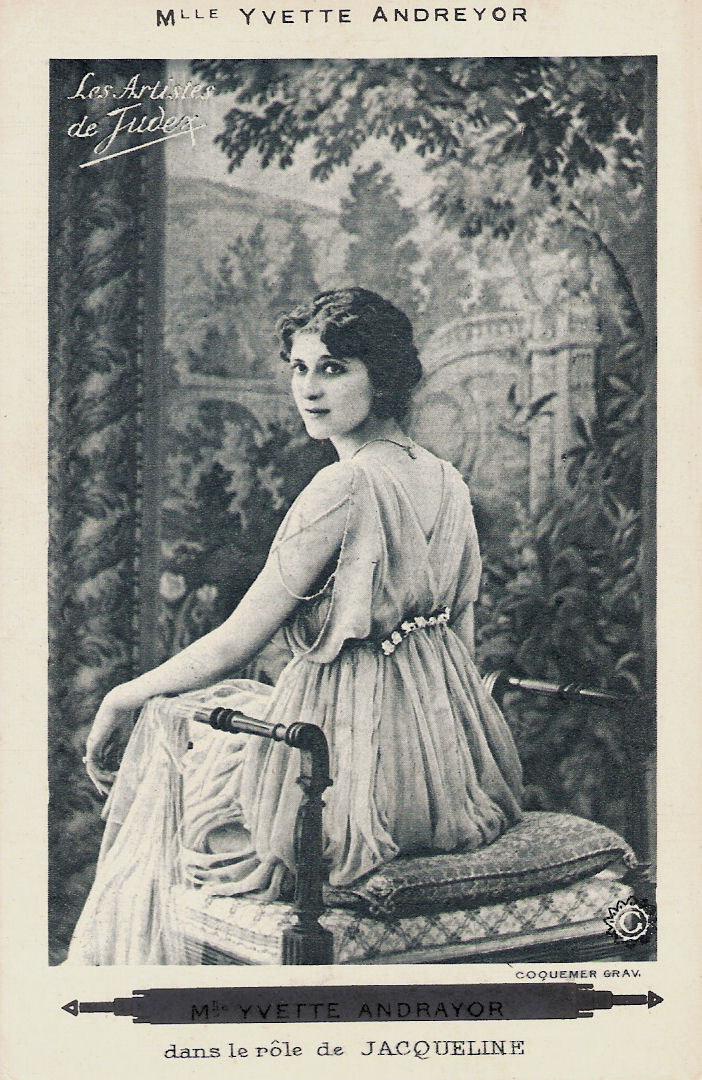
- Born: Yvette Louise Pauline Royé; 6 August 1891; Paris, French Third Republic
- Died: 30 October 1962 (aged 71); Paris, France
- Resting place: Saint-Ouen Cemetery
- Occupation: Actress
- Years active: 1897–1962
- Spouse: Jean Toulout (m. 1917; div. 1926)

Yvette Andréyor (born Yvette Louise Pauline Royé, 6 August 1891 – 30 October 1962) was a French actress most popular in the era of silent film. She appeared in more than 100 films between 1910 and 1962.

== Biography ==
Yvette Louise Pauline Royé was born at the maternity hospital of Port-Royal in the 14th arrondissement of Paris on 6 August 1891 to Jean-Baptiste André Royé, an artist, and Marie-Louise Carcel.

At six, she made her debut on the stage of the Théâtre de l'Odéon. She continued her artistic training at the conservatory where she won an award in 1913. Afterwards, she began performing at the Antoine theater and in Belgium.

Yvette Royé changed her name to Yvette Andréyor and made her film debut in 1910. She starred in Le haleur (1911) alongside Léonce Perret, who also directed and wrote it, and in Le Bossu (1912). In December 1914, Andréyor performed on Broadway in the play The Union Eternal.

Louis Feuillade took notice of her and directed her in numerous short films alongside Renée Carl, René Navarre, André Luguet, and Suzanne Grandais. Over the next ten years, Andréyor became one of Feuillade's favorite actresses.

At the end of 1912, she was Joséphine la pierreuse in Fantômas, a film serial in twelve episodes with René Navarre as the title role. In 1916, she was Jacqueline Aubry in Judex, the young widow with whom the popular hero embodied by René Cresté falls in love, and also in its 1918 sequel La Nouvelle Mission de Judex.

Andréyor then worked for other filmmakers, such as Gaston Ravel, Jacques de Baroncelli, Robert Péguy, and Germaine Dulac. In 1921, Andréyor acted as Sava Toronthal in Mathias Sandorf, an adaptation of the adventure novel by Jules Verne directed by Henri Fescourt.

In 1923, she returned to the Odéon, the theater where she made her debut, and devoted herself exclusively to the stage for the next 5 years. In 1928, Andréyor returned to the screen, appearing in Two Timid Souls, directed by René Clair.

In the 1930s, Andréyor only appeared in short films and was given supporting roles under the direction of Alberto Cavalcanti and Robert Péguy. After World War II, she acted alongside Georges Marchal in Torrents (1946) and Bourvil in Not So Stupid (1946).

Andréyor made her final film appearance in 1962 in La Planque.

Andréyor died in the 16th arrondissement of Paris on 30 October 1962. She is buried in the 33rd division of Saint-Ouen Cemetery.

== Selected filmography ==
- Fantômas (1913)
- Judex (1916)
- La Nouvelle Mission de Judex (1918)
- Mathias Sandorf (1921)
- Heart of an Actress (1924)
- Two Timid Souls (1928)
- My Little Marquise (1937)
- The Fatted Calf (1939)
- A Friend Will Come Tonight (1946)
- Not So Stupid (1946)
- The Widow and the Innocent (1949)
