= Bout de Zan et l'embusqué =

1915 film

- René Poyen as Bout de Zan
- Directed by: Louis Feuillade
- Starring: René Poyen
- Production company: Gaumont
- Release date: September 1915
- Running time: 8 minutes
- Country: France
- Languages: Silent film with French intertitles

Bout de Zan et l'embusqué (Bout de Zan and the Shirker) is a 1915 short silent film by Louis Feuillade. Louis Feuillade directed between 1912 and 1916 about sixty short films with Bout de Zan, a little boy played by René Poyen, as a recurring hero.

== Plot ==
France during World War I: Bout de Zan is irritated by his uncle's friend Marius always bragging about his shooting skills. When Marius bets that he will shoot a small bird in a tree, Bout de Zan finds out that he has paid a boy to drop a dead bird from the tree against which he will shoot a blank. Bout de Zan has the dead bird replaced by a stuffed one accompanied by a note saying that rather than lying he should go and fight the Germans. Ashamed, Marius rushes to enlist.

== Production ==
The film was produced by Sté. des Etablissements L. Gaumont, the company created in 1895 by Léon Gaumont.
