= La Nouvelle Mission de Judex =

1917–1918 film serial by Louis Feuillade

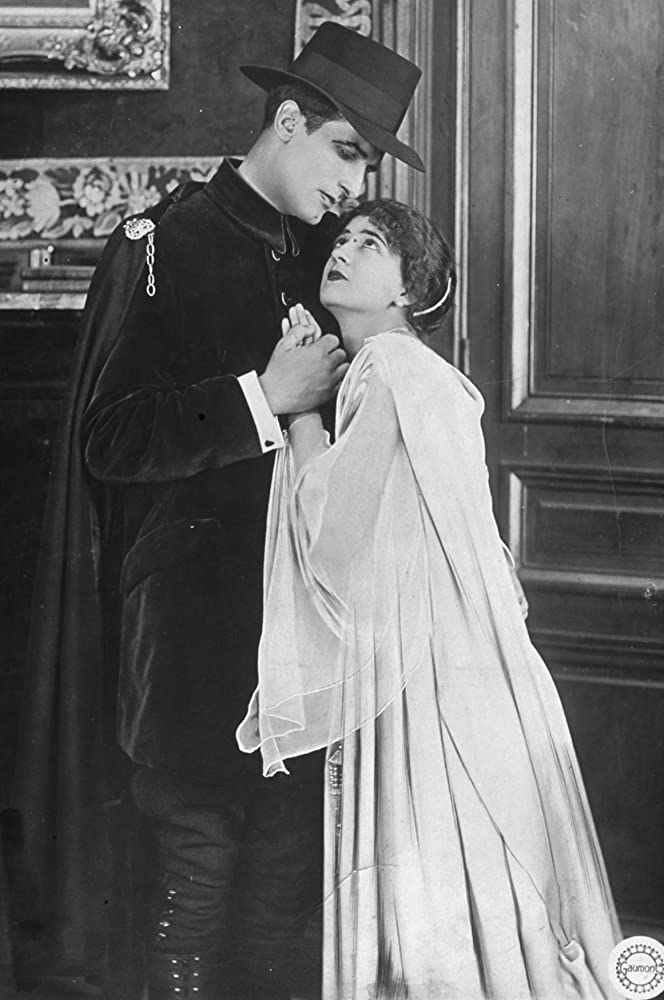
- René Cresté as Judex and Yvette Andréyor as Jacqueline
- Directed by: Louis Feuillade
- Written by: Arthur Bernède; Louis Feuillade
- Starring: René Cresté; Marcel Lévesque; Yvette Andréyor; Édouard Mathé; Gaston Michel
- Cinematography: André Glatti; Léon Klausse
- Distributed by: Gaumont
- Release date: 25 January 1918
- Running time: 374 min
- Country: France
- Language: Silent film serial with French intertitles

La Nouvelle Mission de Judex (lit. "The New Mission of Judex", also known in English as The Further Exploits of Judex) is a French silent film serial released in 1918, consisting of twelve episodes, directed by Louis Feuillade from a screenplay by Feuillade and Arthur Bernède. Immediately preceding the weekly release of each episode, Judex's adventures were serialised in the daily magazine Le Petit Parisien. It was a sequel to the 1916 serial Judex with most of the same cast, but was less successful. It is not generally available for viewing today.

== Plot ==
Jacques de Trémeuse, better known as Judex, has married Jacqueline, and has become a father to her son, Little Jean. Jacques' brother Roger loves Primerose, whose father is the inventor, Milton. Jean's teacher conceals a double identity: he is both the distinguished Dr. Howey, and also the criminal One-Eyed Man, who wears an eye patch. Dr. Howey and his accomplice, the dangerous Baronne d'Apremont, head an organisation known as the Rafle aux secrets ("The Raiders of the Secrets"). They both have the capacity to hypnotise the innocent Jacqueline and Primerose and make them do things against their will: Primerose steals the plans for her father's invention for them, an automatic propulsion system, just before Milton is to file the patent with the Minister of the Navy; Jacqueline threatens to poison her already ill son. Primerose kidnaps Jean on behalf of the crooks.

Judex is forced to take action. The Baronne and her female aid Gaby hold Little Jean, but they are captured and imprisoned by Judex and his colleague Cocantin. Gaby repents but the unrepentant Baronne escapes. Dr. Howey and the Baronne die when their boat explodes, accidentally caused by Cocantin. In the end, Primerose is cured and marries Roger.

== Cast ==
The sequel uses many of the same actors and characters as in the previous Judex film serial, with the notable exception of Musidora whose character, the villainous femme fatale Diana Monti, was killed off at the end of the earlier series.

- René Cresté as Judex
- Marcel Lévesque as Alfred Cocantin
- Yvette Andréyor as Jacqueline
- Édouard Mathé as Roger de Trémeuse
- Louis Leubas as Favraux, the banker
- Gaston Michel as Kerjean
- Émile Keppens as Milton
- Andrew Brunelle as Dr. Howey alias "The One-Eyed Man"
- Juana Borguèse (Note: Film historian Paul van Yperen claims that Juana Borguèse may have been an early pseudonym for the opera singer and actress Claudia Victrix, who later became the mistress and then wife of the film producer Jean Sapène.) as Baronne d'Apremont
- Georgette De Nerys as Primerose
- Cyprian Gilles as Gaby
- Olinda Mano as Little Jean

== Production ==
The director Louis Feuillade and the novelist Arthur Bernède had collaborated on the 1916 film serial Judex, accompanied by a 12-part cinematographic novel, which was simultaneously serialised in newspapers and film. After the success of that approach, they created a sequel serial titled La Nouvelle Mission de Judex (lit. "The New Mission of Judex", released in the UK as The Further Exploits of Judex).

The serial was shot almost entirely on the Riviera, in seven months.

The printed story ran in Le Petit Parisien from 11 January to 4 April 1918, and the film episodes ran from 25 January to 15 April 1918.

== Episodes ==
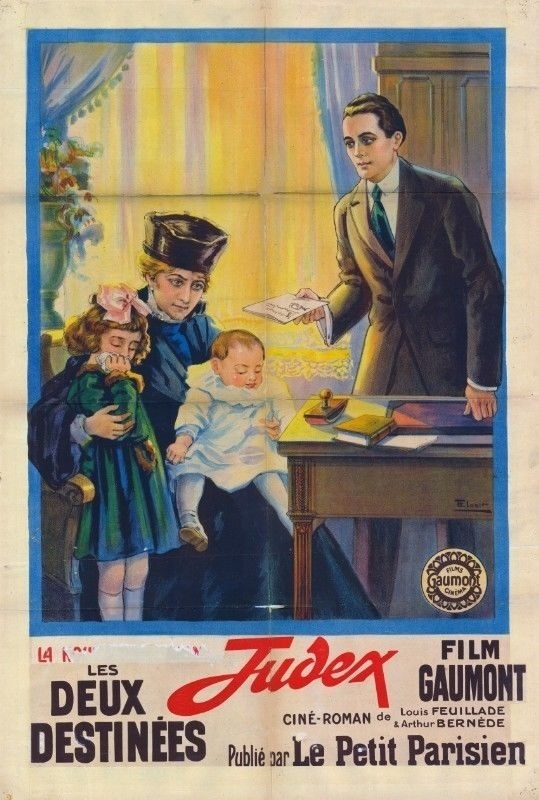
Theatrical release poster for episode 10: "The Two Destinies"

The twelve numbered episodes average 25 minutes in length each:

1. Le Mystère d'une nuit d'été (A Midsummer Night's Mystery)
2. L'Adieu au bonheur (Farewell To Happiness)
3. L'Ensorcelée (The Bewitched)
4. La Chambre aux embûches (The Chamber of Traps)
5. La Forêt hantée (The Haunted Forest)
6. Une Lueur dans les ténèbres (A Glimmer In The Darkness)
7. La Main morte (The Dead Hand)
8. Les Captives (The Captives)
9. Les Papiers du Dr. Howey (Dr. Howey's Papers)
10. Les Deux destinées (The Two Destinies)
11. Le Crime involontaire (The Unintended Crime)
12. Châtiment (Retribution)

== Reception ==
It is generally agreed that the serial was a poor sequel to the earlier Judex. The public was disappointed by the blandness of the revival and the serial was lambasted by critics, with the influential film critic Louis Delluc stigmatising Feuillade's "serialised abominations", and writing "Friends took me to see La Nouvelle Mission de Judex. Friends?"

== Preservation status ==
The Bibliothèque nationale de France (BnF) holds the most complete copy of the serial, with scenario and archival film material.

The BFI describes the serial as "infuriatingly unavailable (even online)". The serial is also unavailable on DVD.

== Gallery ==
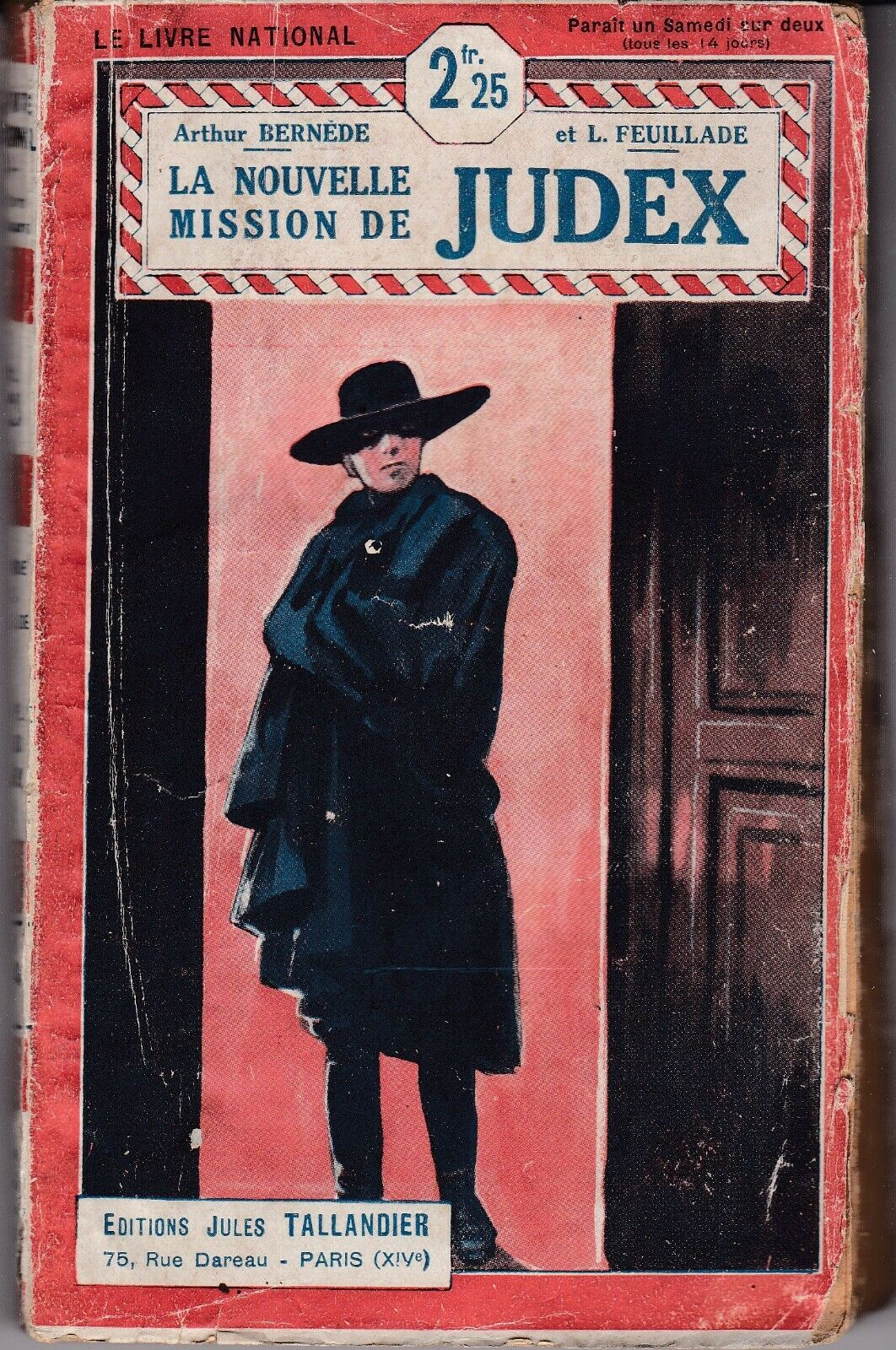
Front cover of a text episode

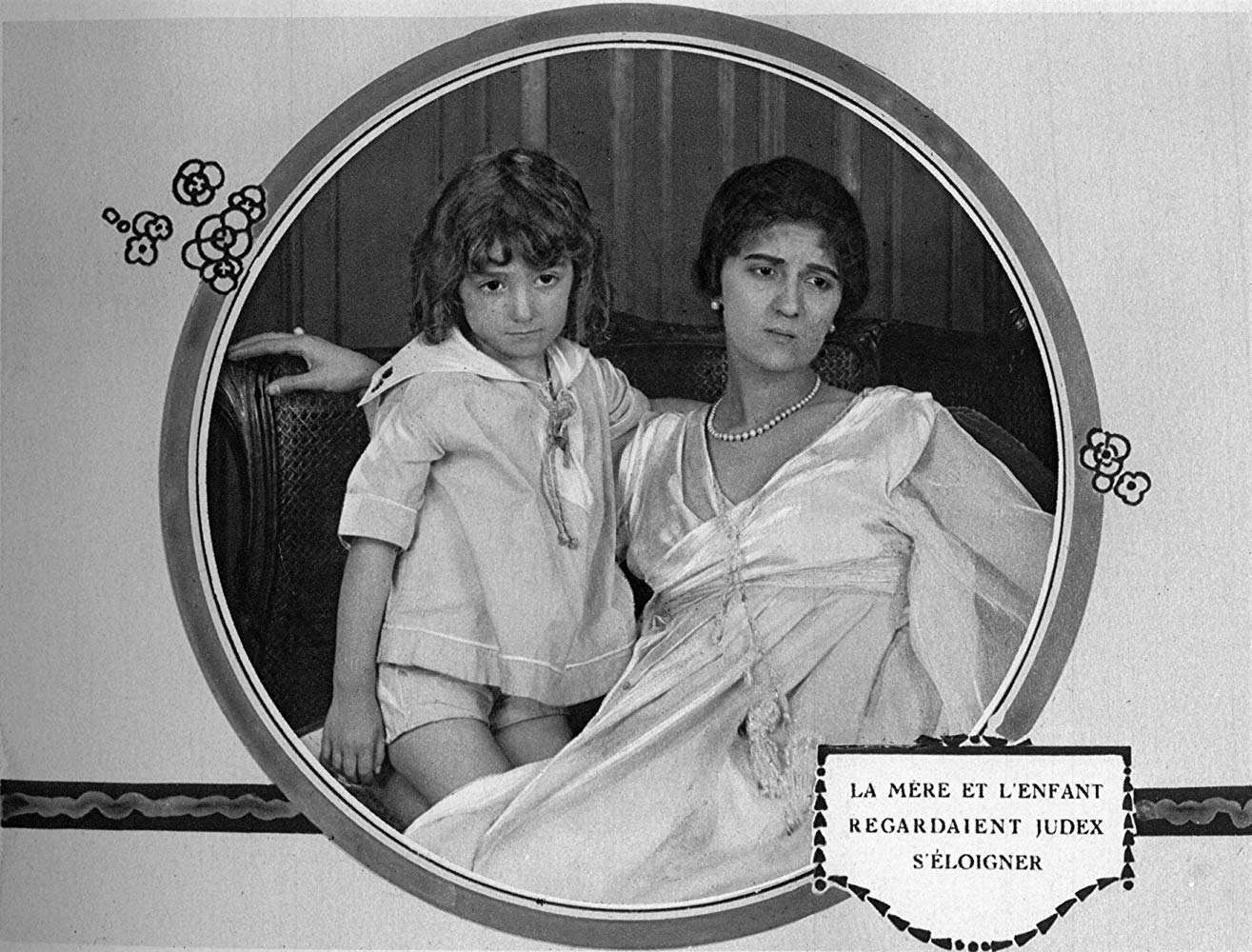
Yvette Andréyor as Jacqueline and Olinda Mano as Little Jean

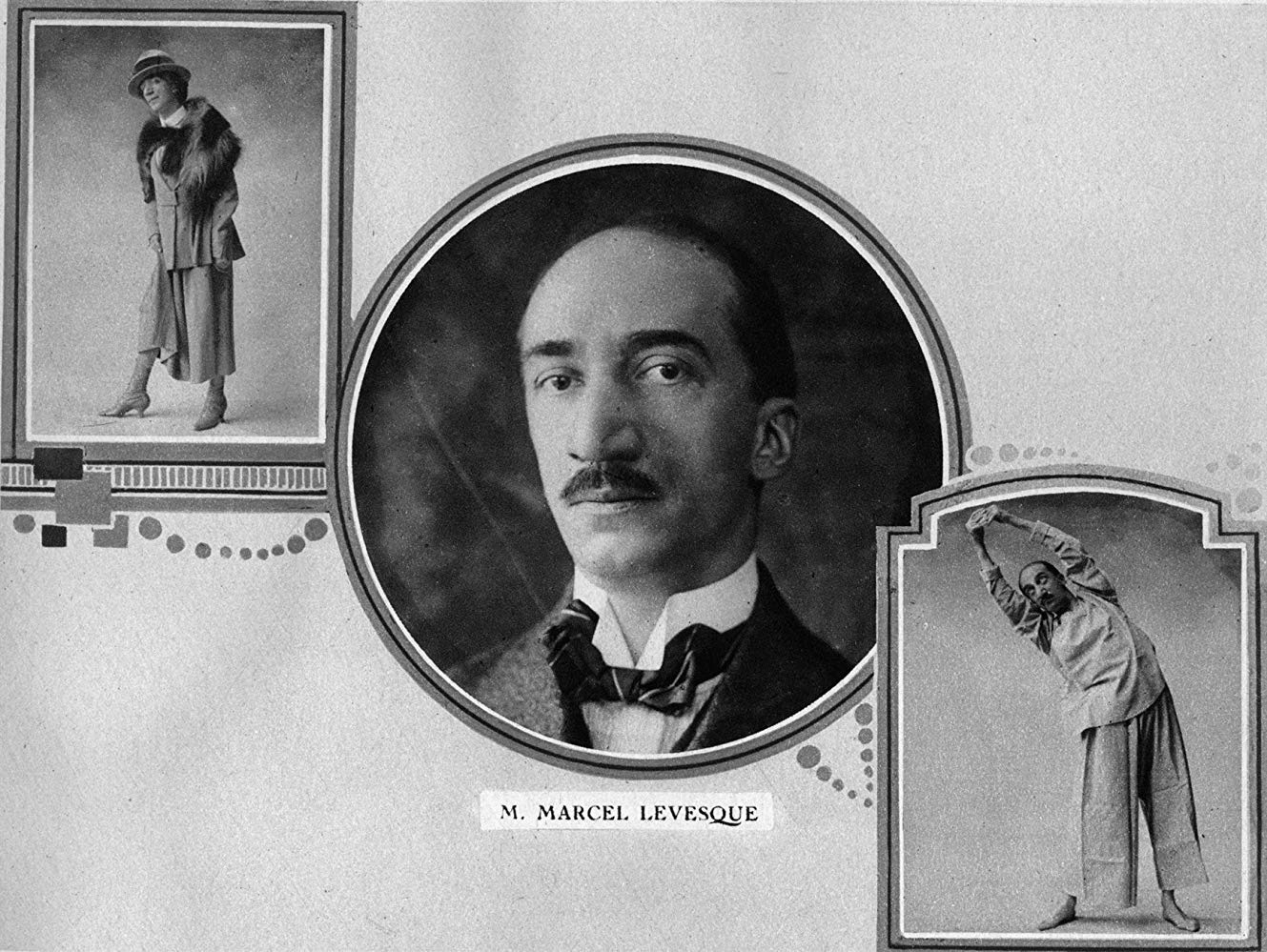
Marcel Lévesque as Cocantin

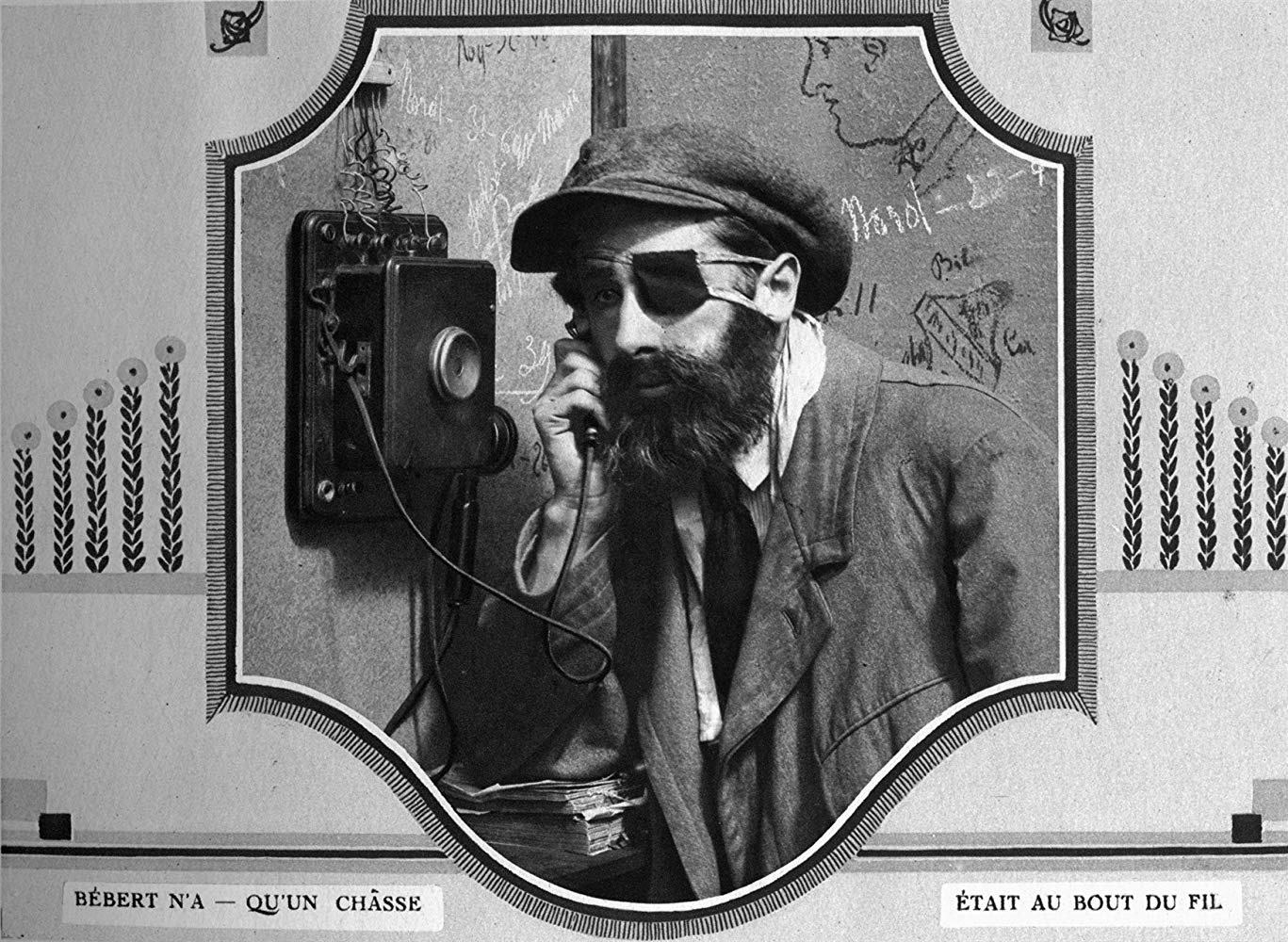
Andrew Brunelle as "The One-Eyed Man"

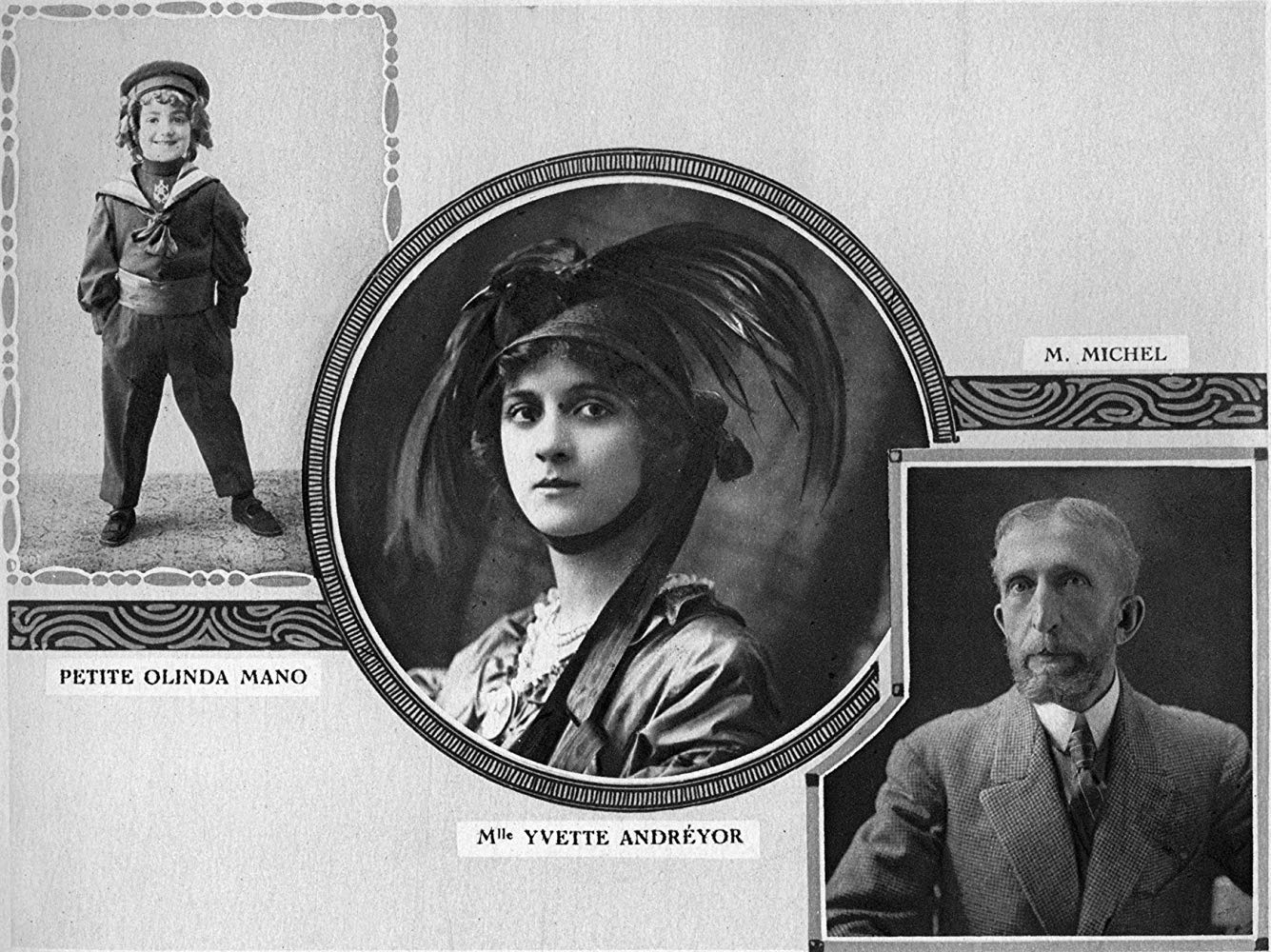
Yvette Andréyor as Jacqueline, Olinda Mano as Little Jean, and Gaston Michel as Kerjean

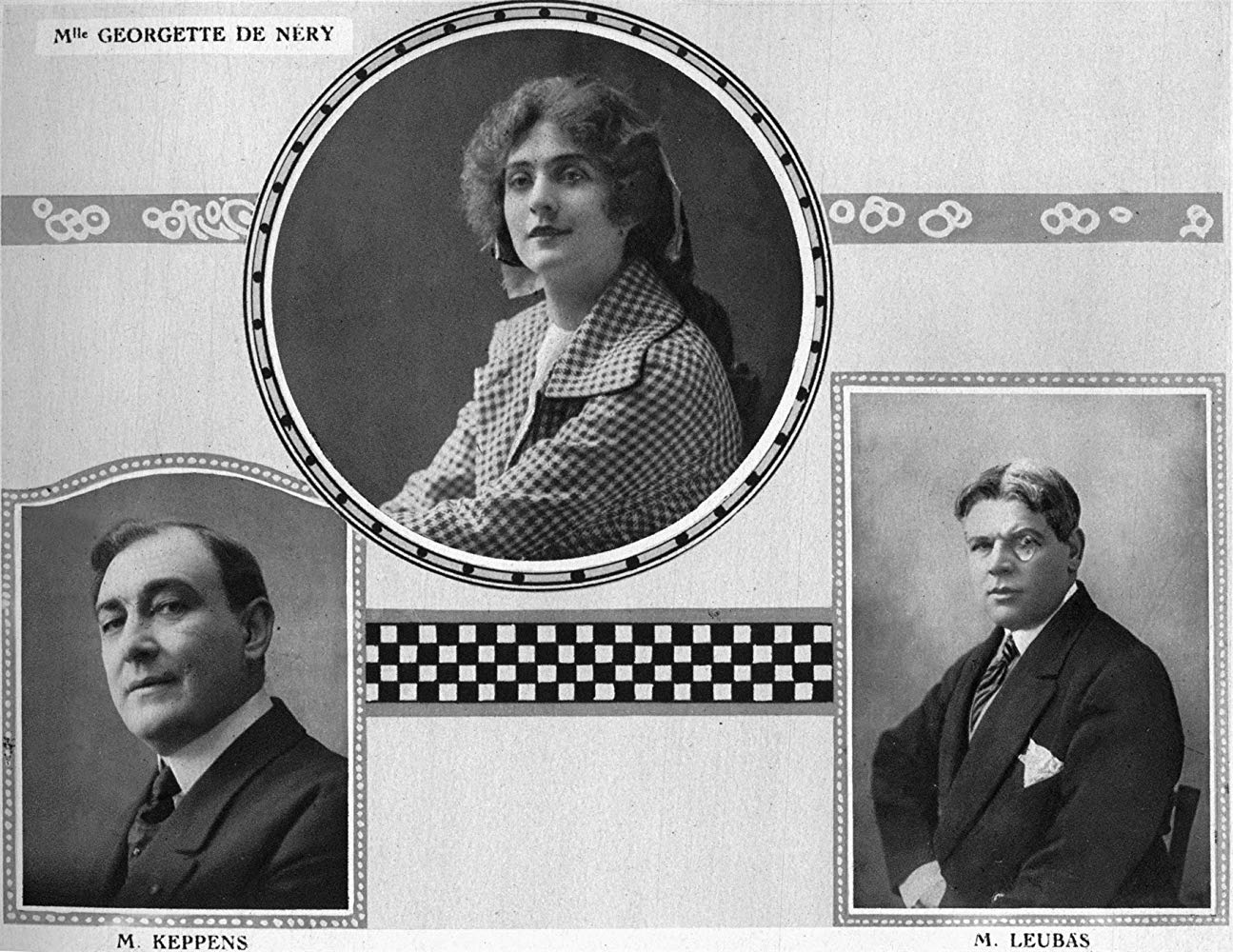
Georgette De Nerys as Primerose, Émile Keppens as Milton, and Louis Leubas as Favraux

== See also ==
- Judex
- Judex (1916 film)
- Judex (1934 film)
- Judex (1963 film)
- List of film serials
- List of film serials by studio
