= Barrabas (film) =

1920 film

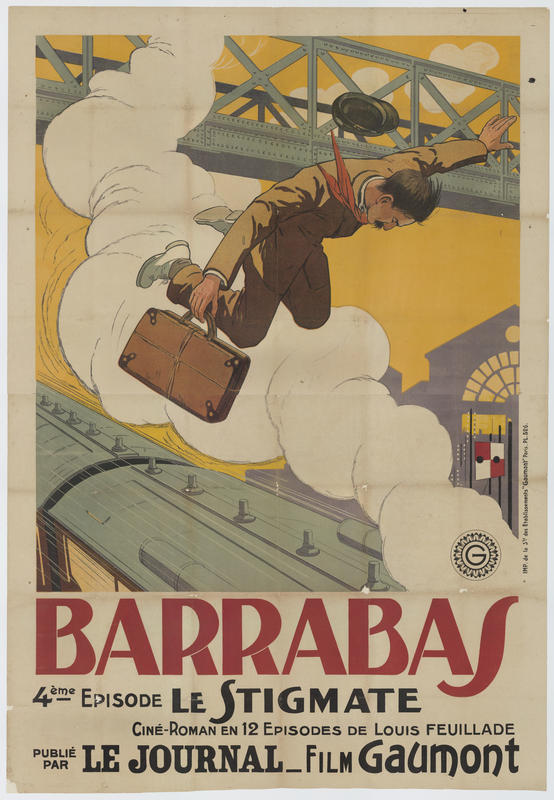
- Directed by: Louis Feuillade
- Written by: Louis Feuillade
- Produced by: Louis Feuillade
- Starring: Fernand Herrmann, Édouard Mathé
- Cinematography: Maurice Champreux, Georges Lafont, Léon Morizet
- Edited by: Maurice Champreux
- Release date: 1920
- Country: France
- Language: Silent film

Barrabas is a 1920 French silent crime thriller film serial directed and written by Louis Feuillade.

== Plot ==
Rudolph Strelitz, known as 'Barrabas', is the brutal leader of an underground gang who causes mayhem and destruction to the lives of civilized people. A lawyer, Claude Varèse, is strongly determined to bring Strelitz to justice for the purpose of revenge, after his father was wrongly guillotined for the murder of Laure d'Hérigny, a mistress of a missing American millionaire. Later Claude Varèse's sister, Françoise, is then abducted by the evil Dr Lucius, one of Barrabas's henchmen.

This plot summary appeared in the book Zones of Anxiety:

The prologue situates us prior to the war, in 1914, at a train station, where a reunion between an orphaned brother and sister, Jacques (Fernand Hermann) and Françoise Varèse (Blanche Montel), is taking place.Accompanying Jacques to the station is his good friend, Raoul (Edouard Mathé).In short order, Jacques and Raoul are off to a party in Passy thrown by their friend, Laure. At the party we are introduced to Rudolf Strelitz (Gaston Michel), a Parisian financier, and Lewis Mortimer, a rich American and soon-to-be philanthropist to the trustworthy itinerant merchants, Biscotin and Biscotine (husband and wife), who rescued Mortimer from a vicious assault on his way to Laure’s party.The epilogue ends with Mortimer’s endowment of a dairy shop to the working couple and the American’s request to be godfather to their firstborn child.

With the beginning of the first episode, now set in 1919, the world has considerably altered.As Feuillade’s scenario notes,“Five years have passed.The war has shaken the world.” The war years quickly and skillfully elided, we are left to examine these changes in more prosaic but perhaps more revelatory manner. Biscotin (Biscot) and his wife (Jane Rollette) are featured at the opening of their new store; Raoul and Françoise are engaged; and Laure is concerned about her absent lover, Mortimer, from whom she has received only letters but has not seen over the last five years.As the shop owners bemoan the missing godfather (they now have a son), the film cuts to the story of Jacques Rougier.

Rougier’s story picks up the missing “father” scenario, for Rougier has just been released from prison for the earlier attack on Mortimer. However, Rougier is but an alias to protect his family; his true name is Joseph d’Albane, the father of single mother and war widow, Simone Delpierre (Lugane). Rougier/d’Albane hides his criminal past from Simone, but le stigmate, a gang tattoo, is visible on the repentant father and serves as a trace of his vulnerability.Despite his best efforts, Rougier is drawn quickly back into the web of crime.The agent of his recidivism is no less than Strelitz, the Parisian financier introduced in the prologue, who we now learn runs the criminal gang. Strelitz, much like the banker Favraux when we first see him, puts little value on family ties beyond financial gain. Strelitz uses the family to blackmail Rougier and at one point announces that his superior strength can be attributed to the very lack of familial ties: “Strelitz is stronger than you, and he holds you, Strelitz does not have a family.”To put this another way, Strelitz the banker is beyond shame and not susceptible to the morality of bourgeois family life.He then frames Rougier for the murder of Laure (whose questions on Mortimer’s absence jeopardize another Strelitz plot).Captured and convicted, Rougier faces execution.Enter the orphan, Jacques Varèse, the attorney for Rougier’s defense.Despite considerable circumstantial evidence, Varèse believes in his client’s innocence. However, Rougier will not aid in his own defense due to his sense of family honor, and he dies without telling Simone of his arrest and conviction. Varèse, still believing in Rougier’s innocence, continues the investigation into the convict’s past with the aid of a coded testament left by Rougier.

However, Varèse awakens one morning to find the mark (the identifying tattoo) of the outlaw gang, Barrabas, sketched on his arm. When Varèse attempts to confront the leader of the gang, Strelitz, about these marks, the mastermind informs him that the mark signifies his true destiny, for Rougier was Varèse’s father. Varèse’s past, then, is “a heritage of blood, madness, and crime.” As Varèse had believed he was an orphan, the information is both shocking and plausible.The revelation thus frames the entire narrative.What had begun as an investigation into Rougier’s past becomes a necessary clarification of Varèse’s own history.

== Cast ==
- Fernand Herrmann ... L'avocat Jacques Varèse
- Édouard Mathé ... Raoul de Nérac
- Gaston Michel ... Rudolph Strélitz
- Georges Biscot ... Biscotin
- Blanche Montel ... Françoise Varèse
- Jeanne Rollette ... Biscotine
- Albert Mayer ... Rougier
- Edmond Bréon ... Dr. Lucius
- Lugane ... Simne Delpierre
- Lyne Stanka ... Laure d'Herigny
- Violette Jyl ... Noëlle Maupré
- Laurent Morléas ... Laugier
- Olinda Mano ... La petite Odette

== Episodes ==
| No. | French Title | Runtime |
|---|---|---|
| 1 | "Prologue; La Maîtresse du Juif Errant" | 77 mins. |
| 2 | "La Justice des hommes" | 39 mins. |
| 3 | "La Villa des Glycines" | 40 mins. |
| 4 | "Le Stigmate" | 39 mins. |
| 5 | "Nöelle Maupré" | 39 mins. |
| 6 | "La Fille du condamné" | 39 mins. |
| 7 | "Les Ailes de Satan" | 39 mins. |
| 8 | "Le Manoir mystérieux" | 40 mins. |
| 9 | "L'Otage" | 40 mins. |
| 10 | "L'Oubliette" | 38 mins. |
| 11 | "Le Revenant" | 38 mins. |
| 12 | "Le Justice" | 38 mins. |
