= Édouard Mathé =

French actor

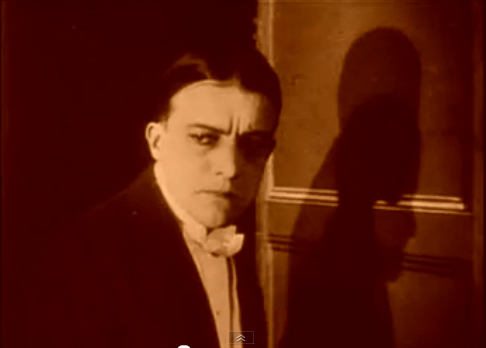
- Édouard Mathé in Les Vampires (1915)
- Born: 1886; Courbevoie
- Died: 1934 (aged 47–48); Belgium
- Occupation: actor
- Years active: 1914–1925

Édouard Mathé (French pronunciation: [edwaʁ mate]; 1886–1934) was a French silent film actor.

He starred in some 51 films between 1914 and 1924.

Mathe appeared Barabbas in 1920. He regularly appeared in films directed by Louis Feuillade, such as the 1915 Les Vampires serial, the 1916 Judex serial, Tih Minh in 1918 and Parisette in 1921.

He died in Brussels in 1934.

== Selected filmography ==
- Judex (1916)
- La Nouvelle Mission de Judex (1918)
- The Two Girls (1921)
- The Two Boys (1924)
