= Gaston Michel =

French actor

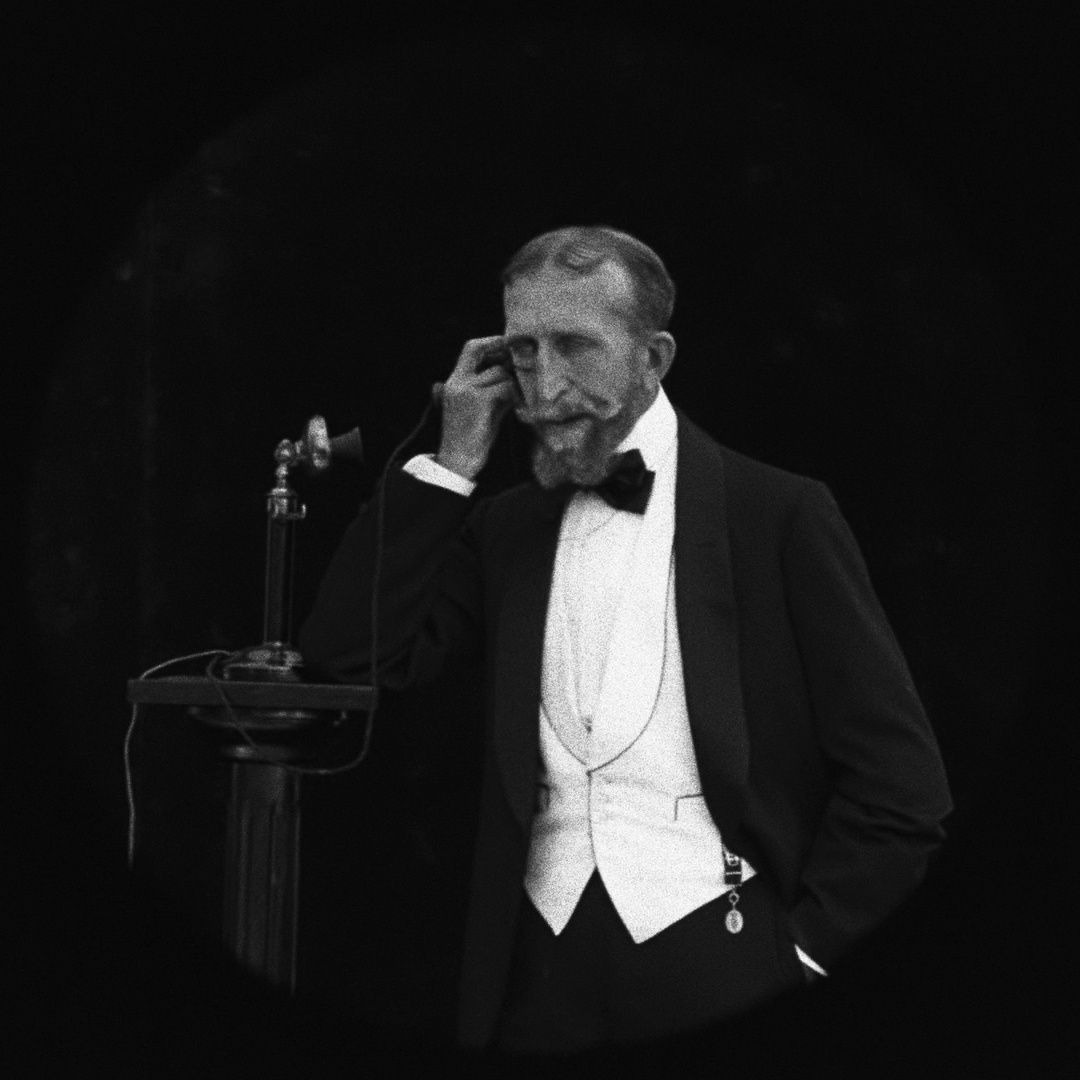
- Gaston Michel in Tih Minh (1918)
- Born: Gaston Auguste Michel; 1856; France
- Died: November 1921 (aged 64–65); Lisbon, Portugal
- Occupation: actor
- Years active: 1913–1921

Gaston Michel (1856 – November 1921) was a French silent film actor. He starred in some 40 films between 1913 and his death in 1921.

He died in November 1921, in Lisbon, Portugal.

== Selected filmography ==
- Les Vampires (1915)
- Judex (1916)
- La Nouvelle Mission de Judex (1918)
- Tih Minh (1918)
- Barabbas (1920)
- Parisette (1921)
- The Two Girls (1921)
