= René Ferté =

Swiss actor (1903–1958)

- Born: 23 March 1903; La Chaux-de-Fonds, Canton of Neuchâtel, Switzerland
- Died: 21 September 1958 (aged 55)
- Other names: René Tissot-Daguette; René Tissot-Ferté
- Occupation: Actor
- Years active: 1923–1940 (film)

René Ferté (1903–1958) was a Swiss actor who worked principally in the French cinema, from 1923 onwards. He is mostly known for performances in a series of silent films directed by Jean Epstein. His roles in sound films were generally less notable, though he appeared in Fritz Lang's Le Testament du docteur Mabuse (French version), and he took the title role in the 1934 sound remake of Judex. After the outbreak of the Second World War he ceased working in films.

== Selected filmography ==
- 1923 : L'Auberge rouge (The Red Inn), directed by Jean Epstein
- 1926 : Mauprat, directed by Jean Epstein
- 1927 : La Glace à trois faces (The Three-Sided Mirror), directed by Jean Epstein
- 1927 : Six et demi onze, directed by Jean Epstein
- 1929 : Sa tête, directed by Jean Epstein
- 1930 : Nos maîtres les domestiques (Our Masters, the Servants), directed by Hewitt Claypoole Grantham-Hayes
- 1931 : Le Train des suicidés (The Train of Suicides), directed by Edmond T. Gréville
- 1933 : Le Testament du docteur Mabuse, directed by Fritz Lang and René Sti (French language version)
- 1934 : Judex 34, directed by Maurice Champreux
- 1938 : Le Tigre du Bengale (Der Tiger von Eschnapur), directed by Richard Eichberg (French language version)
- 1938 : Le Tombeau hindou (Das indische Grabmal), directed by Richard Eichberg (French language version)
- 1939 : Vidocq, directed by Jacques Daroy
- 1943 : Untel père et fils (The Heart of a Nation), directed by Julien Duvivier (filmed 1939-40)
