= Judex (1934 film) =

- Directed by: Maurice Champreux
- Written by: Arthur Bernède; Louis Feuillade; Maurice Champreux
- Produced by: Charles Le Fraper
- Starring: René Ferté; Louise Lagrange; Paule Andral
- Cinematography: Georges Raulet; Charles Suin
- Music by: Marius-François Gaillard
- Release date: 5 May 1934
- Running time: 95 minutes
- Country: France
- Language: French

Judex is a 1934 French crime film directed by Maurice Champreux and starring René Ferté, Louise Lagrange and Paule Andral. It features the hero Judex.

== Cast ==
- René Ferté as Judex
- Louise Lagrange as Jacqueline
- Paule Andral as Madame de Trémeuse
- Marcel Vallée as Cocantin
- Alexandre Mihalesco as Le banquier Favraux
- Jean Lefebvre as Roger de Trémeuse
- René Navarre as Kerjean
- Blanche Bernis as Diana Monti
- Jean Borelli as Le petit Jean
- Nino Constantini as Moralès
- Madeleine Guitty as La bonne de Cocantin
- Raymond Blot
- Yvette Dantin
- Charles Lemontier
- Aya Valmita
- Le Petit Patachou as Le môme Réglisse

== Bibliography ==
- Hardy, Phil. The BFI Companion to Crime. A & C Black, 1997.
