= Fernand Herrmann =

French actor (1886–1925)

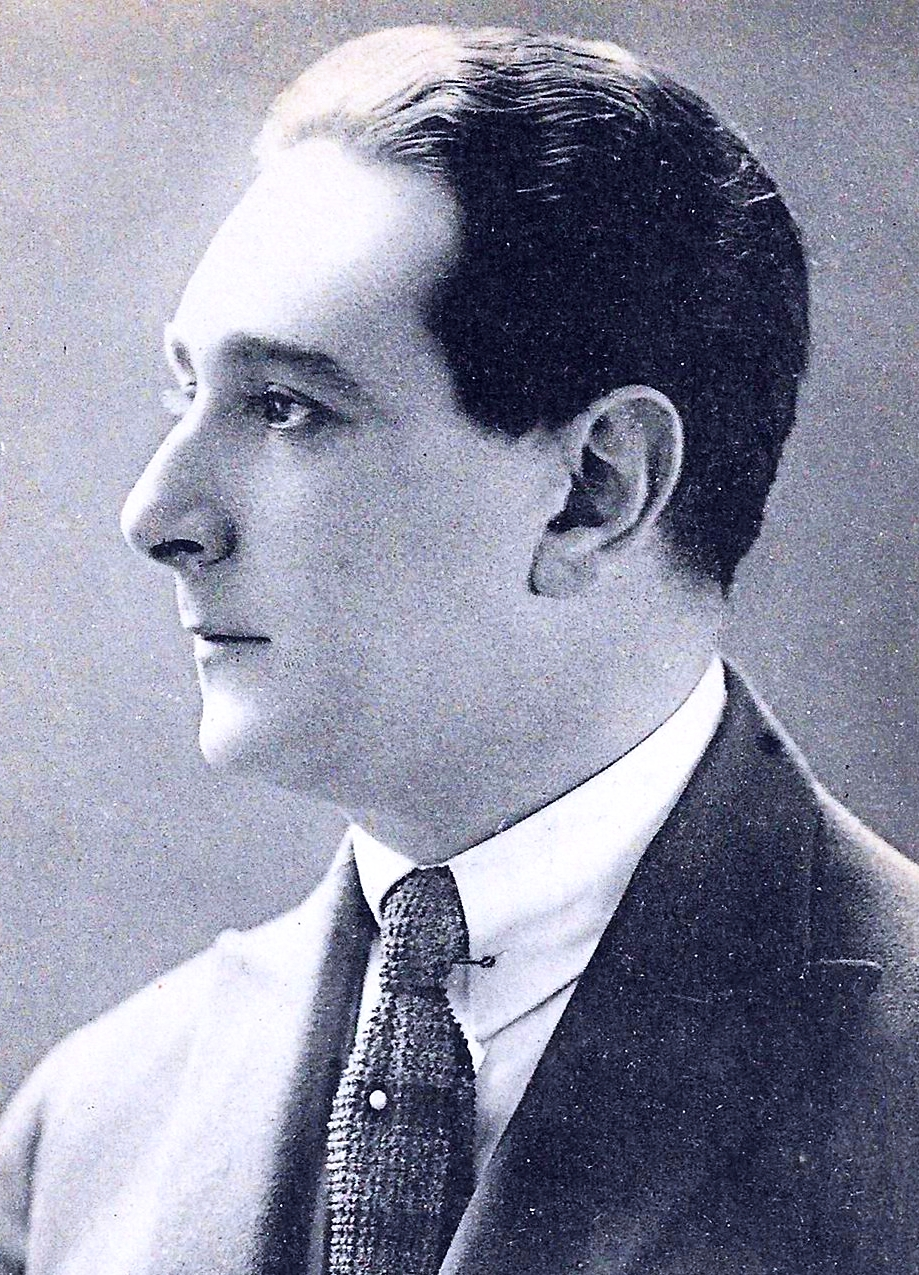
- Fernand Herrmann
- Born: 21 February 1886; Paris, France
- Died: April 1925 (aged 39)
- Occupation: actor
- Years active: 1914—1925

Fernand Herrmann (21 February 1886 – April 1925) was a French silent film actor.

He starred in some 26 films between 1914 and 1925.

He appeared in films such as the Louis Feuillade-directed Les Vampires serial that ran in installments from 1915 to 1916, and Barabbas in 1920.
