= Maurice Champreux =

French film director, cinematographer and editor

- Born: 21 May 1893; France
- Died: 15 November 1976 (aged 83); Paris, France
- Occupations: Director, Editor, Cinematographer
- Years active: 1918–1936 (film)

Maurice Champreux (1893–1976) was a French film director, cinematographer and editor.

== Biography ==
Maurice Champreux married with Isabelle Feuillade. She is the daughter of famous French film director Louis Feuillade.

Maurice and Isabelle Champreux had a son, Jacques Champreux who became an actor, screenwriter and film director.

== Selected filmography ==
=== Director ===
- After Love (1924)
- The Five Cents of Lavarede (1927)
- Let's Touch Wood (1933)
- Judex (1934)

=== Cinematographer ===
- Barrabas (1920)

== Bibliography ==
- Goble, Alan. The Complete Index to Literary Sources in Film. Walter de Gruyter, 1999.
