= Louis Feuillade =

French film director of the silent era

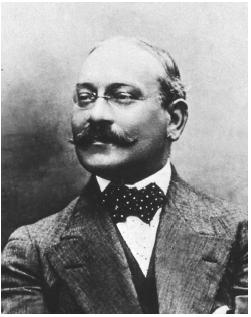
- Born: 19 February 1873; Lunel, French Third Republic
- Died: 25 February 1925 (aged 52); Nice, France
- Occupations: Film director, screenwriter, film producer, journalist, poet
- Years active: 1905–1925
- Spouse: Jeanne-Leontine Jaujou (m. 1895)

Louis Feuillade (French: [lwi fœjad]; 19 February 1873 – 25 February 1925) was a French filmmaker of the silent era. Between 1906 and 1924, he directed over 630 films. He is primarily known for the crime serials Fantômas, Les Vampires and Judex made between 1913 and 1916, which he produced and directed while he was the artistic director of Gaumont.

== Early life and career ==
Feuillade was born in Lunel, Hérault, to Barthélémy Feuillade, a modest wine merchant, and Marie Avesque. From an early age, he showed a deep interest in literature and created numerous drama and vaudeville projects. His excessively academic poems were occasionally published in local newspapers, and he acquired a reputation for his articles devoted to bullfighting. At twelve, he was sent by his parents to a Catholic seminary in Carcassonne, which has been credited for his gothic stylization in his later career. His biographer Francis Lacassin has suggested that "the strange, surrealist flashes of anarchy which spark through the work of this pillar of society can only be explained as some sort of unconscious revolt to which he gave rein in his dreams — that is to say, in his films." He then began his compulsory military service in 1891 until 1895, when he married Jeanne-Leontine Jaujou on 31 October 1895. After the deaths of his parents, he went to Paris in 1902 seeking literary success, but would suffer miserably for several years.

At the beginning of 1905, he started to submit screenplays to Gaumont, and Gaumont's artistic director Alice Guy-Blaché both bought his scripts and invited Feuillade to direct them himself. Concerned about his financial difficulties and family to support, Feuillade declined the directing job in order to continue working as a journalist. At his suggestion, Guy-Blaché hired Étienne Arnaud to direct Feuillade's early screenplays at Gaumont. But, by 1906, he had gained enough confidence to start directing his own scripts, which were mostly comedies. In 1907, Guy-Blaché moved to the United States and upon her suggestion Feuillade was made Artistic Director of Gaumont. He would work for Gaumont until 1918, while at the same time producing his own films, so that by 1925, the year of his death, he estimated that he had made around 800 films. (At the time he started in cinema, a film rarely lasted more than ten minutes). He made films of all types—trick films at the beginning, modeled on those of Georges Méliès, comedies, bourgeois dramas, historical or biblical dramas, mysteries and exotic adventures—but he is remembered best for his serial films.

Louis Feuillade was the father-in-law of the French film director Maurice Champreux and the grandfather of the French actor, screenwriter, and film director Jacques Champreux.

== Serial films ==
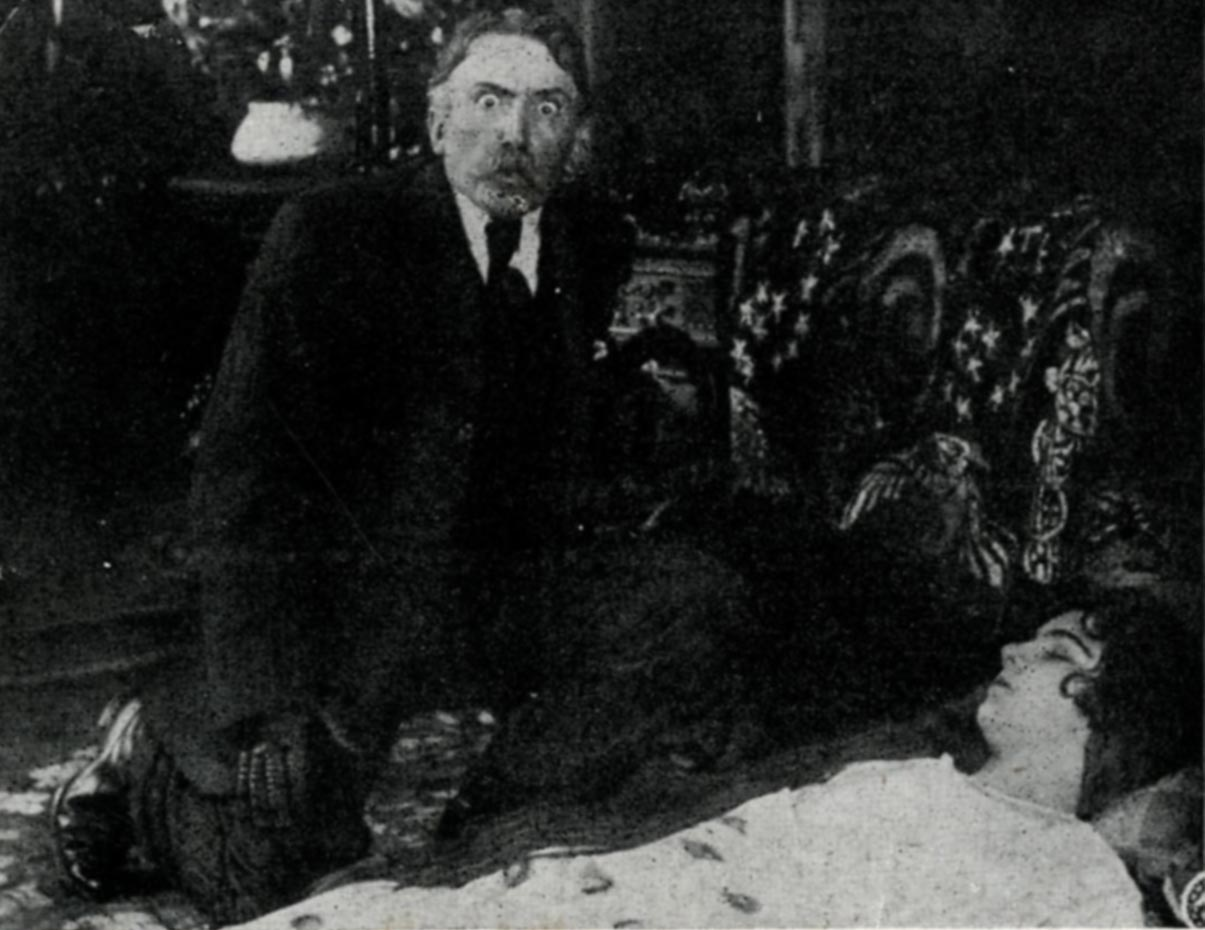
Scene from Fantômas

The Fantômas serial in 1913 was his first masterpiece, the result of a long apprenticeship—during which the series with realistic ambitions, Life as it is, played a major role. It is also the first masterpiece in what the modern critic, from both a literary and a cinematographic point of view, would later call "the fantastic realism" or the "social fantastic".

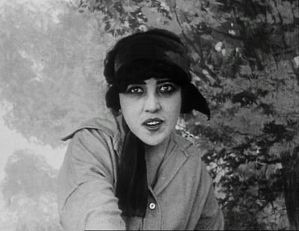
Musidora as Irma Vep in Les Vampires

He is credited with developing many of the thriller techniques used by Fritz Lang, Alfred Hitchcock, and others.

== Partial filmography ==
- 1906 The Magnitized Man, Le Coup de vent, Le Thé chez la concierge
- 1907 Tea at the Porter's House (Le Thé chez la concierge) (the oldest of his films that survives)
- 1908 The Legend of the Spinner (La Légende de la fileuse) (film with tricks, Méliès style)
- 1910-13 "Baby" serial: Baby Apache (Bébé Apache) - 1911 (Series of comedies performed by a 4-year-old child, the little Clément Mary, later René Dary - around 90 short films).
- 1911 Heliogabale (ancient drama)
- 1911-12 Serial Life as it is: The Defect (La vie telle qu'elle est: la Tare) - 1911 (dramas and realistic comedies - 14 films)
- 1913-14 Series of Fantômas (Mystery drama - 5 films)
- 1913-14 Series of Bout de Zan: Bout de Zan steals an elephant (Bout de Zan vole un éléphant) - 1913 (This serial, performed by the little René Poyen, replaces the Bébé serial - 62 short films)
- 1913-14 Series The funny Life: The Jocond (La vie drôle: le Jocond) (vaudevilles - 5 films)
- 1915 The Vampires (Les Vampires) (10 episodes)
- 1915 Bout de Zan et l'embusqué (Bout de Zan and the shirker)
- 1916 Judex (12 episodes)
- 1918 La Nouvelle Mission de Judex (12 episodes)
- 1918 Vendemiaire (Rural drama during the First-World-War - in 2 parts)
- 1918 Tih Minh (12 episodes)
- 1919 Barrabas (12 episodes)
- 1921-22 Good Mood: Seraphin or the Naked Legs (Belle Humeur: Seraphin ou les jambes nues) - 1921 (vaudevilles - 5 films)
- 1922 Parisette (12 episodes)
- 1923 Vindicta (5 stages)

== See also ==
- Irma Vep
- Marthe Vinot
- Maurice Vinot
- Georges Denola
- Julien Duvivier
