= Fantômas (disambiguation) =

Fantômas is a fictional character created by Marcel Allain and Pierre Souvestre.

Fantômas may also refer to:

- Fantômas (1913 serial), directed by Louis Feuillade
- Fantômas (1920 serial), directed by Edward Sedgwick
- Fantômas (1932 film), directed by Pál Fejös
- Fantômas (1946 film), directed by Jean Sacha
- Fantômas (1964 film), directed by André Hunebelle
- Fantômas (2027 film), an upcoming French period thriller film
- Fantômas (band), an American heavy metal supergroup
  - Fantômas (Fantômas album), 1999
- Fantômas (Amiina album), 2016
- Fantomas, a Brazilian dub name for the superhero Golden Bat

== See also ==
- Fantomex, a Marvel Comics superhero
