= Edward Lister =

Edward Lister may refer to:

- Edward Lister, Baron Udny-Lister (born 1949), British special adviser, political strategist and former politician
- Edward Lister (physician) (1556–1620), English physician
- Lord Edward Lister, a fictional Victorian-era gentleman thief, who uses John C. Raffles as an alias
