= Fantômas (1920 serial) =

1920 film directed by Edward Sedgwick

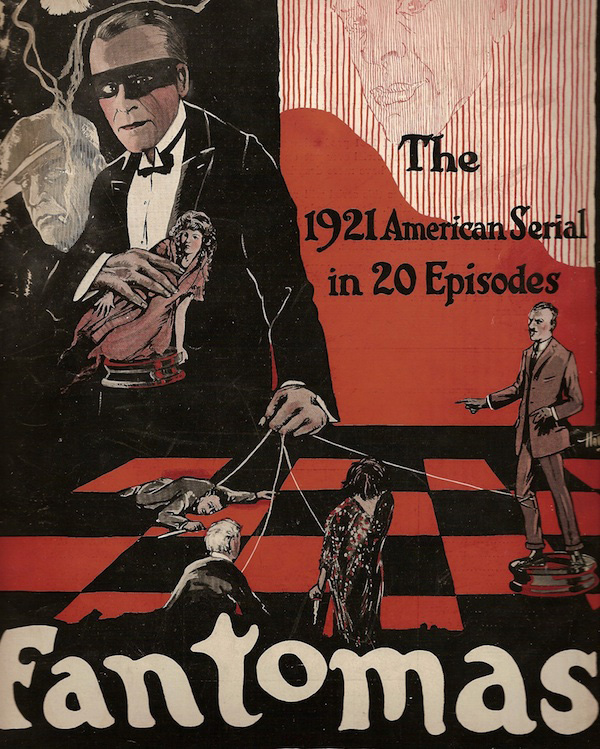
- Advert for the film
- Directed by: Edward Sedgwick
- Written by: Marcel Allain; George Eshenfelder; Edward Sedgwick; Pierre Souvestre
- Produced by: William Fox
- Starring: Edward Roseman; Edna Murphy
- Cinematography: Horace G. Plympton
- Distributed by: Fox Film Corporation
- Release date: December 19, 1920
- Running time: 20 episodes
- Country: United States
- Language: Silent (English intertitles)

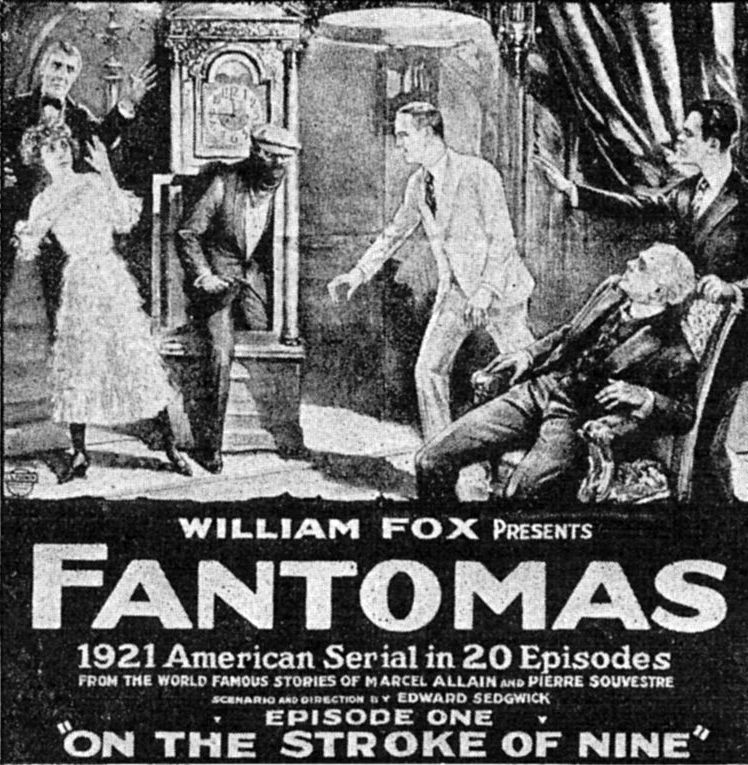
Advertisement for the first episode (1920)

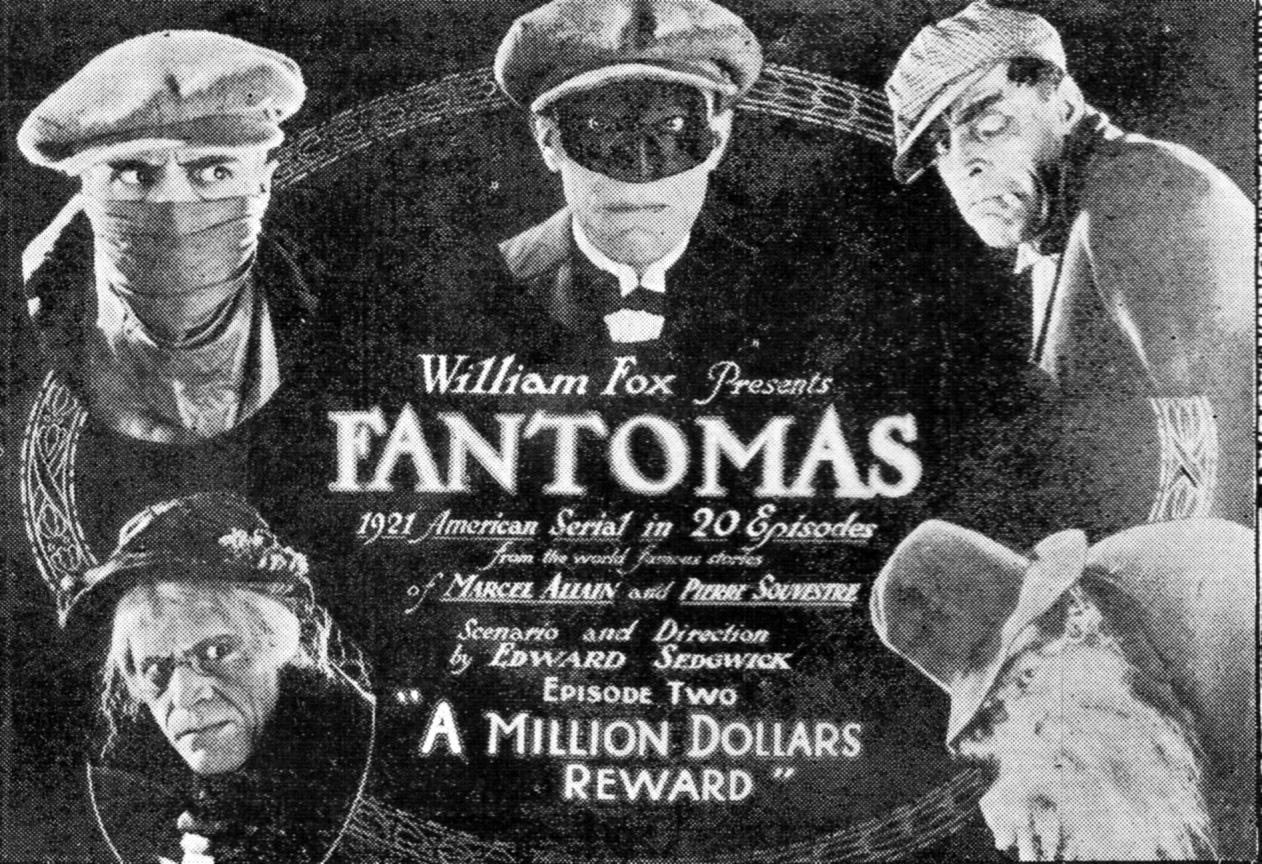
Advertisement for the second episode (1921)

Fantômas is a 1920 American crime film serial directed by Edward Sedgwick. The film is considered to be lost.

== Cast ==
- Edward Roseman as Fantômas
- Edna Murphy as Ruth Harrington
- Johnnie Walker as Jack Meredith
- Lionel Adams as Prof. James D. Harrington
- John Willard as Detective Fred Dixon
- Eve Balfour as The Woman in Black
- Rena Parker as The Countess
- Irving Brooks as The Duke
- Ben Walker as The Butler
- Henry Armetta as The Wop
- Rita Rogan

== Chapter titles ==
1. On the Stroke of Nine
2. The Million Dollar Reward
3. The Triple Peril
4. Blades of Terror
5. Heights of Horror
6. The Altar of Sacrifice
7. Flames of Destruction
8. At Death's Door
9. The Haunted Hotel
10. The Fatal Card
11. The Phantom Sword
12. The Danger Signal
13. On the Count of Three
14. The Blazing Train
15. The Sacred Necklace
16. The Phantom Shadow
17. The Price of Fang Wu
18. Double-Crossed
19. The Hawk's Prey
20. The Hell Ship

== See also ==
- List of film serials
- List of film serials by studio
- List of lost films
