= Fantômas (1913 serial) =

1913 film

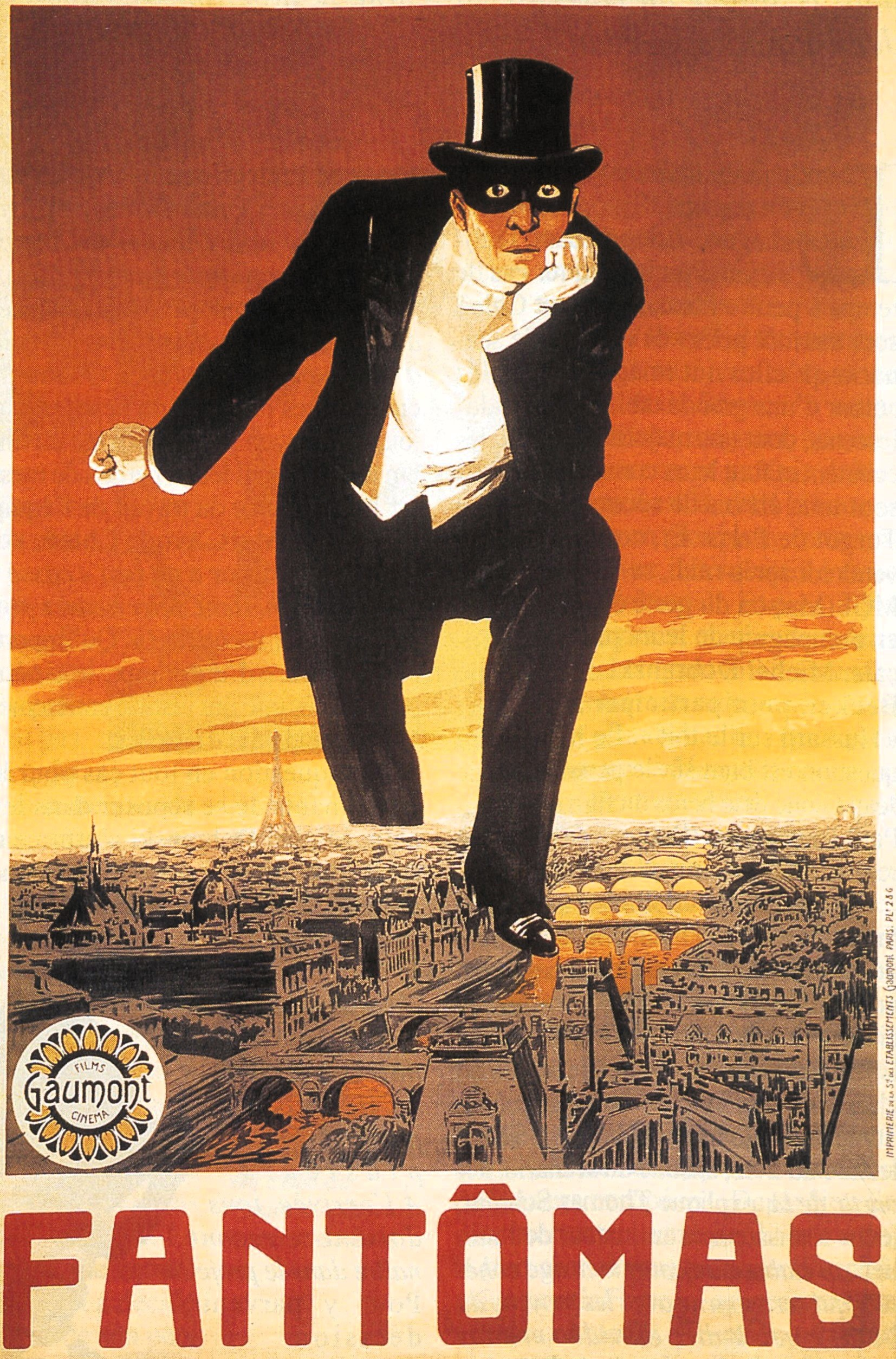
- Film poster
- Directed by: Louis Feuillade
- Written by: Marcel Allain; Louis Feuillade; Pierre Souvestre
- Produced by: Romeo Bosetti
- Starring: René Navarre; Edmond Bréon; Georges Melchior; Renée Carl
- Cinematography: Georges Guérin
- Distributed by: Gaumont
- Release date: 9 May 1913
- Running time: 337 minutes Episode 1: 54 minutes Episode 2: 62 minutes Episode 3: 90 minutes Episode 4: 60 minutes Episode 5: 71 minutes
- Country: France
- Language: Silent with French intertitles

Fantômas (pronounced [fɑ̃toˈmas]) is a French silent crime film serial directed by Louis Feuillade, based on the novel of the same name. The five episodes, initially released throughout 1913–14, were restored under the direction of Jacques Champreaux and re-released in 2006. It was inspired by Italian-French director and actor Romeo Bosetti, a colleague with Feuillade, who served as producer.

== Series ==
"In the Shadow of the Guillotine"

"Juve vs. Fantômas"

"The Dead Man Who Killed"

"Fantômas vs. Fantômas"

"The False Magistrate"

The series consists of five episodes, each an hour to an hour and a half in length, which end in cliffhangers. Episodes one and three end with Fantômas making a last-minute escape, and the end of the second entry has Fantômas blowing up Lady Beltham's manor house with Juve and Fandor, the two heroes, still inside. The subsequent episodes begin with a recap of the story that has gone before. Each film is further divided into three or more chapters that do not end in cliffhangers.

1. Fantômas I: À l'ombre de la guillotine ("Fantômas: In the Shadow of the Guillotine") (1913)
  1. "Le Vol du Royal Palace Hotel" ("The Theft at the Royal Palace Hotel")
  2. "La Disparition de Lord Beltham" ("The Disappearance of Lord Beltham")
  3. "Autour de l'échafaud" ("By the Guillotine")
2. Fantômas II: Juve contre Fantômas ("Juve vs. Fantômas") (1913)
  1. "La Catastrophe du Simplon-Express" ("Disaster on the Simplon Express")
  2. "Au "Crocodile" ("At the Crocodile")
  3. "La Villa hantée" ("The Haunted Villa")
  4. "L'Homme noir" ("The Man in Black")
3. Fantômas III: Le Mort Qui Tue ("Fantômas: The Dead Man Who Killed") (1913)
  1. "Le Drame de la rue Norvins" ("The Tragedy in Rue Norvins")
  2. "L'Enquête de Fandor" ("Fandor's Investigation")
  3. "Le Collier de la princesse" ("The Princess's Necklace")
  4. "Le Banquier Nanteuil" ("The Banker Nanteuil")
  5. "Elizabeth Dollon"
  6. "Les Gants de peau humaine" ("The Human Skin Gloves")
4. Fantômas IV: Fantômas contre Fantômas ("Fantômas vs. Fantômas") (1914)
  1. "Fantômas et l'opinion publique" ("Fantômas and Public Opinion")
  2. "Le Mur qui saigne" ("The Wall that Bleeds")
  3. "Fantômas contre Fantômas" ("Fantômas vs. Fantômas")
  4. "Règlement de comptes" ("Getting Even")
5. Fantômas V: Le Faux Magistrat ("The False Magistrate") (1914)
  1. "Prologue" ("The Theft at the Château des Loges")
  2. "Le Prisonnier de Louvain" ("The Prisoner of Louvain")
  3. "Monsieur Charles Pradier, juge d'instruction" ("Charles Pradier, Examining Magistrate")
  4. "Le Magistrat cambrioleur" ("The Burglar Judge")
  5. "L'Extradé de Louvain" ("The Extradited Man")

== Cast ==
- René Navarre as Fantômas aka Gurn, Tom Bob and many other aliases
- Edmund Breon as Inspector Juve
- Georges Melchior as Jérôme Fandor, reporter for the Capital newspaper and Juve's collaborator
- Renée Carl as Lady Beltham, Fantômas' mistress
- Jane Faber as Princesse Danidoff
- Volbert as Valgrand
- Naudier as Nibet
- Maillard as Valgrand's dresser
- Yvette Andréyor as Josephine

== Reception ==
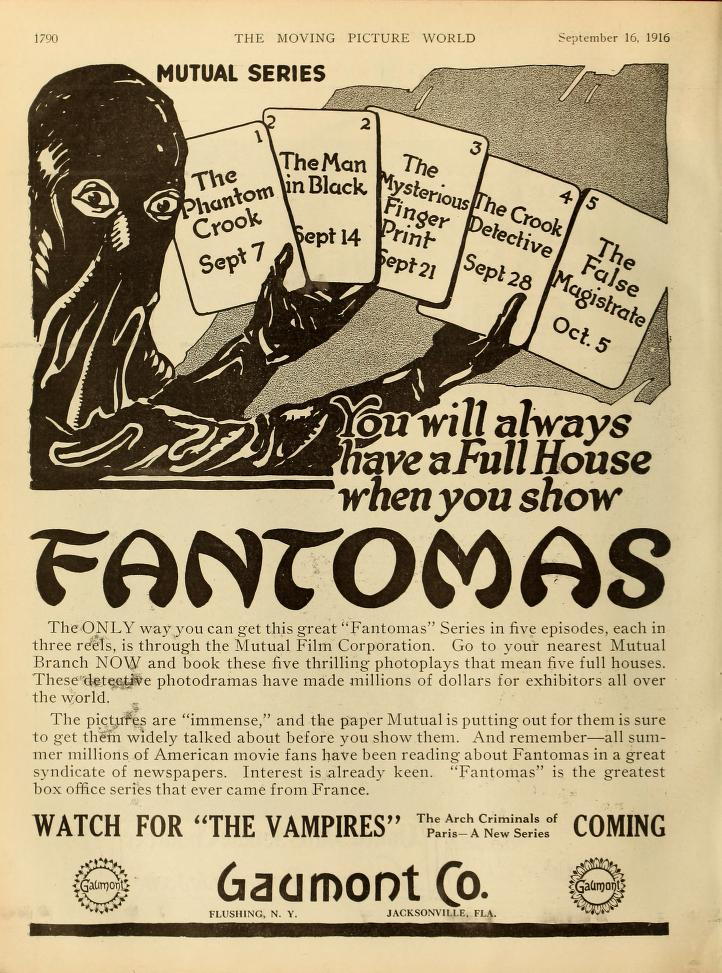
Advertisement (1916)

Fantômas was enormously popular upon its release in France, and made Navarre, who played Fantômas, an overnight celebrity. In a rave review from a 1914 issue of the French journal Chronique cinématographique, critic Maurice Raynal wrote that "there is nothing in this involved, compact, and concentrated film but explosive genius".

In his 1973 critical review of the Fantômas serial, Peter Schofer observed that contrary to some modern understandings of the series, Fantômas was not interpreted by its audience as a suspense film. Based on a previously published and widely read newspaper serial, audiences of the time were already extensively familiar with the plot, characters, and outcome of the story, making the film much more about how the story might develop as opposed to what might happen next.

== See also ==
- List of film serials
- List of film serials by studio
