= John Farmery =

John Farmery may refer to:

- John Farmery (politician)
- John Farmery (physician)
