= Fantômas (1932 film) =

1932 film

- Directed by: Paul Fejos
- Written by: Marcel Allain (novel); Pierre Souvestre (novel); Anne Mauclair; Pál Fejös
- Produced by: Pierre Braunberger; Roger Richebé
- Starring: Jean Galland; Tania Fédor; Thomy Bourdelle; Jean Worms
- Cinematography: Peverell Marley
- Edited by: Denise Batcheff
- Production company: Les Établissements Braunberger-Richebé
- Distributed by: Les Établissements Braunberger-Richebé
- Release date: 20 May 1932
- Running time: 91 minutes
- Country: France
- Language: French

Fantômas is a 1932 French crime film directed by Paul Fejos and starring Jean Galland, Tania Fédor and Thomy Bourdelle. It features the popular pulp character Fantômas, a supercriminal, and his nemesis inspector Juve. It was loosely based on the original Fantômas novel by Marcel Allain and Pierre Souvestre. The film was one of a number of Fantômas adaptations made during the 20th century.

== Plot ==
The Marquise de Langrune hosts a gathering of friends at her castle in Beaulieu, including Lord Beltham, who arrives with a large sum of money for her. The criminal Fantômas murders the marquise, prompting Inspector Juve to investigate the crime and pursue the killer.

== Cast ==
- Jean Galland as Fantômas / Étienne Rambert
- Tania Fédor as Lady Beltham
- Thomy Bourdelle as Inspector Juve
- Jean Worms as Lord Beltham
- Georges Rigaud as Charles Rambert
- Anielka Elter as la princesse Sonia Davidoff
- Marie-Laure as la marquise de Langrune
- Gaston Modot as Firmin, le valet de la marquise
- Roger Karl as Bonnet, le président de tribunal
- Maurice Schutz as l'abbé Sicot
- Philippe Richard as Michel, l'adjoint de Juve
- Georges Mauloy as le professeur Gabriel
- Paul Azaïs as le mécano

== Bibliography ==
- Hardy, Phil (ed.), The BFI Companion to Crime. University of California Press, 1997.
