= Lord Lister (disambiguation) =

Lord Lister often refers to Joseph Lister (1827–1912), British surgeon and antiseptic pioneer.

Lord Lister may also refer to:

- Lord Edward Lister, a fictional Victorian-era gentleman thief, who uses John C. Raffles as an alias
- Edward Lister, Baron Udny-Lister (born 1949), British special adviser and political strategist
