= Jane Faber =

Belgian actress

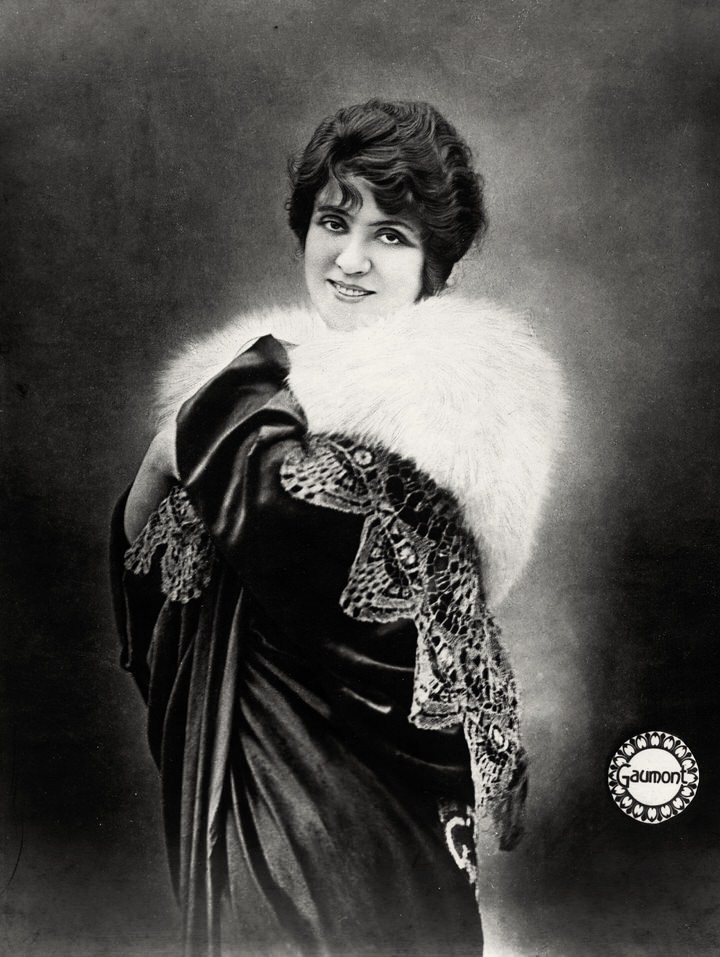
- Jane Faber as Princess Danidoff, in 1913
- Born: Jeanne Théodorine de Smet; October 19, 1880; Ixelles, Belgium
- Died: May 13, 1968 (aged 88); Clichy-la-Garenne, France
- Occupation: Actress
- Spouse: Gabriel Auguste Ferdinand Ducuing

Jane Faber (19 October 1880 – 13 May 1968) was a Belgian stage actress, in residence at the Comédie-Française from 1910 to 1951. She also appeared in over twenty films.

== Early life ==
Jeanne Théodorine de Smet was born in Ixelles. She trained for a stage career at the Conservatoire de Paris, a student of Charles le Bargy.

== Career ==
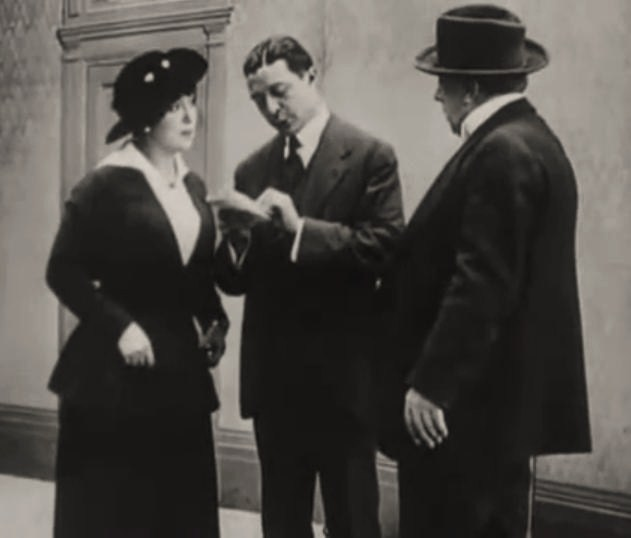
Ceux de chez nous (1915 film); from left to right, Jane Faber, Henri Desfontaines, and André Antoine

At age 30, Faber became a resident at the Comédie-Française, and she maintained that status for over forty years. She appeared at the theatre in Les Précieuses ridicules (1910), Poil de carotte (1912), La marche nuptiale (1913), L'Amour médecin (1920), Les Fourberies de Scapin (1922), Le Monde où l’on s’ennuie (1937), Chacun sa vérité (1937), La Dispute (1938), La reine morte (1942), and Tartuffe (1949), among other plays. In 1922, she was part of the tercentenary celebrations for Molière at the Comédie-Française.

Faber also appeared in 18 silent films made in France, including L'Âme du violon (1911), Miss Rovel (1921), and L'Écuyère (1922), and five Fantômas films as "Princess Sonia Danidoff", in 1913 and 1914. She made a few sound pictures in French, later in her career, the last being L'Affaire Maurizius (1954, known as The Maurizius Affair or On Trial in English).

Faber was considered fashionable in the 1910s, and her gowns were featured and described in periodicals and newspapers as exemplary of the latest Paris styles. In 1915, she, Cécile Sorel and Marcelle Lender held a charity bazaar, selling cake and champagne at a Paris hotel for war relief.

== Personal life ==
Faber married the French naval officer Gabriel Auguste Ferdinand Ducuing, who died in 1940. She died in 1968, aged 87 years, at Clichy-la-Garenne in France. Her gravesite is in Pére Lachaise cemetery in Paris.
