= Thierry Martens =

Belgian short story writer and comic

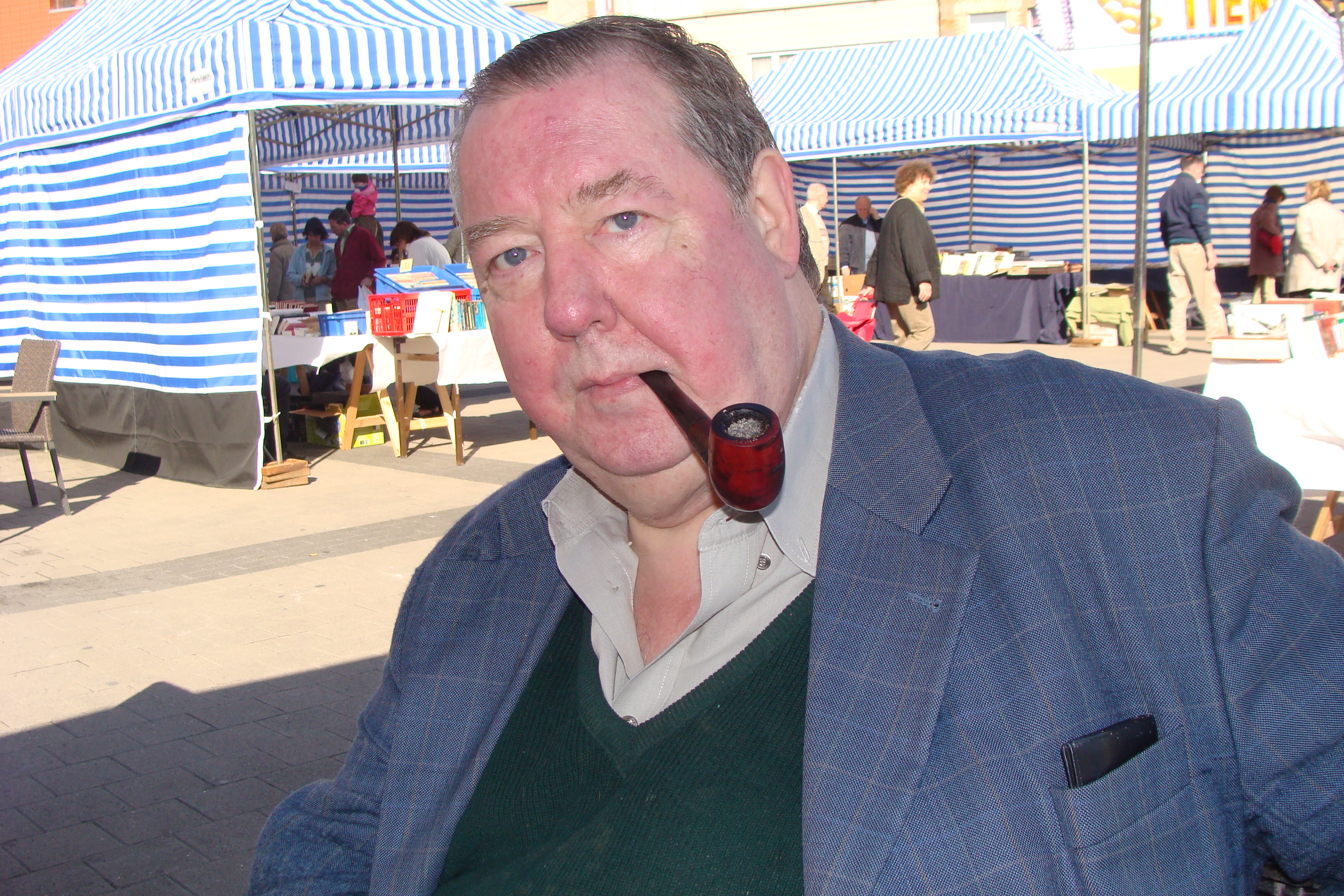
- Thierry Martens, 2010
- Born: 29 January 1942; Louvain
- Died: 27 June 2011 (aged 69); Saint-Josse-ten-Noode
- Other names: Yves Varende

Thierry Martens (29 January 1942 – 27 June 2011) was a Belgian author who wrote science fiction, detective novels, short stories and comics under the pen name Yves Varende.

== Career ==
Martens was the editor of the Franco-Belgian comics magazine Spirou between 1968 and 1977. He published several highly documented anthologies and studies about popular "Holmesian-style" French-language crime novels of the early twentieth century. Martens also authored some dark Holmesian pastiches in French as well as super-science novels.

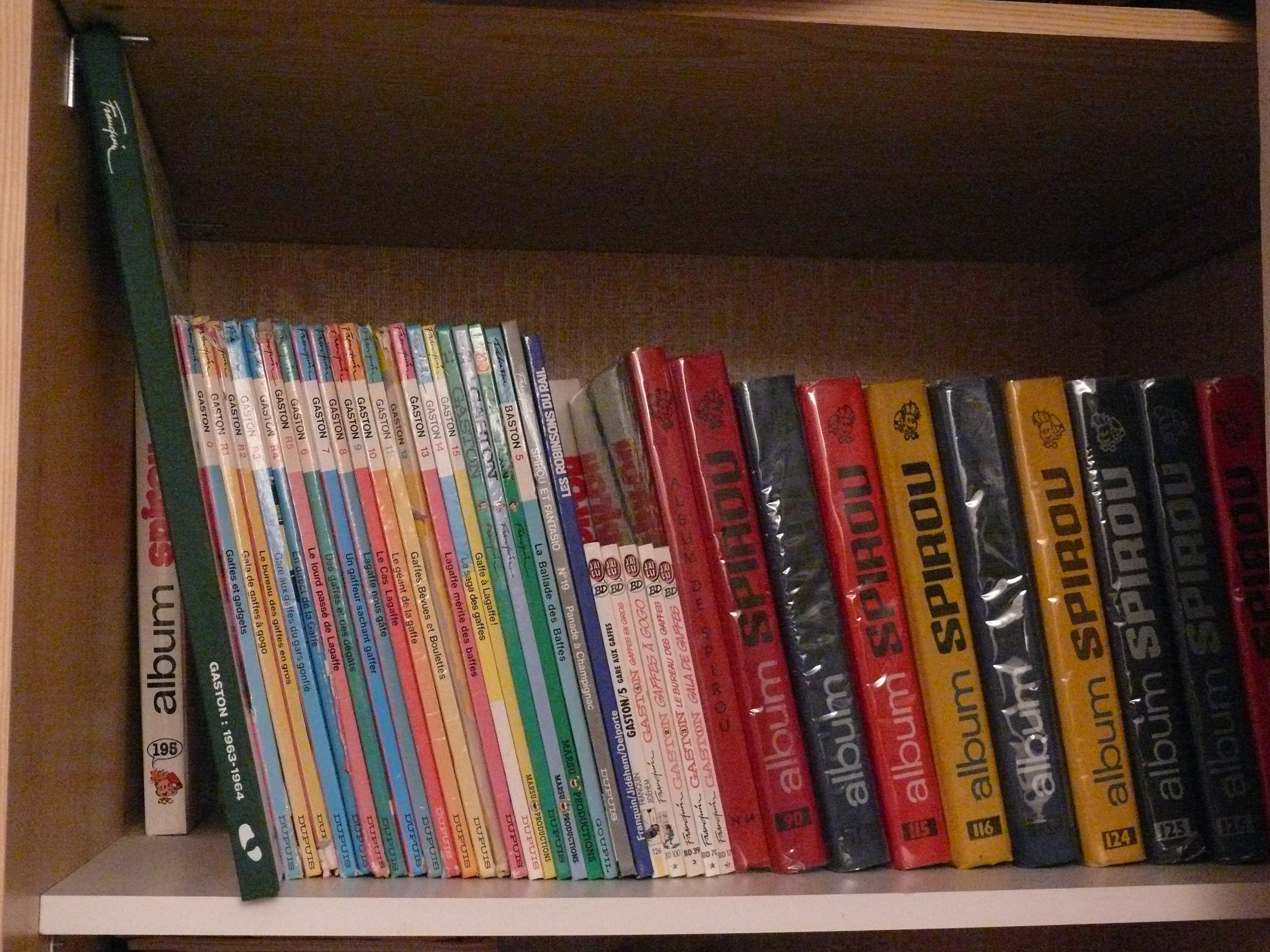

== Works ==
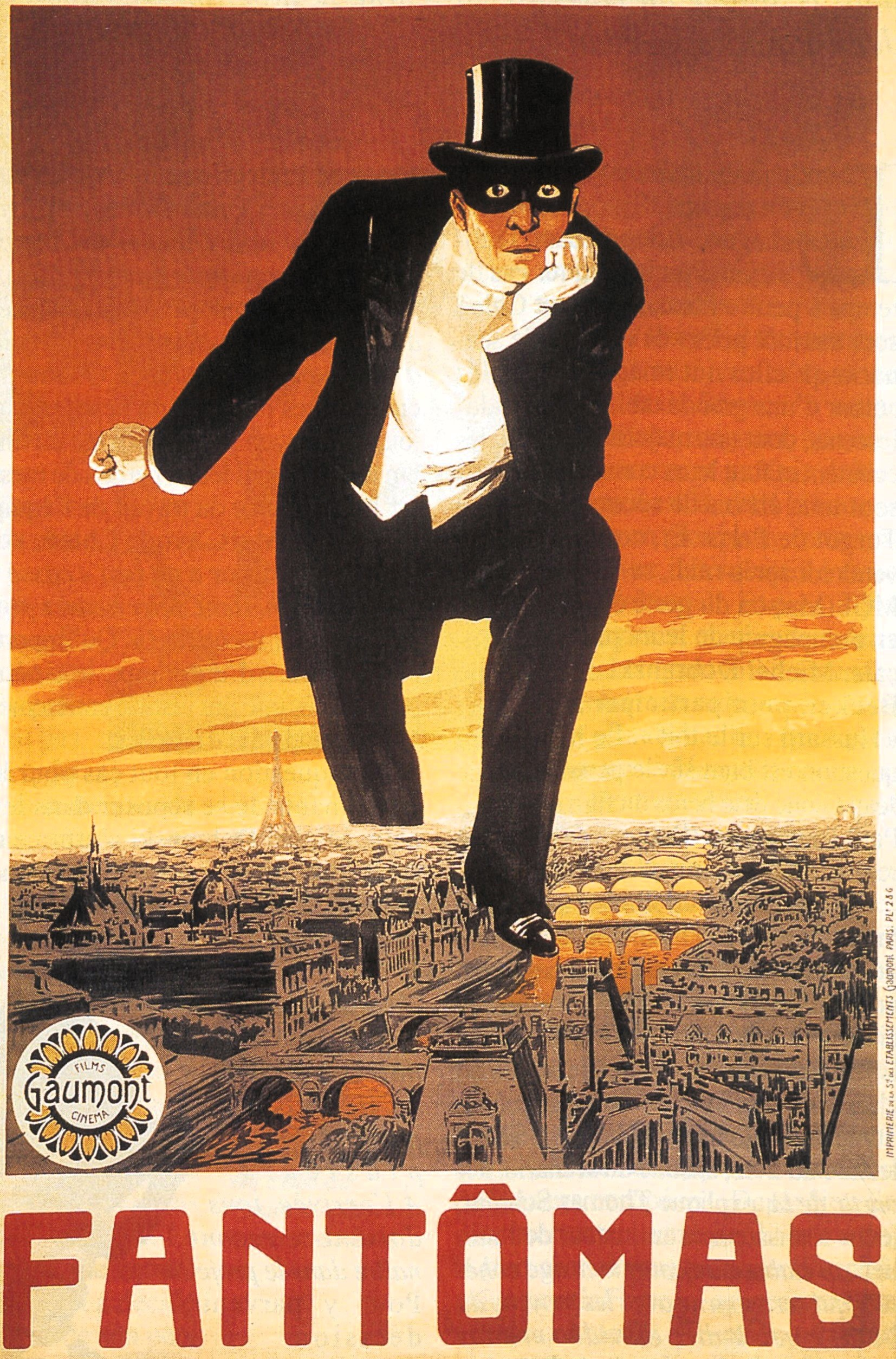
The original Lord Lister was a German avatar of the French Arsène Lupin and Fantomas characters and of the English A.J. Raffles as well.

=== Sci-fi novels ===
- Les Gadgets de l'Apocalypse (1978)
- Les Tueurs de l'Ordre (1980)
- Tuez les Tous (1980)

=== Non-fiction studies ===
- Introduction to the Belgian re-edition (in French language) of the "Lord Lister, genannt Raffles, der Meisterdieb" German pulp magazine, introducing the fictional character Raffles (also known as Lord Lister) - Claude Lefrancq Editeur Brussels 1995 (Vol.I) 1996 (Vol.II)

=== Holmesian novels ===
- Le Requin de la Tamise Lefrancq coll. En Poche, Paris 1997
- le Tueur dans le Fog
- Le Secret de l'Ile au Chien
- Les Meurtres du Titanic Lefrancq coll. En Poche, Paris 1998
- L'otage de Fraulein Doktor
- Sherlock Holmes et les Fantômes anthology (Fleuve noir 1999)

=== Anthologies ===
- Sherlock Holmes revient : an anthology of six German anonymous short stories (translated into French) originally published between 1907 and 1911. Introduction authored by editor/translator. (1996, éditions Fleuve Noir, collection Super Poche n° 27)

== See also ==
- A. J. Raffles vs. the contemporary German Lord Lister
