= Claude Laverdure =

Claude Laverdure may refer to:

- Claude Laverdure (author)
- Claude Laverdure (diplomat)
