= Santé Environnement France =

French environment and health NGO

Association Santé Environnement France
- Founders: Drs Pierre Souvet and Patrice Halimi
- Headquarters: Aix-en-Provence, France
- Services: Informing general public on health and environmental matters
- Members: 2 500 volunteer doctors
- Website: www.asef-asso.fr

Santé Environnement France (ASEF) is a non-governmental health and environmental organization founded in 2008 by two French doctors, Patrice Halimi and Pierre Souvet. It currently brings together more than 2 500 health professionals and has been recognized as a public interest organization.

Its core aim is based on informing general public on health and environmental matters. It works on several critical topics: air quality, climate change, biodiversity, electromagnetic waves, nutrition, gardening, sport, etc. According to the ASEF website, the organization conducts studies, organizes conferences, publishes practical guides and posts current news on health and environment.

== History ==
ASEF was formally established in 2008 in response to the emergence of chronic diseases linked to environment degradation. Drs Patrice Halimi and Pierre Souvet, founding members of the association, explained in a program on French national radio France Culture their commitment to raise public awareness about the impact of environment-related pollution on human health. Thus, they expressed their willingness to create the Association Santé Environnement France to carry out this project.

The organization has two employees and more than 2 500 volunteer doctors. The two founding members are still involved in the association. Dr Pierre Souvet, President, is a cardiologist in clinics near Marseille. In 2008, he was elected « Doctor of the year ». Dr Patrice Halimi, Secretary General, is a pediatric surgeon in Aix-en-Provence.

== Actions ==
The association focuses on 10 priority areas: childhood, homes, nutrition, cosmetics, gardening, air pollution, mobile phones, fitness, planet and emerging health issues.

=== Childhood ===
ASEF conducts public information campaigns about the impact of environmental exposures on child development. In 2009, the French newspaper Le Monde published the results of a study conducted by ASEF on air quality in French nurseries. It found "benzene and formaldehyde levels well above the established permitted level". The same year, another study on the pollutants emitted by baby's cots was published on News Santé website.

=== Homes ===
The association also speaks about the exposure to indoor air pollution. "Our Homes contain more than 900 chemical substances in which we spend almost 12 hours per day", states Dr Pierre Souvet, President of the association, in an interview in Bio addict magazine.

=== Nutrition ===
ASEF has been active in a large number of food and nutrition surveys. In 2013, a study on young children's feeding practices was published on the French newspaper Le Parisien. The results showed that "87% of the children do not recognize a beetroot. One third of them could not identify a leek, a courgette or even an artichoke".

=== Cosmetics ===
The organization focuses part of its work on beauty and well-being. Based on scientific summaries, ASEF intends to alert on cosmetic products that could be harmful to health. In March 2016, a press release announced the edition of a practical guide on the pollutants contained in cosmetics.

=== Gardening ===
ASEF supports simple actions aimed at preserving biodiversity, and increasing public awareness on the effects of pesticides on human health and environment. Dr Patrice Halimi, Secretary General of the association, said in an interview "Access to information is crucial. Consumers should know about the toxicity of these substances".

=== Outdoor air ===
The association addresses concerns regarding outdoor air quality. In 2015, a study based on air quality was published on the newsletter Le Parisien. This study was conducted in three French cities: Paris, Grenoble and Aix-en-Provence.

=== Mobile phone ===
In Mai 2011, the World Health Organization categorized low-frequency fields as "possibly carcinogenic". Despite the controversy, ASEF provides advice to limit exposure to electromagnetic waves. It has promoted information campaigns to raise awareness about the dangers of excessif mobile phone usage.

=== Fitness ===
ASEF is concerned about well-being issues. In 2013, it announced the introduction of a "Sport Santé" charter.

=== Planet ===
The COP 21 took place in Paris, from 30 November to 11 December. Its purpose was to find a global agreement on the reduction of greenhouse gas emissions. During the summit, the association reminded general public of the impact of global warming on health and the need to find solutions to this scourge.

=== Emerging issues ===
The association is involved in preserving marine ecosystems. In 2015, ASEF participated in a photography exhibition of everyday objects staged under the water. Ludivine Ferrer, Director of the association, explains in an interview for the French magazine FémininBio: "The purpose of this project is to draw attention to pollutants present in our everyday life".

== Funding ==
The association's principal source of financing is sponsorship. ASEF has three main sponsors: Leroy Merlin, Rainett and Generali. ASEF is also financed by donations from members.
