= Fantômas: The New World =

Upcoming French thriller film

- Teaser poster
- French: Fantômas: Le nouveau monde
- Directed by: Frédéric Tellier
- Screenplay by: Dan Franck; Olivier Gorce; David Oelhoffen; Frédéric Tellier
- Based on: Fantômas by: Marcel Allain; Pierre Souvestre
- Produced by: Pierre-Louis Arnal; Wassim Béji; Thierry Desmichelle; Rémi Jimenez
- Starring: Guillaume Canet; Romain Duris; Ana Girardot; Louis Peres
- Cinematography: Glynn Speeckaert
- Edited by: Célia Lafitedupont
- Music by: Guillaume Roussel
- Production companies: SND Films; WY Productions
- Distributed by: SND Films
- Release date: 3 February 2027
- Country: France
- Language: French

Fantômas: The New World (French: Fantômas: Le nouveau monde) is an upcoming French period thriller film adapted from the Fantômas stories by Marcel Allain and Pierre Souvestre. The film was directed by Frédéric Tellier, who co-wrote with Dan Franck, Olivier Gorce, and David Oelhoffen. It features Guillaume Canet as Fantômas, with Romain Duris, Ana Girardot, and Louis Peres also starring. The film is set to be released on 3 February 2027.

== Plot ==
Set in Paris in 1914, the plot follows Inspector Juve as he investigates a series of brutal crimes committed by an enigmatic master criminal known as Fantômas.

== Cast ==
- Guillaume Canet as Fantômas
- Romain Duris as Juve
- Ana Girardot as Hélène Gurn
- Louis Peres as Fandor
- Daphné Patakia
- Jean-Louis Garçon as Abel Fauconnier

== Production ==
A new film adaptation of Fantômas was first mooted in 2003, with José Garcia and Jean Reno set to star. In 2009, Christophe Gans and Thomas Langmann were announced as director and producer, respectively. By 2010, Vincent Cassel had replaced Garcia in the title role. The film ultimately went unproduced.

In August 2022, producer Wassim Béji and production company SND acquired the adaptation rights to Fantômas, and planned both a new film and a series, intended to return to the character's darker roots.

By late 2025, Frédéric Tellier had come onboard to direct, with the main cast announced as consisting of Guillaume Canet, Romain Duris, Lyna Khoudri and Louis Peres. The film will also include cinematography by Glynn Speeckaert, producer design by Florian Sanson, costumes by Olivier Bériot, artistic direction by Frédéric Cambon, and original music by Guillaume Roussel.

Filming had begun by 12 January 2026, by which time Khoudri had left the project and was replaced by Ana Girardot. The first poster was unveiled in July and also revealed that the title had become Fantômas: The New World.

== Release ==
Fantômas: The New World is set for release on 3 February 2027.
