= Everybody's Favorite Duck =

1988 novel by Gahan Wilson

Everybody's Favorite Duck is a 1988 parody of classic detective fiction and sensational crime stories. This short novel by cartoonist Gahan Wilson pits the detectives Enoch Bone and John Weston against the Professor, a British Napoleon of Crime; the Mandarin, a Chinese mastermind, and Spectrobert, a French rogue.

While few people read the Doctor Fu Manchu novels of Sax Rohmer at the beginning of the 21st century, his character has become iconic and is easily recognized in many of the traits of the Mandarin; while the Professor may be recognized as Professor Moriarty, the original Napoleon of Crime; and Spectrobert is clearly based on the sadistic, exhibitionist French arch-villain and master of disguise Fantômas.

Bone and Weston are modeled on Sherlock Holmes and Dr. Watson, Arthur Conan Doyle's archetypal crime solving team, although they may have more in common with the motion picture Holmes and Watson of the 1940s than the turn-of-the-century British, Baker Street originals. They may also owe something to Sax Rohmer's detectives and Rex Stout's Nero Wolfe and Archie Goodwin.

The plot has the three super-villains combining forces in a plot which baffles the police, the FBI and the CIA and even bemuses the two heroes.

The story comes to a head in a theme park, Waldo World (a clear spoof of Disneyland, but set in New Jersey), featuring the popular duck of the title (a parody of Donald Duck), and its creator, Art Waldo (Walt Disney).

The story has a surprise twist at the end, worthy of the most twisted of the plotters whose villainy drives the plot until the final scenes of the novel.
