= On Trial (1954 film) =

1954 French-Italian drama film directed by Julien Duvivier

- Directed by: Julien Duvivier
- Written by: Julien Duvivier
- Produced by: Franco London Films, Jolly Film
- Starring: Daniel Gélin, Eleonora Rossi Drago and Madeleine Robinson
- Cinematography: Robert Lefebvre
- Edited by: Marthe Poncin
- Music by: Pierre Larrieu; Georges Van Parys
- Color process: Black and white
- Production companies: Franco London Films; Jolly Film
- Distributed by: Gaumont Distribution
- Release date: 4 June 1954
- Running time: 110 minutes
- Countries: France; Italy
- Language: French

On Trial (French: L'Affaire Maurizius; Italian: Il caso Mauritius) is a 1954 Franco-Italian crime drama film directed by Julien Duvivier and starring Daniel Gélin, Madeleine Robinson and Anton Walbrook. It was based on a 1928 novel by Jakob Wassermann.

== Synopsis ==
Etzel, the son of the great prosecutor Andergast, wants to examine the file for the Maurizius case, eighteen years prior, in which the accused was condemned on the basis of suppositions. This case allowed his father's career to progress rapidly, but Etzel has some doubts.

== Cast ==
- Daniel Gélin : Léonard Maurizius
- Madeleine Robinson : Elisabeth Maurizius
- Anton Walbrook: Grégoire Waremme
- Charles Vanel : Wolf Andergast
- Eleonora Rossi Drago : Anna Jahn
- Bernard Musson : le greffier
- Jean d'Yd : le président
- Jacques Varennes : le juge d'instruction
- Claude Arlay
- Pierre Asso : Le maître-chanteur
- Paola Borboni : Mme Bobika
- Berthe Bovy : La grand-mère
- Jacques Chabassol : Etzel
- Denis d'Inès : M. Maurizius
- Jane Faber : La gouvernante
- Annie Fargue
- Jim Gérald : Le professeur
- Harry-Max : L'avocat
- Daniel Mendaille
- Pierre Palau : Le conseiller
- Joseph Palau-Fabre
- Sandro Ruffini
- Aldo Silvani
- Claude Sylvain : Mélita
