= Edward Lister (physician) =

English physician

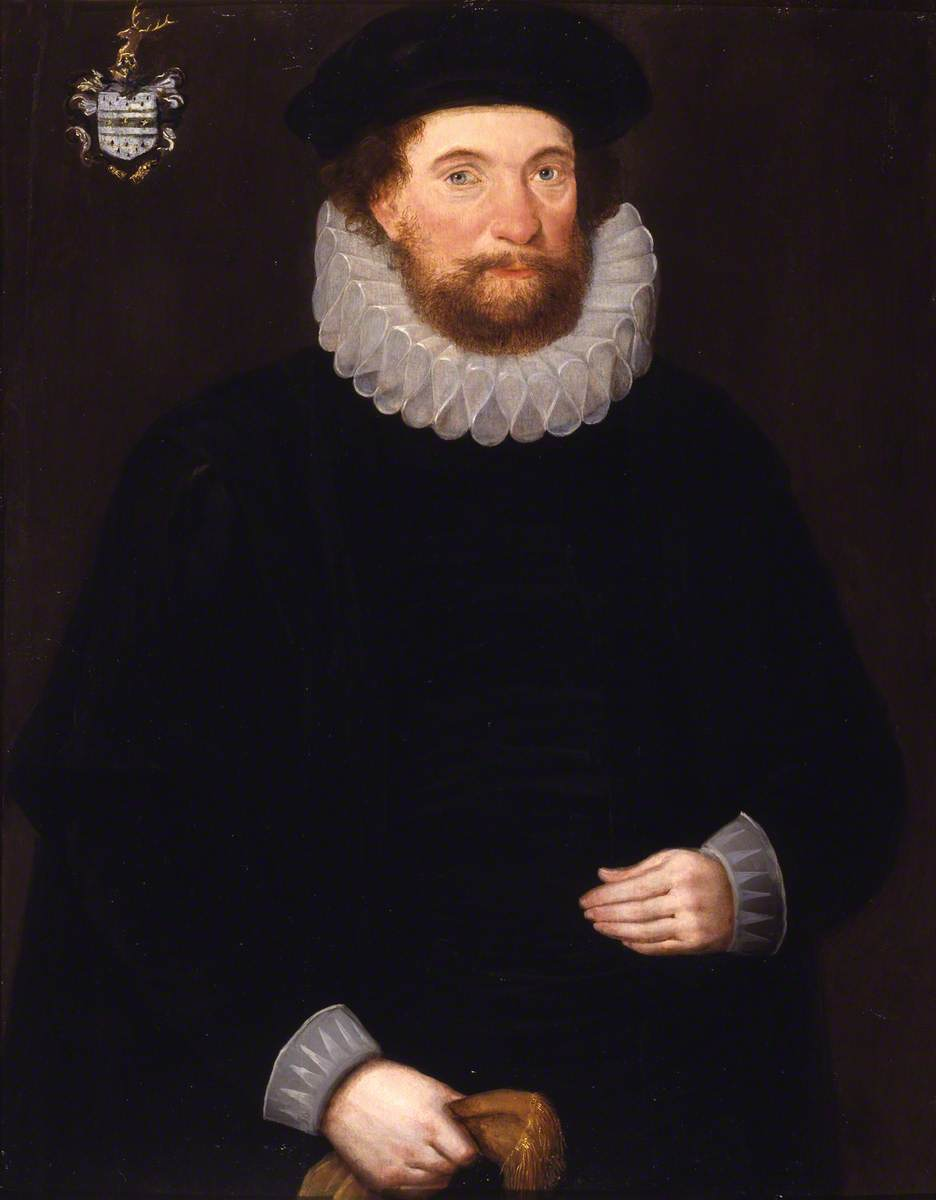
- Born: 1556; Wakefield, Yorkshire, England
- Died: 27 March 1620 (aged 63–64)
- Occupation: Physician

Edward Lister (1556 – 27 March 1620) was an English physician.

== Biography ==
Lister was the brother of Sir Matthew Lister. He was born in 1556 at Wakefield, Yorkshire, and educated at Eton College. In 1574 he was elected scholar of King's College, Cambridge, where he graduated with a B.A. in 1579, M.A. in 1583, and M.D. in 1590. He was elected a fellow of the Royal College of Physicians 30 September 1594, was six times chosen censor, and was treasurer from 1612 to 1618. He was physician in ordinary to Queen Elizabeth and to James I.

Lister lived in the parish of St. Mary-the-Virgin, Aldermanbury, London, and in the parish church, on 27 February 1593, married Ann, widow of his fellow-collegian, Dr. John Farmery. He died 27 March 1620, and was buried in the same church.
