= Tania Fédor =

French actress (1905–1985)

- Born: 3 November 1905; Monte Carlo, Monaco
- Died: 1 December 1985 (aged 80); Montreal, Quebec, Canada
- Other name: Tatiana d'Ermter
- Occupation: Actress
- Years active: 1926–1968
- Spouse: Ivan Mosjoukine (divorced)

Tania Fédor (3 November 1905 – 1 December 1985) was a French actress who played a number of leading roles during the 1930s and early 1940s in films such as Fantômas (1932). She later settled in Canada where she worked on French language productions.

== Selected filmography ==
- The Little Cafe (1931)
- Passport 13.444 (1931)
- When Love Is Over (1931)
- Fantômas (1932)
- Kiss Me (1932)
- La mille et deuxième nuit (1933)
- Little One (1935)
- The Queen and the Cardinal (1935)
- The Men Without Names (1937)
- Southern Bar (1938)
- Crossroads (1938)
- Strangers in the House (1942)
- The Newspaper Falls at Five O'Clock (1942)
- Lucrèce Borgia (1953)
- The Adventurer of Chad (1953)
- À tout prendre (1963)
- Rope Around the Neck (La corde au cou) - 1965

== Bibliography ==
- Hardy, Phil (ed.) The BFI Companion to Crime. University of California Press, 1997.
- Kennedy-Karpat, Colleen. Rogues, Romance, and Exoticism in French Cinema of the 1930s. Fairleigh Dickinson, 2013.
