= Dan Franck =

French novelist and screenwriter

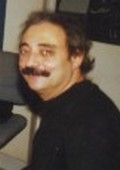
Dan Franck

Dan Franck (born 17 October 1952 in Paris) is a French novelist and screenwriter.

His novel La Séparation won the 1991 Prix Renaudot, and was made into a movie, La Séparation.

== Works ==
- Apolline, Seuil, 1997, ISBN 978-2-02-030745-1
- Bohèmes Calmann-Lévy, 2000, ISBN 978-2-266-09202-9
  - Bohemian Paris: Picasso, Modigliani, Matisse, and the Birth of Modern Art. Translated by Cynthia Liebow. Grove Press. 2003. ISBN 978-0-8021-3997-9.
- Boro s'en va t'en guerre (avec Jean Vautrin) Fayard, 2000, ISBN 978-2-213-60745-0
- La dame de Berlin, (avec Jean Vautrin), France Loisirs, 1987, ISBN 978-2-7242-3980-5
  - La Dama de Berlín: las aventuras de Boro, reportero gráfico, Translator María José Furió, Planeta, 1992, ISBN 978-84-322-4027-0
- La Dame du soir, Seuil, 1995, ISBN 978-2-02-024007-9
- La Séparation, Éd. Corps 16, 1991, ISBN 978-2-02-013525-2
  - Separation, A.A. Knopf, 1994, ISBN 978-0-679-42453-6; Vintage, 1995, ISBN 978-0-679-75444-2
- Le Cimetière des fous, Flammarion, 1989, ISBN 978-2-08-066394-8
- Le Petit Livre de l'Orchestre et de ses instruments, Mazarine, 1981, ISBN 978-2-86374-071-2
- Le Petit Livre des instruments de musique, Éd. du Seuil, 1993, ISBN 978-2-02-019555-3
- Le Temps des Cerises (avec Jean Vautrin) Casterman, 2011, ISBN 978-2-203-01770-2
- Les Adieux, Flammarion, 1987, ISBN 978-2-08-064992-8
- Les calendes grecques: roman, Seuil, 2000, ISBN 978-2-02-038107-9, Prix du premier roman
- Les Enfants, Librairie générale française, 2005, ISBN 978-2-253-11266-2
- Les Noces de Guernica (avec Jean Vautrin), Pocket, 2004, ISBN 978-2-266-14559-6
- Libertad!, Grasset, 2004, ISBN 978-2-246-61341-1
  - Libertad! L'amore e l'impegno, l'arte e la politica, i drammi e la leggerezza nella Parigi degli anni Trenta, Translator A. Tadini Perazzoli, Garzanti Libri, 2007, ISBN 978-88-11-68073-4
- Mademoiselle Chat: Les aventures de Boro, reporter photographe(avec Jean Vautrin) Pocket, 2007, ISBN 978-2-266-15517-5
- Nu couché, Seuil, 1998, ISBN 978-2-02-023720-8
- Picasso, Le carnet de la Californie: Dessins Cercle d'art, 1999, ISBN 978-2-7022-0516-7
- Tabac: récit, Seuil, 1995, ISBN 978-2-02-022804-6
- Un siècle d'amour (avec Enki Bilal) Casterman, 2009, ISBN 978-2-203-00546-4
- Une jeune fille, ISBN 978-0-679-44624-8
- Zidane : Le roman d'une victoire (avec Zinedine Zidane)
- Cher Boro (avec Jean Vautrin) Fayard, 2005, ISBN 978-2-213-62212-5
- La fëte à Boro (avec Jean Vautrin), éd. Grasset & Fasquelle, 2007, ISBN 978-2-213-62208-8)
- Roman nègre, éd. Grasset & Fasquelle, 2008, ISBN 978-2-246-73021-7
- La Dame de Jérusalem (avec Jean Vautrin), éd. Grasset & Fasquelle, 2009, ISBN 978-2-213-62209-5
- Minuit, éd. Grasset & Fasquelle, 2010, ISBN 978-2-246-61351-0
  - My Russian Love, Translator Jon Rothschild, Doubleday Publishing, 1997, ISBN 978-0-385-48488-6

== Screenplays ==
- Résistance (2014)
- Marseille (2016)
- Fantômas: The New World (2027)

== Reviews ==
- Christopher Hirst (18 January 2003). "The Bohemians, by Dan Franck". The Independent.
