= La Séparation =

La Separation
- Film poster
- Directed by: Christian Vincent
- Written by: Dan Franck; Christian Vincent
- Produced by: Claude Berri
- Starring: Isabelle Huppert; Daniel Auteuil
- Cinematography: Denis Lenoir; Anne Nicolet; Virginie Saint-Martin
- Edited by: François Ceppi; Véronique Ilié; Laurence Vanier
- Distributed by: AMLF
- Release date: 9 November 1994
- Running time: 88 minutes
- Country: France
- Language: French
- Budget: $5.6 million
- Box office: $3.7 million

La Séparation (transl. The separation) is a 1994 French romantic drama film directed by Christian Vincent and based on the novel La Séparation by Dan Franck.

== Plot ==
When a Parisian couple, Pierre and Anne, go to see a film, it bothers Pierre that Anne rejects his hand during the screening. Afterwards Anne tells Pierre that she 'thinks she has fallen in love with someone else'. Pierre hears the news without responding. Both seem determined to remain composed and deal with Anne's love interest and Pierre's hurt pride rationally.

Pierre discusses the situation with mutual friends but their reassurances are little comfort. Anne's new relationship make Pierre stressed. An added complication is their 18-month-old son. Despite the presence of a nanny, each find reason to claim the other is neglecting him. Paranoia and recrimination escalate. Fights break out, most bitterly after Pierre discovers that Anne has taken their son to her mother's house.

Pierre surprises Anne at work and asks to talk. He is more composed and tells her that he has decided he must leave. Anne reciprocates with the news that her affair has ended. Digesting this news with the same outward calm as at the beginning of the film, Pierre walks Anne back to their flat. He feels unable to go in. Instead he wanders the streets, uncertain what to do and unable to hail a stream of passing taxis.

== Cast ==
- Isabelle Huppert as Anne
- Daniel Auteuil as Pierre
- Jérôme Deschamps as Victor
- Karin Viard as Claire
- Laurence Lerel as Laurence
- Louis Vincent as Loulou
- Nina Morato as Marie

== Critical reception ==
The film received two César Award nominations for Best Actor (Daniel Auteuil) and Best Actress (Isabelle Huppert) in 1995 (the year of its UK release). The film took four years to find a distributor in the United States but following its release in 1998 it was nominated for a 1999 Golden Satellite Award as Best Foreign Language Film.

== See also ==
- Isabelle Huppert on screen and stage
