= Human Rights Publishers =

- Founded: 2004
- Country of origin: Russian Federation, Czech Republic
- Publication types: Books, Journals
- Official website: www.hrpublishers.org

Human Rights Publishers is an international publishing group, founded in 2004 by three organizations: Human Rights Publishers, Prague; Izdatelstvo Prava Cheloveka, Moscow; and Izhevsk-based NGO «Redaktsiya zhurnala Pravozaschitnik» (Human Rights Defender journal).

== Recent Publications ==
- Ivan Tolstoy. Doctor Zhivago: New Facts and Discoveries from the Nobel Archive (Prague: 2010)
- Vera Vasilyeva. No Witnesses? Nevzlin Case: Eyewitness Accounts of the Extramural Trial (Prague: 2009)
- Vera Vasilyeva. The Third Trial of Alexei Pichugin. "Yukos Case" Chronicles (Prague: 2007)
- Vera Vasilyeva. How Alexei Pichugin was judged: Court reportage (Prague: 2007)
- Andrey Shary. A Prayer for Serbia. The Secret of Zoran Djindjic’s Death (Prague: 2005)
- Andrey Shary. The Tribunal. Chronicles Of The Unfinished War (Moscow: 2003)

== See also ==
- Human rights in Russia
- Moscow Helsinki Group
- International human rights instruments
- List of human rights organisations
