= Passport 13.444 =

1931 film

- Directed by: Léon Mathot
- Written by: Léon Mathot
- Produced by: Joseph N. Ermolieff
- Starring: Léon Mathot; Tania Fédor; René Ferté
- Cinematography: René Gaveau
- Production company: Gaumont-Franco Film-Aubert
- Distributed by: Gaumont-Franco Film-Aubert
- Release date: 9 July 1931
- Running time: 92 minutes
- Country: France
- Language: French

Passport 13.444 (French: Passeport 13.444) is a 1931 French adventure film directed by Léon Mathot and starring Mathot, Tania Fédor and René Ferté. It was produced and distributed by Gaumont.

== Synopsis ==
At the border of a European country, André de Bussac meet a young woman he begs him for assistance. He agrees to pass her off as his wife, without realising that she is in fact a member of a revolutionary group planning an operation.

== Cast ==
- Léon Mathot as André de Bussac
- Tania Fédor as Nadia
- Malleville as Madame de Bussac
- Jean-Marie de l'Isle as Le baron Herman
- René Ferté as Serge Belinski
- Mag Landry as Anouchia
- Henri Kerny as François
- Blanche Denège

== Bibliography ==
- Bessy, Maurice; Chirat, Raymond (1986). Histoire du cinéma français: 1929-1934 (in French). Pygmalion. p. 207. ISBN 978-2-85704-274-7.
- Crisp, Colin. Genre, Myth and Convention in the French Cinema, 1929-1939. Indiana University Press, 2002.
- Rège, Philippe. Encyclopedia of French Film Directors, Volume 1. Scarecrow Press, 2009.
