= Andrey Shary =

Russian journalist (born 1965)

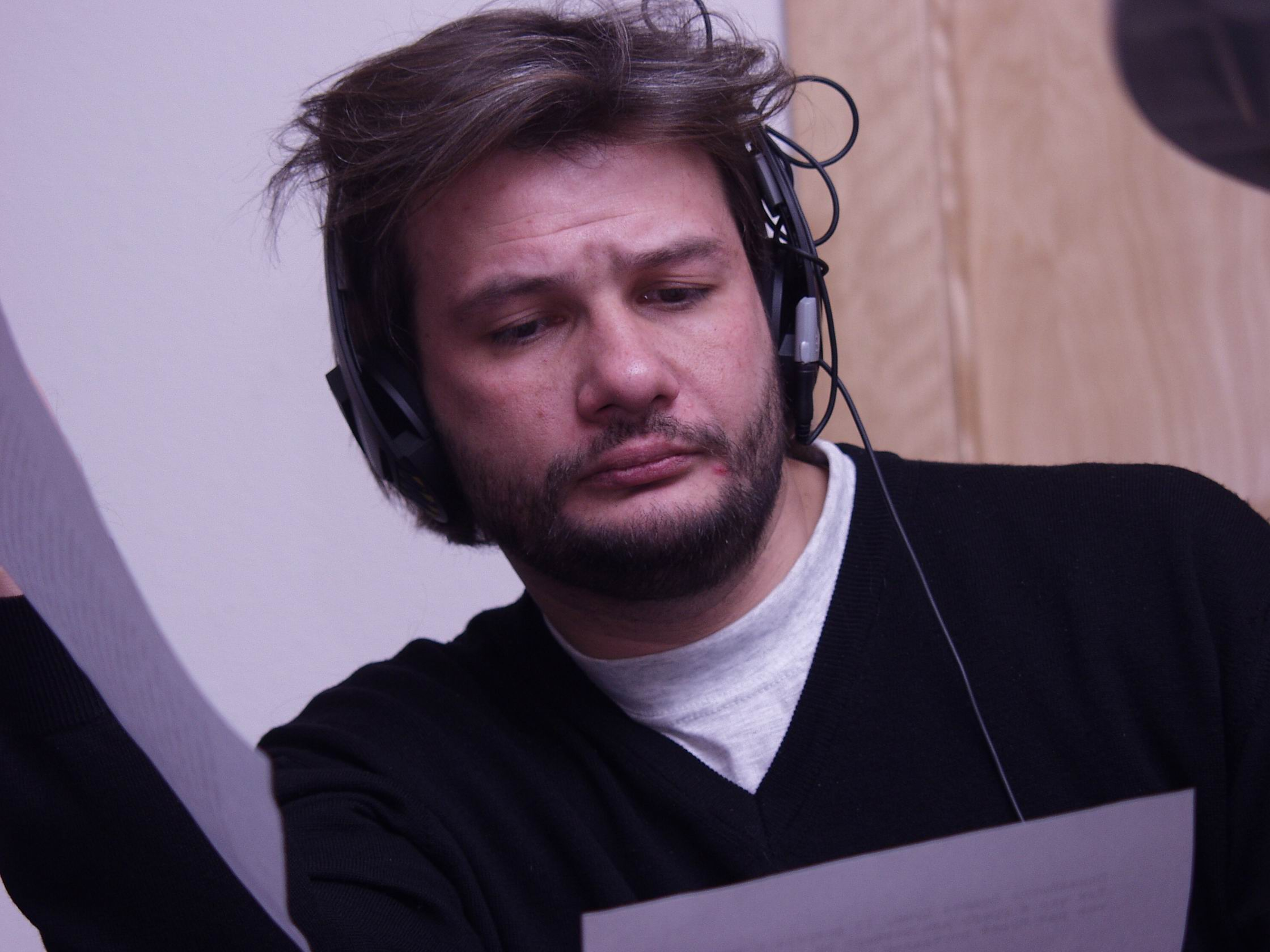
- Born: 17 June 1965 (age 61); Belogorsk, RSFSR
- Occupations: Writer, journalist
- Writing career
- Genre: Non-fiction
- Notable works: Sign 007. James Bond in Books and on the Screen; Austria-Hungary. A Destiny of an Empire; Danube. An Imperial River; Balkans. Borderlines of the Empires; Bohemian Times. Big History of a Small Country

Andrey Shary (Russian: Андре́й Ша́рый; born June 17, 1965) is a Russian journalist, historical author and media manager.

== Biography ==
He studied journalism at the Moscow State Institute of International Relations, graduating in 1987.

Shary worked for the Soviet daily Pravda in 1987–1990, then moving to the weekly Rossiya (1990–1994). Since 1992 he collaborates with Radio Free Europe / Radio Liberty. In 1994-1996 he worked as a field-reporter and commentator in former Yugoslavia, based in Zagreb.

Since 1996 he is a senior broadcaster, since 2016 Director for Radio Free Europe / Radio Liberty's Russian Service and an author of 15 books on the Yugoslav wars, history of Balkans, Central Europe, modern popular culture, and travel journals. Shary has written numerous articles and commentaries. He lives in Prague.

== Books ==
- After the Rain Falls. Yugoslavian Myths: Between the Old and the New Age. NLO, Moscow, 2002, ISBN 5-86793-180-3
- The Tribunal. Chronicles Of The Unfinished War. Human Rights Publishers, 2003, ISBN 5-7712-0279-7
- A Prayer for Serbia. The Secret of Zoran Djindjic’s Death. Human Rights Publishers, 2004, ISBN 80-903523-1-6 Co-author: Aja Kuge.
- Four Seasons. NLO, Moscow, 2006, ISBN 5-86793-394-6
- Sign 007: On Her Majesty’s Secret Service. NLO, Moscow, 2007, ISBN 5-86793-495-0 Co-author: Natalya Golitsyna.
- Sign F: Fantomas in Books and on the Screen. NLO, Moscow, 2007, ISBN 5-86793-517-5
- Sign W: Leader of the Red Skins in Books and on the Screen. NLO, Moscow, 2008, ISBN 978-5-86793-562-7
- Sign Z: Zorro in Books and on the Screen. NLO, Moscow, 2008, ISBN 978-5-86793-626-6
- Sign D: Dracula in Books and on the Screen. NLO, Moscow, 2009, ISBN 978-5-86793-711-9 Co-author: Vladimir Vedrashko.
- Sign 007: James Bond in Books and on the Screen. NLO, Moscow, 2010, ISBN 978-5-86793-761-4 Co-author: Natalya Golitsyna.
- The Roots and the Crown. Essays on Austria-Hungary: A Destiny of an Empire. KoLibri, Moscow, 2011, ISBN 978-5-389-01371-1 Co-author: Yaroslav Shimov.
- Austria-Hungary. A Destiny of an Empire. KoLibri, Moscow, 2015, ISBN 978-5-389-09313-3 Co-author: Yaroslav Shimov. 2nd edition.
- The Globe of Saint Petersburg. NLO, Moscow, 2011, ISBN 978-5-86793-909-0
- The Globe of Moscow. NLO, Moscow. 2013, ISBN 978-5-4448-0043-0 Co-author: Olga Podkolzina.
- Danube. An Imperial River. KoLibri, Moscow, 2015, ISBN 978-5-389-09312-6
- Dunărea. Fluviul imperrilor. Polirom, Iași, 2017 ISBN 978-973-46-6363-7
- Коріння та корона. Нариси про Австро-Угорщину: доля імперії. Dipa, Kyiv, 2018 ISBN 978-617-7606-07-8
- Balkans. Borderlines of the Empires. KoLibri, Moscow, 2018, ISBN 978-5-389-15148-2
- Дунай: ріка iмперій. Dipa, Kyiv, 2021 ISBN 978-617-7606-58-0
- Bohemian Times. Big History of a Small Country: from Saint Wenceslas to Vaclav Havel. Photos by Olga Bazhenova. KoLibri, Moscow, 2022, ISBN 978-5-389-19978-1
- For Nation and Order! Central Europe and Balkans between WWI and WWII. The Historical Expertise, Chișinău, 2025, ISBN 978-3-68959-007-9 Co-author: Yaroslav Shimov
