= Gabriel Auguste Ferdinand Ducuing =

French Navy officer

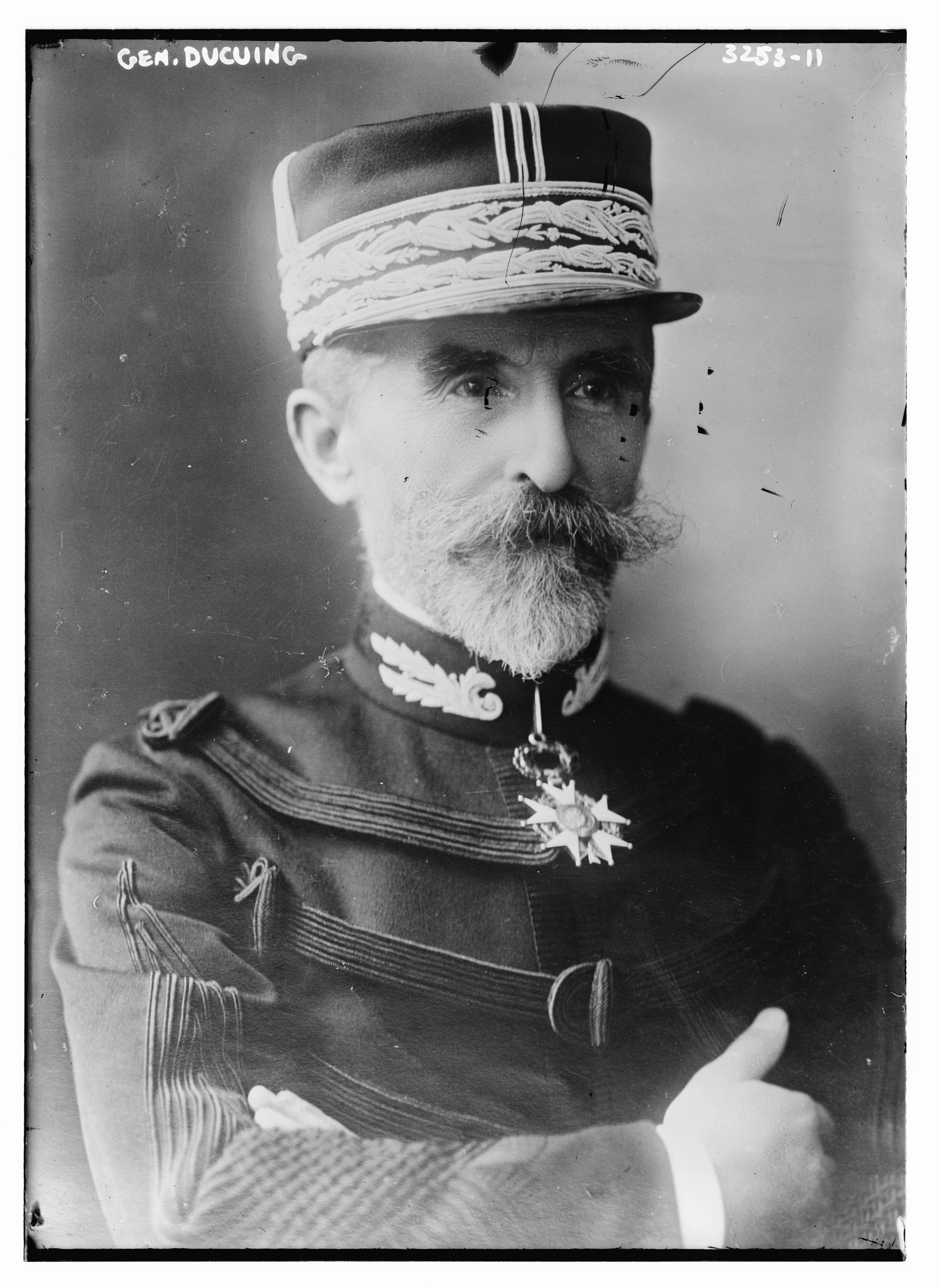
- Born: 22 December 1885; Paris, France
- Died: 25 May 1940 (aged 54); Cap Gris Nez, France
- Military career
- Allegiance: French Third Republic
- Branch: Navy / Naval Reserve
- Service years: 1907 and 1914–1940
- Rank: Capitaine de frégate (posthumous promotion)
- Conflicts: First World War: Western Front; Italian Front (WIA); Second World War: Battle of France; Battle of Cap Gris-Nez †
- Awards: Légion d’honneur (knight, 1917; officer, 1928); Italian knighthood (1915)

Commandant Gabriel Auguste Ferdinand Ducuing (22 December 1885 – 25 May 1940) was an officer in the French Navy of the First and Second World Wars.

== Life ==
=== Early life ===
He was the son of a second cousin of Ferdinand Foch. Aiming for the merchant marine, he embarked in 1904 as "pilotin" on the three-masted "Cérès". Called to carry out his military service in 1907, he served on board the battleships "Brennus" and "Bouvet". On returning to the merchant fleet, he was promoted lieutenant in the course of 1908 and captain in the course of 1911. He sailed successively on several steamships, all the while taking the time to learn four foreign languages and to study for a law degree.

=== First World War ===
At the outbreak of war in July 1914 he was the second captain of a steamship, but he soon decided to leave the merchant navy to join the infantry chasseurs to defend his country. Named sous lieutenant in December, he could not bear the static life of the trenches and moved to the nascent French Air Force, first as an observer-corps officer, then (briefly in July 1915) as a pilot. In July 1915 he returned to the Navy with a commission, captaining an auxiliary vessel. Assigned to maritime aviation at Dunkerque then at Venice (Italy), he immediately became noted for his brilliant qualities as a trainer. After carrying out many observation and bombing missions, he was injured in battle, mentioned in despatches by the French and Italian navies and knighted by the king of Italy. Promoted enseigne de vaisseau de 1ère classe in the reserve in July 1916, he was moved to train fighter pilots at Pau, where an accident rendered him unfit to pilot a plane himself. Made a knight of the Légion d’honneur in January 1917 at only 32 years old, he was again stationed at Dunkerque as second in command of its center of maritime aviation. However, finding this post insufficiently "combattant", he had himself made a balloon observer on and, on 1 October, took command of the centre at Le Havre, where he remained up until July 1918. Promoted lieutenant de vaisseau in the reserve, he was then put on attachment (because of his long training as captain) as liaison officer to the under secretary of state to the merchant navy until his demobilization in April 1919.

=== Inter-war ===
At the end of the war he did not rejoin the merchant-fleet, instead becoming a ship owner. Marked by the conflict, he remained a particularly active officer in the naval reserve. On 9 July 1925, replying to the call of the general delegate of the National Union of the Officers of the Reserve (Union Nationale des Officiers de Réserve), he combined with some friends to form (within the UNOR) the 5th commission made up of the sailors' vows at the congress of Belfort. This later became the general assembly component of the ACORAM (Central Association of the Officers of Reserve of the Army, or Association Centrale des Officiers de Réserve de l’Armée de Mer), of which Ducuing was naturally elected president, and which still remained close to UNOR.

On the president's suggestion, Ducuing, the French Navy in June 1927 created training centres for reserve officers, that will become accessible to naval NCOs from 1931. In April 1928, Ducuing's eminent services to the state saw him promoted to be an officer of the légion d’honneur. In liaison with the Union of Fighting Sailors (Union des Marins Combattants, UMC) of Paris, he worked for the creation, on 23 February 1930, of the Federation of the Associations of Old Fighting Sailors (Fédération des Associations de Marins Anciens Combattants, FAMAC) that would become the FAMMAC. Equally down to him is the creation of the Central Association of the Non-Commissioned Officers of the Naval Reserve (Association Centrale des Officiers Mariniers de Réserve de l’Armée de Mer, or ACOMAR). At his request, in 1931 the Navy created courses for improving the instruction of non-commissioned officers in the naval reserve. Promoted capitaine de corvette in April 1932, he reached the normal retirement age in 1934 but at his own request remained in the reserves and postponed retirement until December 1942, when he would be 57.

=== Second World War ===
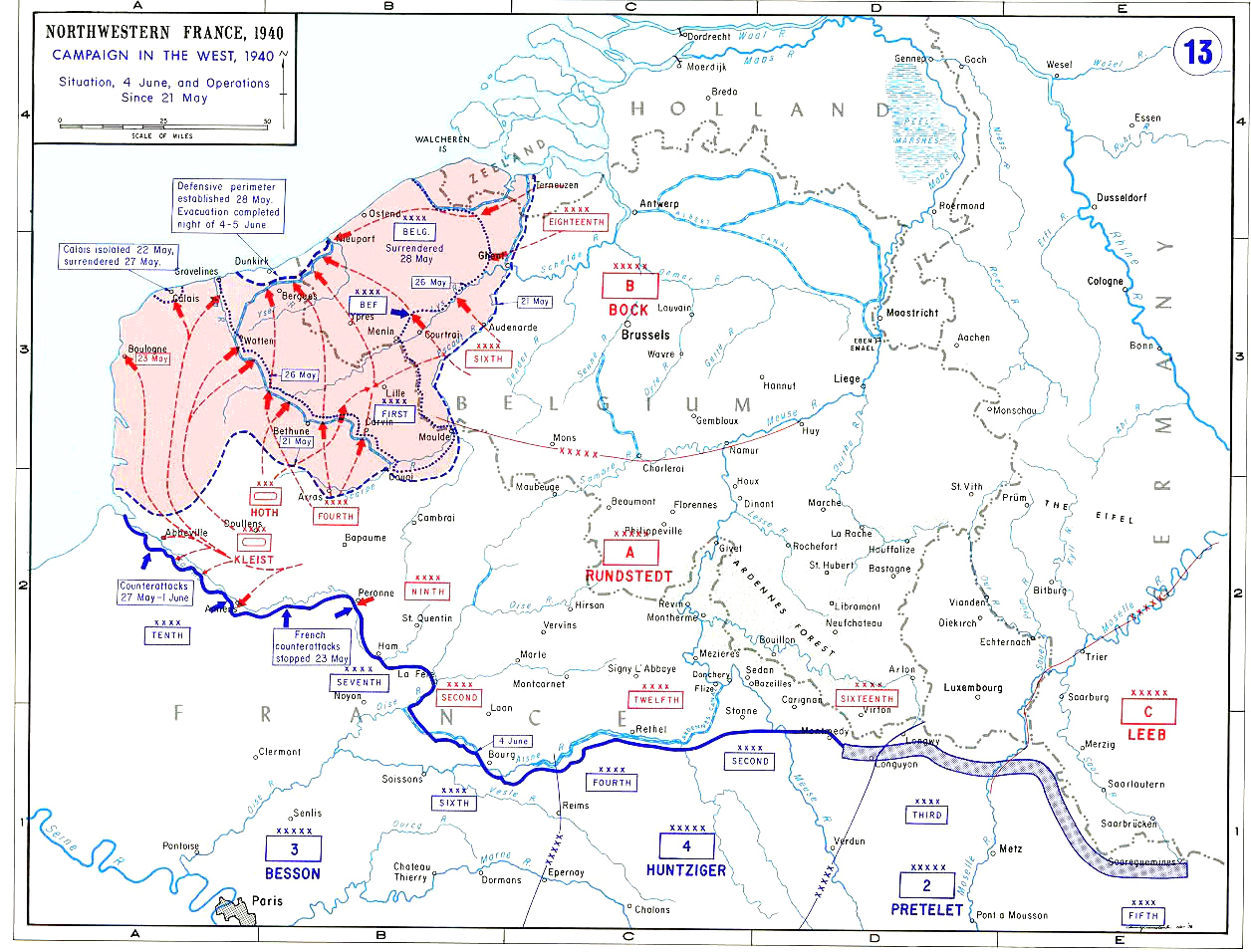
German advance from front on 21 May (blue dotted line) to 4 June 1940

In September 1939, Ducuing took command of the battery of D.C.A. (défense contre aéronefs, or anti-aircraft group) of the Croix Faron at Toulon. At the end of January 1940, the French Admiralty was anxious to observe and maintain free passage along the Pas-de-Calais coast, and so set up a coastal battery at Cap Gris-Nez. Ducuing was charged with commanding and organizing this battery from March 1940. He had 3 officers and around 100 men under him, with only twenty rifles and six revolvers between them. On 22 May, facing the German offensive as it closed in on him, with the weak means at his disposal he organized an advanced position of 24 men of which he took personal command. When practically encircled, commandant Ducuing and his men completely destroyed a German column made up of a small number of side-cars, a light tank and two armored cars. In the evening, he refused a surrender proposed to him by the Germans. In the night of 23 to 24 May the French destroyer Chacal was crippled by German bombs and grounded nearby, with some of the wounded sailors joining Ducuing's group.

During the night of 24 to 25 May, he organized the evacuation by sea of the sailors by dredger. On 25 May 1940, at 9am, the German armour under Guderian were no more than 200 metres from Ducuing's post on Cap Gris-Nez. Having run out of munitions, commandant Ducuing destroyed the artillery and machine guns and gave the order to his men to withdraw. Remaining at his post alone, he went to the mast of the base, hoisted the French colors and was killed by a short burst of automatic weapon fire.

== Honours ==
- 1915 – Italian knighthood
- January 1917 – knight of the Légion d’honneur
- April 1928 – officer of the Légion d’honneur
- May/June 1940 – Posthumously made capitaine de frégate on (with the navy especially waiving its rule forbidding all posthumous promotions for him), and a brilliant citation in the ordre de l’armée.
- In May 1952, the secretary of state to the navy inaugurated a stela at Cap Gris-Nez in memory of him and the fallen sailors under his command.
- The D'Estienne d'Orves-class aviso Commandant Ducuing is named after him.
