= Claude Laverdure (author) =

Belgian comics artist (1947–2020)

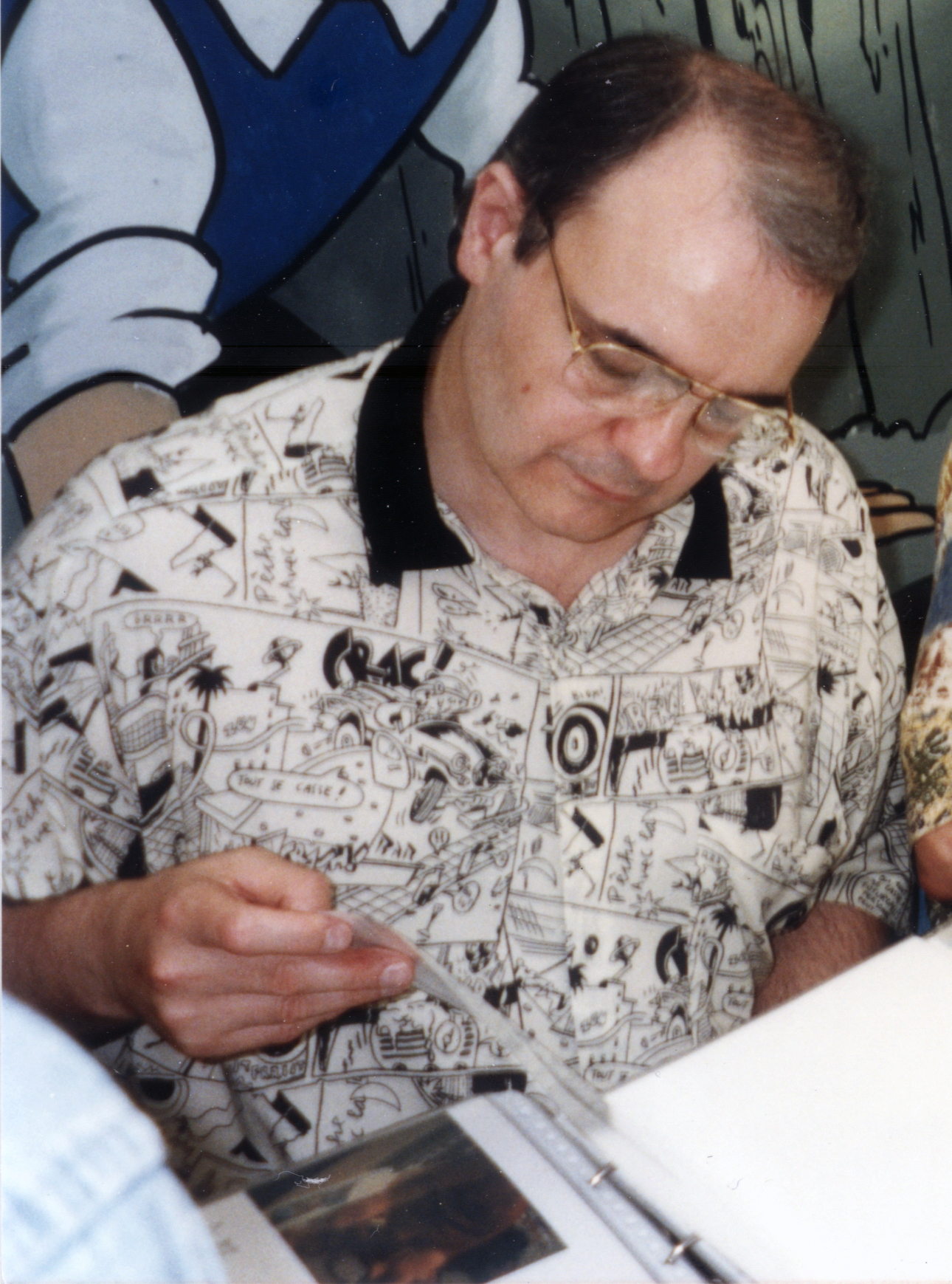
- Born: 19 April 1947; Belgian Congo
- Died: 17 August 2020 (aged 73); Namur, Belgium
- Occupation: Comic book author

Claude Laverdure (19 April 1947 – 17 August 2020) was a Belgian comic book author.

== Biography ==
Laverdure had lived in Namur since his childhood. From 1960 to 1964, he studied screen printing and advertising. He began working as a designer in an enamel shop in 1965, then worked as a graphic designer and page maker at Éditions Wesmael-Charlier from 1967 to 1973. He was noticed by comic book author Édouard Aidans, writer of Tounga and Les Panthères, among others.

Starting in 1979, Laverdure produced sets, inking and lettering the first four albums of the French version of Tony Stark. In doing so, he met Christian Lamquet, with whom he produced a series celebrating the 150th anniversary of Belgium's independence, titled 150 Ans d'avatars de la Province de Namur. The work won an international prize in Paris. It was reissued in 1997 with additional panels.

In 1982, Laverdure designed Aventures du baron Prosit in the magazine Spirou, which did not appear until several years later. In 1987, Dargaud began publishing his series Chroniques de l'impossible, scripted by Christian Piscaglia. In 1988, he published Fantômas for Luc Dellisse and scripted Claude Lefrancq. From 1993, he published Journey to the Center of the Earth, written by Jules Verne.

In 2002, he illustrated a memoir of Antoine de Saint-Exupéry written by Philippe Domard and published by Le Lombard. This would be his final comic book published. In 2005, he began working on the recolorization of Voyage au Center de la Terre. It was published the following year with cover art by René Follet. In February 2020, a retrospective exhibition was displayed at Galerie Aarnor in Spy.

Claude Laverdure died on 17 August 2020 at the age of 73.

== Works ==
- Tony Stark : Le prisonnier du ciel (1980)
- Tony Stark : Le lion d'un million (1980)
- Tony Stark : Les voleurs de nuages (1981)
- 150 ans d'avatars de la province de Namur (1981)
- Le syndrome des sorciers : La mémoire albinos (1986)
- Chroniques de l'impossible : La maison Bruges (1987)
- Chroniques de l'impossible : Les tempêtes de Saint-Malo (1988)
- Chroniques de l'impossible : La longue nuit de Strasbourg (1990)
- Fantômas : L'affaire Beltham (1990)
- Fantômas : Juve contre Fantômas (1991)
- Fantômas : Le mort qui tue (1995)
- Voyage au centre de la Terre (1993–1997)
- Saint-Exupéry (2003)
- Voyage au centre de la terre (2006)
