= John Farmery (physician) =

English physician

John Farmery (born c. 1545 – died March 1590) was an English physician.

== Life ==
Farmery was a native of Lincolnshire, and matriculated as a pensioner of King's College, Cambridge, in November 1561 (B.A. 1564–5, M.A. 1568). He seems to have practised medicine in London as an empiric, with powerful patrons.

The Royal College of Physicians was induced to license him on 4 Feb. 1586–7, and admitted him a candidate 22 February following, and fellow 28 February 1588–9, with an injunction to proceed M.D. within two years. In September 1589, he graduated M.D. at Leyden, after receiving letters testimonial from the London college. In 1589, he was directed by the college to draw up, with Drs. Atslowe, Browne, and Present, formulas for syrups, juleps, and decoctions, for the 'Pharmacopœia.'

He died in the spring of 1590. In his will (P. C. C. 23, Drury), dated 15 March and proved 7 April 1590, he described himself as living in 'Alderbert strete' in the parish of St. Mary Aldermanbury, and desired to be buried in his parish church. By his wife, Anne, he had two daughters, Mary and Elizabeth. His widow afterwards married (license dated 26 February 1592–3) Edward Lister, M.D. (d. 1620), and was buried in the church of St. Mary Aldermanbury, 11 Dec. 1613. Farmery was a Roman Catholic. His friend Richard Smith, M.D., was 'supraveisor' of his will.

== Works ==
He is conjectured (Cooper, Athenæ Cant. ii. 98) to have been the author of 'A Methode of Measuring and Surveying of Land; published by J. F., practitioner in physick,’ licensed to Thomas Woodcocke 13 Oct. 1589 (Arber, Registers, ii. 249).

A book, 'Perpetuall and kindelie pronosticacons of the change of tymes, taken out of old and new aucthors,’ 'to be printed in Italian, Frenche, and Englishe,’ and licensed to John Wolfe 7 Jan. 1590–1 (ib. ii. 269 b), has also been attributed to Farmery. Joseph Ames (Typographical Antiquities) ed. William Herbert, p. 1177) wrongly describes the latter work as 'Perpetuall Prognostication of the—Weather—by I. F.'

It is doubtful if Farmery was concerned with it.
