= Raffles (character) =

Character in pulp fiction

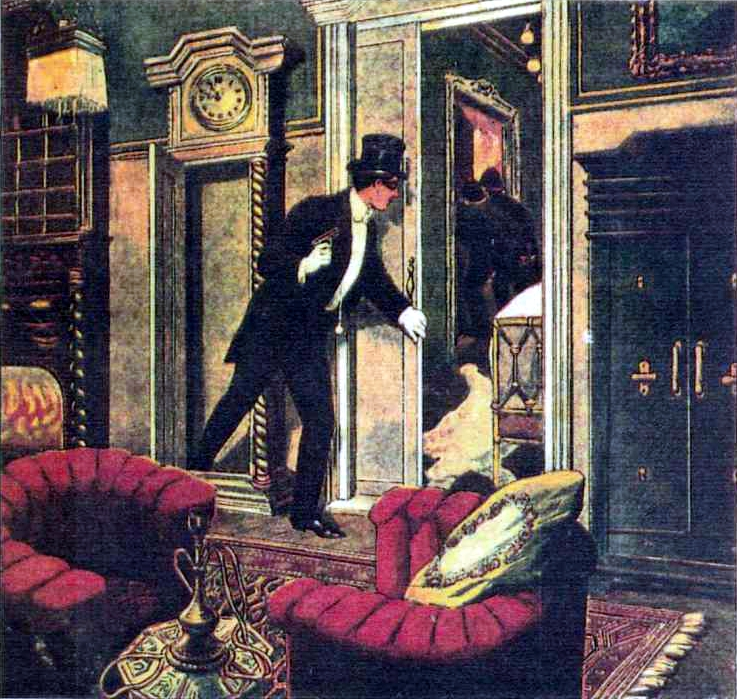
Lord Lister in action, ca 1908.

Raffles (also known as Lord Lister) is a fictional character who first appeared in a German pulp magazine entitled "Lord Lister, genannt Raffles, der Meisterdieb" ("Lord Lister, called Raffles, the master thief") published in 1908, written by Kurt Matull and Theo Blakensee. The series was continued after a few issues as "Lord Lister, genannt Raffles, der große Unbekannte" ("...Known as Raffles, the Great Unknown"), which was the title of the first novel. The series became very popular and was translated, as well as continued in a number of countries and achieved such a popularity that Raffles was used in an Italian series as an opponent for Nick Carter, as Carter's European equivalent, a context in which he has been described as Europe's greatest pulp hero. Unlike Nick Carter, Lord Lister was never thoroughly updated. The Dutch series was the last surviving one, ending in 1968. The first English translation of The Great Unknown was published in February 2015.

== Countries in which Raffles was published ==
=== Germany ===
In Germany, the original series published by Verlag Gustav Müller & Co in Berlin, trying to cash in on the popularity of A. J. Raffles with a similar character, ran for 110 weekly issues and ended with the marriage of Lord Lister in 1910. Issues were still sold into the first years of the First World War. The series was republished, incompletely, during the interbellum period (1919–1939).

=== Denmark ===
Denmark produced more than 144 Lord Lister stories.

=== France ===
In France, the real name of Lord Lister was changed to John C. Sinclair. Copyright reasons involving A. J. Raffles have been used as an explanation for the change. For unknown reasons, this version seems to be considered the "authentic" version to Wold Newton Universe researchers, rather than the original German or the longest lasting Dutch version.

=== Malaysia ===
Cheritera Kechurian Lima Million Ringgit ("The Story of the Theft of Five Million Ringgit"), written by Muhammad bin Muhammad Said, is considered the first Malaysian detective novel and features as foil for Nick Carter the famous heroic English thief John C. Sinclair (see France section, above), as well as his arch enemy Baxter.

=== Netherlands ===
Publication of the original German series in a biweekly Dutch translation started in 1910. The original series was followed by 16 issues (or 15, the Lord Listerklub lists #119 as "never seen yet") by an unknown author, in which many of the stories were situated in the Netherlands. From June 14, 1923, the first issue, "De Onbekende", appeared as a feuilleton (soap opera) in the newspaper Rotterdamsch Nieuwsblad. Starting with #127, the stories were written by Felix Hageman as an uncredited author. Starting with #514, more or less updated and renamed reprints of Dutch and German stories appeared in the series, mixed with new stories. The last new stories were published in the early 1930s.

In 1938, a certain P. Sonnega wrote rather positively about Raffles in an article titled "Die Detectiveroman" ("That Detective Novel") appearing in De Groene Amsterdammer of 15 January 1938, in which he, after making clear that one could be both an intellectual and a Lord Lister fan, described Raffles as a fascinating figure in evening costume wearing a cape with a red silk lining. This infuriated Felix Hageman and, after having kept his identity as Lord Lister author a secret for almost a quarter of a century, as he was not very proud about this part of his penmanship, he made his identity public in a reaction to De Groene Amsterdammer to strengthen his claim that Lord Lister would never wear a cape with a red lining, but would as a gentleman always wear a cape with a white silk lining. Nevertheless, in 1940, the Dutch poet-journalist-critic Halbo C. Kool published his own story "Lord Lister en de toverspiegel" ("Lord Lister and the Magic Mirror").

The Second World War meant a publication stop for the series. Publication was resumed in 1946. In 1954, the publication of different versions for Flanders and the Netherlands was started. The differences between the national versions was however limited to the price (different currencies) and the number of the issue (Belgium started with #3000, while the Dutch series had that issue as #2228). A similar jump in numbers to indicate a new series had been made after the war as well, when over 600 issue numbers were skipped to start the new series with #2001.

The last Lord Lister, "Het Kostbare Parelsnoer", appeared at the end of 1967 as #3687 in Belgium and in January 1968 as #2915 in the Netherlands.

=== Belgium ===
A Belgian re-edition in French language has been published by Claude Lefrancq Editeur (Brussels) in 1995 (Vol.I) and 1996 (Vol.II), with editor Yves Varende authoring an erudite introduction and foreword about the topic.

=== Spain ===
The Spanish edition, "Lord Lister conocido por Raffles el Rey de los Ladrones" was published by Editorial Atlante, Barcelona, in 1910, and ran for 68 issues. A new series, "Nuevas Proeza de John C. Raffles" was published by Ediciones Marco, circa 1930, and ran for at least 31 issues.

=== Argentina ===
Publisher Editorial Atlante, Barcelona, sold an abridged version of its 1910 Spanish translations in Argentina, reprinting the original covers with a white border and starting with Spanish issue No. 4 "El Tesoro en un sarcófago" ("The Treasure in the Coffin") renumbered as No. 1 by placing a printed sticker over the original number.

== The character Lord Lister ==
Raffles was a Victorian era gentleman thief and a born member of nobility. The first issue of the original German series reveals that the notorious thief John C. Raffles is really Lord Edward Lister.

A number of different, somewhat conflicting origin stories exist to explain why a genuine Lord would become a thief, involving having been robbed from his inheritance, poverty in childhood, boredom or overindulgence in charity. With his secret identity exposed Raffles is forced to create and maintain a large number of false ones, of which the main one is Lord William Aberdeen. Depending on the origin story this title could be genuine, the name and identity are false.

The character, though originally a sort of a hero villain, grew more and more into a heroic character, a thief, certainly, but a thief like Robin Hood, embodiment of the ideals of the nobility, protecting the weak, punishing and reforming the bad guys (by theft), supporting the poor and often curing the ill. Raffles is a medical doctor, a chemist, an engineer and an inventor. That combination results in his most remarkable ability: Raffles can by means of his medical/chemical knowledge change the colour and texture of his hair and his skin and the colour of his eyes. He used this ability almost exclusively for his own disguises, combined with more conventional disguise tricks. As a result of this his true age is always somewhat unclear. As a very handsome and muscular man he cannot disguise himself as a female person convincingly, unlike his companions, be it that Henderson seems always a remarkably tall and muscular lady. Raffles cannot be hypnotised by normal means, but can hypnotise people himself. Raffles speaks quite some languages, including Dutch, French, Russian and Hungarian. Considering less exceptional abilities, they can be simply summarized by stating that, but for eating with chopsticks, Raffles can do everything.

For a Victorian gentleman, Lord Lister is refreshingly free from racist views. A World War I-induced dislike towards Germans is present in Hageman's version of the character. Scenes in which topless ladies occur are sometimes noticeable, but those scenes are rather free from erotic implications, as they tend to involve Raffles as a doctor or a detective discovering something clearly of great importance. As such the series was seen as one of the better pulps, not unfit for children.

His arch-enemy is the rather incompetent inspector Baxter (Scotland Yard), whose more competent assistant is an admirer of Raffles.

Sidekicks to Raffles are the giant James Henderson, his driver and servant, and Charles Brand, his secretary, financial manager and friend. Henderson is very strong, he lifts 800 kilograms (1,800 lb) with ease and a good hand-to-hand fighter. Charles Brand, however, is the best shot and the fastest runner of the three, as well as the only one who can disguise himself convincingly as a girl or a woman. Relations between the three are warm, but Lord Lister is the master.

In the first story, "Der grosse Unbekannte" ("The Great Unknown") Sherlock Holmes has sent a letter to his foil Scotland Yard's Captain Baxter declining aiding in capturing Raffles, since he finds it amusing that the police can't capture him.
