= Marcel Allain =

French writer (1885–1969)

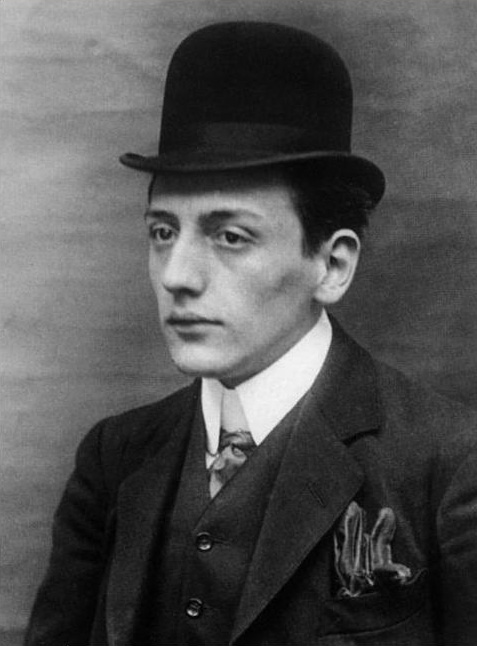
- Born: Marcel Allain; 15 September 1885
- Died: 25 August 1969 (aged 83)

Marcel Allain (French pronunciation: [maʁsɛl alɛ̃]; 15 September 1885 – 25 August 1969) was a French writer mostly remembered today for his co-creation with Pierre Souvestre of the fictional arch-villain and master criminal Fantômas.

== Career ==
The son of a bourgeois family, Allain studied law before becoming a journalist. He then became the assistant of Souvestre, who was already a well-known figure in literary circles. In 1909, the two men published their first novel, Le Rour. Investigating Magistrate Germain Fuselier, later to become a recurring character in the Fantômas series, appears in the novel.

Then, in February 1911, Allain and Souvestre embarked upon the Fantômas book series at the request of publisher Arthème Fayard, who wanted to create a new monthly pulp magazine. The success was immediate and lasting.

After Souvestre’s death in February 1914, Allain continued the Fantômas saga alone, then launched several other series, such as Tigris, Fatala, Miss Téria and Férocias, but none garnered the same popularity as Fantômas. In total, Allain wrote more than 400 novels in his prolific career.

On 27 September 1926, Allain married Souvestre’s girl-friend, Henriette Kistler. She died in 1956.

== Other work by Allain and Souvestre ==
- Le Rour (1908)
- Le Four (1909)
- L'Empreinte (1910)
- La Royalda (1910)
- Naz-en-l’Air (1912-1913)
- Titi-le-Moblot (1913-1914)

== Bibliography of the Fantômas books ==
=== By Allain and Souvestre ===
1911

- 1. Fantômas (1911; transl. 1915; retransl. 1986)
- 2. Juve contre Fantômas (1911; transl. 1916; retransl. 1987)
- 3. Le Mort qui Tue (1911; transl. 1917)
- 4. L'Agent Secret (1911; transl. 1917)
- 5. Un Roi Prisonnier de Fantômas (1911; transl. 1919)
- 6. Le Policier Apache (1911; transl. 1924)
- 7. Le Pendu de Londres (1911; transl. 1920)
- 8. La Fille de Fantômas (1911; transl. 2006) (ISBN 1932983562)
- 9. Le Fiacre de Nuit (1911)
- 10. La Main Coupée (1911; transl. 1924)

1912

- 11. L'Arrestation de Fantômas (1912)
- 12. Le Magistrat Cambrioleur (1912)
- 13. La Livrée du Crime (1912)
- 14. La Mort de Juve (1912)
- 15. L'Evadée de Saint-Lazare (1912)
- 16. La Disparition de Fandor (1912)
- 17. Le Mariage de Fantômas (1912)
- 18. L'Assassin de Lady Beltham (1912)
- 19. La Guêpe Rouge (1912)
- 20. Les Souliers du Mort (1912)
- 21. Le Train Perdu (1912)
- 22. Les Amours d'un Prince (1912)
- 23. Le Bouquet Tragique (1912)

1913

- 24. Le Jockey Masqué (1913)
- 25. Le Cercueil Vide (1913)
- 26. Le Faiseur de Reines (1913)
- 27. Le Cadavre Géant (1913)
- 28. Le Voleur d'Or (1913)
- 29. La Série Rouge (1913)
- 30. L'Hôtel du Crime (1913)
- 31. La Cravate de Chanvre (1913)
- 32. La Fin de Fantômas (1913)

=== By Allain alone ===
- 33. Fantômas est-il ressuscité? (1925; transl. 1925)
- 34. Fantômas, Roi des Recéleurs (1926; transl. 1926)
- 35. Fantômas en Danger (1926; transl. 1926)
- 36. Fantômas prend sa Revanche (1926; transl. 1927)
- 37. Fantômas Attaque Fandor (1926; transl. 1928)
- 38. Si c'était Fantômas? (1933)
- 39. Oui, c'est Fantômas! (1934)
- 40. Fantômas Joue et Gagne (1935)
- 41. Fantômas Rencontre l'Amour (1946)
- 42. Fantômas Vole des Blondes (1948)
- 43. Fantômas Mène le Bal (1963)
