= Pierre Souvestre =

French lawyer, journalist, writer and organizer of motor races

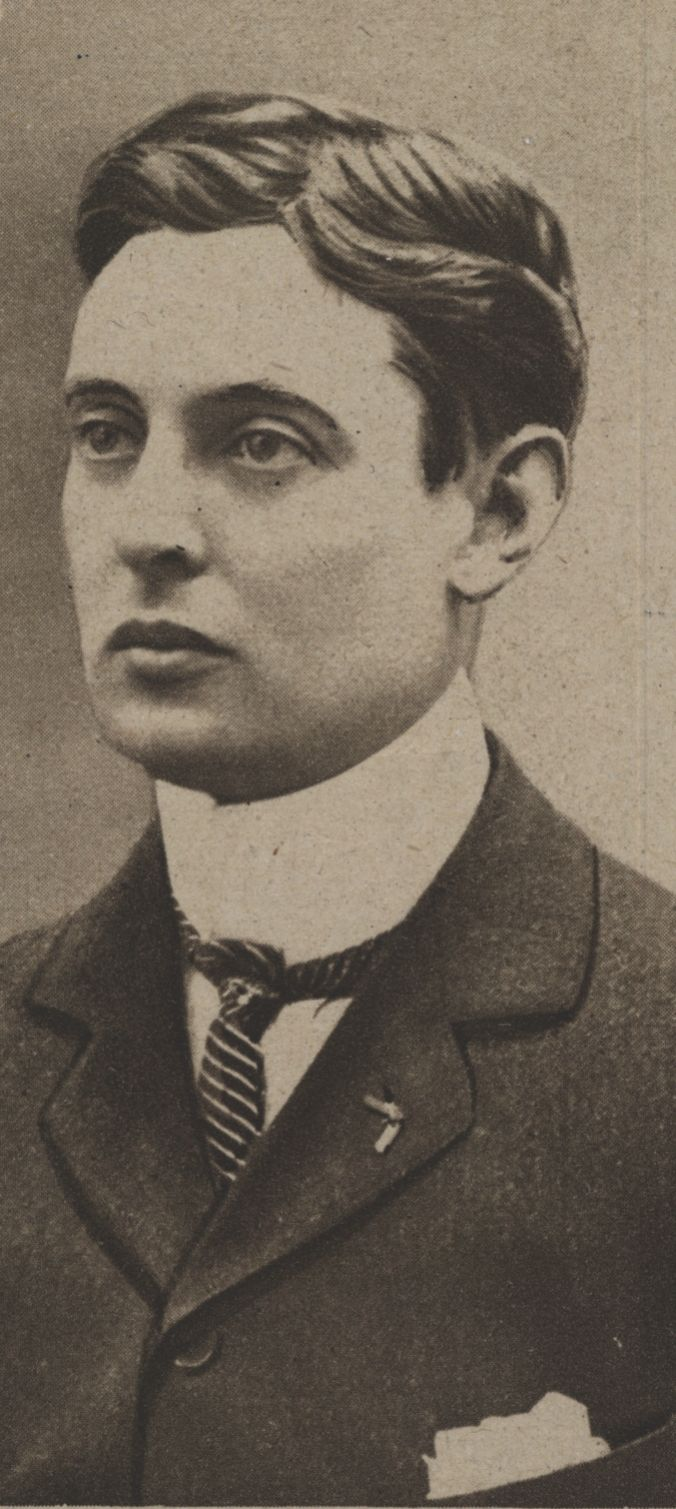
- by Henri Manuel, from Le Miroir (fr), 8 March 1914
- Born: 1 June 1874; Plomelin, Finistère, France
- Died: 26 February 1914 (aged 39)
- Occupations: Lawyer, journalist, writer, race organizer

Pierre Souvestre (French pronunciation: [pjɛʁ suvɛstʁ]; 1 June 1874 – 26 February 1914) was a French lawyer, journalist, writer and organizer of motor races. He is mostly remembered today for his co-creation with Marcel Allain of the fictional arch-villain and master criminal Fantômas.

== Early life ==
He was born in Plomelin, a commune in Finistère, Brittany, the son of a prefect of Brittany who resigned from his post to settle in Paris. Souvestre studied law at the Lycée Janson-de-Sailly.

== Career ==
He became a lawyer, then a journalist, and a businessman. He owned a garage in Liverpool from 1898, then a second in Paris from 1905. A delegate of the Automobile Club de France (fr), he organized motor races, contributed to the newspaper L'Auto (fr), and wrote technical books, including the 1907 book, History of the Automobile, and the French-English Automobile Dictionary in 1910.

In 1909, already a published author, Souvestre co-wrote, with his friend and assistant Allain, their first novel, Le Rour. Investigating Magistrate Germain Fuselier, later to become a recurring character in the Fantômas series, appears in this first novel.

In February 1911, Allain and Souvestre began the Fantômas book series at the request of Joseph-Arthème Fayard (fr), a publisher, who wanted to create a new monthly pulp magazine. Allain and Souvestre also jointly wrote the spy series Naz-en-l'air. After his death, Allain continued the Fantômas saga alone.

== Private life ==
Souvestre took in Marcel Allain when Allain was driven from his home by his father. Souvestre died of a congestion of the lungs. Souvestre's former girlfriend, Henriette Kistler, married Marcel Allain on 27 September 1926. Kistler died in 1956.

== Poetry ==
- Kidding (1894)

== Conte ==
- Collage (1894)
- The Misfortunes of Madame Rambuad (1896)

== Automobile publications ==
- Sporty silhouettes (1903)
- History of the Automobile (1907)
- The car, how to use it, its maintenance (1908)
- French-English Automobile Dictionary (1910)

== Other work by Allain and Souvestre ==
- Le Rour (1908-1909)
- Le Four (1909)
- L'Empreinte (1910)
- La Royalda (1910)
- Naz-en-l’Air (1912-1913)
- Titi-le-Moblot (1913-1914)

== The Fantômas books by Allain and Souvestre ==
1911

- 1. Fantômas (1911; transl. 1915; retransl. 1986)
- 2. Juve contre Fantômas (1911; transl. 1916; retransl. 1987)
- 3. Le Mort qui Tue (1911; transl. 1917)
- 4. L'Agent Secret (1911; transl. 1917)
- 5. Un Roi Prisonnier de Fantômas (1911; transl. 1919)
- 6. Le Policier Apache (1911; transl. 1924)
- 7. Le Pendu de Londres (1911; transl. 1920)
- 8. La Fille de Fantômas (1911; transl. 2006) (ISBN 1932983562)
- 9. Le Fiacre de Nuit (1911)
- 10. La Main Coupée (1911; transl. 1924)

1912

- 11. L'Arrestation de Fantômas (1912)
- 12. Le Magistrat Cambrioleur (1912)
- 13. La Livrée du Crime (1912)
- 14. La Mort de Juve (1912)
- 15. L'Evadée de Saint-Lazare (1912)
- 16. La Disparition de Fandor (1912)
- 17. Le Mariage de Fantômas (1912)
- 18. L'Assassin de Lady Beltham (1912)
- 19. La Guêpe Rouge (1912)
- 20. Les Souliers du Mort (1912)
- 21. Le Train Perdu (1912)
- 22. Les Amours d'un Prince (1912)
- 23. Le Bouquet Tragique (1912)

1913

- 24. Le Jockey Masqué (1913)
- 25. Le Cercueil Vide (1913)
- 26. Le Faiseur de Reines (1913)
- 27. Le Cadavre Géant (1913)
- 28. Le Voleur d'Or (1913)
- 29. La Série Rouge (1913)
- 30. L'Hôtel du Crime (1913)
- 31. La Cravate de Chanvre (1913)
- 32. La Fin de Fantômas (1913)

== The Naz-en-l'air books by Allain and Souvestre ==
1912

- Naz-en-l'air (1912)
- Le Secret de Naz-en-l'air (1912)
- L'Ongle cassé (1912)
- Les Tueuses d'hommes (1912)

1913

- Le Mystérieux Clubman (1913)
- Le Roi des flics (1913)
- Évadé de bagne (1913)
- Espions de l'air (1913)
- Crimes d'empereur (1913)
- Haine de bandit (1913)
- L'Échéance fatale (1913)

== Theater works by Allain and Souvestre ==
- Gigolo, drama in five acts, Paris, Schaub-Barbré (1913), with Marcel Allain
- Naz-en-l'air, drama in five acts, Paris, Schaub-Barbré (1913), with Marcel Allain
