= Tsilla Chelton =

French actress (1919–2012)

- Born: Tsilla Schilton; 21 June 1919; Jerusalem, British Mandate of Palestine
- Died: 15 July 2012 (aged 93); Brussels, Belgium
- Occupation: Actress

Tsilla Chelton (21 June 1919 – 15 July 2012) was a French actress of theatre and film, famous for playing the main role in 1990 film Tatie Danielle, in which she was nominated for a César Awards and as an elderly Dominican in Sister Smile.

== Biography ==
Tsilla Schilton was born in Jerusalem but spent her childhood in Belgium. The daughter of French parents of Jewish heritage, she lost her mother at the age of 6, and followed her father to Antwerp. She moved to Switzerland during World War II before settling in Paris. Married to decorator Jacques Noël, she had 4 children.

Attracted by theatre, she started acting in Marcel Marceau's troupe.

Her career was mainly in theatre, where she acted in the eleven works of Eugène Ionesco, earning a Molière Award for best comedian in Ionesco's The Chairs. She premiered the plays of Bertold Brecht in France, with Michel Serrault, Michel Piccoli and Laurent Terzieff.

On the big screen, she became famous at 71 for her work in the 1990 Étienne Chatiliez film Tatie Danielle, where she played the title role as a hateful and cantankerous old lady. She gave acting classes from 1964 onwards and was the teacher of the actors of the Splendid troupe, including Gérard Jugnot, Michel Blanc, and Thierry Lhermitte.

== Death ==
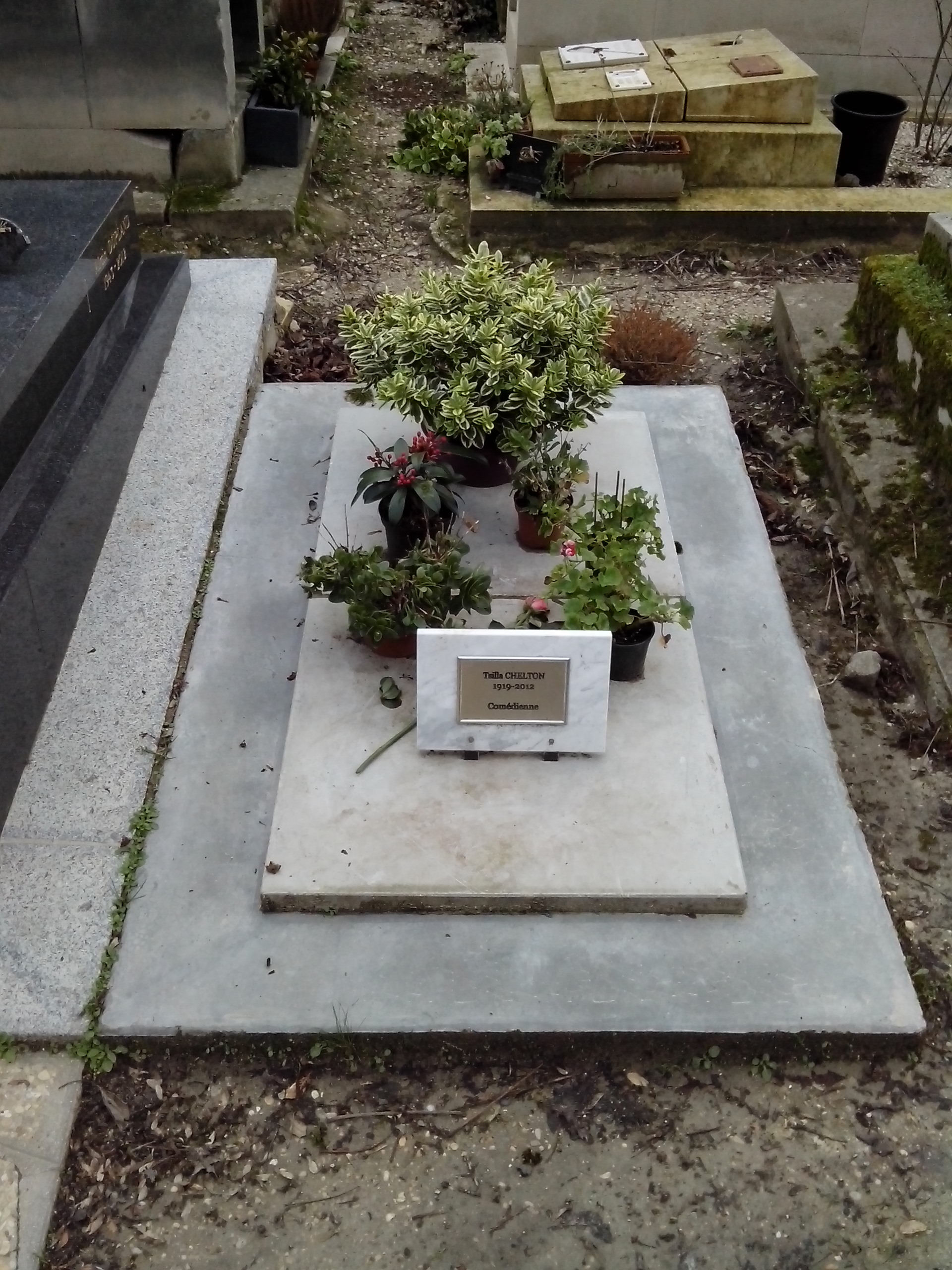
Chelton's tombstone at Père Lachaise cemetery, Paris.

Chelton died at 93 in Brussels, Belgium.

Her ashes were buried in the Père Lachaise Cemetery, Paris.

== Theatre ==
- 1952 : The underground lovers by Jean Tardieu, directed by Sylvain Dhomme, Théâtre Lancry
- 1952 : The Chairs by Eugène Ionesco, directed by Sylvain Dhomme, Théâtre Lancry
- 1953 : Victimes du devoir by Eugène Ionesco, directed by Jacques Mauclair, Théâtre du Quartier latin, Théâtre des Célestins
- 1953 : La Femme du condamné by Henri Monnier, Théâtre des Célestins
- 1954 : Man Equals Man by Bertolt Brecht, directed by Jean-Marie Serreau, Théâtre des Célestins, Théâtre de l'Œuvre
- 1955 : Jacques ou la soumission by Eugène Ionesco, directed by Robert Postec, Théâtre de la Huchette
- 1955 : Le Tableau by Eugène Ionesco, directed by Robert Postec, Théâtre de la Huchette
- 1956 : L'Impromptu de l'Alma by Eugène Ionesco, directed by Maurice Jacquemont, Studio des Champs-Élysées
- 1956 : Les Chaises by Eugène Ionesco, directed by Jacques Mauclair, Studio des Champs-Élysées, Théâtre des Célestins
- 1957 : A Marriage Proposal by Anton Tchekhov, directed by Maurice Jacquemont, Théâtre de l'Ambigu
- 1957 : The House of Bernarda Alba by Federico García Lorca, directed by Maurice Jacquemont, Théâtre de l'Ambigu
- 1957 : Pericles, Prince of Tyre by William Shakespeare, directed by René Dupuy, Théâtre de l'Ambigu
- 1958 : Les Carabiniers by Beniamino Joppolo, directed by Michel de Ré, Théâtre d'Aujourd'hui
- 1960 : Victimes du devoir by Eugène Ionesco, directed by Jacques Mauclair, Aix-en-Provence
- 1960 : Les Chaises by Eugène Ionesco, directed by Jacques Mauclair, Studio des Champs-Élysées
- 1961 : Les Chaises by Eugène Ionesco, directed by Jacques Mauclair, Studio des Champs-Élysées
- 1961 : Les Nourrices by Romain Weingarten, directed by the author, Théâtre de Lutèce
- 1962 : Chemises de nuit by Eugène Ionesco, François Billetdoux and Jean Vauthier, directed by Antoine Bourseiller, Théâtre des Champs-Elysées
- 1962 : Délire à deux by Eugène Ionesco, directed by Antoine Bourseiller, Studio des Champs-Élysées
- 1962 : La Brigitta by Jacques Audiberti, directed by François Maistre, Théâtre de l'Athénée
- 1962 : Lulu by Frank Wedekind, directed by François Maistre, Théâtre de l'Athénée
- 1962 : Exit the King by Eugène Ionesco, directed by Jacques Mauclair, Théâtre de l'Alliance française
- 1963 : Exit the King by Eugène Ionesco, directed by Jacques Mauclair, Festival du Jeune Théâtre Liège
- 1963 : Les Salutations and Scène à quatre by Eugène Ionesco, directed by Jacques Mauclair, Festival du Jeune Théâtre Liège
- 1963 : Célimare le bien-aimé by Eugène Labiche and Alfred Delacour, directed by Jacques Mauclair, Théâtre de l'Alliance française
- 1964 : Richard III by Shakespeare, directed by Jean Anouilh and Roland Piétri, Théâtre Montparnasse
- 1965 : The Chairs by Eugène Ionesco, directed by Jacques Mauclair, Théâtre Gramont
- 1966 : Spectacle Beckett-Ionesco-Pinget including Délire à deux by Eugène Ionesco, directed by Jean-Louis Barrault, Odéon-Théâtre de France
- 1966 : Exit the King by Eugène Ionesco, directed by Jacques Mauclair, Théâtre de l'Athénée
- 1967 : The Chairs by Eugène Ionesco, directed by Jacques Mauclair, Théâtre Gramont
- 1968 : Exit the King by Eugène Ionesco, directed by Jacques Mauclair, Festival de la Cité Carcassonne Théâtre du Midi
- 1969 : Exit the King by Eugène Ionesco, directed by Jacques Mauclair, Festival de Bellac, Festivals d'été
- 1969 : The Chairs by Eugène Ionesco, directed by Jacques Mauclair, tournée
- 1969 : Au théâtre ce soir : Many d'Alfred Adam, directed by Pierre Dux, producer Pierre Sabbagh, Théâtre Marigny
- 1970 : Exit the King by Eugène Ionesco, directed by Jacques Mauclair, Théâtre de l'Athénée
- 1970 : Les Adieux de la Grande Duchesse by Bernard Da Costa, directed by Jacques Mauclair, Poche Montparnasse
- 1971 : Les Chaises by Eugène Ionesco, directed by Jacques Mauclair, Théâtre de l'Alliance française
- 1971 : La Lacune by Eugène Ionesco, directed by Jacques Mauclair, Théâtre de l'Alliance française
- 1971 : La Jeune Fille à marier by Eugène Ionesco, directed by Jacques Mauclair, Théâtre de l'Alliance française
- 1972 : Le Saut du lit by Ray Cooney and John Chapman, directed by Jean Le Poulain, Théâtre Montparnasse
- 1973 : Exit the King by Eugène Ionesco, directed by Jacques Mauclair, Festival d'Angers
- 1975 : Les Adieux de la Grande Duchesse by Bernard Da Costa, directed by Jacques Mauclair, Théâtre Rive Gauche
- 1975 : L'Homme aux valises by Eugène Ionesco, directed by Jacques Mauclair, Théâtre de l'Atelier
- 1976 : La Reine de la nuit by Christian Giudicelli, directed by Gérard Caillaud, Théâtre de Plaisance
- 1976 : The Chairs by Eugène Ionesco, directed by Jacques Mauclair, Théâtre des Célestins, Théâtre de Boulogne-Billancourt
- 1977 : Le Sexe faible by Édouard Bourdet, directed by Jean Meyer, Théâtre des Célestins
- 1978 : Les Plaideurs by Racine, directed by Jean Meyer, Théâtre des Célestins
- 1978 : The Chairs by Eugène Ionesco, directed by Jacques Mauclair, Théâtre du Marais
- 1978 : Au théâtre ce soir : Vous ne l'emporterez pas avec vous de Moss Hart and George Kaufman, directed by Jean-Luc Moreau, producer Pierre Sabbagh, Théâtre Marigny
- 1978 : Au théâtre ce soir : Brocéliande de Henry de Montherlant, directed by Jean Meyer, producer Pierre Sabbagh, Théâtre Marigny
- 1981 : Au théâtre ce soir : Mort ou vif de Max Régnier, directed by Christian Duroc, producer Pierre Sabbagh, Théâtre Marigny
- 1987 : Crucifixion dans un boudoir turc by Jean Gruault, directed by Guy Michel, Théâtre de l'Odéon
- 1987 : Reine mère by Mainlo Santinelli, directed by José Quaglio, Théâtre de Poche Montparnasse
- 1988 : Le Saut du lit by Ray Cooney and John Chapman, directed by Jean Le Poulain, Théâtre des Variétés
- 1991 : En conduisant Miss Daisy by Alfred Uhry, directed by Gérard Vergez, Théâtre Antoine
- 1993 : The Chairs by Eugène Ionesco, directed by Jacques Mauclair, Théâtre du Marais
- 1996 : Le Mal de mère by Pierre-Olivier Scotto, directed by Françoise Seigner, Théâtre de la Madeleine
- 1997 : Le Mal de mère by Pierre-Olivier Scotto, directed by Françoise Seigner, Théâtre des Célestins
- 1998 : Le Mal de mère by Pierre-Olivier Scotto, directed by Françoise Seigner, Théâtre du Palais-Royal
- 2000 : Le ciel est égoïste by Pierre-Olivier Scotto and Martine Feldmann, directed by Pierre Aufrey, Théâtre du Palais-Royal, Théâtre Montansier
- 2001 : Une femme de lettres and Un bi-choco sous le sofa by Alan Bennett, directed by Jean-Claude Idée, Théâtre Tristan-Bernard

== Filmography ==
Year	Title	Role	Director	Notes
1962	War of the Buttons		Yves Robert	
1963	Sweet and Sour		Jacques Baratier	
1963	Lektionen	Pianist		TV movie
1963	Bébert et l'omnibus	Traveler	Yves Robert (2)	
1965	Les copains	Inn manageress	Yves Robert (3)	
1965	La grosse caisse	Newspaper seller	Alex Joffé	
1965	La communale		Jean L'Hôte	
1966	Antony		Jean Kerchbron	TV movie
1968	Very Happy Alexander	Madame Bouillot	Yves Robert (4)	
1968	Les compagnons de Baal	Cosmochronos's worshiper	Pierre Prévert	TV Mini-Series (4 episodes)
1968	Mazel Tov ou le mariage		Claude Berri	
1969	Les Gauloises bleues	Director	Michel Cournot	
1969	Les enquêtes du commissaire Maigret	Madame Martin	René Lucot	TV series (1 episode)
1970	Le Distrait	Madame Cliston	Pierre Richard	
1970	The Wedding Ring	Madame Duvernet	Christian de Chalonge	
1971	Ten Days' Wonder	Théo's mother	Claude Chabrol	
1971	Shéhérazade	Magician	Pierre Badel	TV movie
1972	Le seize à Kerbriant	Blanche	Michel Wyn	TV series
1973	Le machin	Madame Ledieu	Armand Ridel	TV movie
1973	L'amour du métier	Mademoiselle Parent	Yves Laumet	TV series
1974	L'implantation	Aunt Eugénie	Guy Lefranc	TV movie
1974	Mort au jury	Madame Muss-Leduran	Jean Maley	TV series
1974	Shanks	Mrs. Barton	William Castle	
1975	C'est pas parce qu'on a rien à dire qu'il faut fermer sa gueule...	Madame Pipi	Jacques Besnard	
1975	Plus amer que la mort	Madame Dejean	Michel Wyn (2)	TV movie
1975	La adúltera	Simone	Roberto Bodegas	
1977	Commissaire Moulin	Moulin's great-aunt	Robert Guez	TV series (1 episode)
1977	At Night All Cats Are Crazy	Madame Banalesco	Gérard Zingg	
1977	Peppermint Soda	Matron	Diane Kurys	
1977	Deux auteurs en folie		Joseph Drimal, Claude Fayard, François Gir & Jean-Paul Roux	TV Mini-Series
1978	La vierge folle	Duchess Charance	Jean Kerchbron (2)	TV movie
1980	Aéroport: Charter 2020	Simone	Pierre Lary	TV movie
1981	Les gaietés de la correctionnelle	Widow Dulion	Joannick Desclers & Jeannette Hubert	TV series (1 episode)
1981	Les amours des années grises	Madame Ammard	Gérard Thomas	TV series (1 episode)
1982	L'épreuve	Madame Argante	Claude Santelli	TV movie
1982	Paris-Saint-Lazare	Woman from Guerin	Marco Pico	TV Mini-Series
1984	Le château		Jean Kerchbron (3)	TV movie
1985	Hôtel du siècle	Honorine	Jean Kerchbron (4)	TV series
1985	Le diamant de Salisbury	Nanny	Christiane Spiero	TV movie
1986	L'ami Maupassant	Charlotte Cachelin	Alain Dhénaut	TV series (1 episode)
1986	Cinéma 16	Madeleine	Jean-Claude Charnay	TV series (1 episode)
1986	Mademoiselle B	Mademoiselle Toutard	Bernard Queysanne	TV movie
1987	Les fortifs	Lady in blue	Marco Pico (2)	TV movie
1987	Qui c'est ce garçon?	Aunt Madeline	Nadine Trintignant	TV Mini-Series
1988	La sonate pathétique	Madame Tchourikova	Jean-Paul Carrère	TV series
1989	La grande cabriole	Delphine de Nocé	Nina Companeez	TV Mini-Series
1989	Le saut du lit	Marie-Odile Dumur des Rosiers	Pierre Cavassilas	TV movie
1990	Tatie Danielle	Tatie Danielle	Étienne Chatiliez	Nominated - César Award for Best Actress
1990	Marie Pervenche	Madame Dubois-Joubert	Serge Korber	TV series (1 episode)
1992	Les eaux dormantes	Aunt	Jacques Tréfouel	
1993	La Soif de l'or	Mémé Zézette	Gérard Oury	
1997	Et si on faisait un bébé?	Manou	Christiane Spiero (2)	TV movie
2000	Family Pack	Lea	Chris Vander Stappen	
2001	The Musketeer	Madame Lacross	Peter Hyams	
2003	Le pacte du silence	Mother Joseph	Graham Guit	
2003	Mauvais esprit	Baker's lady	Patrick Alessandrin	
2003	L'adorable femme des neiges	Félicie	Jean-Marc Vervoort	TV movie
2004	Le choix de Macha	Hortense	Marianne Lamour	TV movie
2004	Haute coiffure	Simone	Marc Rivière	TV movie
2004	Tout le plaisir est pour moi	Gaby	Isabelle Broué	
2005	Fabien Cosma	Madame Pignon	Bruno Gantillon	TV series (1 episode)
2006	En fanfare	Godelieve	Véronique Jadin	Short
2007	Zone libre	Madame Schwartz	Christophe Malavoy	
2007	Let's Dance	Tatiana	Noémie Lvovsky	
2008	Chez Maupassant	Mother Magloire	Claude Chabrol (2)	TV series (1 episode)
2008	Pandora's Box	Nusret	Yeşim Ustaoğlu	Cinemanila International Film Festival - Best Actress; San Sebastián International Film Festival - Best Actress
2009	Soeur Sourire	Oldest Dominican	Stijn Coninx	
2009	Persécution	Old woman	Patrice Chéreau	
2009	Au siècle de Maupassant	Eugénie de Morville	Gérard Jourd'hui	TV series (1 episode)
2007-10	Melting Pot Café	Elisabeth	Jean-Marc Vervoort (2)	TV series (18 episodes)
2012	Les pieds dans le plat	Sonia	Simon Astier	TV movie
2013	Landes	Madame Laraillet	François-Xavier Vives	

== Awards ==
- 1991: nominated to the César of best actress for Tatie Danielle.
- 1991: nominated to the Molière of comedy for En conduisant Miss Daisy.
- 1994: Molière of comedy for Les Chaises.
- 1997: nominated to the Molière of comedy for Le Mal de mère.
- 2000: knight of the Légion d'honneur
- 2008: best female interpretation at the San Sebastián International Film Festival for La Boîte de Pandore.
- 2009: best female interpretation at the Festival du film d’aventures de Valenciennes for La Boîte de Pandore and Sœur Sourire.
- 2009: Best Performance of the 27th Fajr International Film Festival ("World Panorama" section) for Pandora's Box, along with Derya Alabora and Ovul Avkiran
