= Renée Passeur =

French actress (1905–1975)

- Born: Renée Griotteray; 21 October 1905; Paris
- Died: 16 January 1975 (aged 69); Paris
- Occupation: Actress
- Years active: 1927 - 1965
- Spouse: Steve Passeur

Renée Passeur (21 October 1905 – 16 January 1975) was a French actress and singer. Extravagant personality of the so-called Tout-Paris, Renée Passeur embodied eccentric characters in films. She was the spouse of author and screenwriter Steve Passeur (1899-1966).

== Partial filmography ==
- 1928: Dans l'ombre du harem (by Léon Mathot and André Liabel)
- 1928: L'Occident (by Henri Fescourt) - Arnaud's fiancée
- 1929: The Wonderful Day (by René Barberis) - L'inconnue
- 1930: La nuit est à nous (by Roger Lion) - (uncredited)
- 1931: Roumanie, terre d'amour (by Camille de Morlhon) - Zanfira
- 1931: Mon cœur et ses millions (by André Berthomieu) (under the name Modeste Arveyres) - Yolande de Vaneuse
- 1931: Monsieur cambriole (Short, by Maurice de Canonge)
- 1931: Diablette (Short, by Lucien Jaquelux)
- 1932: L'Affaire Blaireau (by Henry Wulschleger) - Mademoiselle de Chaville
- 1932: Les tutti-frutti (Short, by Jean Gourguet)
- 1933: Les Surprises du sleeping (by Karl Anton)
- 1934: Surprise partie (Short, by Marc Didier)
- 1934: Six trente cinq (Short, by Pierre de Rameroy)
- 1940: Face au destin (by Henri Fescourt)
- 1951: Young Love (by Guy Lefranc) - Léa
- 1953: Carnival (by Henri Verneuil) - an aunt
- 1953: Le Guérisseur (by Yves Ciampi) - the countess
- 1954: Les Intrigantes (by Henri Decoin) - Mme Marcange, the author's wife
- 1955: Papa, maman, ma femme et moi (by Jean-Paul Le Chanois) - la visiteuse snob
- 1955: L'impossible Monsieur Pipelet (by André Hunebelle) - Mme Richet, the landlord's wife
- 1955: The Little Rebels (by Jean Delannoy) - Francis's grandmother
- 1956: Maid in Paris (by Pierre Gaspard-Huit) - the woman with the gigolo
- 1956: Les carottes sont cuites (by Robert Vernay)
- 1957: La Garçonne (by Jacqueline Audry) - Mme Sorbier
- 1958: Rafles sur la ville (by Pierre Chenal) - the gamer
- 1958: Le Miroir à deux faces (by André Cayatte) - Carine, a patient of doctor Bosc
- 1959: Oh ! Qué mambo (by John Berry) - lady Gobert, a student of the fitness teacher on the beach
- 1959: Les Liaisons dangereuses (by Roger Vadim) - a guest of the Valmont (uncredited)
- 1961: Captain Fracasse (by Pierre Gaspard-Huit) - Dame Léonarde, the duenna of the troop
- 1963: Strip-tease (by Jacques Poitrenaud) - the rich woman
- 1964: Circle of Love (by Roger Vadim) - the neighbour
- 1964: Male Companion (by Philippe de Broca) - the boss
- 1965: La Métamorphose des cloportes (by Pierre Granier-Deferre) - a friend of Léone

== Theatre ==
- 1951: La Reine Mère ou Les Valois terribles Opéra-bouffe by Pierre Devaux, music by Georges Van Parys, directed by Michel de Ré, Théâtre du Quartier latin
- 1952: N'écoutez pas, mesdames ! by Sacha Guitry, directed by the author, Théâtre des Variétés
