= Société des Cinéromans =

The Société des Cinéromans was a French film production company of the silent movie era.

== History ==
In 1919, Gaston Leroux founded the Société des Cinéromans in Nice with René Navarre and Arthur Bernède to publish novels and turn them into films.

The company was taken over by Pathé in 1922. It continued producing films until 1930.

== Filmography ==
- 1919: La Nouvelle Aurore in 16 episodes ;
- 1920: Tue-la-mort (1920) en 12 episodes, where his daughter Madeleine, aged 13, took the role of Canzonetta ;
- 1921: Le Sept de trèfle in 12 episodes ;
- 1922: Rouletabille chez les bohémiens in 10 episodes.

Under Pathé:

- 1922: Rouletabille chez les bohémiens by Henri Fescourt
- 1922: L'homme aux trois masques
- 1922: Impéria
- 1923: Gossette
- 1923: L'enfant roi
- 1923: Tao
- 1923: Vidocq
- 1924: La goutte de sang
- 1924: Le secret d'Alta Rocca
- 1924: L'enfant des halles
- 1924: Mandrin by Henri Fescourt
- 1925: Les misérables, by Henri Fescourt
- 1925: Fanfan-la-Tulipe
- 1925: Mylord l'Arsouille
- 1926: Le Juif errant
- 1926: Titi premier, roi des gosses
- 1926: L'espionne aux yeux noirs
- 1926: Surcouf
- 1926: Jean Chouan
- 1926: Cinders ... Production Company
- 1926: En plongée
- 1927: La petite chocolatière
- 1927: Story of a Poor Young Man (a.k.a. Mitgiftjäger) Production Company (co-production)
- 1927: Captain Rascasse
- 1927: The Loves of Casanova
- 1927: Feu!
- 1927: Colette the Unwanted, by René Barberis
- 1927: The Five Cents of Lavarede
- 1927: Belphégor
- 1927: La Glu by Henri Fescourt
- 1927: The Duel, by Jacques de Baroncelli
- 1927: Poker d'as
- 1928: L'argent
- 1928: Prince Jean
- 1928: The Vein by René Barberis
- 1928: L'occident by Henri Fescourt
- 1928: Princesse Masha
- 1928: La storia di una piccola Parigina
- 1928: La petite fonctionnaire
- 1928: Croquette
- 1928: In Old Stamboul
- 1928: Karina the Dancer
- 1929: The Unknown Dancer ... Production Company
- 1929: Le ruisseau
- 1929: La tentation
- 1929: Paris-Girls
- 1929: La femme et le pantin
- 1929: La merveilleuse journée
- 1929: Les fils du soleil

== Bibliography ==
- Francis Lacassin La Société des Cinéromans (1918–1930)
