= Mauprat =

Mauprat refers to:

- Mauprat (novel), a novel by George Sand
- Mauprat (film), a French silent film based on the novel
