= The Wonderful Day (1929 film) =

1929 film

- Directed by: René Barberis
- Written by: René Barberis; Yves Mirande (play); Gustave Quinson
- Starring: Dolly Davis; André Roanne; Renée Passeur
- Cinematography: Raoul Aubourdier
- Production companies: Films de France; Société des Cinéromans
- Distributed by: Pathé Consortium Cinéma
- Release date: 1 March 1929
- Country: France
- Languages: Silent; French intertitles

The Wonderful Day (French: La merveilleuse journée) is a 1929 French silent comedy film directed by René Barberis and starring Dolly Davis, André Roanne and Renée Passeur. It was remade as the sound film The Wonderful Day in 1932.

== Cast ==
- Dolly Davis as Gladys - une infirmière
- André Roanne as Blaise - un préparateur en pharmacie
- Renée Passeur as L'inconnue
- Sylvio De Pedrelli as Le milliardaire Felloux
- Marcel Lesieur as Le docteur Gébus
- Reine Derns as Léocadie
- Stella Dargis
- Léon Larive as Le pharmacien Pinède
- Pierre Delmonde
- Albert Mafer as Le capitaine
- Jane Dolys
- Jane Pierson

== Bibliography ==
- Philippe Rège. Encyclopedia of French Film Directors, Volume 1. Scarecrow Press, 2009.
