= Les Misérables (1925 film) =

1925 film

- French film poster
- Directed by: Henri Fescourt
- Written by: Henri Fescourt; Arthur Bernède
- Based on: Les Misérables; 1862 novel by Victor Hugo
- Produced by: Henri Fescourt; Louis Nalpas; Jean Sapene
- Starring: Gabriel Gabrio; Paul Jorge; Sandra Milovanoff
- Cinematography: Raoul Aubourdier; Léon Donnot; Georges Lafont; Karémine Mérobian
- Edited by: Jean-Louis Bouquet
- Production company: Société des Cinéromans
- Distributed by: Pathé Consortium Cinéma
- Release date: 1925
- Running time: 359 minutes
- Country: France
- Language: Silent (French intertitles)

Les Misérables is a 1925 French silent drama film directed by Henri Fescourt, based on the 1862 novel of the same name by Victor Hugo.

== Plot summary ==
Part 1

Part 2

Part 3

Part 4

Les Misérables (1925)

== Production ==
Although Cinéromans wanted the adaptation to be a single feature film, Fescourt successfully argued for it to be released in four feature-length parts.

Filming took place from 24 March until 24 December 1925 in Digne, Provence, Arras, Montreuil, and the Joinville Studios.

Cinéromans assigned a six million franc budget for the film. Funding was provided by the Westi Consortium, but in August 1925 it went bankrupt, meaning many scenes, such as the barricades, were shot in the studio.

== Distribution and restoration ==
=== French release ===
It was released in France in four parts, released in weekly instalments on 25 December 1925, 31 December 1925, 8 January 1926, and 15 January 1926. Each part was precisely 2000 metres of film long.

Even before the French premiere, it was reported in Universal Weekly that Universal Pictures had obtained the rights to reproduce the film.

=== British release ===
An abridged version running at around four hours had its British premiere on 9 April 1926 in a trade performance at the London Hippodrome, beginning with a staged prologue featuring many of the actors from the film emerging from a large book and walking "across the stage before the sleeping figure of Victor Hugo". It was attended by Fescourt himself, as well as ambassadors and ministers from multiple countries. This performance was followed by a tour of trade performances in Birmingham, Manchester, Newcastle, Glasgow, Leeds, Liverpool, and Cardiff. David Lloyd George also had a private viewing of the film in his own home.

In November 1926, it was released to the British public in cinemas around the country in two parts: 'The Soul of Humanity' and 'The Barricades'. Together these totalled 22 reels, coming to a running time of 280 minutes.

=== American release ===
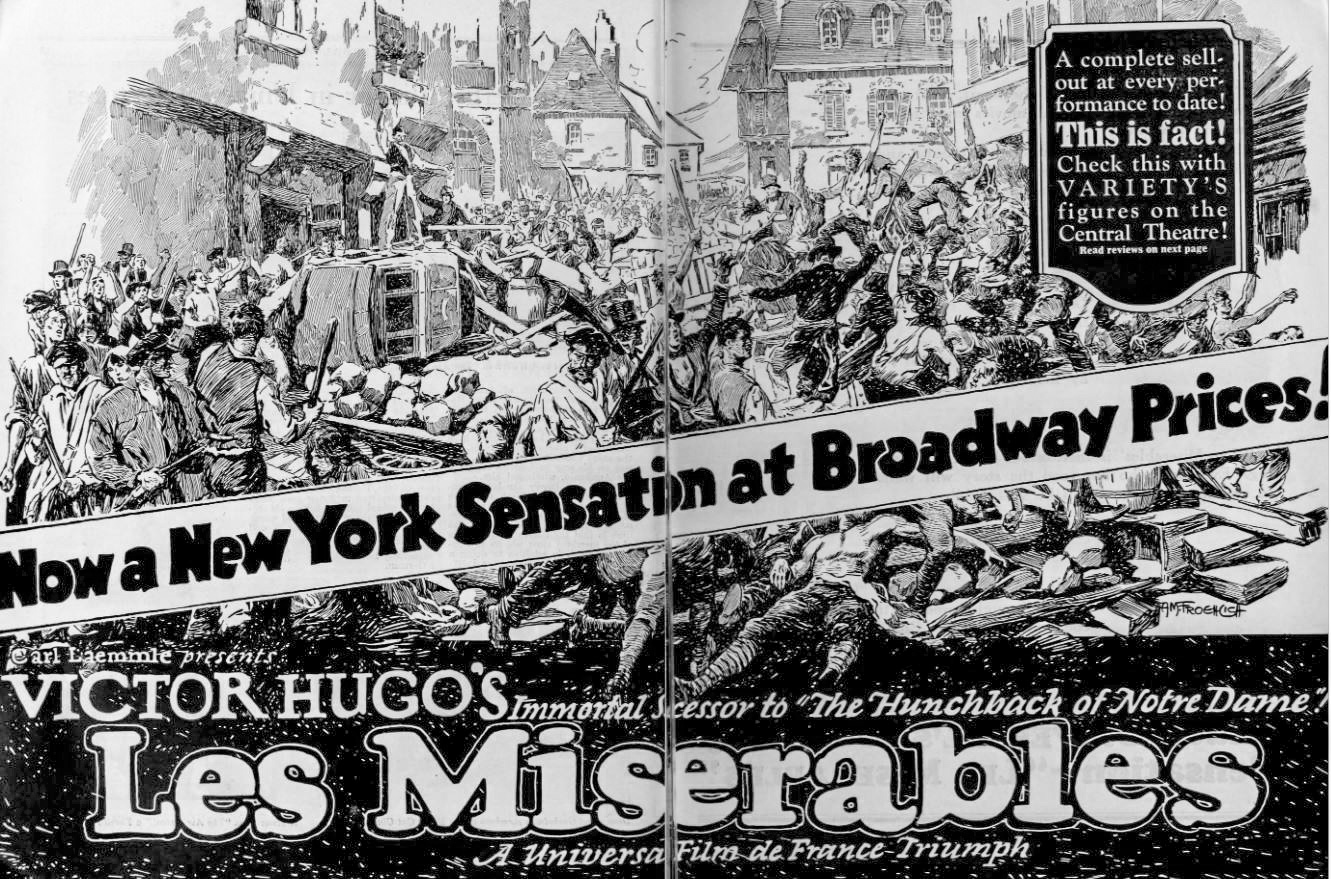
Advertisement for the August 1927 Broadway showing of Les Misérables (1925) in Universal Weekly

The American premiere took place in the Forrest Theatre, Philadelphia to an invite-only audience on 24 June 1926, followed by a similar showing in Washington, D.C. the following day.

An abridged version from Universal was released on Broadway in August 1927 at the Central Theatre with music by Hugo Riesenfeld. This followed a one-night-only showing of a longer, but still abridged to 15 reels, version at Carnegie Hall on 8 July 1926. It was reported that "At noon on Sunday, August 28th [1927], the box office at the Central Theatre was forced to close while the police attempted to clear a passageway in front of the theatre" due to the film's popularity. People stood in the theatre to watch it, resulting in the Central Theatre showing to audiences of 15% over capacity in the first five days and ran "an impromptu special performance", as reported in Universal Weekly. It was also shown in Brooklyn's new Montmartre Theatre simultaneously. It was then shown at other locations around the country. Rudmer Canjels writes that there were "two versions the exhibitor could eventually choose from in 1927: a 12-reel version [...] and an eight-reel version that eliminated the character of Fantine."

A 9.5mm abridged version was released in 1931 with English intertitles for home viewing.

=== 2014 restoration ===
It was restored in 2014 by a collaboration between the Centre national du cinéma et de l'image animée (CNC), the Cinémathèque de Toulouse, Pathé, and the Jérôme Seydoux-Pathé Foundation. They restored the film from negatives at the CNC and the Cinémathèque de Toulouse, and also used a reel of intertitles and scripts containing Fescourt's annotations. The restoration effort began in March and finished in November 2014, and involved editing 12,000 metres of film down to 8490 metres. Music by Roch Havet was added from a recording at the May 2016 Festival d'Anères.

== Cast ==
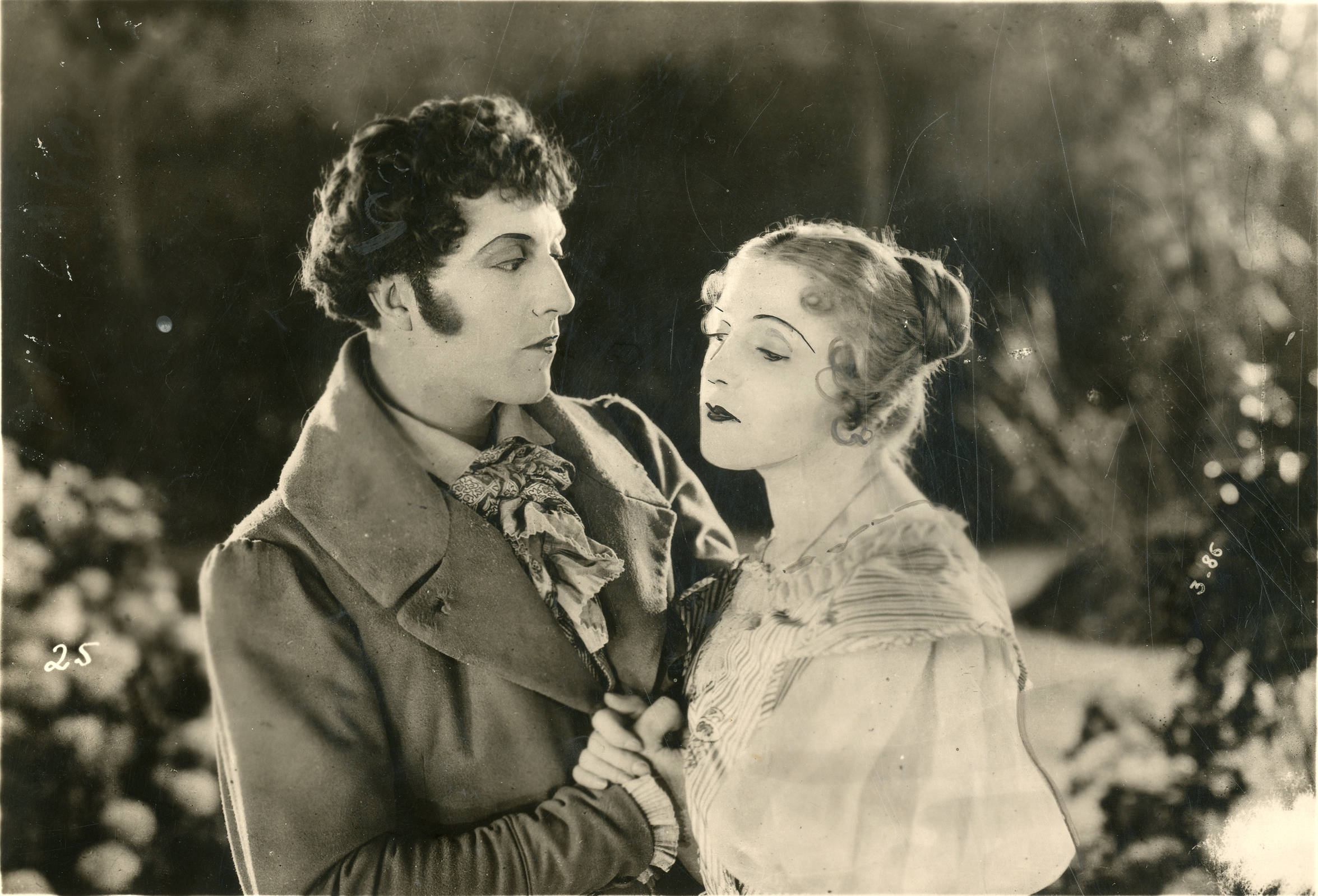
François Rozet and Sandra Milovanoff in Les Misérables

- Gabriel Gabrio as Jean Valjean
- Paul Jorge as Monseigneur Myriel
- Sandra Milovanoff as Fantine and Cosette
- Andrée Rolane as Cosette (child)
- Jean Toulout as Javert
- François Rozet as Marius
- Paul Guidé as Enjolras
- Charles Badiole as Gavroche
- Maillard as Gillenormand
- Clara Darcey-Roche as Mlle Baptistine
- Georges Saillard as Thénardier
- Suzanne Nivette as Éponine (as Nivette Saillard)
- Renée Carl as La Thénardier
- Émilien Richard as Bamatabois (as Émilien Richaud)
- Marcelle Barry as Mme Victorine (uncredited)
- Gilbert Dacheux as Le domestique (uncredited)
- Luc Dartagnan as Pontmercy (uncredited)
- Sylviane de Castillo as Soeur Simplice (uncredited)
- Victor Dujeu as Fauchelevent (uncredited)
- Jeanne Marie-Laurent as Mme Magloire (uncredited)
- Jeanne Méa as Mlle Gillenormand (uncredited)

== See also ==
- Adaptations of Les Misérables
