= Kiss Me (1929 film) =

1929 film

- Directed by: Robert Péguy
- Written by: Tristan Bernard (play); Yves Mirande (play); Gustave Quinson (play); Robert Péguy
- Starring: Charles Prince; Suzanne Bianchetti; Jacques Arnna; Bonaventura Ibáñez
- Cinematography: Paul Guichard
- Release date: 8 February 1929
- Country: France
- Languages: Silent; French intertitles

Kiss Me (French: Embrassez-moi) is a 1929 French silent comedy film directed by Robert Péguy and starring Charles Prince, Suzanne Bianchetti and Jacques Arnna. It was remade in 1932 as a sound film Kiss Me.

== Cast ==
- Charles Prince as Boucatel
- Suzanne Bianchetti as Marquise Aurore
- Jacques Arnna as Vicompte de Listrac
- Hélène Hallier as Géraldine
- Geneviève Cargese as Comtesse de la Tour d'Argent
- Henri Richard
- Félix Barre as Marquis de Champavert
- Ernest Verne as Gaston de Champavert
- Marcel Lesieur
- Eliane Tayar
- Bonaventura Ibáñez

== Bibliography ==
- Dayna Oscherwitz & MaryEllen Higgins. The A to Z of French Cinema. Scarecrow Press, 2009.
