= Men of Prey =

1937 film

- Directed by: Willy Rozier
- Written by: Willy Rozier; Francis Didelot
- Produced by: Willy Rozier
- Starring: Jeanne Boitel; Jean Galland; Jean-Max
- Cinematography: Marc Bujard
- Edited by: Raymond Leboursier
- Music by: Jean Yatove
- Production company: Fédéral Film
- Distributed by: Pellegrin Cinéma
- Release date: 2 July 1937
- Running time: 87 minutes
- Country: France
- Language: French

Men of Prey (French: Les hommes de proie) is a 1937 French crime drama film directed by Willy Rozier and starring Jeanne Boitel, Jean Galland and Jean-Max. The film's sets were designed by the art director Jean Douarinou.

== Synopsis ==
After a blackmailer is murdered suspicion points to one his victims. However the murderer now begins to blackmail her.

== Cast ==
- Jeanne Boitel as Michelle Korany
- Jean Galland as Marice Vauzelle
- Jean-Max as Le prince Korany
- Maurice Lagrenée as Lucien
- Georges Mauloy as Le directeur
- Régine Grandais as Colette
- Pierre Etchepare as Johnnie Dupont
- Eva Barcinska as Nadia
- André Bertoux as Le chauffeur
- Hugues de Bagratide as Elias Karhoum
- Nita Georges as La secrétaire
- Gilberte Joney as Jacqueline
- Marinette Luppi as Josy
- Blanche Margat as La soubrette
- Frédéric Mariotti as L'hôtelier
- Lola Venda as La créole
- Victor Vina as Le commissaire

== Bibliography ==
- Bessy, Maurice & Chirat, Raymond. Histoire du cinéma français: 1935-1939. Pygmalion, 1986.
- Crisp, Colin. Genre, Myth and Convention in the French Cinema, 1929-1939. Indiana University Press, 2002.
- Rège, Philippe. Encyclopedia of French Film Directors, Volume 1. Scarecrow Press, 2009.
