= Sandra Milovanoff =

French actress

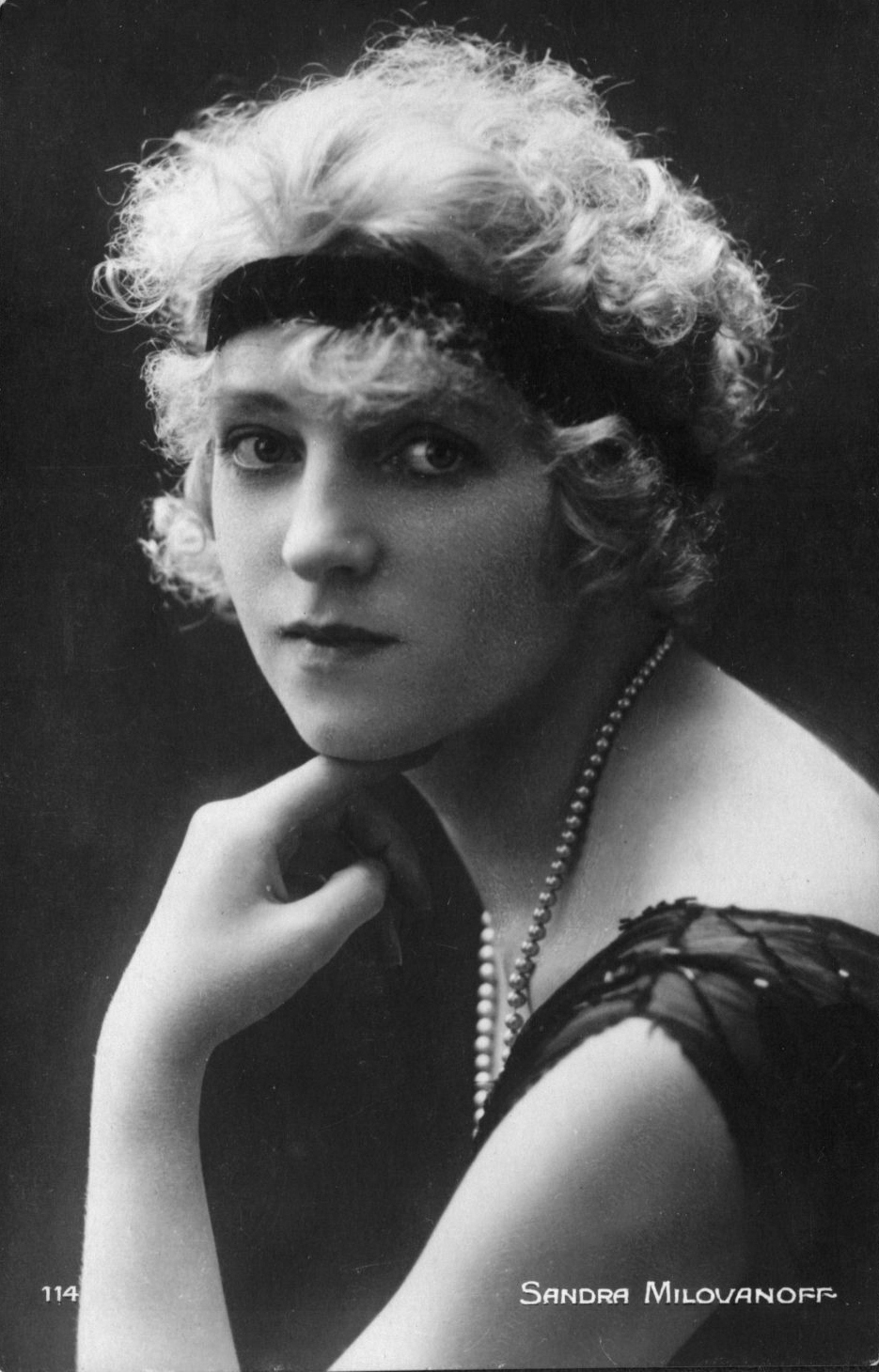
- Born: Alexandrine Aleksejevna Milovanova; 23 June 1892; St. Petersburg, Russian Empire
- Died: 8 May 1957 (aged 64); Paris, France
- Resting place: Cimetière parisien de Pantin
- Other name: Sandra Milowanoff
- Occupation: Actress
- Years active: 1917–1950
- Spouses: Mikhail Nikitin (died); Maurice de Moolek (divorced); Joseph Mejinsky
- Children: 1

Sandra Milovanoff (born Alexandrine Aleksejevna Milovanova, 23 June 1892 – 8 May 1957), also known as Sandra Milovanov, was a Russian-French actress known for her roles in French cinema during the silent era.

== Biography ==
Alexandrine Aleksejevna Milovanova was born on 23 June 1892 into a bourgeois family, the daughter of Aleksej Milovanov and Marija Milovanova (née Smirnova).

Milovanova attended the Tchiszakoff Dance School in St. Petersburg from 1900 to 1908. She became a member of Anna Pavlova's dance troupe, and, two years later, she became a part of Sergei Diaghilev's Ballets Russes, and toured across Europe. While performing in London, World War I broke out, and the company found themselves stranded there.

In 1916, Milovanova returned to Russia, and was hired at the Nicholas II Theater. The October Revolution forced Milovanova to flee from Russia to Monte Carlo, where she planned to continue her work in the Ballets Russes. Instead, director René Navarre took notice of her, and Milovanova signed a contract with Gaumont, making her film debut in La p'tite du sixième (1917) as Sandra Milovanoff.

Louis Feuillade became fascinated by Milovanoff, and she next starred in Feuillade's film serial The Two Girls (1921) alongside Olinda Mano and Violette Jyl, followed by L'orpheline (1921), and Parisette (1921). Milovanoff became a very famous actress throughout France, and was ranked only second to Mary Pickford on a popularity scale in a magazine.

After her contract with Gaumont expired, Jacques de Baroncelli began managing her career. She then starred in The Legend of Sister Beatrix (1923), Nène (1924), which she received praise for her performance in, The Phantom of the Moulin Rouge (1925), directed by René Clair, Les Misérables (1925), and The Prey of the Wind (1926), which asserted her as a tragedienne.

After starring in Mauprat (1926), directed by Jean Epstein, Milovanoff's career took off internationally. In Germany, she played a supporting role in Make Up (1927) with Marcella Albani and Werner Krauss, in Sweden she acted in Gustaf Molander's Sealed Lips (1927), and La Condesa María (1928) in Spain.

With the advent of sound, Milovanoff's career began to falter, as her Slavic accent was considered unsuitable for talkies. She made only one film in the 1930s, Dans la nuit (1930), in which she played Charles Vanel's wife. She attempted to resume her career as a dancer, but by this time was too old. She married for a second time to Maurice de Moolek, with whom she had a daughter.

She returned to film in the 1940s, appearing in Après Mein Kampf, mes crimes (1940), The Last Judgment (1945), and The Private Life of an Actor (1948). She made her final screen appearance in Ils ont vingt ans (1950).

Milovanoff remarried a third time to makeup artist Joseph Mejinsky, and died in Paris on 8 May 1957. She is buried at Cimetière parisien de Pantin.

== Filmography ==
Year	Title	Role	Notes
1917	La p'tite du sixième		
1921	The Two Girls	Ginette	
1921	L'orpheline	Jeannette	
1921	Parisette	Parisette	
1922	Le fils du flibustier	Bertrande / Josette Bertrand	
1922	Le sens de la mort		
1923	Le gamin de Paris	Lisette	
1923	La légende de soeur Béatrix	Béatrix	
1924	Nène	Nène	
1924	La flambée des rêves	Claire	
1924	Pêcheur d'Islande	God	
1925	The Phantom of the Moulin Rouge	Yvonne Vincent	
1925	Jocaste	Hélène Haviland	
1925	Les Misérables	Fantine / Cosette	
1926	Mauprat	Edmée de Mauprat	
1927	Colette the Unwanted	Marie	
1927	The Prey of the Wind	Helene	
1927	Make Up	Kitty Lerron	
1927	Sealed Lips	Marian Wood	
1928	La condesa María		
1928	The Vein	Charlotte Lagnier	
1928	La faute de Monique		
1929	The Best Mistress	Denise	
1930	Dans la nuit	Sa femme	
1940	Après Mein Kampf mes crimes	Madame Schleicher	
1945	The Last Judgment	Madame Svoboda	
1948	Le comédien	La servante russe	
1950	They Are Twenty	La mère d'Anita	(final film role)

== Bibliography ==
- Celia McGerr. René Clair. Twayne Publishers, 1980.
