= Charles Prince (actor) =

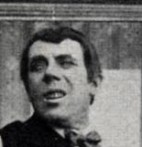
- Actor Charles Prince in the early 1910s
- Born: Charles Prince Seigneur; 27 April 1872; Maisons-Laffitte, Seine-et-Oise, Île-de-France, France
- Died: 18 July 1933 (aged 61); Paris, France
- Occupations: Actor; comedian; screenwriter; film director
- Years active: 1906–1933

Charles Prince Seigneur (27 April 1872 – 18 July 1933) was a French-born film actor and comedian, best known for his screen persona "Rigadin" in numerous short slapstick comedies. He was also known as "Moritz" in Germany, "Whiffles" in England and the US, and "Tartufini" in Italy. He was the second biggest film star in the world in the years leading up to World War I, just behind his rival Max Linder. Prince's "Rigadin" character was similar to Linder's "Max" in that they were both upper-class dandies that were constantly getting into trouble with authority figures and love interests. Prince began his acting career on the stage and was hired by Pathé Frères in 1908. He made more than 200 films as "Rigadin" from 1909 until 1920. By 1920 his popularity had faded and he played supporting roles in a handful of films in the 1920s and 1930s. Two of his Rigadin shorts, Rigadin Directeur de Cinéma and Rigadin et le Chien de la Baronne, were preserved by the Academy Film Archive in 2010.

== Personal life ==
In 1900 he married Aimée Campton, an English dancer working in Paris Their only daughter was Renée Petitdemange (1901–1993). The couple divorced in April 1905 Prince's great-grandson is French film director Cris Ubermann.

== Selected filmography ==
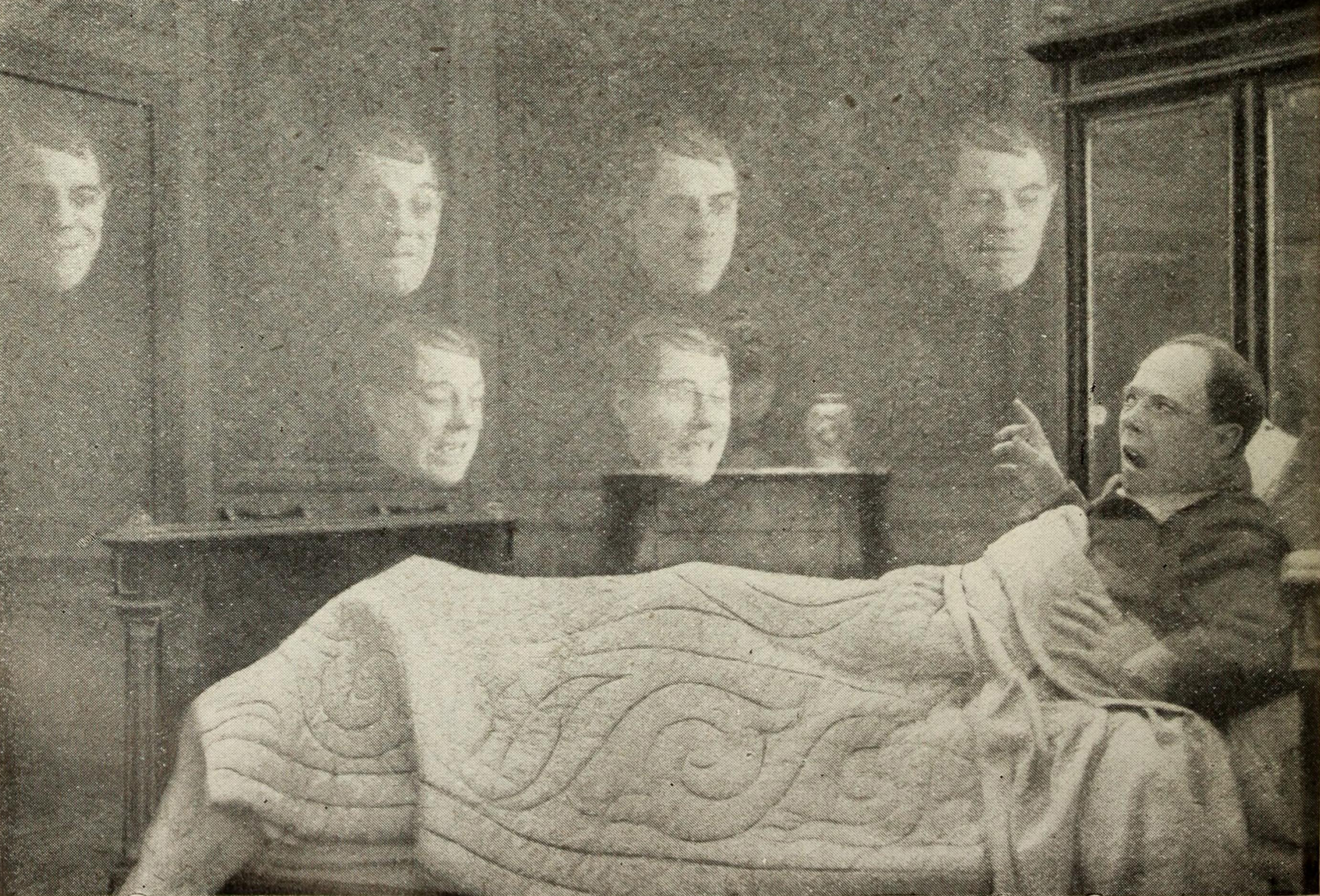
Les Terreurs de Rigadin (1911)

- 1912 Rigadin Peintre Cubiste
- 1912 Rigadin aux Balkans
- 1913 Rigadin, Winetaster
- A Royal Family (1915)
- Kiss Me (1929)
- Departure (1931)
- His Highness Love (1931)
- Buridan's Donkey (1932)
- His Best Client (1932)
