= Karina the Dancer =

1928 film

- Directed by: Henri Fescourt
- Written by: Henri Fescourt
- Based on: La maison du Maltais by Jean Vignaud
- Starring: Marie-Louise Vois; Sylvio De Pedrelli; Louis Vonelly; Bonaventura Ibáñez
- Cinematography: Maurice Arnou; Henri Stuckert
- Production companies: Films de France; Société des Cinéromans
- Release date: 18 January 1928
- Running time: 90 minutes
- Country: France
- Languages: Silent; French intertitles

Karina the Dancer (French: La maison du Maltais) is a 1928 French silent drama film directed by Henri Fescourt and starring Marie-Louise Vois, Sylvio De Pedrelli, Louis Vonelly. The film is based on a novel by Jean Vignaud, which was later adapted into 1938 film Sirocco directed by Pierre Chenal.

== Synopsis ==
In Tunis, Matteo who is half-Bedouin and half-Maltese falls in love with the dancer Safia. However she leaves him for a wealthy French jeweller and leaves with him for France. Matteo follows her to Paris where he meets but ultimately rejects the love of a Frenchwoman as he is obsessed with gaining his revenge on Safia. He then kidnaps her to bring her back to lock her up in his house in Tunisia, but the intervention of his old Christian Maltese father leads him to release her.

== Cast ==
- Marie-Louise Vois as Safia
- Sylvio De Pedrelli as Matteo
- Louis Vonelly as Jeweller
- Bonaventura Ibáñez as Old Maltese
- André Nicolle as Vlahos
- Jeanne Marnier
- Lydia Zaréna
- Paul Francheschi
- Nita Alvarez
- Simone d'A-Lal
- Jean Godaret

== Bibliography ==
- Goble, Alan. The Complete Index to Literary Sources in Film. Walter de Gruyter, 1999.
- Kennedy-Karpat, Colleen. Rogues, Romance, and Exoticism in French Cinema of the 1930s. Fairleigh Dickinson, 2013.
