= Romola (film) =

1924 film

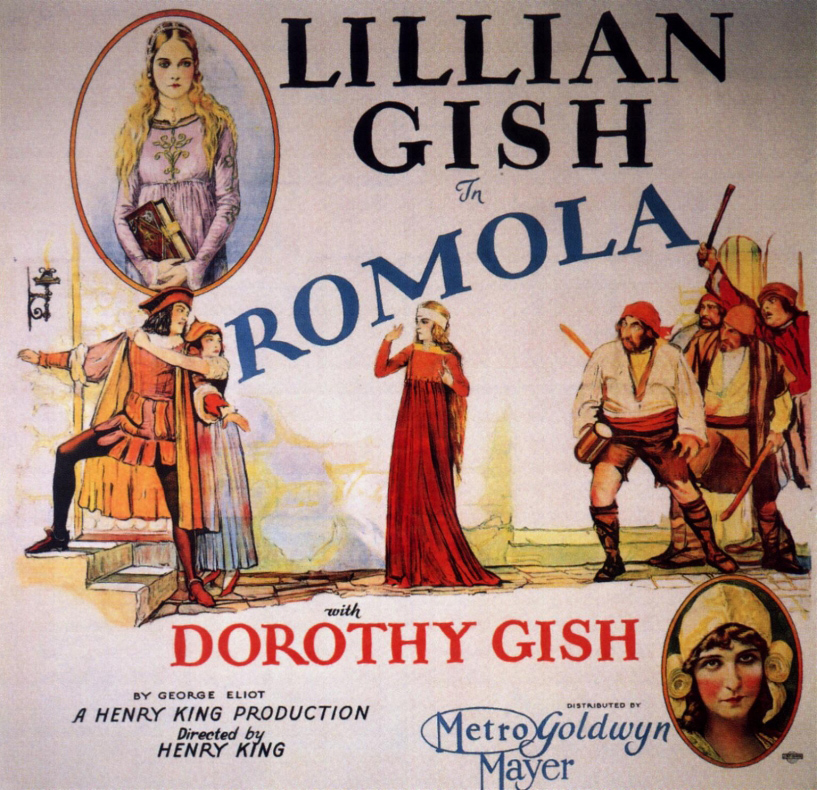
- Theatrical release poster
- Directed by: Henry King
- Written by: Will M. Ritchey; Jules Furthman; Don Bartlett
- Based on: Romola by George Eliot
- Produced by: Henry King
- Starring: Lillian Gish; Dorothy Gish; William Powell; Ronald Colman; Bonaventura Ibáñez
- Cinematography: Roy F. Overbaugh; William Schurr
- Edited by: W. Duncan Mansfield
- Music by: Louis F. Gottschalk
- Distributed by: Metro-Goldwyn-Mayer
- Release date: December 6, 1924
- Running time: 120 minutes
- Country: United States
- Language: Silent (English intertitles)

Romola is a 1924 American silent drama film directed by Henry King and shot on location in Italy. The film stars Lillian Gish, Dorothy Gish, William Powell, and Ronald Colman, and is based on the 1863 George Eliot novel of the same name.

This was the second film in which Henry King directed Lillian Gish and Ronald Colman for Inspiration Films, an independent production company which chiefly consisted of King, Charles Duell, and stars Lillian Gish and Richard Barthelmess.

== Plot ==
As described in a review in a film magazine, a boat approaching Italy is set upon by pirates and Baldassaro, a noted scholar, gives his adopted son Tito a ring that will be a passport with all men of learning. Tito escapes but Baldassaro is captured. Tito reaches Florence at the time that the people incited by the priest, Savonarola, has risen and cast out their ruler, Piero de Medici. Accidentally he aids Bardi, a blind man and noted scholar and is received with honors, finally winning consent to his marriage to his daughter Romola who loves Carlo, an artist. Through the aid of Spini, an adventurer who has become the real power behind the government, Tito rises to the post of chief magistrate. In the meantime he flirts with Tessa, a lowly street vendor, going through a mock marriage during a carnival, which is very real to Tessa, so he installs her in a house. A child is born to them. Tito shows his real nature when he sells the priceless books of Bardi, and Romola leaves him. He issues a decree that means death to Savonarola, but his ambition overleaps itself and he is chased by the mob. Jumping into the river followed by Tessa, Tito swims off, leaving her to drown. After floating downstream, he meets death by drowning at the hands of Baldassaro, whom he has refused to recognize. The dying Tessa urges Romola to care for her baby, and the two finally find happiness with Carlo who has remained faithful to her.

== Cast ==
- Lillian Gish as Romola
- Dorothy Gish as Tessa
- William Powell as Tito Melema (credited as William H. Powell)
- Ronald Colman as Carlo Bucellini
- Charles Willis Lane as Baldassar Calvo
- Herbert Grimwood as Girolamo Savonarola
- Bonaventura Ibáñez as Bardo Bardi
- Frank Puglia as Adolfo Spini
- Amelia Summerville as Brigida
- Tina Ceccaci Renaldi as Monna Ghita
- Eduilio Mucci as Nello
- Angela Scatigna as Bratti
- Ugo Uccellini as Bishop of Nemours
- Alfredo Martinelli as Captain of the Barque
- Attilo Deodati as Tomaso

== Production ==
Romola was part of a 1920s boomlet for American silent films shot on locations outside the United States. Such films were intended to attract American viewers through exotic locales, enhance the artistic prestige of directors, and make American films more appealing to foreign audiences. Examples of such films included The Christian (London: 1923), The Bright Shawl (Cuba: 1923), The Eternal City (Italy: 1923), Madame Sans-Gêne (France: 1925), The Four Feathers (Tanzania and Sudan: 1929) and White Shadows in the South Seas (Marquesas, Tahiti: 1928). After the end of the silent era, foreign locations did not become part of American filmmaking again until the 1950s.

William Powell later described the production of Romola as a 29-week comedy of errors starting with the capsizing of the boat for the pirate sequence at the onset of filming. Because no one in the company spoke Italian, the quest to obtain tights for Powell and Colman culminated in a two-week detour to Milan to a theatrical tailor for La Scala Opera House. When Powell and Colman returned to the sea-side town of Livorno, they found the film company had departed without leaving a forwarding address. Powell and Colman cabled company offices in London and New York but ran out of money for food while awaiting a response. Powell described it as the hungriest time of his life, when he envied town animals who had owners to feed them.

The shoot later became an idyll, with plenty of time to savor the pleasures of Florence and learn Italian, thanks to a relaxed production schedule.

== Reception ==
Biographer and film critic Edward Wagenknecht reports that Romola did poorly at the box office due to its lack of “melodramatic appeal.” The lackluster response among movie-goers reflected the failure of the filmmakers to endow Gish’s role with dramatic intensity. Lillian Gish registered the following assessment of the film:

It caused me so much trouble, and there are so many things in it I would have [done] different from what they are that I can never think of Romola now without a great feeling of sadness for what we might have done with that beautiful story.

== Preservation ==
A print of the film survives at the UCLA Film & Television Archive.
