= Véréna's Wedding =

1938 film

- Directed by: Jacques Daroy
- Written by: Lisa Wenger (novel); Emil Balmer; Claude Revol
- Produced by: Felix Beaujon; Benjamin Kady
- Starring: Jeanne Boitel; Pierre Larquey; Gina Manès
- Cinematography: Raoul Aubourdier
- Edited by: Max Eschig
- Music by: Pierre Vellones
- Production company: Les Producteurs Associés
- Distributed by: Films Champion
- Release date: 19 October 1938
- Running time: 87 minutes
- Countries: France; Switzerland
- Language: French

Véréna's Wedding (French: Le mariage de Véréna) is a 1938 French-Swiss drama film directed by Jacques Daroy and starring Jeanne Boitel, Pierre Larquey and Gina Manès. The film's sets were designed by the art director Raymond Tournon. It was shot at studios in Place de Clichy in Paris and on location around the Mürren and Grindelwald. It is also known by the alternative title La bâtarde.

== Synopsis ==
Véréna is seduced by a man who then does not marry her. She gives birth to a daughter and spends the next twenty years devoting herself to bringing her up properly.

== Cast ==
- Jeanne Boitel as Véréna Rainer
- Pierre Larquey as Gustave Peters
- Gina Manès as Marianne - 'la Noiraude'
- France Ellys as Mlle Peters
- Janine Borelli as Rési à 18 ans
- René Daix as Sepp
- Mady Berry as Elisa
- Lucien Gonnot as Dr. Schwarz
- Gérard Férat as Le fiancé de Rési
- Marie Finally as May à 18 ans
- Monique Romey as La fille de la 'la Noiraude'
- Odette Talazac as Fermière

== Bibliography ==
- Bessy, Maurice & Chirat, Raymond. Histoire du cinéma français: 1935-1939. Pygmalion, 1986.
- Crisp, Colin. Genre, Myth and Convention in the French Cinema, 1929-1939. Indiana University Press, 2002.
- Rège, Philippe. Encyclopedia of French Film Directors, Volume 1. Scarecrow Press, 2009.
