= Casanova (1934 film) =

1934 film

- Directed by: René Barberis
- Written by: René Barberis
- Produced by: Jean de Merly
- Starring: Ivan Mozzhukhin; Jeanne Boitel; Madeleine Ozeray
- Cinematography: Raoul Aubourdier; Fédote Bourgasoff
- Music by: Pierre Vellones; Walter Winnig
- Production company: M.J. Films
- Distributed by: La Compagnie Indépendante de Distribution
- Release date: 12 March 1934
- Running time: 94 minutes
- Country: France
- Language: French

Casanova is a 1934 French historical comedy drama film directed by René Barberis and starring Ivan Mozzhukhin, Jeanne Boitel and Madeleine Ozeray. The film's sets and costumes were designed by the art director Boris Bilinsky. It is loosely inspired by the life of Giacomo Casanova.

== Synopsis ==
The mid-eighteenth century. Casanova leaves his native Venice for Grenoble in France. There he has a fling with the attractive Anne Roman. Sometime later in Paris, he thwarts the plot of Madame Pompadour against Anne who has become Louis XV's new lover.

== Cast ==
- Ivan Mozzhukhin as Casanova
- Jeanne Boitel as Anne Roman, Baronne de Meilly-Coulonge
- Madeleine Ozeray as Angelica
- Marcelle Denya as La Pompadour
- Colette Darfeuil as La Corticelli
- Marguerite Moreno as Madame Morin
- Saturnin Fabre as M. Binetti
- Pierre Larquey as Pogomas
- Émile Drain as Mgr de Bernis
- Pierre Moreno as Castelbougnac
- Henry Laverne as Leduc
- Leda Ginelly as Mme Binetti
- Marthe Mussine as Une Servante
- Nicole de Rouves as Signora Manzoni
- Véra Markels as Femme du Gouverneur
- Victor Vina as M. de Sartine
- Wanda Warel as Une Soubrette
- Jacques Normand as Bragadin, un inquisiteur
- Jean Guilton as Le Gouverneur
- Léon Larive as M. de Boulogne
- Jacqueline Hopstein as Mme de Haussey, confidente
- Suzy Delair
- Jean Delannoy
- Loulou Rex
- Ethan Abbe

== Bibliography ==
- Philippe Rège. Encyclopedia of French Film Directors, Volume 1. Scarecrow Press, 2009.
