= Make Up (1927 film) =

1927 film

- Directed by: Felix Basch
- Written by: Guido Kreutzer (novel); Julius Urgiß
- Starring: Marcella Albani; Sandra Milovanoff; Werner Krauss
- Cinematography: Gustave Preiss
- Music by: Felix Bartsch
- Production company: Lothar Stark-Film
- Distributed by: Deutsch-Nordische Film-Union
- Release date: 24 May 1927
- Running time: 85 minutes
- Country: Germany
- Languages: Silent; German intertitles

Make Up (German: Da hält die Welt den Atem an) is a 1927 German silent film directed by Felix Basch and starring Marcella Albani, Sandra Milovanoff, and Werner Krauss.

The film's art direction was by Alfred Junge and Gustav A. Knauer.

== Cast ==
- Marcella Albani as Adda van Royt
- Sandra Milovanoff as Kitty Lerron
- Werner Krauss as Morris Broock
- Alfons Fryland as Klaus von Longard
- S. Z. Sakall as theater director
- Eduard von Winterstein as detective commissioner
- Ferdinand Bonn
- Karl Etlinger
- Fritz Kampers as electrician
- Rudolf Lettinger
- Boris Michailow
- Oskar Sachs
- Arthur Schröder as hotel director
- Gyula Szőreghy
- Charles Vanel
