= Bonaventura Ibáñez =

Spanish actor (1876–1932)

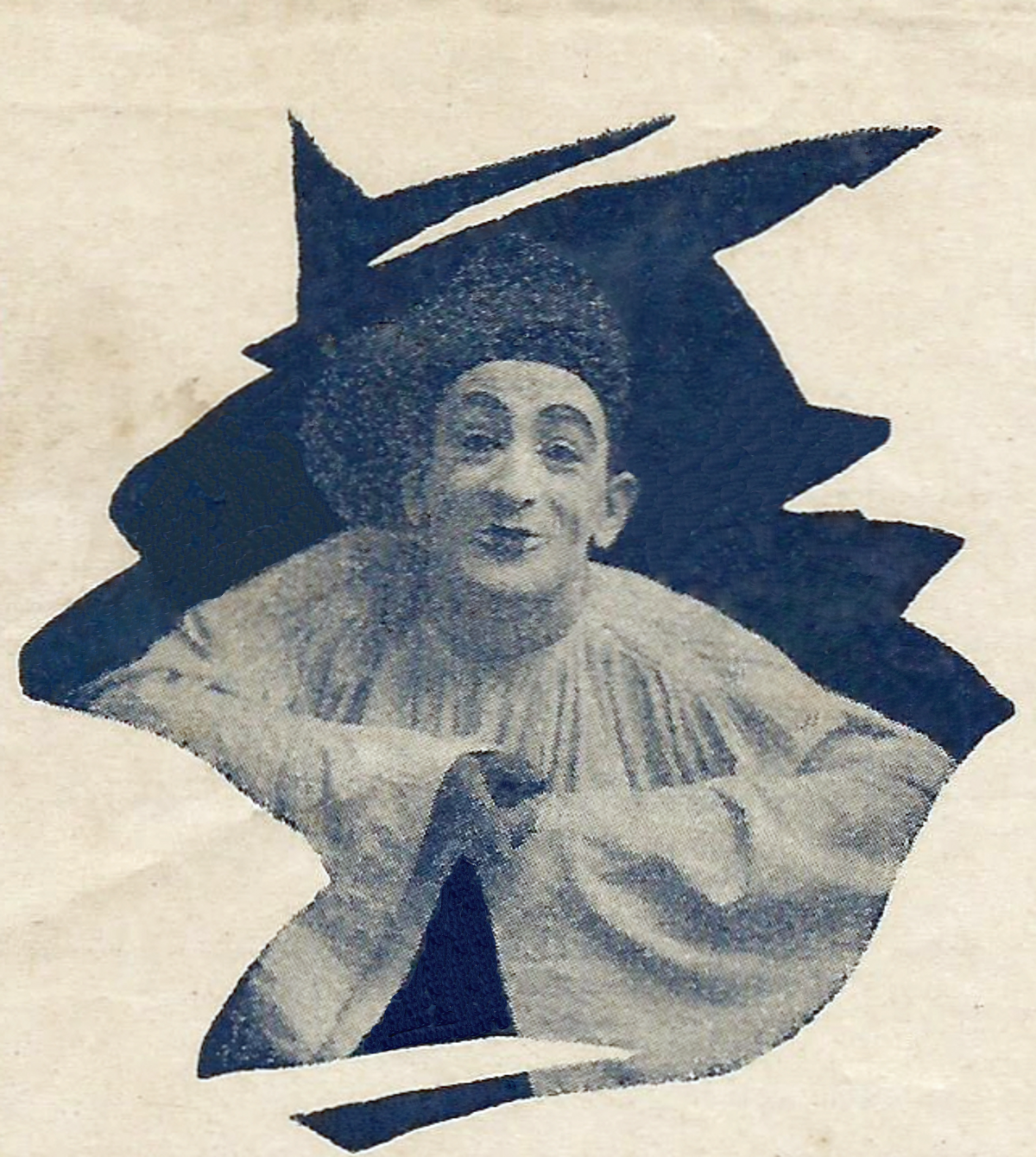
- Born: 18 February 1876; Barcelona, Spain
- Died: 1 May 1932 (aged 56); Barcelona, Spain
- Other names: Buenaventura Ibáñez, Ventura Ibáñez
- Occupation: Actor
- Years active: 1909–1931 (film)

Bonaventura Ibáñez (18 February 1876 – 1 May 1932) was a Spanish film actor of the silent and early sound eras.

== Selected filmography ==
- Wanda Warenine (1917)
- Romola (1924)
- The Faces of Love (1924)
- The Last Lord (1926)
- Croquette (1927)
- The Carnival of Venice (1928)
- Karina the Dancer (1928)
- Kiss Me (1929)
- L'Age d'Or (1930)

== Bibliography ==
- "Bonaventura Ibáñez". Filmlexicon degli autori e delle opere (in Italian). Vol. 3. 1959. p. 351. OCLC 75763680.
- Goble, Alan (1999). The Complete Index to Literary Sources in Film. London: Bowker-Saur. ISBN 1-85739-229-9.
- Ibáñez Acinas, Carla (2017). El actor Buenaventura Ibáñez (in Spanish). Bachelor's Degree Thesis in Audiovisual Communication defended at Nebrija University. Archived from the original on 2017-12-15.
- Ibáñez Acinas, Carla (2018). "Bonaventura Ibáñez Pallarés". Diccionario Biográfico Español (in Spanish). Real Academia de la Historia. Archived from the original on 23 July 2018.
