= The Five Cents of Lavarede (1927 film) =

1927 film

- Directed by: Maurice Champreux
- Written by: Henri Chabrillat; Paul d'Ivoi; Arthur Bernède
- Starring: Georges Biscot; Janine Liézer; Paulette Berger
- Cinematography: Gaston Grimault; Léon Morizet
- Production companies: Films Luminor; Société des Cinéromans
- Distributed by: Pathé Consortium Cinéma
- Release date: 14 October 1927
- Country: France
- Languages: Silent; French intertitles

The Five Cents of Lavarede (French:Les cinq sous de Lavarède) is a 1927 French silent adventure film directed by Maurice Champreux and starring Georges Biscot, Janine Liézer and Paulette Berger.

== Cast ==
- Georges Biscot as Armand Lavarède
- Janine Liézer as Miss Aurett Murlyton
- Paulette Berger as Martine Binguett
- Carlos Avril as Prosper Bouvreuil
- Anna Lefeuvrier as Pénélope Bouvreuil
- Jean-David Évremond as Jack Murlyton
- Léon Courtois

== Bibliography ==
- Goble, Alan. The Complete Index to Literary Sources in Film. Walter de Gruyter, 1999.
