= Hugues de Bagratide =

French actor

- Born: Bayazad Haïgazoun Bey Bagratide; 27 December 1890; Constantinople, Ottoman Empire
- Died: 19 December 1960 (aged 69); Paris, France
- Other name: Bayazad
- Occupation: Actor
- Years active: 1923-1956 (film)

Hugues de Bagratide (27 December 1890 – 19 December 1960) was a stage and film actor. Born in Constantinople of Armenian descent, he spent his working life in France. Because of his ethnic background he was cast in a variety of non-European roles. He appeared as judges and public officials, of both clearly different ethnicities and non-defined ones as well.

== Biography ==
Hugues de Bagratide was born on December 27, 1890, in Constantinople. He was of Armenian descent.

== Selected filmography ==
- Mandrin (1924)
- Princess Masha (1927)
- In Old Stamboul (1928)
- Sidonie Panache (1934)
- The New Men (1936)
- The Phantom Gondola (1936)
- The Lover of Madame Vidal (1936)
- Men of Prey (1937)
- Captain Benoit (1938)
- The Two Schemers (1938)
- The Postmaster's Daughter (1938)
- The Five Cents of Lavarede (1939)
- Deputy Eusèbe (1939)
- Miquette (1940)
- Death on the Run (1954)

== Bibliography ==
- Klossner, Michael. The Europe of 1500-1815 on Film and Television: A Worldwide Filmography of Over 2550 Works, 1895 Through 2000. McFarland & Company, 2002.
