= Mandrin (1924 film) =

1924 film

- Directed by: Henri Fescourt
- Written by: Arthur Bernède
- Produced by: Jean Sapene
- Starring: Romuald Joubé; Johanna Sutter; Hugues de Bagratide
- Cinematography: Jean Bachelet; Willy Faktorovitch; René Gaveau; Karémine Mérobian
- Edited by: Jean-Louis Bouquet
- Production company: Société des Cinéromans
- Distributed by: Pathé Consortium Cinéma
- Release date: 15 February 1924
- Country: France
- Languages: Silent; French intertitles

Mandrin is a 1924 French silent historical adventure film directed by Henri Fescourt and starring Romuald Joubé, Johanna Sutter and Hugues de Bagratide. It is based on the life of the eighteenth century brigand Louis Mandrin.

== Cast ==
- Romuald Joubé as Mandrin
- Johanna Sutter as Tiennot
- Hugues de Bagratide as Pistolet
- Louis Monfils as De Malicet
- Jacqueline Blanc as Nicole Malicet
- Madame Ahnar as Mme Malicet
- Jeanne Helbling as Mme de Pompadour
- Charles Leclerc as D'Argenson
- Gilbert Dalleu as De la Morlière
- Andrée Valois as Martine
- Marcelle Rahna as La Camargo
- Paul Guidé as Bouret d'Erigny
- Émile Saint-Ober as Mi-Carême
- Paul Bernier as Carnaval
- Bardès as Voltaire

== See also ==
- Mandrin (1947)
- Mandrin (1962)

== Bibliography ==
- Oscherwitz, Dayna & Higgins, MaryEllen. The A to Z of French Cinema. Scarecrow Press, 2009.
