= Lucien Dalsace =

French actor

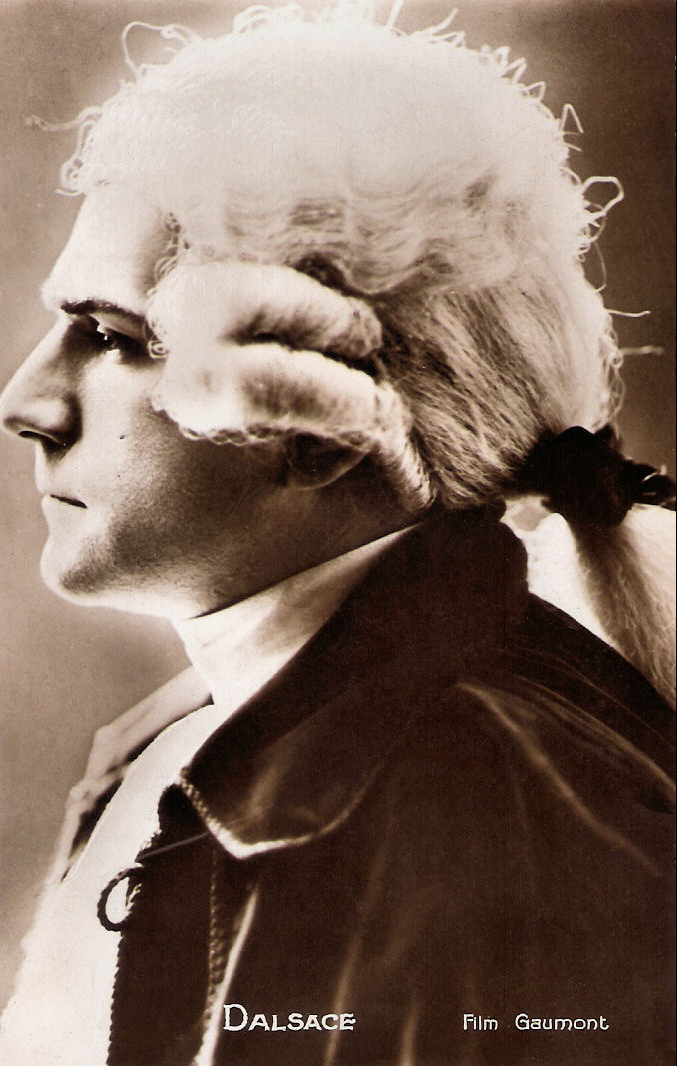
- Lucien Dalsace dans Vindicta.
- Born: 14 January 1893; Chatou, Yvelines, France
- Died: 30 July 1980 (aged 87); L'Haÿ-les-Roses, Val-de-Marne, France
- Other name: Gustave Louis Chalot
- Occupation: Actor
- Years active: 1921-1942 (film )

Lucien Dalsace (14 January 1893 – 30 July 1980) was a French film actor.

== Selected filmography ==
- Ferragus (1923)
- Prince Jean (1928)
- In Old Stamboul (1928)
- Temptation (1929)
- Chéri-Bibi (1938)
- The Rebel (1938)
- Immediate Call (1939)
- White Patrol (1942)

== Bibliography ==
- Goble, Alan. The Complete Index to Literary Sources in Film. Walter de Gruyter, 1999.
