= The Unknown Dancer =

1929 film

- Directed by: René Barberis
- Production companies: Films de France; Société des Cinéromans
- Distributed by: Pathé Consortium Cinéma
- Release date: 29 November 1929
- Country: France
- Languages: Silent; French intertitles

The Unknown Dancer (French: Le danseur inconnu) is a 1929 French silent film directed by René Barberis and starring Véra Flory, André Nicolle and André Roanne. It is based on a play by Tristan Bernard.

== Cast ==
- Véra Flory as Louise
- André Nicolle as Balthazar
- André Roanne as Henri Calvel
- Janet Young as Bertha
- Maryanne as Mme. Edmond
- Paul Ollivier as Gonthier
- Georges Herric as Herbert
- Labusquière as Gonzales
- Jean Godard as Thiraudel
- Charles Frank as Berthier
- Albert Broquin as Remy
- Major Heitner as Vieux Monsieur

== Bibliography ==
- Philippe Rège. Encyclopedia of French Film Directors, Volume 1. Scarecrow Press, 2009.
