= The Vein =

1928 film

- Directed by: René Barberis
- Production company: Société des Cinéromans
- Release date: 23 November 1928
- Country: France
- Languages: Silent; French intertitles

The Vein (French: La veine) is a 1928 French silent comedy film directed by René Barberis and starring Sandra Milovanoff and Rolla Norman.

== Cast ==
- Sandra Milovanoff as Charlotte Lagnier
- Rolla Norman as Julien Bréard
- Paulette Berger as Josephine Doblet
- André Nicolle as Edmond Tourneur
- Jules Moy as Chantereau
- Elmire Vautier as Simone Bauduin
- Eliane Tayar as La soubrette

== Bibliography ==
- Philippe Rège. Encyclopedia of French Film Directors, Volume 1. Scarecrow Press, 2009.
