= André Nicolle =

French actor

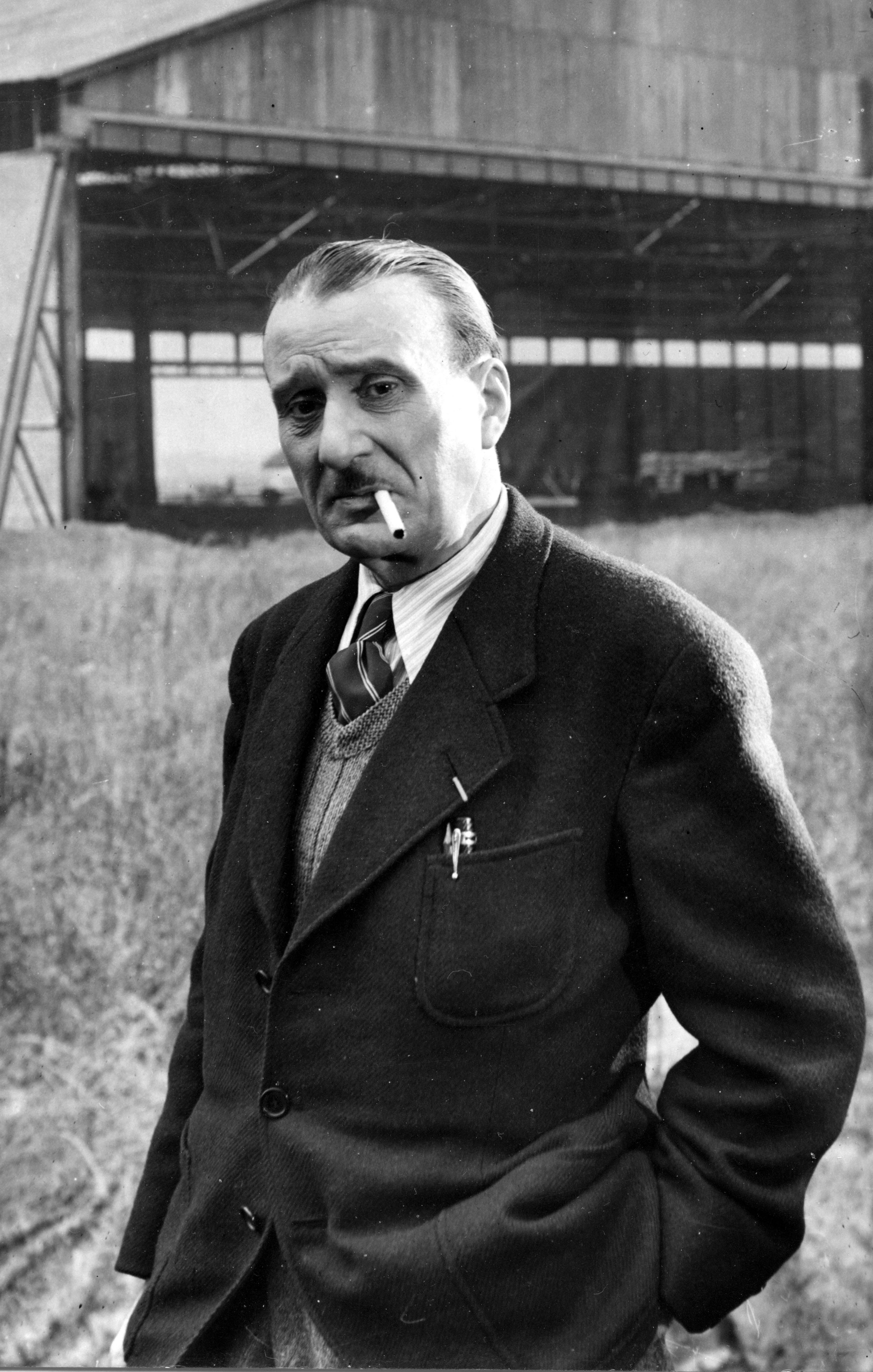
- Portrait of André Nicolle
- Born: 1 June 1885; Paris, France
- Died: 25 February 1945 (aged 59); Paris, France
- Occupation: Actor
- Years active: 1927-1945 (film)

André Nicolle (1 June 1885 – 25 February 1945) was a French film actor.

== Selected filmography ==
- The Chocolate Girl (1927)
- Karina the Dancer (1928)
- The Vein (1928)
- Temptation (1929)
- The Unknown Dancer (1929)
- Miss Europe (1930)
- Accused, Stand Up! (1930)
- Once Upon a Time (1933)
- Goodbye, Beautiful Days (1933)
- The Scandal (1934)
- Skylark (1934)
- The Girls of the Rhône (1938)
- Personal Column (1939)
- Whirlwind of Paris (1939)
- Beating Heart (1940)
- White Wings (1943)
- Mermoz (1943)
- A Cage of Nightingales (1945)

== Bibliography ==
- Phillips, Alastair. City of Darkness, City of Light: Émigré Filmmakers in Paris, 1929-1939. Amsterdam University Press, 2004.
