= In Old Stamboul =

1928 film

- Directed by: Roger Goupillières
- Written by: Jean-Louis Bouquet; Roger Goupillières
- Based on: Jalma La Double by Paul d'Ivoi
- Starring: Hugues de Bagratide; Acho Chakatouny; Lucien Dalsace
- Cinematography: Nicolas Bourgassoff; Georges Daret
- Production company: Société des Cinéromans
- Distributed by: Pathé Consortium Cinéma
- Release date: 1 February 1928
- Country: France
- Languages: Silent; French intertitles

In Old Stamboul (French: Jalma La Double) is a 1928 French silent adventure film directed by Roger Goupillières and starring Hugues de Bagratide, Acho Chakatouny and Lucien Dalsace. It is based on a novel of the same title by Paul d'Ivoi.

== Cast ==
- Hugues de Bagratide as Abdul-Hamid
- Acho Chakatouny as Le colonel Yerba
- Brindusa Grozavescu as Jalma
- Huguette Hefti as L'autre Jalma
- Lucien Dalsace as Jean-Paul Renaud
- Burhanneddin as Mourad V
- Raoul Chennevières as Ali
- Georges Deneubourg as Le vice-consul
- Marcel Lesieur as Moukdar
- Émile Mylo as Malouk
- Georges Tourreil as Alcide Malaric

== Bibliography ==
- Goble, Alan. The Complete Index to Literary Sources in Film. Walter de Gruyter, 1999.
- Rège, Philippe. Encyclopedia of French Film Directors, Volume 1. Scarecrow Press, 2009.
