= Chotard and Company =

1933 film directed by Jean Renoir

- Directed by: Jean Renoir
- Screenplay by: Roger Ferdinand
- Based on: Chotard et cie by Roger Ferdinand
- Produced by: Roger Ferdinand
- Starring: Jeanne Boitel; Fernand Charpin; Jeanne Loury
- Cinematography: Joseph-Louis Mundwiller
- Edited by: Marguerite Renoir
- Production company: Les Films Roger Ferdinand
- Distributed by: Universal Film S.A.
- Release date: 23 June 1933
- Running time: 83 minutes
- Country: France
- Language: French

Chotard and Company (French: Chotard et Cie) is a 1933 French comedy film directed by Jean Renoir and starring Jeanne Boitel, Fernand Charpin and Jeanne Loury. It was released by the French subsidiary of Universal Pictures.

== Cast ==
- Jeanne Boitel as Reine
- Fernand Charpin as Chotard
- Georges Pomiès as Julien Collinet
- Jeanne Loury as Marie Chotard
- Tré-Ki as Augustine
- Dignimont as Parpaillon
- Louis Seigner as Ducasse, le capitaine
- Louis Tunc as Le sous-préfet
- Max Dalban as Le commis
- Robert Seller as Le commandant
- René Arzic
- Jacques Becker
- Georges D'Arnoux as Un employé de l'épicerie
- Freddie Johnson as Le musicien
- Fabien Loris as Un invité du bal

== Bibliography ==
- Christopher Faulkner. The Social Cinema of Jean Renoir. Princeton University Press, 2014.
