= Acho Chakatouny =

Armenian actor

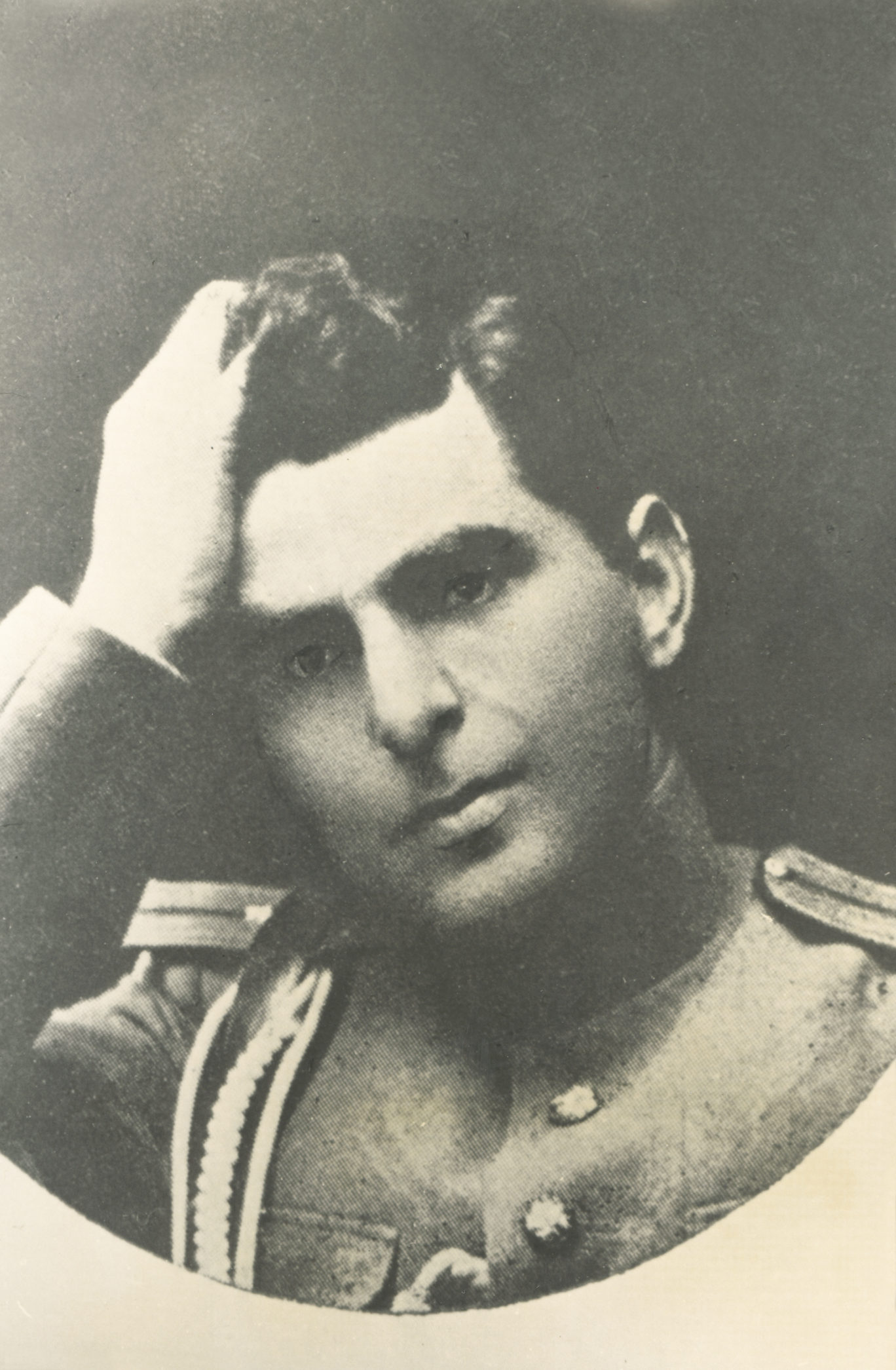
- Born: 1885; Gyumri Russian Empire
- Died: 4 April 1957 (aged 71–72); Paris, France
- Occupations: Actor, Makeup artist
- Years active: 1929–1947 (film)

Acho Chakatouny (Armenian: Արշաւիր Շահխաթունի) (1885–1957) was an Armenian actor, film director and makeup artist associated with the silent era. Chakatouny was born in Gyumri, then part of the Russian Empire. Following the Russian Revolution of 1917 he fled into exile, and settled in France.

== Selected filmography ==
- The Man with the Hispano (1926)
- Michel Strogoff (1926)
- Napoleon (1927)
- In Old Stamboul (1928)
- The White Devil (1930)
- The Lady of Lebanon (1934)

== Bibliography ==
- Michelangelo Capua. Anatole Litvak: The Life and Films. McFarland, 2015.
