= Temptation (1929 film) =

1929 film

- Directed by: René Barberis; René Leprince
- Written by: Jean-Louis Bouquet; Charles Méré (play)
- Produced by: Jacques de Baroncelli
- Starring: Lucien Dalsace; Clara Darcey-Roche; Fernand Mailly
- Cinematography: Louis Chaix
- Production companies: Films de France; Société des Cinéromans
- Distributed by: Pathé Consortium Cinéma
- Release date: 23 August 1929
- Country: France
- Languages: Silent; French intertitles

Temptation (French: La tentation) is a 1929 French silent film directed by René Barberis and René Leprince and starring Lucien Dalsace, Clara Darcey-Roche and Fernand Mailly.

== Cast ==
- Lucien Dalsace as Maître Robert Jourdan
- Clara Darcey-Roche as La maman
- Fernand Mailly as Monsieur de Bergue
- André Nicolle as Lutard
- Jean Peyrière as Maurice Brinon
- Elmire Vautier as Madame Alfieri
- Claudia Victrix as Irène de Bergue

== Bibliography ==
- Philippe Rège. Encyclopedia of French Film Directors, Volume 1. Scarecrow Press, 2009.
