= Colette the Unwanted =

1927 film

- Directed by: René Barberis
- Written by: Henri Fescourt
- Cinematography: Georges Daret; Georges Lafont; Karémine Mérobian
- Production companies: Films de France; Société des Cinéromans
- Distributed by: Pathé Consortium Cinéma
- Release date: 18 March 1927
- Country: France
- Languages: Silent; French intertitles

Colette the Unwanted (French: Les larmes de Colette) is a 1927 French silent film directed by René Barberis.

== Cast ==
- André Rolane as Colette
- Marcelle Barry as L'institutrice
- Renée Carl as Madame Lapierre
- Olga Day as Madame Duboin-Larbeuil
- Gisele Joly as Simone
- Paul Jorge as Le grand-père
- Louisette Malapert as Giselle Lapierre
- Daniel Mendaille as Le père Duboin-Larbeuil
- Sandra Milovanoff as Marie
- Georges Saillard as Le notaire

== Bibliography ==
- Philippe Rège. Encyclopedia of French Film Directors, Volume 1. Scarecrow Press, 2009.
