= Aimée Campton =

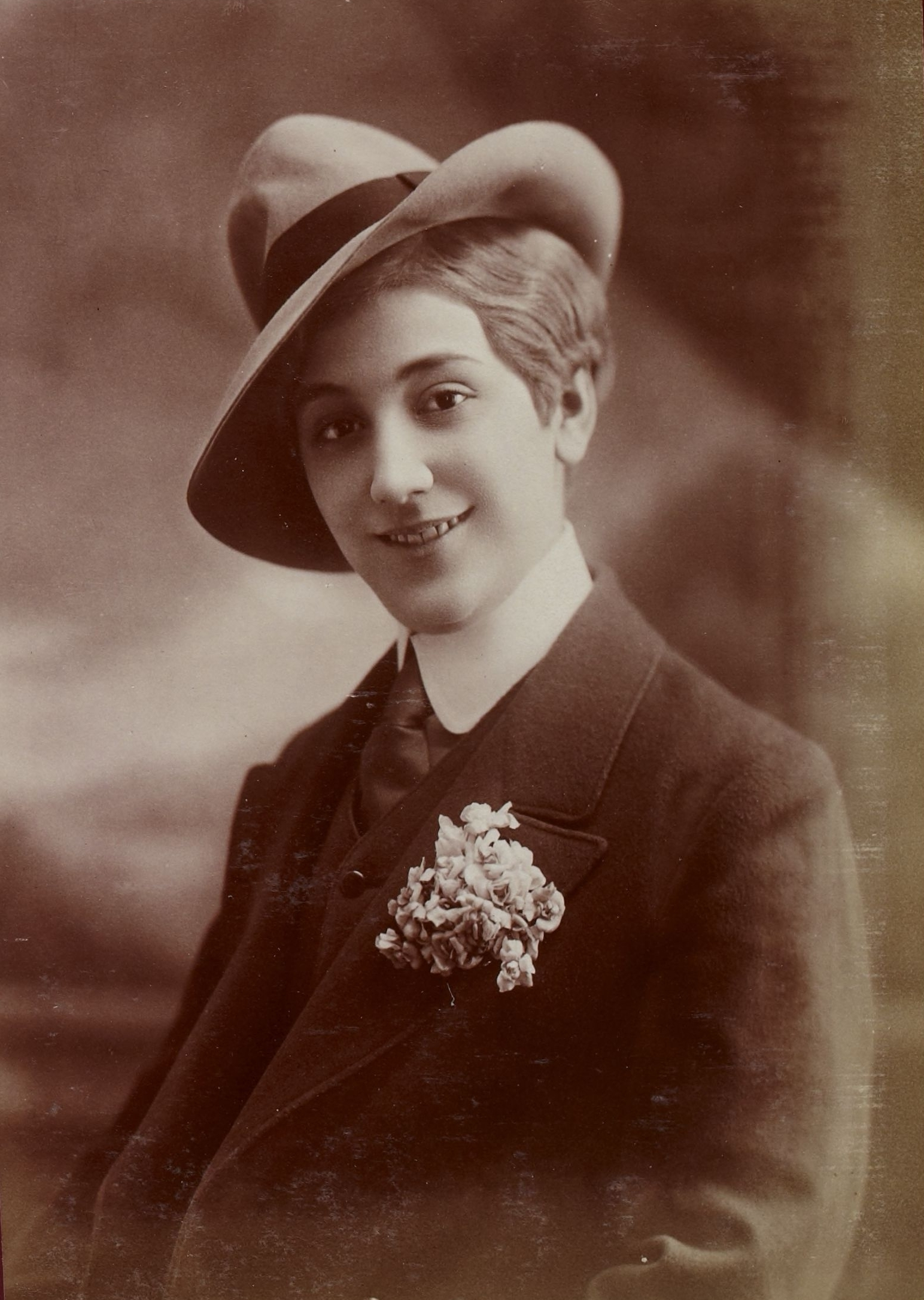
Aimée Campton c.1905

Aimée Campton or Miss Campton (6 April 1882 – 21 November 1930) was a dancer, music hall artist, postcard beauty and a French actress of English origin. A silent film actress, she played the lead role in a series of French-made Maud films in the 1910s.

== Biography ==
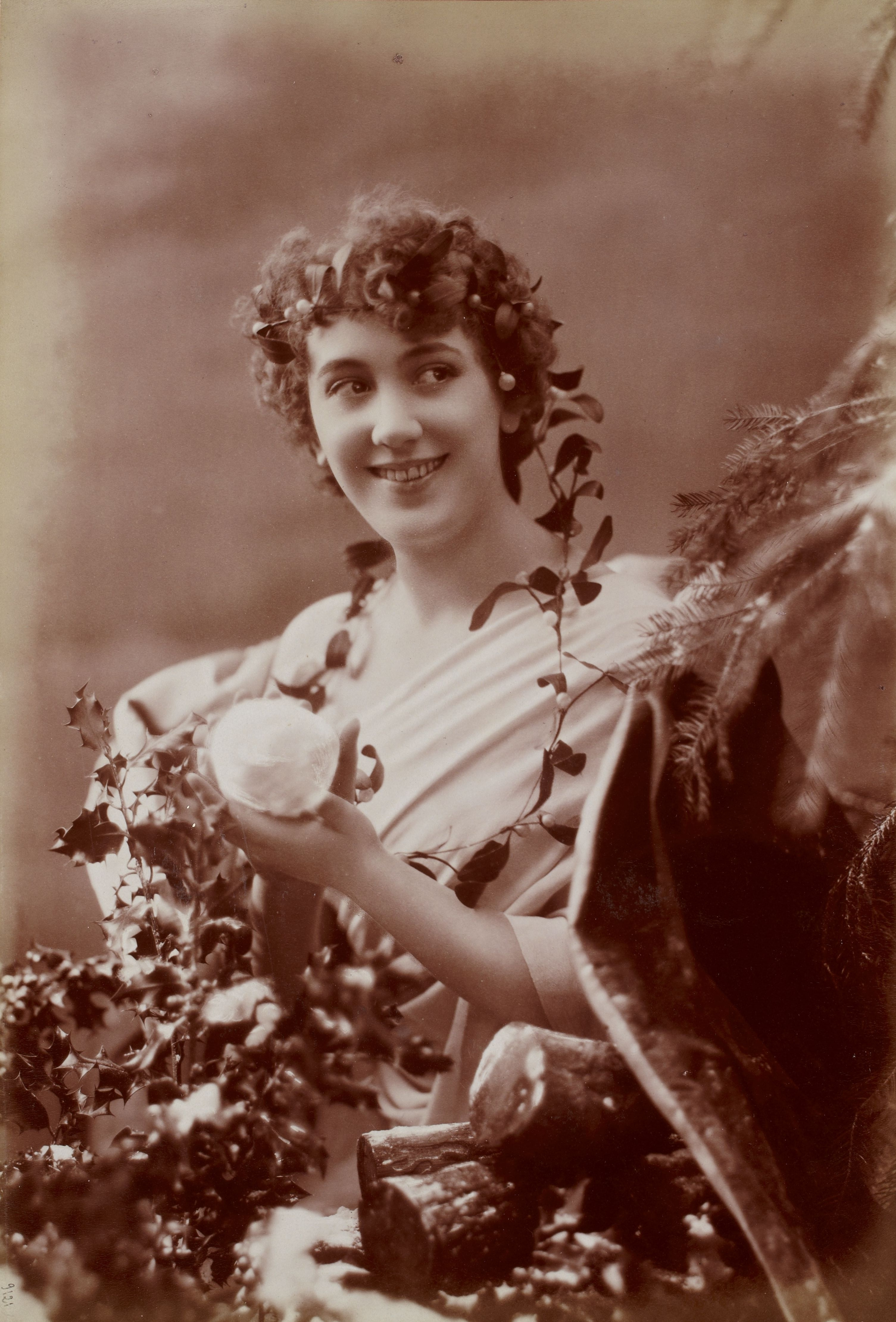
Aimée Campton in about 1910

Born in Brighton in 1882 as Emily Strahan Cager, the illegitimate daughter of domestic servant Emily Cager and raised in London, she arrived as a dancer in one of the first of Tiller Girls troupes to visit Paris at the time of the Exposition Universelle of 1900 and would never leave again. Her lively on-stage character and English accent while speaking French greatly amused audiences at the Folies Bergère. She adopted the stage name Aimée Campton and met the actor Charles Prince (real name Charles Ernest René Petitdemange) whom she married in Paris on 20 December 1900. Less than two months later in February 1901 their only daughter Renée Petitdemange (1901-1993) was born. The couple divorced in April 1905.

Campton appeared in a number of 'breeches roles', including in the revue Entente Cordiale (1905) by Robert de Flers, in which she played a British Lord opposite Mlle Marie Marville as Madame de France at the Théâtre des Capucines. During 1904 to 1907 she was at the Moulin Rouge, in 1904 in the revue La Revue du Moulin with music by Gustave Goublier, and in 1907 in the operetta Le toreador. In 1906 she was in Une Revue au Palais-Royal, while in 1907 she acted in the comedy Souper d’Adieu at the Théâtre des Capucines. From 1907 to 1910 she was in the annual Folies Bergère revue by Flers. With Louis Maurel she sang 'Entrevue de Marienbad' at the Folies Bergère, which was recorded and which betrays her English accent while singing in French. In about 1908 Campton appeared in the revue Pomme d’amour while in 1911 she was at the Théâtre des Ambassadeurs. Between October 1911 and February 1912 she played alongside René Hervil the Théâtre des Capucines in Et voilà! by Robert Dieudonné and Gently! by Hugues Delorme. In the following year he would cast her as the lead in his Maud series of films. During 1911 to 1913 Campton was at La Cigale in La revue sans culotte (1911); the comedy Miss Alice des P.T.T. by Tristan Bernard (1912-1913) and in En scene... mon president (1913), both with Maurice Claudius as her on-stage partner. In 1913 she performed in revues at the Théâtre Marigny, including in La revue de Marigny by André Barde and Michel-Antoine Carré. From 1912 to 1915 she was on film sets for the studio Urban-Eclipse in Paris where she created the title role in the Maud series under the direction of René Hervil. Maud was one of the few comic series of the time in France to stage a female main character.

In 1917 Campton appeared in Ou Campe-t-on? at the Théâtre des Capucines in a revue the title of which was pun on her name, demonstrating her fame at this time. After World War I Campton's career began to fail. In 1921 she had a supporting role in the revue Ça va? at the Théâtre de Paris, while in 1922 she failed in the lead role in the revue Va l’dire à... Gênes! at La Cigale, with some critics believing her poor grasp of the French language had been an obstacle which audiences earlier in her career had found delightful. In 1923 she appeared in Blanc et Noir at the Théâtre des Variétés and in the same year at the same theatre she had a supporting part in Un Jour de Folie by André Birabeau. After these appearances she retired from the stage.

Sometime after her divorce from Charles Prince she married Paul Derval, director and owner of the Folies Bergère and appeared here regularly before gradually stopping performing on stage. It was at their home on rue Alphonse-de-Neuville in the 17th arrondissement of Paris that she died in 1930 at the age of 48 following a long illness with cancer.

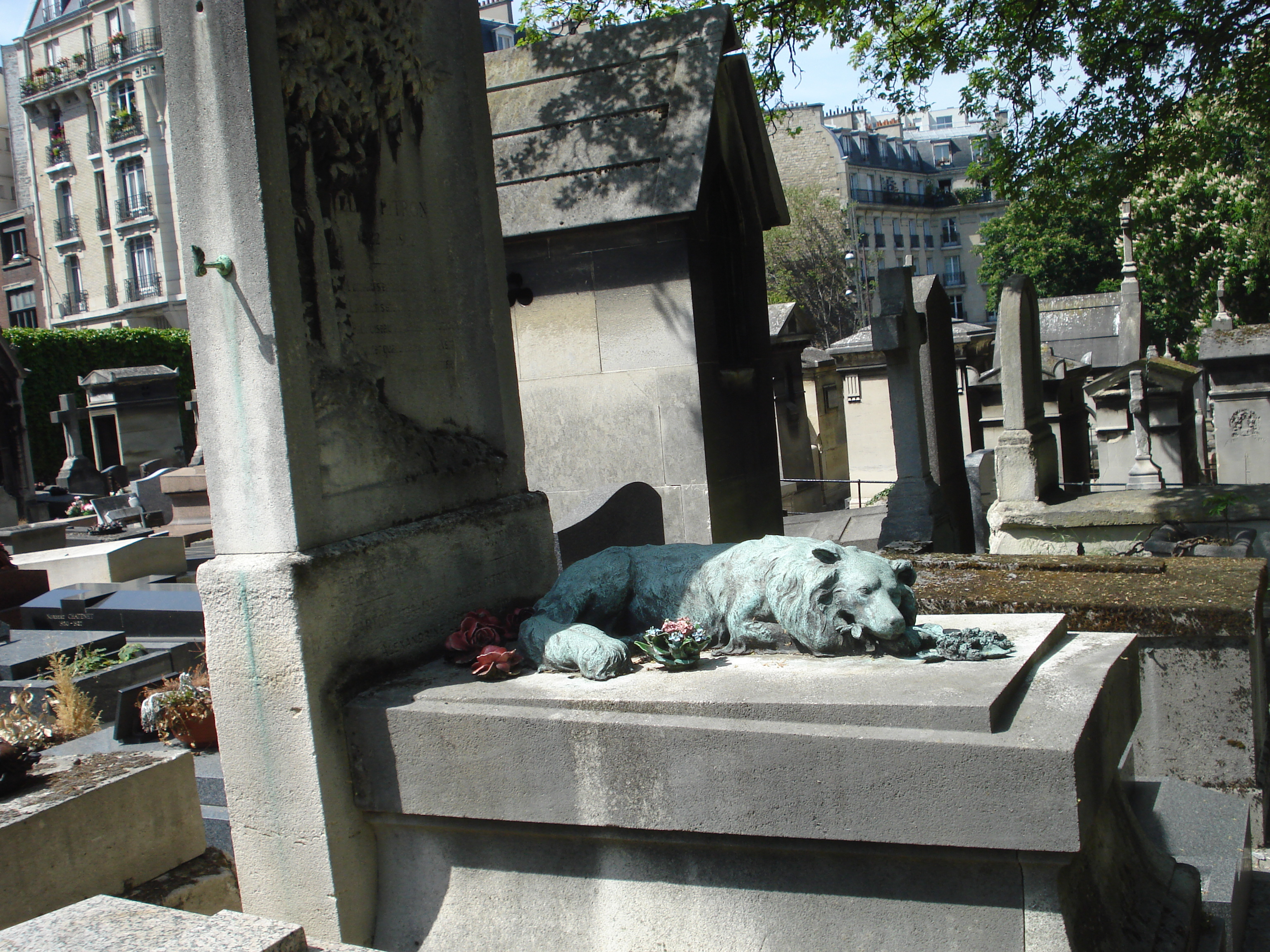
The shared grave of Aimée Campton in Montmartre Cemetery in Paris

Aimée Campton was buried on 25 November 1930 in the Derval family vault at Montmartre Cemetery, after a religious ceremony at the Church of St. Francis de Sales in Paris. In 1931 her jewels, furs, rings and string of 95 pearls were auctioned.

== Filmography ==
- 1912 : Le Charme de Maud, by René Hervil - Maud
- 1913 : Maud amoureuse, by René Hervil - Maud
- 1914 : Maud en culottes, with René Hervil - Maud
- 1914 : Maud en chiffons, with René Hervil - Maud
- 1914 : Maud clubman, with René Hervil - Maud
- 1914 : Le Gant de Maud, by René Hervil - Maud
- 1915 : Maud cambrioleur, by René Hervil - Maud
- 1915 : Maud professeur d’anglais, by René Hervil - Maud
- 1915 : Maud et Tante Zélie, with René Hervil - Maud
- 1916 : Maud amoureuse, with René Hervil - Maud
- 1916 : Anana secrétaire intime, by Maurice Poggi - Henriette

== Bibliography ==
- Raymond Chirat and Eric Le Roy, Catalogue des films français de fiction de 1908 à 1918, Paris, Cinémathèque française, 1995.
