= Jeanne Boitel =

French actress (1904–1987)

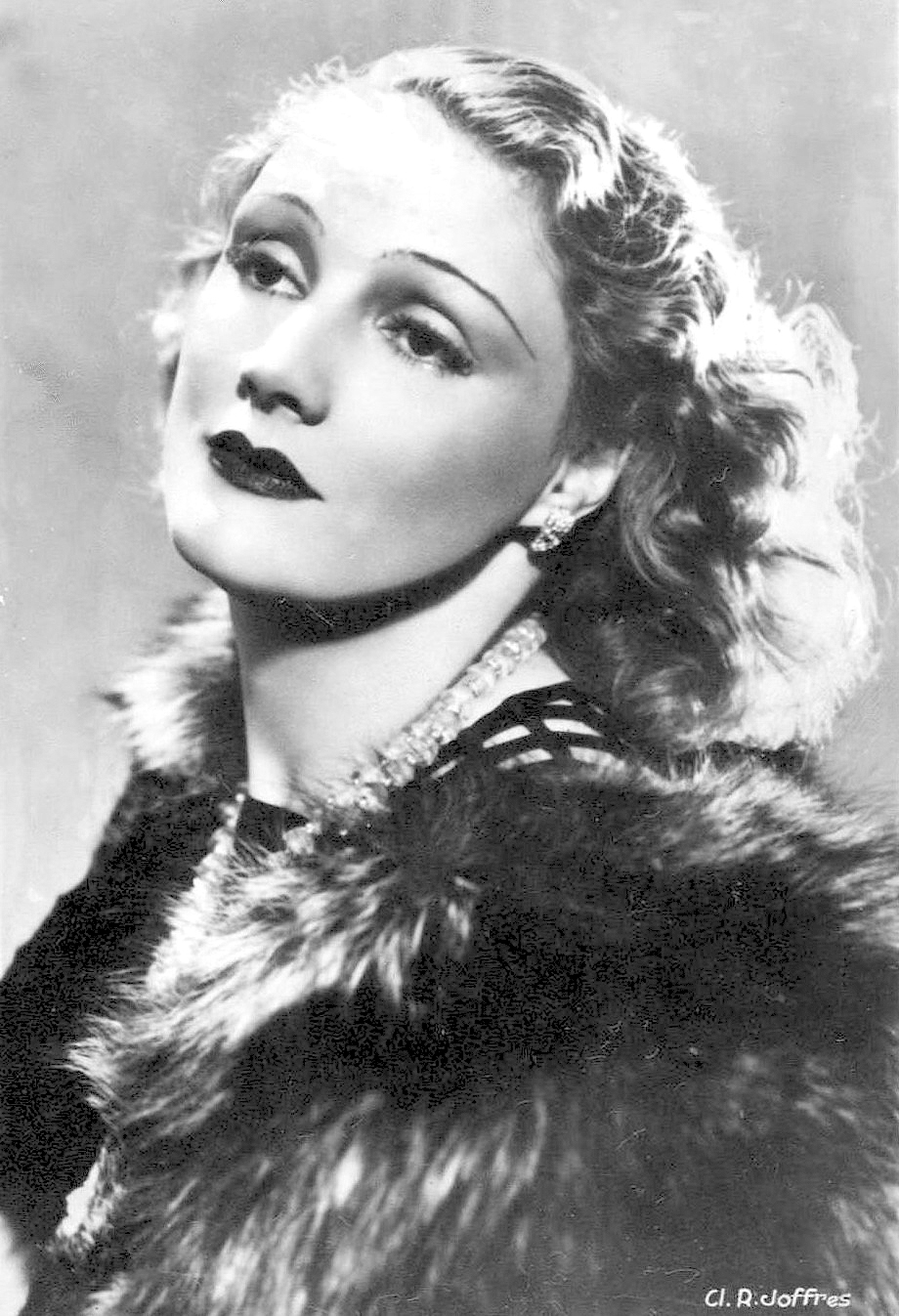
- Born: 4 January 1904; Paris, France
- Died: 7 August 1987 (aged 83); Paris, France
- Other name: Jeanne Marie Andrée Boitel
- Occupation: Actress
- Years active: 1931–1973 (film)
- Spouse: Jacques Jaujard

Jeanne Boitel (French pronunciation: [ʒan bwatɛl]; 4 January 1904 – 7 August 1987) was a French film actress. She played a role in the resistance during World War II, using the nickname Mozart. She met Jacques Jaujard during her resistance activities in the war, and married him.

After the war, she became a Sociétaire of the Comédie-Française from 1948 to 1973.

== Partial filmography ==
Year	Film	Role
1931	Un soir, au front	Marie-Anne Heller
1931	The Eaglet	La comtesse Camerata
1932	Amourous Adventure	Ève
1932	A Telephone Call	Germaine
1932	If You Wish It	Maryse
1932	L'affaire de la rue Mouffetard	
1932	Antoinette	Antoinette
1932	Maurin of the Moors	Madame Labarterie
1932	Le petit écart	Jacqueline Heller, sa femme
1933	Chotard and Company	Reine Chotard-Collinet
1933	Ah! Quelle gare!	Hélène
1933	Le grillon du foyer	Berthe
1934	His Other Love	Hélène
1934	Casanova	Anne Roman, Baronne de Meilly-Coulonge
1934	Famille nombreuse	Irène de Grange
1934	Trois pour cent	Christiane Barbouin
1935	Whirlpool	Jeanne Saint-Clair - the Wife
1935	Les dieux s'amusent	Alcmène
1937	Romarin	Olga
1937	Men of Prey	Michelle Korany
1937	Femmes	Irène
1938	Ceux de demain	Denise Vernot
1938	Véréna's Wedding	Véréna Rainer
1938	Remontons les Champs-Élysées	Madame de Pompadour
1939	Petite peste	Hélène Bertheron
1939	Une main a frappé	Simone
1954	Royal Affairs in Versailles	Madame de Sevigné
1955	Napoleon	Madame de Dino
1956	If Paris Were Told to Us	Mme Geoffrin / Sarah Bernhardt
1956	Marie Antoinette Queen of France	Mme. Campan
1957	Bonjour jeunesse	La mère de Liselette
1958	Maigret Sets a Trap	Louise Maigret

== Bibliography ==
- Macdonald, Nicholas (2013). In Search of La Grande Illusion: A Critical Appreciation of Jean Renoir's Elusive Masterpiece. McFarland. ISBN 978-0786462704.
- Terrenoire, Elisabeth (1946). Combattantes sans uniforme: Les femmes dans la résistance. Bloud et Gay.
