= Jean Vignaud =

French writer

- Born: 24 September 1875; Saintes, France
- Died: 11 February 1962 (aged 86); Nice, France
- Occupation: Writer

Jean Vignaud (1875–1962) was a French novelist. A handful of his works were adapted for cinema. Between 1936 and 1946 he served as president of the Société des gens de lettres. Vignaud was noted for his staunch support of France's presence in Algeria and other North African territories. One of his most notable works was his 1926 novel La Maison du Maltai, which was adapted into films twice for the 1928 silent film Karina the Dancer and the 1938 film Sirocco.

== Bibliography ==
- Crisp, Colin. French Cinema—A Critical Filmography: Volume 1, 1929-1939. Indiana University Press, 2015.
- Goble, Alan. The Complete Index to Literary Sources in Film. Walter de Gruyter, 1999.
- Kennedy-Karpat, Colleen. Rogues, Romance, and Exoticism in French Cinema of the 1930s. Fairleigh Dickinson, 2013.
