= Victims of Duty =

Victims of Duty (French: Victimes du Devoir) is a one-act play written in 1953 by French-Romanian playwright Eugène Ionesco. An early work, it has not received the notoriety of his other works. This play is in the Theatre of the Absurd style, of which Ionesco was a pioneer.

The play was first produced by Jaques Mauclair in February 1953 at the Théâtre du Quartier latin in Paris. The first English performance was produced by Alan Simpson at the Pike Theatre in Dublin, Ireland in October 1957.

== Plot ==
Choubert and Madeleine live a normal life together in their petit bourgeois flat in which "nothing ever happens." Choubert discusses an official announcement in the newspaper urging people of the big towns to cultivate detachment to conquer problems of existence and confusion of spirit. Then he discusses his fondness for the cinema and theatre. He complains there is nothing new to be done in theatre, and notes how all plays are the same, in particular how they're all thrillers.

CHOUBERT:

Drama's always been realistic and there's always been a detective about...
Every play's an investigation brought to a successful conclusion...
There's a riddle and it's solved in the final scene...
Sometimes earlier...you might as well give the game away at the start...

Unexpectedly, the Detective enters. He quizzes Choubert and Madeleine about the spelling of the name of the previous tenant of their flat. The Detective wants to know whether the name was spelt Mallot with a 't' at the end, or Mallot with a 'd'. Whilst Choubert knows the name and its spelling, he is confused as to whether he knew the Mallots themselves. The Detective relentlessly quizzes Choubert, eventually leading him on a journey into his own memory to reveal all he really knows about 'The Mallots'. The search, on the whole, seems fruitless. Choubert returns from his memory, arriving "back on the surface." The Detective says he has no choice but to force-feed Choubert a stale old crust of bread to help Choubert "plug the gaps in his memory," to help him remember everything about Mallot.

Two new characters arrive. The first is Lady. The other characters only address her in passing, soliciting her agreement to what they just said: "Isn't that right, Madame?" She sits, detached from the scene and silent—except when she informs the others she is not Madame, but Mademoiselle. The second character, Nicolas d'Eu—not to be confused with Nicholas II—is deeply philosophical. He stays until the end of the play, taking about ideas of "logic and contradiction." He becomes increasingly angry at the Detective's ideas and his force-feeding Choubert. The Detective realises Nicolas d'Eu is a threat and becomes petrified. Nicolas d'Eu pulls out a dagger and stabs the Detective three times, killing him. While being stabbed, the Detective utters three strange phrases:

DETECTIVE:

Long live the white race...
I should like a posthumous decoration...
I am ... a Victim ... of Duty...

Nicolas declares he will help find Mallot, and Madeleine vehemently agrees. Together they encourage Choubert to continue eating bread to plug the gaps in his memory. Choubert claims that he is a "...victim of Duty too!" Nicolas agrees and Madeleine tells us, "We are all Victims of Duty." The curtain falls as all the characters order each other to chew and swallow the bread. The Lady joins in.

== Autobiographical elements ==
This play was Ionesco's most biographical piece, as well as the favorite of his own plays. In Notes and Counternotes, he describes the process of writing this piece as "tearing at his entrails and making public all his deepest doubts and fears. The character Choubert's obsession with theatre, and a particular memory where he holds his mother's hand as he walks along the Rue Blomet after the bombing, suggest that he represents Ionesco. The extended dialogue with the detective as a father figure echoes Ionesco's constant fighting with his own father, and the scene wherein Madeline attempts to poison herself is referenced directly in Ionesco's journal Present Past Past Present as an incident that occurred in his childhood when his own mother attempted to poison herself to spite his father. Additionally, the character Nicolas d'Eu, who writes poems, exclaims he is "not a writer, and proud of it!" The Detective tells him, "Everyone ought to write," to which Nicolas responds, "No point. We've got Ionesco and Ionesco that's enough!"
