= Mauprat (film) =

1926 film directed by Jean Epstein

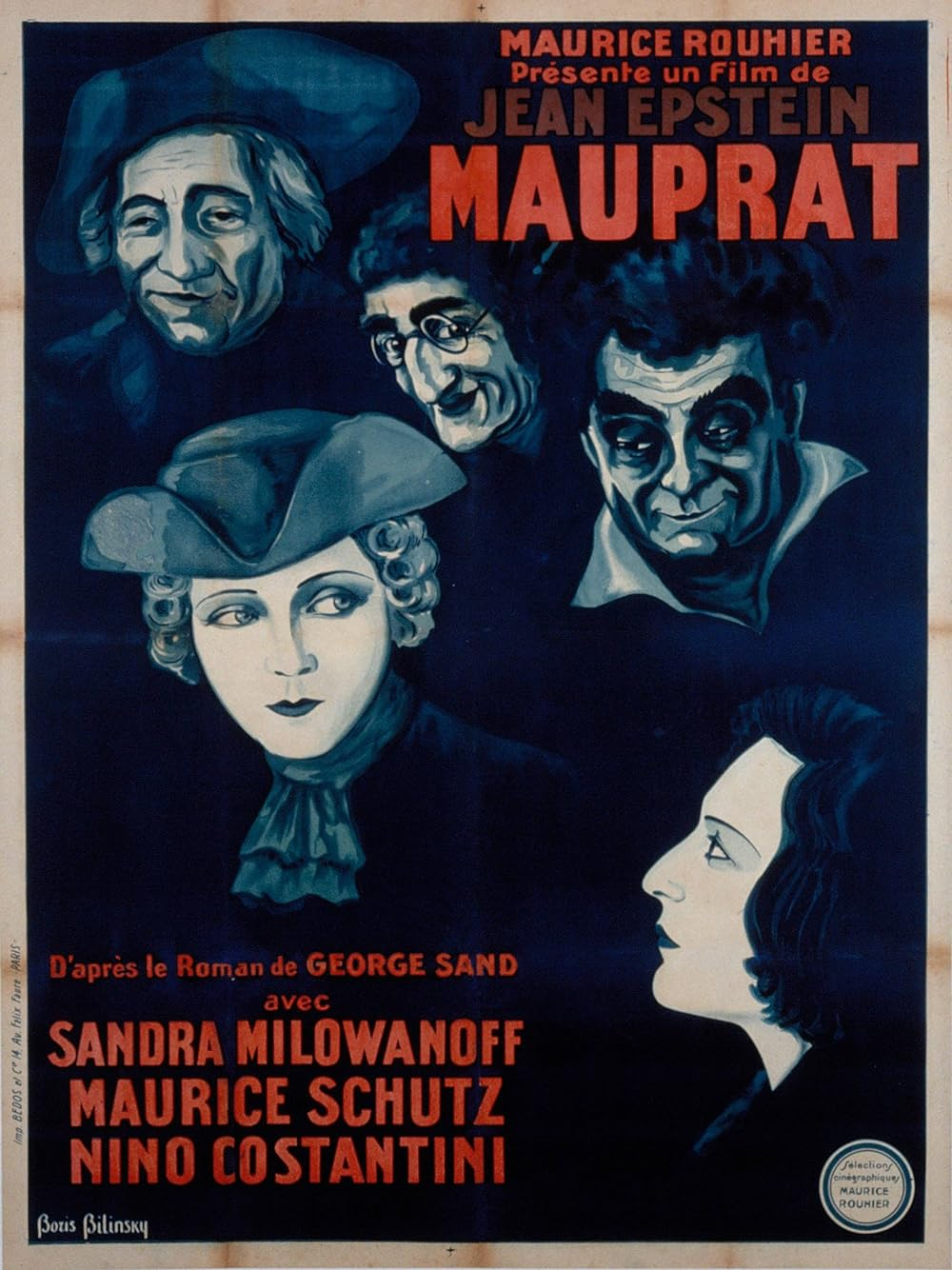
- Film poster
- Directed by: Jean Epstein
- Written by: Jean Epstein; George Sand (novel)
- Produced by: Jean Epstein
- Starring: Sandra Milovanoff; Maurice Schutz; René Ferté
- Cinematography: Albert Duverger
- Production company: Films Jean Epstein
- Release date: 19 October 1926
- Running time: 88 minutes
- Country: France
- Languages: Silent; French intertitles

Mauprat (1926) by Jean Epstein

Mauprat is a 1926 French silent drama film directed by Jean Epstein, based on the eponymous novel by George Sand. Luis Buñuel, who had enrolled in Epstein's acting school, was the production assistant and had a small acting role in the film.

== Cast ==
- Sandra Milovanoff – Edmée de Mauprat
- Maurice Schutz – Tristan de Mauprat / Hubert de Mauprat
- Nino Constantini – Bernard de Mauprat
- René Ferté – Monsieur de La Marche
- Alex Allin – Marcasse
- Halma – Jean de Mauprat
- Alexej Bondireff
- Luis Buñuel – Monk / Guardsman

== Production ==
Filming took place at the Château de Châteaubrun in Cuzion (Indre).
