= Sirocco (1938 film) =

1938 film

- Directed by: Pierre Chenal
- Written by: Jacques Companéez; Simon Gantillon; Pierre Chenal
- Based on: La maison du Maltais by Jean Vignaud
- Produced by: Bernard Natan; André Parant; Charles Smadja; Rodolphe Solmsen
- Starring: Viviane Romance; Louis Jouvet; Pierre Renoir; Marcel Dalio
- Cinematography: Curt Courant
- Edited by: Borys Lewin
- Music by: Mahieddine Bachtarzi; Jacques Ibert
- Production companies: Compagnie Cinématographique de France; Gladiator Films
- Distributed by: Compagnie Cinématographique de France
- Release date: 22 September 1938
- Running time: 90 minutes
- Country: France
- Language: French

Sirocco or The Maltese House (French: La maison du Maltais) is a 1938 French drama film directed by Pierre Chenal and starring Viviane Romance, Louis Jouvet, Pierre Renoir and Marcel Dalio. It was shot at the Saint-Maurice Studios in Paris. The film's sets were designed by the art director Georges Wakhévitch. It is an adaptation of a novel by Jean Vignaud, which had previously been made into the 1928 silent film Karina the Dancer, but made significant changed to the plot. It has been categorised as a film noir.

== Synopsis ==
In the Tunisian port city of Sfax, the half Maltese Matteo meets and falls in love with Safia a prostitute. Finding herself pregnant when he is wrongly believed to have vanished at sea, she heads to Paris in the company of an archaeologist André Chervin to be his wife. Three years later Matteo arrives in Paris, but his efforts to reclaim her love are thwarted by a number of obstacles thrown in his way. These partly come from a blackmailing private detective Rossignol who Safia who had once hired to find out about Matteo, but is now threatening to expose her past. Ultimately seeing the life that Chervin can offer their young daughter, Matteo makes the self-sacrificing decision not to interfere.

== Cast ==
- Viviane Romance as Safia
- Louis Jouvet as Rossignol
- Pierre Renoir as L'archéologue André Chervin
- Jany Holt as Greta
- Marcel Dalio as Matteo Gordina - le Maltais
- Gina Manès as Olga
- Fréhel as Rosina
- Jean Davy as Un ami de Chervin
- Max Dalban as Jules - un ami de Chervin
- Pierre Labry as Le chef de la bande
- Gaston Modot as Le soutier
- Martial Rèbe as Ibrahim le Maltais
- André Gabriello as L'homme volé
- Nina Myral as L'épouse du collectionneur
- Sinoël as Antonin Robillard
- Florence Marly as Diana
- Raymond Aimos as Gégène
- Jacques Erwin as Laurent
- Georges Paulais as Le barman
- Edmond Beauchamp as Le policier
- Anthony Gildès as Un archéologue
- Marguerite de Morlaye as Une invitée
- Robert Moor as Le domestique de Chervin
- Yvonne Yma as La femme qui fait des robes

== Bibliography ==
- Goble, Alan. The Complete Index to Literary Sources in Film. Walter de Gruyter, 1999.
- Kennedy-Karpat, Colleen. Rogues, Romance, and Exoticism in French Cinema of the 1930s. Fairleigh Dickinson, 2013.
- Spicer, Andrew. Historical Dictionary of Film Noir. Scarecrow Press, 2010.
- Walker-Morrison, Deborah. Classic French Noir: Gender and the Cinema of Fatal Desire. Bloomsbury Publishing, 2020.
