= Jean-Louis Bouquet =

French screenwriter

- Born: 26 August 1900; Paris, France
- Died: 15 July 1978 (aged 77); Paris, France
- Occupations: Writer, Editor, Director
- Years active: 1920-1951 (film)

Jean-Louis Bouquet (1900–1978) was a French screenwriter. He also edited and directed some films.

== Selected filmography ==
- The City Destroyed (1924)
- Mandrin (1924)
- In Old Stamboul (1928)
- Temptation (1929)
- The Best Mistress (1929)
- The Heir of the Bal Tabarin (1933)
- The Surprises of Divorce (1933)
- The Darling of His Concierge (1934)
- The Drunkard (1937)
- Golden Venus (1938)
- The Five Cents of Lavarede (1939)
- Private Life (1942)
- Fantômas (1946)

== Bibliography ==
- Lee Grieveson & Peter Kramer. The Silent Cinema Reader. Psychology Press, 2004.
