= Théâtre du Quartier latin =

Entertainment venue in France

Coordinates: 48.8495°N 2.3429°E

The théâtre du Quartier latin (French pronunciation: [teɑtʁ dy kaʁtje latɛ̃]) is a former Parisian entertainment venue which was located 9 rue Champollion in the 5th arrondissement of Paris (Latin Quarter) and directed by Michel de Ré until 1956.

== Repertoire ==
- 1951 : Mi-figue, mi-raisin by Jean Tardieu, directed by Michel de Ré
- 1951 : Treize pièces à louer 13 courtes pièces, directed by Michel de Ré (24 avril)
  - Opéra biographique by François Billetdoux
  - Le Grand Comédien by Guillaume Hanoteau
  - Les Temps faciles by Steve Passeur
  - La Postérité by Guillaume Hanoteau
  - À la chasse comme à la chasse by François Billetdoux
  - Les Erreurs by Jean Tardieu
  - Oswald et Zenaïde by Jean Tardieu
  - La Vue noire by Guillaume Hanoteau
  - L'Ecole des femmes by Pierre Devaux
  - Ce que parler veut dire by Jean Tardieu
  - Incognito, songs by Roland Dubillard
  - Réflexion faite by Steve Passeur
  - La Maison des confidences by Henri Duvernois
- 1951 : La Reine Mère ou les Valois terribles, opéra bouffe by Pierre Devaux, music Georges Van Parys (31 October)
- 1952 : L'Amour en papier by Louis Ducreux and Le Jardin du Roi by Pierre Devaux, directed by Michel de Ré (10 March)
- 1953 : Sens interdit by Armand Salacrou, Sisyphe et la Mort by Robert Merle and Les Amitiés dangereuses by Maurice Tillet and André Salvet, directed by Michel de Ré (9 January)
- 1953 : Victims of Duty by Eugène Ionesco, directed by Jacques Mauclair (26 February)
- 1953 : Musique pour sourds by Charles Spaak, 26 February
- 1953 : Actes de grâce, show in three plays, directed by Michel de Ré (7 May)
  - Les Aveux les plus doux by Georges Arnaud
  - Fraternité by Fernand Fleuret and Georges Girard
  - La Tête des autres by Marcel Aymé
- 1953 : La Reine Mère or Pas un mot à la Reine Mère, opéra-bouffe by Pierre Devaux, music Georges Van Parys
- 1954 : La Tour Eiffel qui tue by Guillaume Hanoteau, directed by Michel de Ré (4 May)
- 1954 : La Bande à Bonnot by Henri-François Rey, directed by Michel de Ré (17 December)
