= Mauprat (novel) =

1837 novel by George Sand

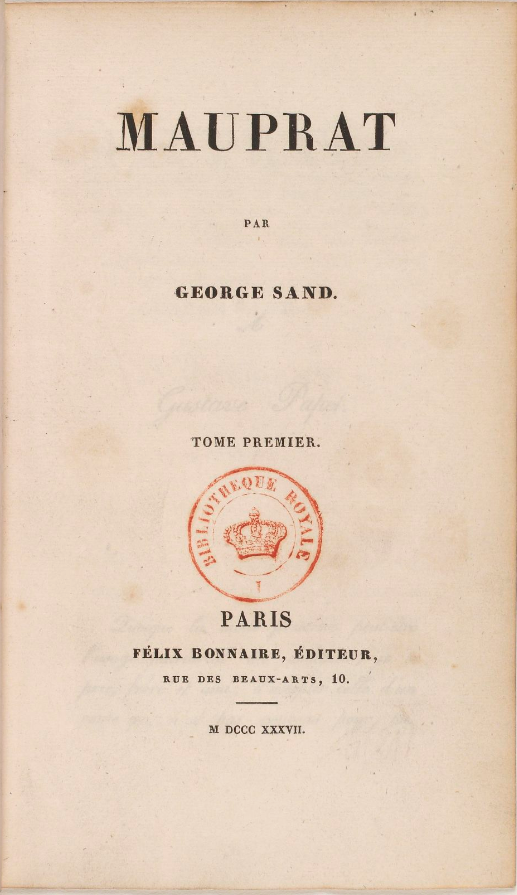
- Title page from the first edition
- Author: George Sand
- Language: French
- Genre: Romantic
- Publication date: 1837
- Publication place: France

Mauprat is a novel about love and education by the French novelist George Sand. It was published in serial form in the French literary magazine Revue des deux Mondes from April to June 1837. Like many of Sand's novels, Mauprat borrows from various fictional genres: the Gothic novel, chivalric romance, the Bildungsroman, detective fiction, and the historical novel.

== Plot summary ==
The novel's plot has been called a plot of female socialization, in which the hero is taught by the heroine how to live peacefully in society. Mauprat resembles the fairy tale Beauty and the Beast. As this would suggest, the novel is a romance. However, Sand resists the immediate happy ending of marriage between the two main characters in favor of a more gradual story of education, including a reappraisal of the passive female role in courtship and marriage. Sand also calls into question Rousseau's ideal version of the female education as described in his novel Emile, namely, training women for domesticity and the home.

The novel, set before the French Revolution, depicts the coming of age of a nobleman named Bernard Mauprat. The story is narrated by the old Bernard in his country home many years later, as told to a nameless young male visitor. Bernard recounts how, raised by a violent gang of his feudal kinsmen after the death of his mother, he becomes a brutalized "enfant sauvage". When his cousin Edmée is held captive by Bernard's "family", he helps her escape, but elicits a promise of marriage from her by threatening rape. Thus begins the long courtship of Bernard and Edmée. The novel ends with a dramatic trial scene, similar to that in Stendhal's The Red and the Black, albeit with a more positive ending of Bernard being exonerated and Edmée publicly professing her love for Bernard.

During the period Sand wrote the novel, she was gradually becoming more interested in the problem of political equality in society. She had read widely about the views of socialist thinkers such as Pierre Leroux, with whom she went on to form a journal, the Revue Indépendante. In keeping with Sand's interest in equality, Mauprat depicts a new type of literary figure, the peasant visionary Patience. In addition, part of the novel takes place during the American Revolutionary War.

== Publication history ==
Mauprat was serialized in four parts in the French literary magazine Revue des deux Mondes from April to June 1837. It was published as a two-volume collected edition by Félix Bonnaire in August of the same year. The novel has been translated into English several times, including translations by Matilda M. Hays in 1847, Virginia Vaughan in 1870, Henrietta E. Miller in 1891, Stanley Young in 1902, and Sylvia Raphael in 1997.

== Reception and legacy ==
American author Henry James called Mauprat a "solid, masterly, manly book".

Russian literary critic Vissarion Belinsky praised the novel for its "profound and poetic idea, that of a strong, intelligent, beautiful woman raising a man above his bestial passions". According to Columbia University's Lesley Singer Herrmann, Belinsky's opinion of Mauprat "set the tone for Sand's reception in Russia in the 1840s and 50s, where she was proclaimed the 'advocate of women as Schiller had been the advocate of humanity.'"

The French women's magazine Elle similarly hailed Mauprat as Sand's "feminist manifesto" in 2021 for its frank depiction of sexual harassment and violence towards women, centuries before the Me Too movement.

Literary scholar Patricia Thomson argued that Mauprat influenced Emily Brontë's 1847 novel Wuthering Heights. She noted that both stories take place in the 1770s; contain "uninhibited ... references to the devil, hell, and damnation"; use "two houses to represent opposing ways of life"; and recount "the obsessive devotion of one man for one woman, which lasted not only for life but beyond the grave". Thomson stated that "the parallels and connections are there in profusion and I myself have little doubt that Mauprat formed part of the literary – and therefore, living – experience on which Emily Brontë drew."

== Film adaptations ==
Mauprat was adapted into a silent film with the same title by French director Jean Epstein in 1926. Luis Buñuel was assistant director on this film; it was his first film credit. The novel was also adapted into a film for television by French director Jacques Trébouta in 1972.
