= Henri Fescourt =

French film director (1880–1966)

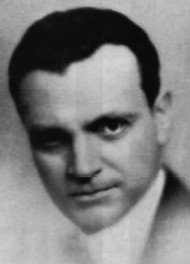
- Henri Fescourt
- Born: 23 November 1880; Béziers, France
- Died: 9 August 1966 (aged 85); Neuilly-sur-Seine, France
- Occupations: Film director, screenwriter
- Years active: 1912–1943

Henri Fescourt (23 November 1880 – 9 August 1966) was a French film director. He directed some 40 films in his career.

== Filmography ==
- 1912 : Un vol a été commis
- 1912 : Le Petit restaurant de l'impasse Canin
- 1912 : Paris-Saint-Pétersbourg, minuit trente-cinq
- 1912 : La Méthode du professeur Neura
- 1912 : La Loi de la guerre
- 1912 : L'Amazone masquée
- 1913 : La Voix qui accuse - Épisode 2: L'aiguille d'émeraude
- 1913 : La Voix qui accuse - Épisode 1: Gaston Béraut
- 1913 : Un obus sur Paris
- 1913 : Son passé
- 1913 : PS 32, Bureau 9
- 1913 : Pourquoi?
- 1913 : La Marquise de Trévenec
- 1913 : La Mariquita
- 1913 : Les Joyeuses noces de Saint-Lolo
- 1913 : Les Deux médaillons
- 1913 : Le Départ dans la nuit
- 1913 : Le Crime enseveli
- 1914 : Les Sept suffragettes de Saint-Lolo
- 1914 : Fleur d'exil
- 1914 : La Fille de prince
- 1916 : Suzanne et les vieillards
- 1921 : La Nuit du 13
- 1921 : Mathias Sandorf
- 1923 : Rouletabille chez les bohémiens
- 1924 : Les Grands
- 1924 : Mandrin
- 1924 : A Son from America
- 1925 : Les Misérables
- 1927 : L'Occident
- 1927 : La Maison du Maltais
- 1927 : La Glu
- 1928 : Karina the Dancer
- 1929 : Monte Cristo
- 1929 : Colette the Unwanted
- 1930 : La Maison de la flèche
- 1931 : Serments
- 1932 : Night Shift
- 1937 : L'Occident
- 1938 : Bar du sud
- 1938 : The West
- 1939 : Vous seule que j'aime
- 1940 : Facing Destiny
- 1943 : Retour de flamme

PUBLICATIONS

La Foi et les Montagnes ou le septième art au passé, Paris, P. Montel 1959

L'Idée et l'Ecran. Opinions sur le cinéma (avec Jean-Louis Bouquet), Paris 1925-26

Le Cinéma des origines à nos jours (sous la direction de H. Fescourt), Paris, éditions du Cygne, 1932, 3 vol.

Les Maudits. Drame en trois actes. Paris, Ed. de la Nouvelle Revue, 1908
