= René Barberis =

French screenwriter and film director

- Born: 11 March 1886; Nice, France
- Died: 11 August 1959 (aged 73)
- Occupations: Director, Screenwriter
- Years active: 1924 - 1943 (film)

René Barberis (11 March 1886 – 11 August 1959) was a French screenwriter and film director.

== Selected filmography ==
=== Director ===
- Colette the Unwanted (1927)
- The Vein (1928)
- The Unknown Dancer (1929)
- Temptation (1929)
- The Wonderful Day (1929)
- A Hole in the Wall (1930)
- Casanova (1934)
- Ramuntcho (1938)

=== Screenwriter ===
- A Lucky Man (1930)

== Bibliography ==
- Bentley, Bernard. A Companion to Spanish Cinema. Boydell & Brewer 2008.
