= Jacques Mauclair =

French actor

- Born: 12 January 1919; Paris, France
- Died: 20 December 2001 (aged 82)
- Occupation: Actor
- Years active: 1950-2000

Jacques Mauclair (12 January 1919 – 20 December 2001) was a French film actor. He appeared in 30 films between 1950 and 2000. He was born in Paris, France.

== Filmography ==
Year	Title	Role	Notes
1950	Old Boys of Saint-Loup	Un inspecteur	Uncredited
1950	Lost Souvenirs	Le photographe	(segment "Une statuette d'Osiris"), Uncredited
1957	Nathalie	Émile Truffaut	
1959	La femme et le Pantin	Stanislas Marchand	
1961	Vacances en enfer		
1961	Par-dessus le mur		
1963	Don't Tempt the Devil	Georges Boisset	
1963	Three Girls in Paris	Overbetjenten	
1964	Shadow of Evil	M. Smith	
1966	King of Hearts	Le maire	Uncredited
1970	Amour	Elises mand	
1977	Solveig et le violon turc		
1978	Brigade mondaine		
1981	La Puce et le Privé	Le médecin	
1981	Lenin v Parizhe		
1997	Same Old Song	Doctor #1	
