= Marcel Lesieur =

French scientist

Marcel Lesieur (12 July 1945 - 22 March 2022) was a French scientist.

He was a student of the École polytechnique and held a doctorate in science. A researcher at the Centre national de la recherche scientifique, he then became a professor of fluid mechanics at the Institut polytechnique de Grenoble. He led a research team at the Geophysical and Industrial Flow Laboratory.

Marcel Lesieur's work focused on turbulence modeling and simulation. He performed direct numerical simulations of large scales. His work has been applied to industrial sectors, particularly in subsonic and supersonic aerodynamics, nuclear engineering and meteorology.

He received various prizes including the CNRS bronze medal, the Seymour Cray-France prize and the Marcel Dassault Grand Prize from the Académie des sciences. He was elected a member of the French Academy of Sciences in 2003.
