= Jean Angelo =

French actor (1888–1933)

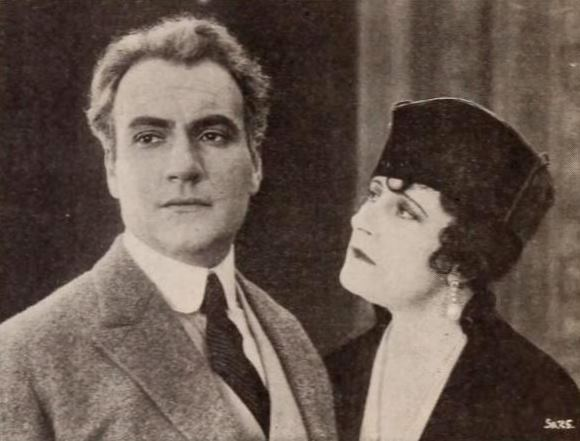
- Jean Angelo and Kitty Gordon in The Divine Sacrifice (1918).
- Born: Jean-Jacques Barthélémy; 17 May 1888; Paris, France
- Died: 26 November 1933 (aged 45); Paris, France
- Other name: Jean-Jacques Barthélémy
- Education: Apprentice to Sarah Bernhardt
- Occupations: French film actor of silent movies and early talkies.
- Years active: 1900–1933
- Era: Silent Film
- Father: Edouard Angelo (1843-1903)

Jean Angelo (born Jean-Jacques Barthélémy, 17 May 1888 – 26 November 1933) was a French film actor of silent movies and early talkies. He is best known for his role as The Count of Monte Cristo in the 1929 silent film Monte Cristo. He was the son of French actor Edouard Angelo (1843-1903), also known as Émile-Télémaque Barthélémy. His father accompanied Sarah Bernhardt on her first tour of America (1880-1881) and then on the European tour that followed. When Jean was fifteen in 1903, he made his stage debut under the training of Sarah Bernhardt. His first onscreen appearance was in the 1908 film The Assassination of the Duke of Guise. He also appeared in several film adaptations of Victor Hugo's plays The Hunchback of Notre-Dame (1911) and Les Misérables (1911). Both Jean and his father Edouard were the subjects of notable paintings created by Greek-French painter Théodore Jacques Ralli.

Jean was born in Paris, France. From a young age, he was a theater actor. From early in his career, he worked with the film director Albert Capellani, appearing in the silent film adaptation of The Mysteries of Paris. He paused his career during World War I, where he suffered combat injuries but eventually rose to prominence as a French Silent film actor in the 1920s, starring in films such as L'Atlantide (1921 film) and Nana (1926 film). He appeared in over sixty films throughout his career. He died of pneumonia while filming the talkie Colomba (1933 film) at forty-five years old.

== Biography ==
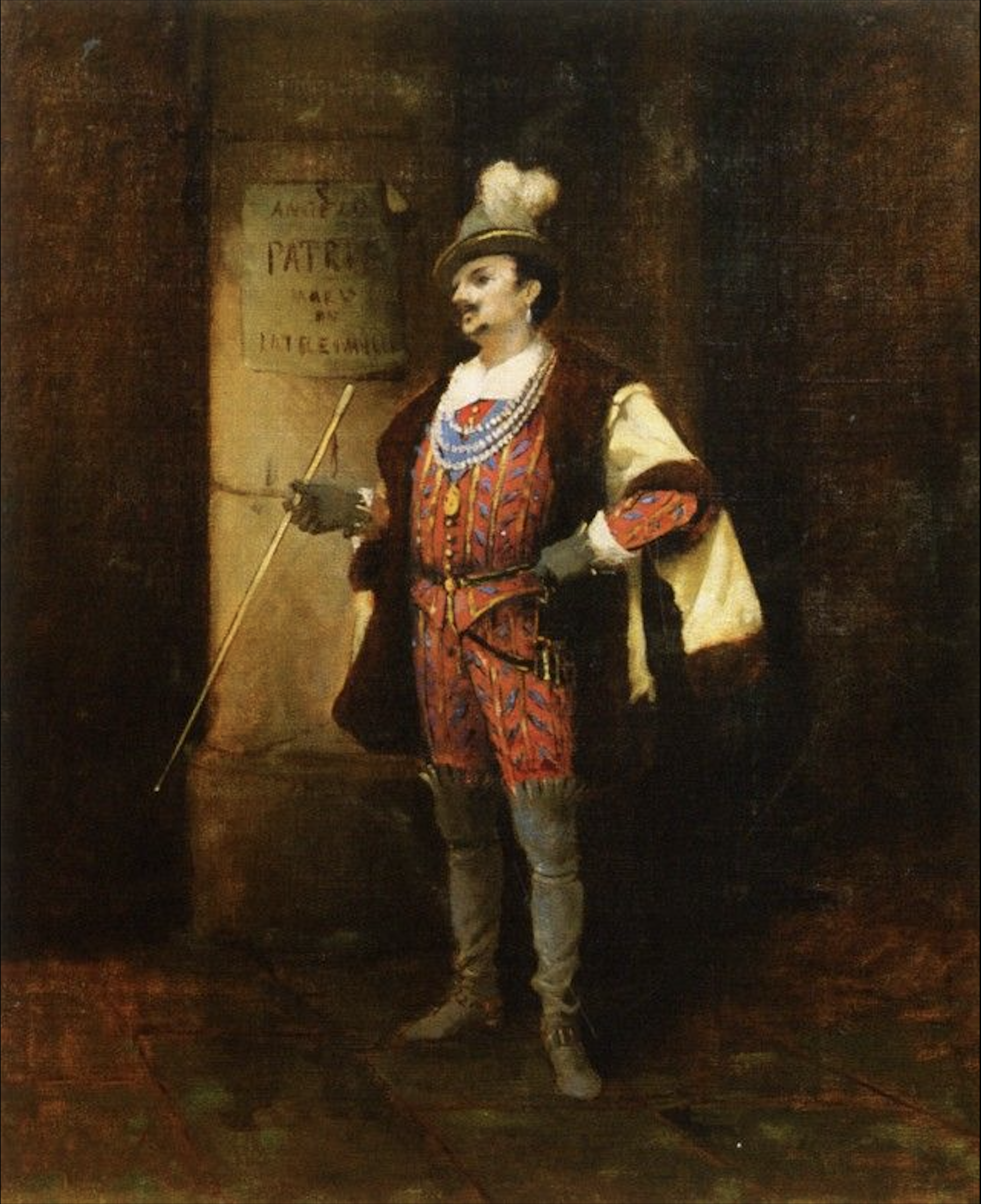
Edouard Angelo in a Theater Costume by Théodore Jacques Ralli

Jean-Jacques Barthélémy was born on 17 May 1888, in Paris, France, to stage actor Émile-Télémaque Barthélémy (1843-1903). His father used the stage name Edouard Angelo. His father was rumored to be the lover of actress Sarah Bernhardt, whom he toured the United States with in her famous American theater tour of 1880-1881.

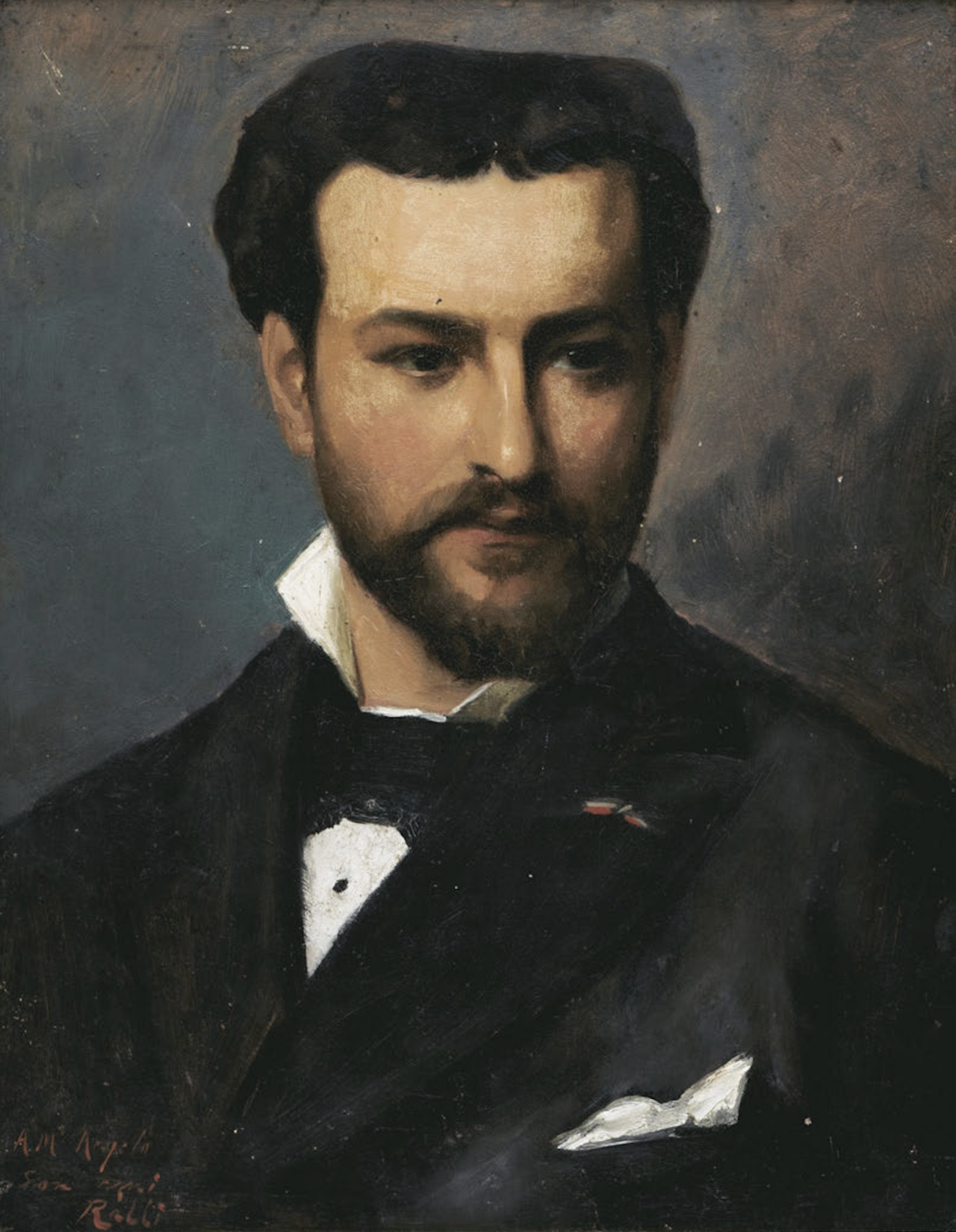
Portrait of Jean Angelo by Théodore Jacques Ralli c. 1903-1909

From a young age, Jean adopted the theater title Jean Angelo and was taught acting by his father's confrère, Sarah Bernhardt. Jean worked with her stage company from the age of fifteen. By 1908, Jean began appearing in Film d'art productions. One such production was the film The Assassination of the Duke of Guise directed by André Calmettes and Charles le Bargy. Jean also began to perform in films directed by Albert Capellani which were two film adaptations of Victor Hugo's plays The Hunchback of Notre-Dame (1911), Les Misérables (1913) and The Mysteries of Paris (1911).

By the start of World War I, he had already appeared in over twenty films, and at twenty-six years old, Jean joined the front lines, pausing his artistic career. The actor participated in the war and was injured, returning to films several years later, becoming a prominent silent film actor, featuring his athletic and attractive look. In the 1920s, he was known for fencing and became the hero of several adventure movies. He took the role of Captain Morhange in the 1921 film L'Atlantide and in 1924 he was Robert Surcouf in the film Surcouf. The actor gained immense popularity during the era and also starred in Jean Epstein's 1925 film The Adventures of Robert Macaire as Robert Macaire. By 1926, he appeared in Jean Renoir's film Nana as Count de Vandeuvres.

In 1929, he performed in the huge budget blockbuster Monte Cristo as Edmond Dantès, a film still impressive by today's standards due to its incredible staging and imagery. The actor also began to act in talkies, which was a transition from his silent film acting style. The actor was now required to speak in films. Jean reprised his role in the 1932 French language remake of the film Atlantis, named L'Atlantide as Captain Morhange with a speaking role. Regretably, it was one of Jean's last roles; the following year, he contracted pneumonia during the filming of the 1933 film Colomba and died at forty-five years old.

== Filmography ==
- 1908: Le Trouvère by Albert Capellani
- 1908: Salomé by Albert Capellani
- 1908: The Assassination of the Duke of Guise (314m) by André Calmettes
- 1909: Vengeance corse by René Chavance
- 1909: La Légende du violoneux (235m) by Adolphe Adenis - Pierre
- 1909: La Laide, conte hindou (195m) by Michel Carré - Iavèh
- 1909: Ordre du roy by Michel Carré
- 1910: Le Joueur de cornemuse by Charles Torquet - the bagpiper
- 1910: Fra Diavolo by Albert Capellani - Fra Diavolo
- 1910: La Folle des ruines - Production Pathe - - Yann
- 1911: The Hunchback of Notre Dame (810m) by Albert Capellani
- 1911: Les Mystères de Paris (1540m, in 4 parts) by Albert Capellani
- 1911: La Générosité du mari (175m) - Production S.C.A.G.L - -L'amant
- 1911: La Faute de la sœur aînée - Production S.C.A.G.L - - Cyprien, le fiancé
- 1912: Les Millions de l'orpheline (570m) by Daniel Riche - Xavier by Pibrac
- 1912: La Bien-aimée (La Douce Alsace) by Louis Le Forestier
- 1912: Les Amours de la reine Élisabeth (1100m) by Louis Mercanton and Henri Desfontaines - Seymour
- 1913: La Dernière heure
- 1913: Le Bonheur par l'enfant (710m) - Production S.C.A.G.L - André Miriam
- 1913: L'Argent ne fait pas le bonheur (780m) - Production S.C.A.G.L - Dominique
- 1913: Les Misérables (tourné en 4 époques: 1605m, 1605m, 1840m, 1840m) by Albert Capellani - Enjolras
- 1914: Vendetta by Louis Mercanton and René Hervil
- 1917: Par la vérité (1845m en 1 prologue et 4 parties) by Gaston Leprieur and Maurice by Féraudy
- 1917: Mères françaises (1230m) by Louis Mercanton and René Hervil - Robert d'Urbesc
- 1918: The Divine Sacrifice by George Archainbaud: David Carewe
- 1918: L'Expiation or Le marquis by Vilbois (1800m, in 4 parts) by Camille de Morlhon
- 1920: Les Chères Images (1300m) by André Hugon- Pierre and André Chantal
- 1920: L'Atlantide (4000m) by Jacques Feyder : Le Capt. Morhange
- 1921: Fromont jeune et Risler aîné (2000m, en deux époques) by Henry Krauss - Frantz Risler
- 1921: L'Autre (2000m) by Roger by Châteleux - Richard Malcor
- 1922: La Maison dans la forêt (2200m) by Jean Legrand
- 1922: L'Écuyère (1900m) by Léonce Perret: Le comte Guy de Maligny
- 1922: La Riposte (1500m) by Victor Tourjansky - Pablo Soriano
- 1923: Le Chant de l'amour triomphant (2000m) by Victor Tourjansky - Muzio
- 1924: Surcouf (Tourné en 8 époques : 1)"Le roi des corsaires", 2)"Les pontons Anglais", 3)"Les fiançailles tragiques", 4)"Un coeur de héros", 5)"La chasse à l'homme", 6)"La lettre à Bonaparte", 7)"La morsure du serpent", 8)"La réponse de Bonaparte". by Luitz-Morat - Robert Surcouf
- 1924: L'Aventurier (1925m) by Maurice Mariaud - Etienne Ranson
- 1924: Hotel Potemkin (Die letzte Stunde) by Max Neufeld
- 1925: Barocco (2750m) by Charles Burguet - Jean de Kérauden
- 1925: Le Double amour (2000m) by Jean Epstein - Jacques prémont-Solène
- 1925: The Adventures of Robert Macaire (5000m, tourné en 5 époques) by Jean Epstein : Robert Macaire
- 1926: Martyr (4600m, tourné en 4 époques) by Charles Burguet - Roger de mancel
- 1926: La Fin de Monte-Carlo by Mario Nalpas and Henri Étiévant - Raphaël Montera
- 1926: Nana (2800m, en 8 parties) by Jean Renoir: Le comte de Vandeuvres
- 1927: Une java by Henry Roussel - Jean Charvel
- Marquitta (1927) (2400m) by Jean Renoir - Le prince Vlasco
- 1927: Chantage (2750m) by Henri Debain: Le comte by Chincé
- 1927: Two Under the Stars by Johannes Guter
- 1928: La Ronde infernale by Luitz-Morat - Georges Gauthier
- 1928: The Case of Prosecutor M by Rudolf Meinert and Giulio Antamoro - Mirzew
- 1929: A Foolish Maiden by Luitz-Morat - Armaury
- 1929: Monte Cristo (6200m, in two parts) by Henri Fescourt: Edmond Dantès
- 1930: My Heart Incognito by Manfred Noa and André-Paul Antoine
- 1930: L'Homme qui assassina by Kurt Bernhardt and Jean Tarride: Le marquis de Sévigné
- 1930: L'Enfant by l'amour by Marcel L'Herbier: Paul Rantz
- 1931: La Dernière berceuse by Gennaro Righelli
- 1931: Sergeant X by Vladimir Strijewski - Chardin
- 1931: Atout cœur by Henry Roussell: Le comte Robert de Trembly-Matour
- 1932: The Triangle of Fire by Edmond T. Gréville: L'inspecteur Brémont
- 1932: L'Atlantide by Georg Wilhelm Pabst: Le capitaine Morhange
- 1933: Trois balles dans la peau by Roger Lion: Maxime Dartois
- 1933: Colomba by Jacques Séverac

== Bibliography ==
- Bergan, Ronald (2016). Jean Renoir Projections of Paradise. New York, NY: Skyhorse Publishing. ISBN 9781628726251.
- Marks, Patricia (2003). Sarah Bernhardt's First American Theatrical Tour, 1880-1881. Jefferson, North Carolina: McFarland, Incorporated, Publishers. ISBN 9780786414956.
- Martin, Jules (1895). Nos artistes Portraits et biographies suivis d'une notice sur les droits d'auteurs, l'Opéra, la Comédie-Française, les Associations artistiques, etc · Volume 1 [Our artists Portraits and biographies followed by a notice on copyright, the Opera, the Comédie-Française, artistic associations, etc. · Volume 1] (in French). Paris, France: Libr. de l'Annuaire Universel (Universal Directory Library).
- Fredman, Ernest W. (April 24, 1926). "Barocco". The Film Renter and Moving Picture News Issues (651). London, UK: William Cate LTD.
- Woodruff, Paul H. (June 16, 1917). "No Taps at Camp Brady". The Nickelodeon or Motography. 17 (24). Chicago, IL: Electricity Magazine Corporation.
