= Colomba (novella) =

1840 novella by Prosper Mérimée

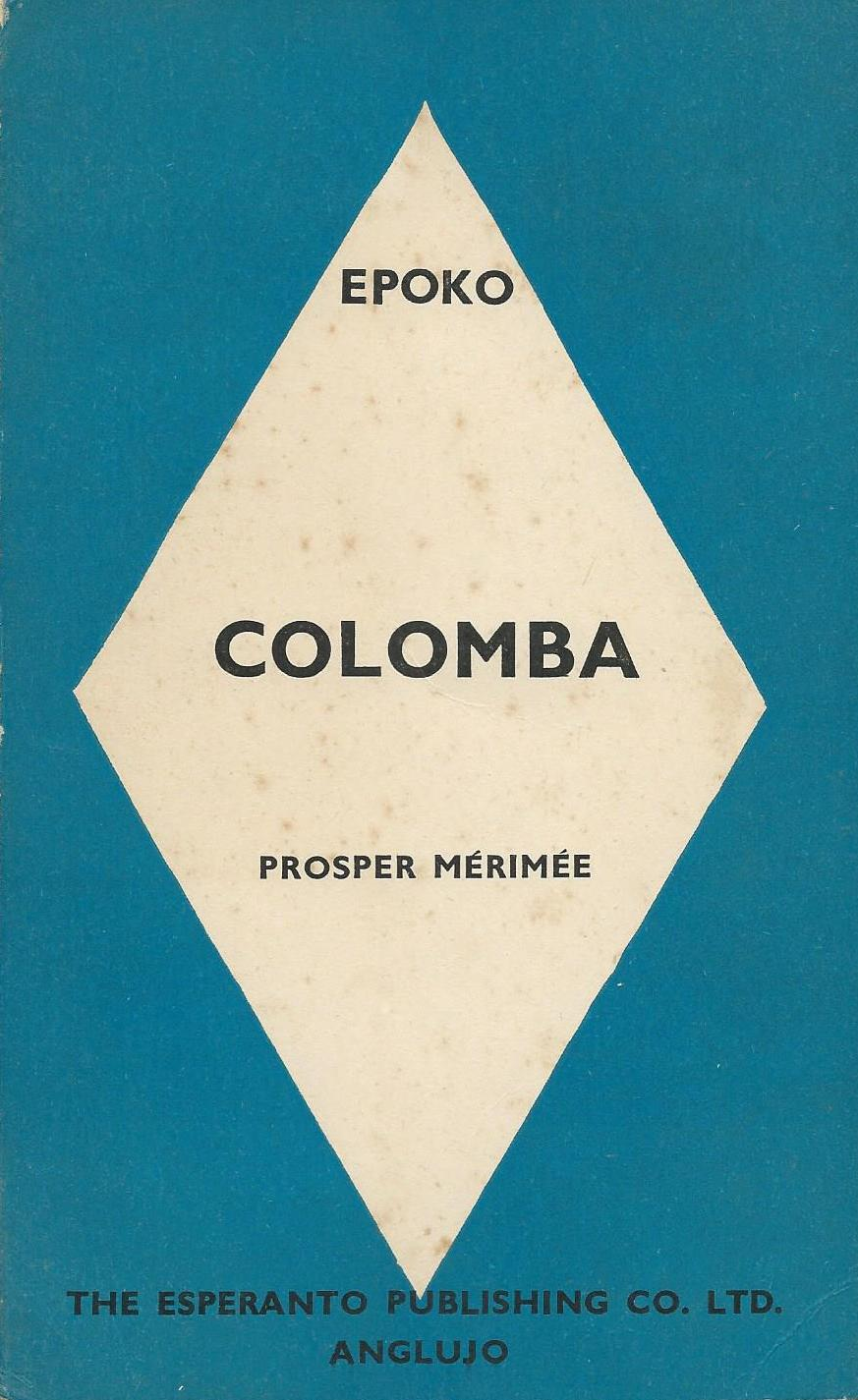
- Esperanto translation, 1938
- Author: Prosper Mérimée
- Language: French
- Genre: Novella
- Set in: Marseille and Corsica, c. 1816–1819
- Publisher: Revue des deux Mondes (periodical), Magen et Comon (book)
- Publication date: 1 July 1840 (periodical), 1841 (book)
- Publication place: France
- Dewey Decimal: 843.7
- LC Class: PQ2362.C6 B47
- Text: Colomba at Wikisource

Colomba is a novella by Prosper Mérimée. The novella first appeared on 1 July 1840 in the Revue des Deux Mondes and was collected with two other stories, "La Vénus d'Ille" and "Les Ames du Purgatoire", under the title Colomba, published in 1841 by Magen et Comon.

"Colomba" is set in Corsica, which Mérimée had visited in his capacity as an inspector of historical monuments. It tells of Lieutenant Orso della Rebbia's return to Corsica, where his sister, Colomba, tries to persuade him to avenge the death of their father.

Employing techniques that would later become core to the classic detective story, such as false clues, the manipulation of point of view, and the delayed revelation of the killer, "Colomba" foreshadows the development of the detective genre within a revenge narrative.

== Plot summary ==
Through the lens of historical fiction, the novella examines the Corsican vendetta. In the story, Orso is forced to consider whether he should avenge the death of his father, apparently perpetrated by the Barricini family. An Englishwoman, Lydia Nevil, attempts to dissuade him from murder, while his sister, Colomba, tries to ensure the opposite result.

== Characters ==
- Brandolaccio "Brando" Savelli - a friendly Corsican outlaw
- Brusco - Brando's dog
- Colomba della Rebbia - the titular character and sister to Orso
- Colonel Nevil - Lydia's father
- Giudice Barricini - a barrister and head of the Barricini family
- le Curé - a former theology student, now an outlaw
- Lydia Nevil - an Englishwoman and romantic interest of Orso
- Orlanduccio Barricini - son of Giudice Barricini
- Orso della Rebbia - Colomba's brother
- Vincentello Barricini - son of Giudice Barricini

== Adaptations ==
The story has been adopted on a number of occasions for the screen:

- Colomba, a 1920 French silent film directed by Jean Hervé
- Colomba, a 1933 French film directed by Jacques Séverac
- Colomba, a 1948 French film directed by Émile Couzinet
- Vendetta, a 1950 American film directed by Mel Ferrer
- Colomba, a 1982 French-Italian television series
