= Fifty Fathoms Deep =

Fifty Fathoms Deep may refer to:

- Fifty Fathoms Deep (1931 film), an American adventure film
- Fifty Fathoms Deep (1932 film), a French drama film
