= Antony Mars =

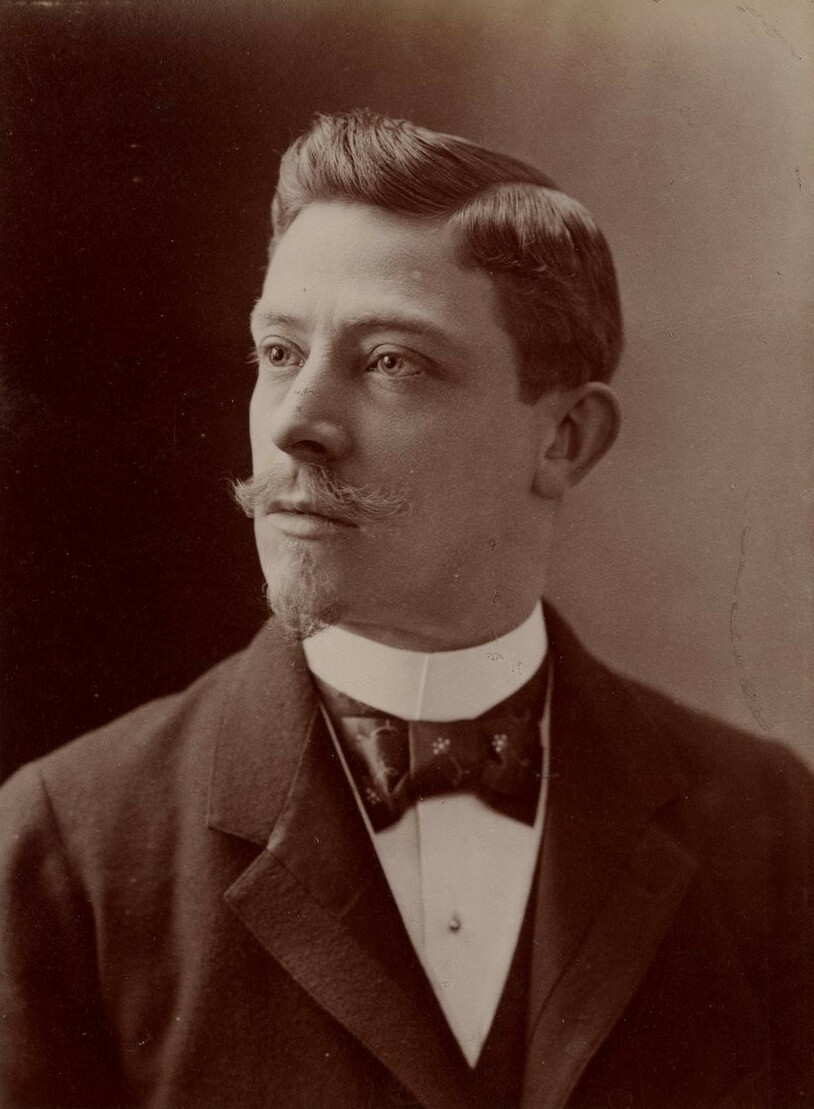
- Born: 22 October 1861; Vence, France
- Died: 17 February 1915 (aged 53); Paris, France
- Occupation: Playwright
- Years active: 1885 – 1923

Antony Mars (22 October 1861 – 17 February 1915) was a French playwright

== Biography ==
After he studied at a high school in Marseille, Antony March became a lawyer's clerk then an employee at the Compagnie des chemins de fer de l'Est. En 1882, he collaborated with several newspapers: La Cocarde, Le Mot d'ordre, Le Réveil (1882-1884).

A friend of Paul Morisse and Raymond Bonheur, he made his debut in theatre in Le Havre in 1885 with Les Droits de la femme. He obtained many successes in his time but today his most famous play remains Les Surprises du divorce written in 1888 with Alexandre Bisson.

== Works ==
He left a great number of plays, staged on the most famous Parisian venues: Théâtre des Bouffes-Parisiens, Théâtre de la Renaissance, Théâtre de Cluny, théâtre du Palais-Royal, théâtre du Gymnase or else Théâtre des Folies-Dramatiques, often presented again in the 1910s-1950s.

- 1885: Un enlèvement, monologue comique
- 1887: Quand on conspire !, opérette bouffe in 1 act
- 1887: Tête folle, comédie en vaudevilles in 2 acts with distincts and music
- 1888: Les Deux Pigeons, play in 2 acts, with songs and music, for young girls
- 1888: Veuve Durosel ! ..., comedy in 1 act
- 1889: La Meunière du Moulin-joli, play in 2 acts, with chorus and distincts
- 1889: Les Maris sans femmes, comedy in 3 acts
- 1889: Le Secret des Pardhaillan, folie-vaudeville in 1 act
- 1889: Les Surprises du divorce, comedy in 3 acts, with Alexandre Bisson
- 1890: À la salle de police, saynète
- 1890: Les Douze Femmes de Japhet, vaudeville opérette in three acts
- 1890: Un monsieur qui dîne en ville, comedy in 1 act
- 1890: Les Vieux Maris, comédie en vaudevilles in 3 acts
- 1891: La Demoiselle du téléphone
- 1891: Le Mitron
- 1892: Les Vingt-huit Jours de Clairette, vaudeville-operetta in 4 acts
- 1892: La Bonne de chez Duval
- 1892: 3, rue de la Pompe
- 1893: L'Homme à l'oreille cassée
- 1893: Un conte bleu, operetta in 3 acts
- 1894: Barbotin et Picquoiseau, comédie en vaudevilles in two acts
- 1894: Monsieur Gavroche, comédie en vaudevilles in two acts with chorus and distincts
- 1895: La Dot de Brigitte, operetta in 3 acts
- 1896: Le Voyage de Corbillon
- 1896: L'Hôtel du lac, vaudeville in two acts
- 1896: Le Mari d'Hortense, comedy in 1 act
- 1896: Rose et Blanche, comedy in two acts, with chorus and distincts
- 1896: Sa majesté l'amour, operetta with extravaganza in 3 acts
- 1896: Le Truc de Séraphin, comedy in three acts, with Maurice Desvallières
- 1897: Les Fêtards, operetta in 3 acts, with Maurice Hennequin
- 1897: La Succession Beaugaillard, comédie en vaudevilles in three acts
- 1898: Le Docteur Oscar, comédie en vaudevilles in 1 act
- 1899: La Mouche
- 1899: La Poule blanche
- 1899: La Meunière du Moulin-joli, comedy in 2 acts, with chorus and distincts
- 1901: Le Billet de logement, comédie en vaudevilles in 3 acts
- 1902: La Petite Cendrillon, operetta in 2 acts
- 1903: La Marmotte
- 1906: Le Fils à papa, comédie en vaudevilles in 3 acts, with Maurice Desvallières
- 1909: La Revanche d'Ève
- 1911: Madame l'Amirale
- 1911: La Roue de la fortune, comédie en vaudevilles in 2 acts
- 1911: Mon ami Chose !..., comédie en vaudevilles in 1 act, for young men
- 1912: Son Altesse, comédie en vaudevilles in 2 acts
- 1913: La Chaste Suzanne, operetta in 3 acts (a French version of Die keusche Susanne which is based on Le Fils à papa, 1906)
- 1923: La Mort d'Arthème Lapin, drame parodique (mélimélodrama) in 1 act

== Filmography ==
- Les Surprises du divorce, directed by Georges Monca and Charles Prince (France, 1912, short film, based on Les Surprises du divorce)
- Le Fils à papa, directed by Georges Monca and Charles Prince (France, 1913, short film, based on Le Fils à papa)
- Le Voyage de Corbillon, directed by Georges Monca and Charles Prince (France, 1914, short film, based on Le Voyage de Corbillon)
- I mariti allegri, directed by Camillo De Riso (Italy, 1914, short film, based on Les Maris sans femmes)
- L'ammiraglia, directed by Nino Oxilia (Italy, 1914, short film, based on Madame l'Amirale)
- The Girl in the Taxi, directed by Lloyd Ingraham (1921, based on Le Fils à papa)
- Le sorprese del divorzio, directed by Guido Brignone (Italy, 1923, based on Les Surprises du divorce)
- Chaste Susanne, directed by Richard Eichberg (Germany, 1926, based on Le Fils à papa)
- I 28 giorni di Claretta, directed by Eugenio Perego (Italy, 1927, based on Les Vingt-huit Jours de Clairette)
- Billeting Order, directed by Charles-Félix Tavano (France, 1932, based on Le Billet de logement)
- Les Surprises du divorce, directed by Jean Kemm (France, 1933, based on Les Surprises du divorce)
- Les Vingt-huit Jours de Clairette, directed by André Hugon (France, 1933, based on Les Vingt-huit Jours de Clairette)
- Min svärmor - dansösen, directed by Thor L. Brooks (Sweden, 1936, based on Les Surprises du divorce)
- La Chaste Suzanne, directed by André Berthomieu (France, 1937, based on Le Fils à papa)
  - The Girl in the Taxi, directed by André Berthomieu (UK, 1937, based on Le Fils à papa)
- Le sorprese del divorzio, directed by Guido Brignone (Italy, 1939, based on Les Surprises du divorce)
- Las sorpresas del divorcio, directed by Roberto Ratto (Argentina, 1943, based on Les Surprises du divorce)
- La Casta Susana, directed by Benito Perojo (Argentina, 1944, based on Le Fils à papa)
- La Casta Susana, directed by Luis César Amadori (Spain, 1963, based on Le Fils à papa)

== Bibliography ==
- Hugo P. Thieme, Guide bibliographique de la littérature française de 1800 à 1906, 1907
- Grand Larousse encyclopédique en dix volumes, 1963, p. 121
- Kurt Gänzl, The Encyclopedia of the Musical Theatre, vol.2, 2001, p. 13

=== External links ===
- Antony Mars on data.bnf.fr
- Antony Mars at IMDb
