= The Mysteries of Paris (disambiguation) =

The Mysteries of Paris (French: Les mystères de Paris) may refer to:

- The Mysteries of Paris, a novel by the writer Eugène Sue
- The Mysteries of Paris (1922 film), a French silent film directed by Charles Burguet
- The Mysteries of Paris (1935 film), a French film directed by Félix Gandéra
- The Mysteries of Paris (1943 film), a French film directed by Jacques de Baroncelli
- The Mysteries of Paris (1957 film), a French-Italian film directed by Fernando Cerchio
- The Mysteries of Paris (1962 film), a French-Italian film directed by André Hunebelle
