= Manuel Orazi =

Italian painter

- Born: Emmanuel Joseph Raphael Orazi; 5 October 1860; Rome, Papal State
- Died: 28 October 1934 (aged 74); Paris, French Third Republic
- Spouse: Marie Agnan
- Parents: François Orazi (father); Marie del Pianto (mother)

Signature
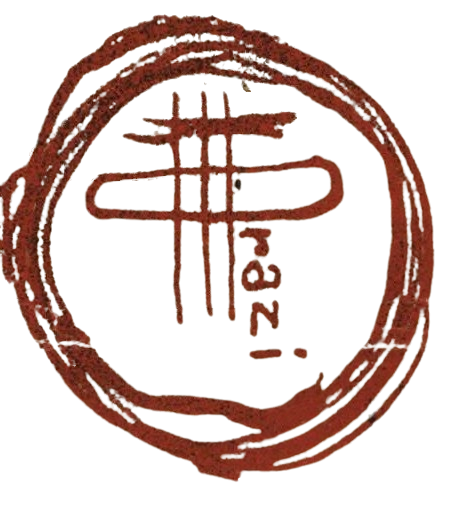

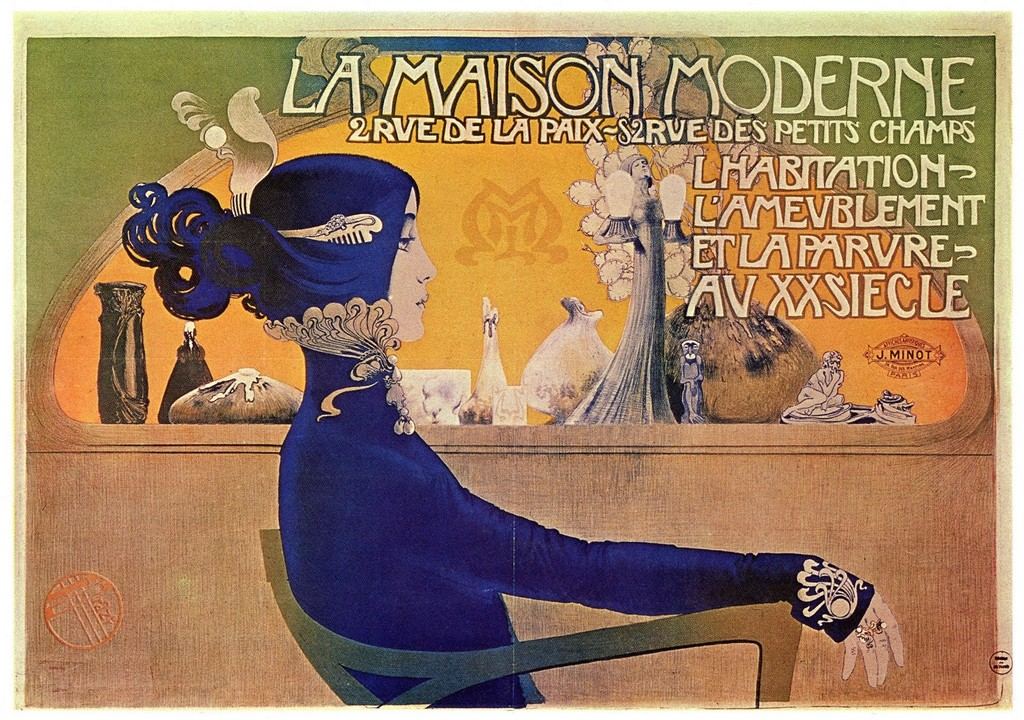
Advertisement for La Maison Moderne 1902

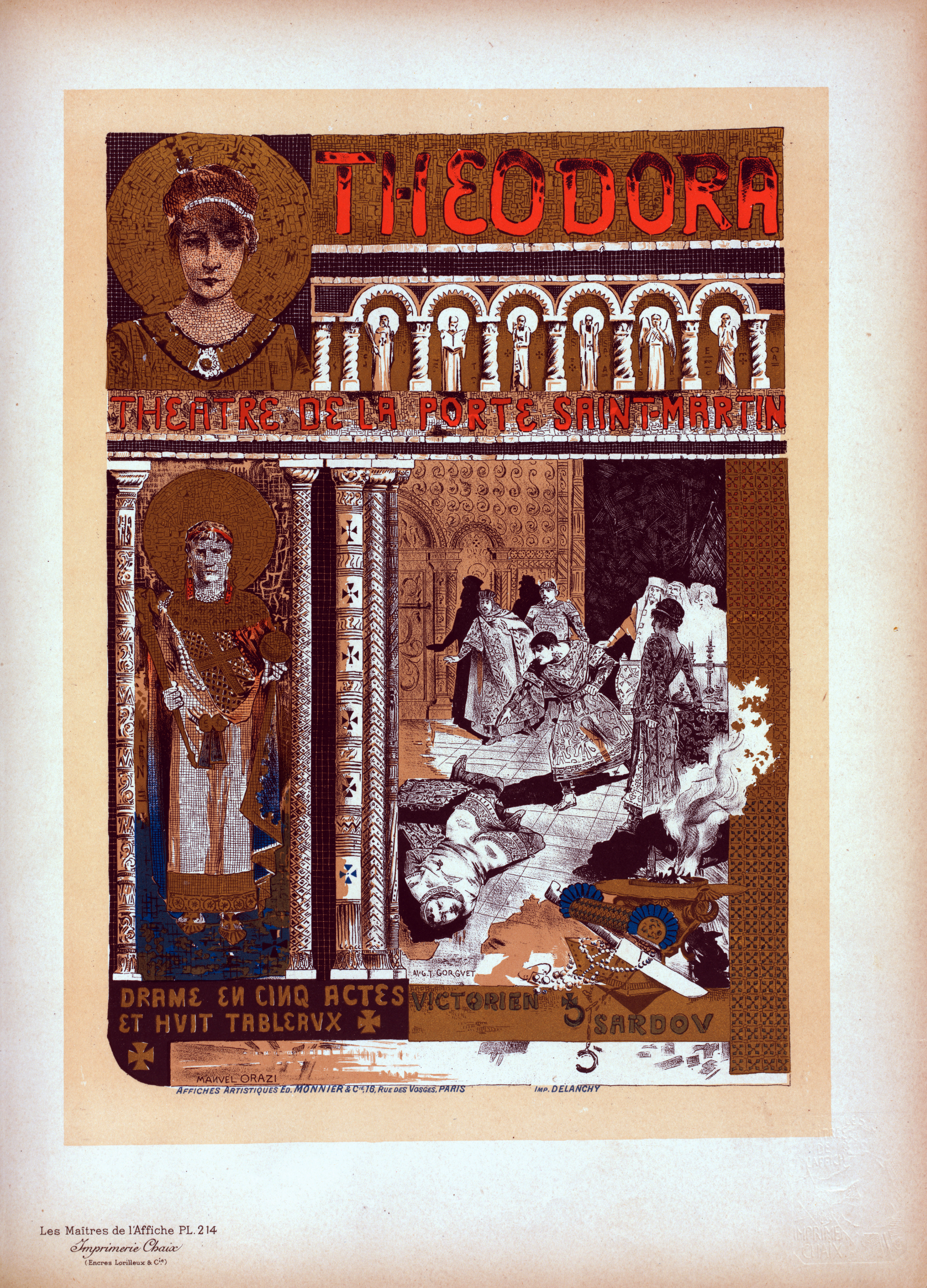
Poster 214 in Les Maîtres de l'Affiche

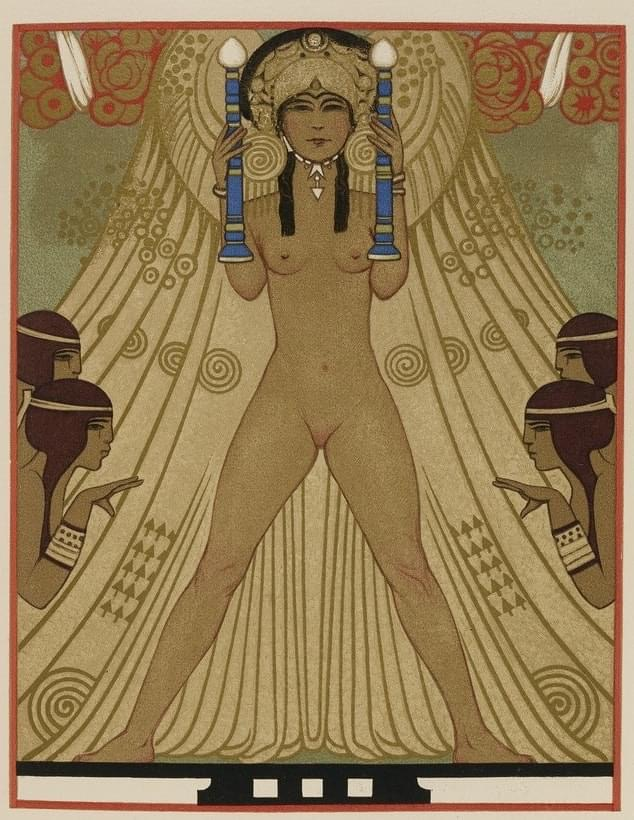
Illustration by Manuel Orazi for Oscar Wilde's 1891 play Salome

Manuel Orazi (born Emmanuel Joseph Raphaël Orazi; 1860 – 1934) was an Italian Art Nouveau illustrator, poster artist, and jewelry designer, and a set creator for theater and film.

Not much is known about him and his background is obscure. He was born in Rome on October 5, 1860.

A September 1907 manifest from SS La Provence sailing from Le Havre to Ellis Island mentions a wife residing in France: "Mrs Orazi in Fontainebleau." According to his death certificate, at the time of his death he was married to Marie Agnan and lived in Rue de l'Université 195, Paris.

He died in Paris on October 28, 1934.

== Notable works ==
In 1895 he created the Calendrier Magique, an occult-themed calendar still noted for its graphic design. Limiting it to 777 copies, he collaborated with popular French author Austin de Croze, who wrote the text.

Sympathetic to the French Decadent movement, as well as Symbolism and Aestheticism, he contributed with illustrations and typographic ornaments in books and short stories such as:

- Ma petite ville (1898) by Jean Lorrain
- Princesse d'Italie (1898) by Jean Lorrain
- Aventures merveilleuses de Huon de Bordeaux (1898) by Gaston Paris
- Anne-Marie, La Providence (1899) by Daniel Laumonier
- Les vierges de Syracuse (1902) by Jean Bertheroy
- Névrose (1904) by Émile Morel
- Henri de Régnier, biographie (1904) by Paul Léauteaud
- Émile Faguet, biographie (1904) by Alphonse Séché
- Camille Lemonnier, biographie (1904) by León Bazalgette
- Théodora, impératrice de Byzance (1904) by Charles Diehl
- Le Nouveau Jeu (1905) by Henri Lavedan
- La danseuse de Pompéi (1905) by Jean Bertheroy
- La Morphine (1906) by Victorien Du Saussay
- Du Mystérieux au Tragique (1911) by Arthur Conan Doyle
- L'Epouse du Soleil (1912) by Gaston Leroux
- La guerre du feu (1913) by J.-H. Rosny
- Les troix yeux (1919) by Maurice Leblanc
- Heroides (1919) by Ovid
- Le Butineur (1924) by Félicien Champsaur
- Aphrodite (1931) by Pierre Louÿs
- Les Fleurs du mal (1934) by Baudelaire

Orazi illustrated an early Art Deco French edition of the 1891 one-act play by Oscar Wilde, Salome.

He made jewelry designs that were displayed at Maison de l'Art Nouveau in 1896. In 1899 he designed some of the first pieces of jewelry for the Maison Arnould. His jewelry designs were also sold at La Maison Moderne. Orazi designed one of the best known posters for La Maison Moderne as well as the cover of one of La Maison Moderne's catalogs which features Cleo de Merode in profile, perhaps wearing a design by Henri Van de Velde.

For her theater at the Universal Exposition in Paris in 1900, Loie Fuller commissioned Orazi to create the poster, which was printed in three editions and three color schemes.

In 1921 he designed the sets and costumes for the silent film L'Atlantide and illustrated many promotional posters.

Orazi contributed to publications such as anarchist satirical magazine L'Assiette au Beurre, Femina, Scribner's Magazine, Je sais tout and Les Maîtres de l'Affiche.
