= L'Atlantide (1932 film) =

1932 film

- French film poster for L'Atlantide
- Directed by: G. W. Pabst
- Screenplay by: Ladislaus Vajda; Hermann Oberländer
- Based on: Atlantida by Pierre Benoît
- Produced by: Seymour Nebenzahl; Romain Pinès
- Starring: Brigitte Helm
- Cinematography: Eugen Schüfftan; Joseph Barth
- Edited by: Hans Oser
- Music by: Wolfgang Zeller
- Production companies: Nero-Film AG; Société Internationale Cinématographique
- Release date: 8 June 1932 (France)
- Running time: 90 minutes
- Countries: Germany; France

L'Atlantide (released in English as The Mistress of Atlantis and in German as Die Herrin von Atlantis) is a 1932 German-French adventure and fantasy film directed by G. W. Pabst and starring Brigitte Helm. It is based on the novel L'Atlantide by Pierre Benoît, and is a remake of the 1921 film of the same name

== Plot ==
=== Plot summary ===
The film is set in a French colony in Africa. Saint-Avit is a young French officer who recounts the story of his adventure in the sunken city of Atlantis.

In Atlantis, the beautiful Antinea rules her city. Saint-Avil and his friend Morhange were taken there. Antinea has a reputation for making every man hopelessly infatuated with her, and this is also true for Saint-Avil. Only Morhange refuses to be bewitched by her beauty and remains steadfast. This angers the ruler, and she convinces Saint-Avil to kill his friend. Saint-Avil is utterly distraught after the deed.

Antinea becomes his enemy, but his revenge is unsuccessful. Only with the last of his strength does he manage to escape Atlantis and avoid being murdered by Antinea.

His tale rekindles his passion and devotion to Antinea. He sets off for Atlantis once more but disappears in a sandstorm in the desert and is never seen again.

=== Plot notes ===
Although the plot of this version of L'Atlantide follows the novel and the 1921 film, Pabst and his screenplay writers Ladislaus Vadja and Hermann Oberländer took a different approach to several points in the film. While Benoît's novel was written in a literal and linear way, Pabst took creative liberties. One notable point is that in this version, the film begins with Saint-Avit having a flashback activated by a broadcast on the radio that discusses the possibility of Atlantis being located in the Sahara. As it ends, Saint-Avit speaks to a fellow soldier, confirming the broadcaster's hypothesis and commences telling his story. The structure of narration from this point is framed entirely as a flashback from Saint-Avit, who may be suffering from hallucinations caused by desert heat, or by his compulsion to smoke hashish. Because of this, viewers may be unsure whether or not Saint-Avit can be trusted as a narrator.

== Cast ==
Cast lists
Die Herrin von Atlantis (German-language version)	L'Atlantide (French-language version)	The Mistress of Atlantis (English-language version)
Brigitte Helm as Antinea	Brigitte Helm as Antinéa	Brigitte Helm as Antinea
Heinz Klingenberg as Leutnant St. Avit	Pierre Blanchar as Capitaine St. Avit	John Stuart as St. Avit
Tela Tchaï as Tanit Serga	Tela Tchaï as Tanit Zerga	Tela Tchaï as Tanit Serga
Gustav Diessl as Hauptmann Morhange	Jean Angelo as Capitaine Morhange	Gustav Diessl as Morhange
Wladimir Sokoloff as Graf Bielowsky, Hetman von Schytomyr	Vladimir Sokoloff as Hetman de Jitomir	Gibb McLaughlin as Count Bielowsky
Georges Tourreil as Leutnant Ferrières	Georges Tourreil as Lieutenant Ferrières	Georges Tourreil as Lieutn. Ferrières
Mathias Wieman as Torstenson	Mathias Wieman as Torstensen	Mathias Wieman as Torstensen
Florelle as Clémentine	Florelle as Clémentine	Florelle as Clementine
Gertrude Pabst as Amerikanische Journalistin	Gertrude Pabst as journaliste	
Rositta Severus-Liedernit	Rositta Severus-Liedernit	Rositta Severus-Liedernit

== Production ==
The film is a remake of the 1921 film of the same name directed by Jacques Feyder. After Feyder refused to create a sound remake of L'Atlantide, Pabst took on direction of the film. Both Pabst and Feyder's film adaptations were shot in the Sahara Desert. To compete with American films, the film was shot in three languages: English, French and German. Jean Angelo, who had played Cpt. Morhange in Feyder's version, reprised his role in the French version of the remake. Brigitte Helm played Queen Antinea in all three versions.

== Legacy ==
An American remake, Siren of Atlantis, was released in 1949 starring Maria Montez in the title role, with her husband Jean Pierre Aumont as Saint-Avit. Another version, Journey Beneath the Desert, with Haya Harareet as Antinea, was released in 1961 as a French-Italian co-production. Another version, L'Atlantide, was released in 1992, with Victoria Mahoney as Antinea.

== Bibliography ==
- Benoit, Pierre; Frey, Hugo (2005). The Queen of Atlantis. Lincoln: University of Nebraska Press. ISBN 978-0-8032-6916-3.
