= A Legionnaire =

1936 film

- Directed by: Christian-Jaque
- Written by: J.D. Newsom (novel); Paul Fékété
- Produced by: Joe Francis
- Starring: Fernandel; Robert Le Vigan; Daniel Mendaille
- Cinematography: Fred Langenfeld
- Edited by: André Versein
- Music by: Casimir Oberfeld; Mahieddine
- Production company: Productions Calamy
- Distributed by: Gray-Film
- Release date: 18 September 1936
- Running time: 91 minutes
- Country: France
- Language: French

A Legionnaire (French: Un de la légion) is a 1936 French comedy adventure film directed by Christian-Jaque and starring Fernandel, Robert Le Vigan and Daniel Mendaille.

The film's sets were designed by the art director Pierre Schild. Location shooting took place in Marseille and Sidi Bel Abbès.

== Plot ==
A hen-pecked husband finds his life turned upside down, when he is accidentally enlisted in the French Foreign Legion. He is sent to fight in Algeria.

== Cast ==
- Fernandel as Fernand Espitalion
- Robert Le Vigan as Leduc
- Daniel Mendaille as Charlin
- Arthur Devère as Vandercleef
- Rolla Norman as Carron
- Thérèse Dorny as Antoinette Espitalion
- Jacques Varennes as Durand
- Paul Amiot as Le colonel
- Jean Kolb as Le médecin-chef
- Suzy Prim as Maryse
- Paul Azaïs as Turlot
- Régine Dancourt as L'amie de Pierrot
- Georges Malkine as Le légionnaire russe
- Eugène Stuber as Un légionnaire
- Marcel Vidal as Maître Troude

== Bibliography ==
- Andrews, Dudley. Mists of Regret: Culture and Sensibility in Classic French Film. Princeton University Press, 1995.
