= Count Kostia =

1925 film

- Directed by: Jacques Robert
- Written by: Victor Cherbuliez (novel); Jacques Robert
- Produced by: Jacques Robert
- Starring: Conrad Veidt; Genica Athanasiou; Claire Darcas
- Cinematography: Lucien Bellavoine; Georges Lucas
- Production company: Jacques Robert Film
- Distributed by: Phocea Film
- Release date: 29 May 1925
- Running time: 102 minutes
- Country: France
- Languages: Silent; French intertitles

Count Kostia (French: Le comte Kostia) is a 1925 French silent historical film directed by Jacques Robert and starring Conrad Veidt, Genica Athanasiou and Claire Darcas. It is based on the 1863 novel of the same title by Victor Cherbuliez which is set in the Russian Empire. It is a lost film.

== Cast ==
In alphabetical order

- Genica Athanasiou as Stéphane
- Louise Barthe
- Pierre Daltour as Gilbert de Saville
- Claire Darcas as Comtesse Kostia
- Henri Desmarets as Ivan
- Milton J. Fahrney as Fritz
- Robby Guichard
- Yvette Langlais
- André Nox as Vladimir Paulitch
- Paul Pauley as Le pope Alexis
- Florence Talma as Madame Lerins
- Conrad Veidt as Comte Kostia

== Bibliography ==
- John T. Soister. Conrad Veidt on Screen: A Comprehensive Illustrated Filmography. McFarland, 2002.
