= The Temple of Shadows =

1927 film

- Directed by: André Hugon
- Starring: Camille Bert; Max Tréjean; Georges Melchior
- Production companies: Star Film; L.C.J. Editions & Productions
- Distributed by: Star Film
- Release date: 26 August 1927
- Country: France
- Languages: Silent; French intertitles

The Temple of Shadows (French:La vestale du Gange) is a 1927 French silent film directed by André Hugon and starring Camille Bert, Max Tréjean and Georges Melchior.

== Cast ==
- Camille Bert
- Max Tréjean
- Georges Melchior
- Paul Franceschi
- Simone d'A-Lal
- Félix d'Aps
- Bernhard Goetzke
- Madame Lenoir
- Regina Thomas

== Bibliography ==
- Rège, Philippe. Encyclopedia of French Film Directors, Volume 1. Scarecrow Press, 2009.
