= Pierre Schild =

Russian Empire-born art director (1897–1968)

- Born: 1897; Saint Petersburg, Russian Empire
- Died: 1968 (aged 70–71); Madrid, Spain
- Other name: Lakka Schildknecht
- Occupation: Art director
- Years active: 1923 - 1960 (film)

Pierre Schild (1897–1968) was a Russian-born art director known for his work in French and Spanish cinema. Born Lakka Schildknecht, he left Russia following the October Revolution in 1917. Following the German invasion of France in 1940 he emigrated to Spain.

== Selected filmography ==
- Michel Strogoff (1926)
- Napoleon (1927)
- A Foolish Maiden (1929)
- Nights of Princes (1930)
- The Perfume of the Lady in Black (1931)
- Queen of the Night (1931)
- Under the Leather Helmet (1932)
- A Telephone Call (1932)
- To Be Loved (1933)
- The Scandal (1934)
- Youth (1934)
- Return to Paradise (1935)
- Whirlpool of Desire (1935)
- Count Obligado (1935)
- The Mascot (1935)
- Merchant of Love (1935)
- Ferdinand the Roisterer (1935)
- A Legionnaire (1936)
- Monsieur Personne (1936)
- The Volga Boatman (1936)
- Josette (1937)
- Francis the First (1937)
- In Venice, One Night (1937)
- Barnabé (1938)
- Hercule (1938)
- Ernest the Rebel (1938)
- Rail Pirates (1938)
- Three from St Cyr (1939)
- Angelica (1939)
- The Millions of Polichinela (1941)
- Fever (1943)
- It Happened in Damascus (1943)
- Thirsty Land (1945)
- A Cuban in Spain (1951)

== Bibliography ==
- Bentley, Bernard. A Companion to Spanish Cinema. Boydell & Brewer 2008.
