= The City Destroyed =

1924 film by Luitz-Morat

- Directed by: Luitz-Morat
- Written by: Jean-Louis Bouquet
- Produced by: Luitz-Morat
- Cinematography: Frank Daniau-Johnston
- Production company: Films de France
- Distributed by: Pathé Consortium Cinéma
- Release date: 5 December 1924
- Running time: 72 minutes
- Country: France
- Languages: Silent; French intertitles

The City Destroyed (French: La cité foudroyée) is a 1924 French silent film directed by Luitz-Morat.

== Synopsis ==
The City Destroyed (1924)

A young engineer having discovered how to manipulate lightning threatens to destroy Paris if he is not paid a ransom.

== Cast ==
- Daniel Mendaille as Richard Gallée
- Jane Maguenat as Huguette
- Armand Morins as Baron de Vrécourt
- Alexis Ghasne as Hans Steinberg
- Lucien Cazalis as Grosset
- Paul Journée as Battling Martel
- Simone Judic as La bonne
- Émilien Richard as Cuivredasse

== Bibliography ==
- William J. Fanning Jr. Death Rays and the Popular Media, 1876-1939: A Study of Directed Energy Weapons in Fact, Fiction and Film. McFarland, 2015.
