= The Lighthouse Keepers (film) =

1929 film

- French: Gardiens de phare
- Directed by: Jean Grémillon
- Written by: Pierre Antier (play); P. Cloquemin (play); Jacques Feyder
- Starring: Paul Fromet; Geymond Vital; Genica Athanasiou
- Cinematography: Georges Périnal
- Production company: Films du Grand Guignol
- Release date: 4 October 1929
- Running time: 82 minutes
- Country: France
- Languages: Silent; French intertitles

The Lighthouse Keepers (French: Gardiens de phare) is a 1929 French silent drama film directed by Jean Grémillon and starring Paul Fromet, Geymond Vital and Genica Athanasiou. It is set on the coast of Brittany where two keepers, a father and son, work a lighthouse together.

== Cast ==
- Paul Fromet as Père Brehan
- Geymond Vital as Yvon Bréhan
- Genica Athanasiou as Marie
- Gabrielle Fontan as Mère de Marie
- Maria Fromet
