= A Foolish Maiden =

1929 film directed by Luitz-Morat

- Directed by: Luitz-Morat
- Written by: Henry Bataille (play); Luitz-Morat
- Produced by: Serge Sandberg
- Starring: Emmy Lynn; Jean Angelo; Suzy Vernon
- Cinematography: Henri Barreyre; Joseph-Louis Mundwiller
- Production company: Éclair-Journal
- Distributed by: Films Paramount
- Release date: 4 January 1929
- Country: France
- Languages: Silent; French intertitles

A Foolish Maiden (French: La vierge folle) is a 1929 French silent comedy film directed by Luitz-Morat and starring Emmy Lynn, Jean Angelo and Suzy Vernon. The film's sets were designed by the art director Pierre Schild. It was remade in 1938 as a sound film A Foolish Maiden.

== Cast ==
- Emmy Lynn as Fanny Armaury
- Jean Angelo as Armaury
- Suzy Vernon as Diane de Charance
- Maurice Schutz as Le duc de Charance
- Pierre Fresnay as Gaston de Charance
- Simone Judic as Kerty
- Marguerite de Morlaye as La duchesse du Charance

== Bibliography ==
- Crisp, Colin. Genre, Myth and Convention in the French Cinema, 1929-1939. Indiana University Press, 2002.
