= The Advocate (1925 film) =

1925 film

- Directed by: Gaston Ravel
- Written by: Eugène Brieux (play); Gaston Ravel
- Starring: Rolla Norman; Mirales; Sylvio De Pedrelli
- Cinematography: Lucien Bellavoine
- Production company: Films Jean de Merly
- Release date: 5 December 1925
- Country: France
- Languages: Silent; French intertitles

The Advocate (French: L'avocat) is a 1925 French silent drama film based upon the play by Eugène Brieux, directed by Gaston Ravel and starring Rolla Norman, Mirales and Sylvio De Pedrelli.

== Cast ==
- Rolla Norman as Louis Martigny
- Mirales as Louis de Codrais
- Sylvio De Pedrelli as Xavier de Codrais
- Jeanne Méa as Madame Martigny
- Sylviane de Castillo as Madame du Codrais
- Irma Perrot as Pauline
- Henri Maillard as Le Président Martigny
- Nicolai De Seversky as Comte de Codrais père

== Bibliography ==
- Alfred Krautz. International directory of cinematographers, set- and costume designers in film, Volume 4. Saur, 1984.
