= The Big Trail (1931 film) =

1931 film

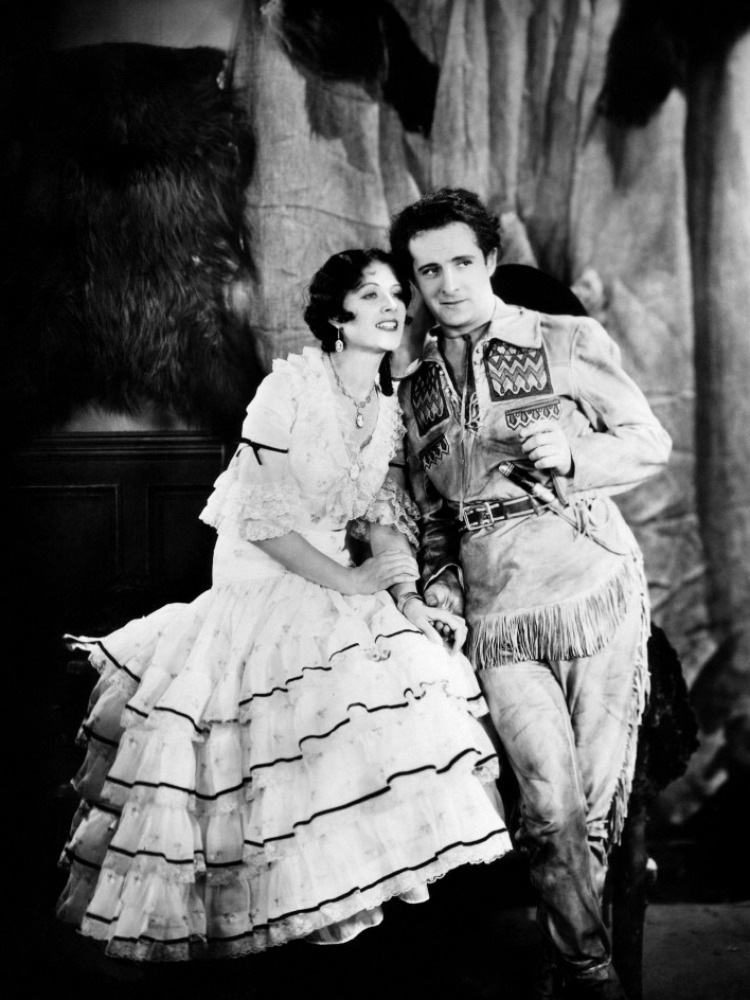
- Jeanne Helbling and Gaston Glass
- Directed by: Pierre Couderc
- Written by: Hal G. Evarts
- Produced by: William Fox
- Starring: Gaston Glass; Jeanne Helbling
- Production company: Fox Film Corporation
- Distributed by: Fox Film Corporation
- Release date: 30 March 1931
- Running time: 97 minutes
- Country: France
- Language: French

The Big Trail (French: La Piste des géants) is a 1931 French western film directed by Pierre Couderc and starring Gaston Glass and Jeanne Helbling. It is the French-language version of Fox's The Big Trail (1930) starring John Wayne and directed by Raoul Walsh. In the early years of sound it was common to make multiple-language versions of films, until the practice of dubbing became more widespread.

== Cast ==
- Gaston Glass as Pierre Calmine
- Jeanne Helbling as Denise Vernon
- Margot Rousseroy as Yvette
- Raoul Paoli as Flack
- Louis Mercier as Lopez
- Jacques Vanaire as Mayer
- Jacques Jou-Jerville as Wellmore
- Frank O'Neill as Lucien
- Émile Chautard as Padre
- André Ferrier as Blancart
- George Davis as Pepin

== Bibliography ==
- Solomon, Aubrey. The Fox Film Corporation, 1915-1935. A History and Filmography. McFarland & Co, 2011.
