= Surcouf (film) =

1925 film

- Directed by: Luitz-Morat
- Written by: Arthur Bernède; Charles Cunat (novel)
- Starring: Jean Angelo; María Dalbaicín; Thomy Bourdelle
- Cinematography: Franck Daniau; Karémine Mérobian
- Production company: Société des Cinéromans
- Distributed by: Pathé Consortium Cinéma
- Release date: 13 February 1925
- Running time: 8 episodes
- Country: France
- Languages: Silent; French intertitles

Surcouf is a 1924 French silent adventure film serial directed by Luitz-Morat and starring Jean Angelo, María Dalbaicín and Thomy Bourdelle. It is loosely based on the life of the eighteenth century privateer Robert Surcouf. Its initial release date was 13 February 1925. The film's sets were designed by the art director Louis Nalpas.

== Main cast ==
- Jean Angelo as Robert Surcouf
- María Dalbaicín as Madiana
- Thomy Bourdelle as Marcof
- Pierre Hot as Dutertre
- Jacqueline Blanc as Marie-Catherine
- Johanna Sutter as Tagore
- Antonin Artaud as Jacques Morel, un traitre
- Louis Monfils as Commodore Rewington
- Daniel Mendaille as Bruce
- Émilie Prévost as Madame Surcouf
- Émile Keppens as Le père Surcouf
- Georgette Sorelle as Lady Bruce
- Jean Peyrière as William Pitt

== Bibliography ==
- Klossner, Michael. The Europe of 1500-1815 on Film and Television: A Worldwide Filmography of Over 2550 Works, 1895 Through 2000. McFarland & Company, 2002.
