= Billeting Order =

1932 film

- Directed by: Charles-Félix Tavano
- Written by: Henri Kéroul; Antony Mars; Christian Matras; Georges Monca; Charles-Félix Tavano
- Starring: André Berley; Jeanne Helbling; Georges Melchior
- Cinematography: Christian Matras; Albert Sorgius
- Music by: Henri Goublier
- Production company: Synchro-Ciné
- Release date: 30 September 1932
- Running time: 95 minutes
- Country: France
- Language: French

Billeting Order (French: Le billet de logement) is a 1932 French comedy film directed by Charles-Félix Tavano and starring André Berley, Jeanne Helbling and Georges Melchior. The film's sets were designed by the art director Robert-Jules Garnier. It is based on the 1901 play of the same title by Henri Kéroul and Antony Mars.

== Cast ==
- André Berley as Labourdette
- Jeanne Helbling as Madame veuve Martin
- Lucienne Parizet as Paulette
- Georges Melchior as Le colonel
- Lucien Gallas as Champeaux
- Arielle as Madame Dingois
- Simone Judic as Zulma Martin
- Jeanne de Carol as Madame Savoureux
- Germaine Baron as Paulette Martin
- Pierre Finaly as Dingois
- Pierre Darteuil as L'ordonnance Moulard
- Harry Krimer as Lieutenant de Fréville
- Gustave Hamilton as Frère Dingois
- Albert Broquin as Filerin
- Germaine Brière
- Jean Neyris
- Yvonne Reyville

== Bibliography ==
- Crisp, Colin. Genre, Myth and Convention in the French Cinema, 1929-1939. Indiana University Press, 2002.
