= Georges Melchior =

French actor

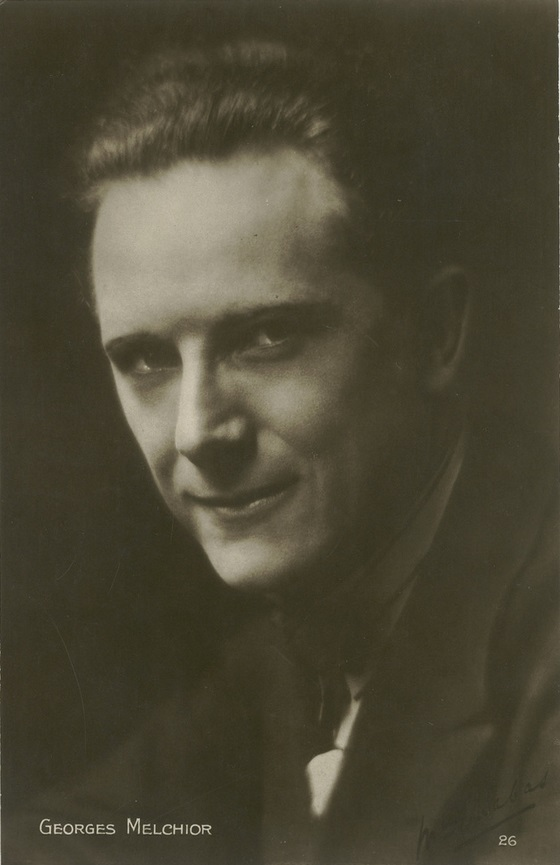
- Born: 15 September 1889; Paris, France
- Died: 2 September 1944 (aged 54); Levallois-Perret, France
- Occupation: Actor
- Years active: 1911-1937

Georges Melchior (15 September 1889 – 2 September 1944) was a French actor of the silent era. He appeared in 67 films between 1911 and 1937.

== Selected filmography ==
- Fantômas (1913)
- L'Atlantide (1921)
- The Clairvoyant (1924)
- My Priest Among the Rich (1925)
- Le p'tit Parigot (1926)
- The Temple of Shadows (1927)
- Siren of the Tropics (1927)
- The Dying Land (1927)
- House in the Sun (1929)
- Sister of Mercy (1929)
- For an Evening (1931)
- Billeting Order (1932)
- The Citadel of Silence (1937)
