= The Clairvoyant (1924 film) =

1924 film

- Directed by: Leon Abrams
- Written by: Sacha Guitry (play)
- Starring: Sarah Bernhardt; Georges Melchior; Harry Baur
- Cinematography: Raymond Agnel; Alphonse Gibory
- Production company: Abdoré
- Distributed by: Etablissements Georges Petit
- Release date: 31 October 1924
- Country: France
- Languages: Silent; French intertitles

The Clairvoyant (French: La voyante) is a 1924 French silent drama film directed by Leon Abrams and starring Sarah Bernhardt, Georges Melchior and Harry Baur. It was based on a play by Sacha Guitry. This was the final film of the celebrated stage actress Sarah Bernhardt who died during production.

== Plot ==
Jean is thrown out of the house by his father, a remarried politician, out of jealousy for his friendship with his mother-in-law. He finds refuge at an artist's apartment. In the same building lives a famous fortune teller that the mother-in-law just happens to consult. With her help, Jean will be able to marry his young sweetheart and his father will solve his political troubles.

== Cast ==
- Sarah Bernhardt as Madame Gainard
- Georges Melchior as Jean Detaille
- Harry Baur as Monsieur Detaille
- Mary Marquet as Madame Detaille
- Jean-François Martial as André Renaud
- Lili Damita as Suzanne
- Pâquerette as the concierge
- Jeanne Brindeau as Madame Gainard's double
- Sacha Guitry
- Paul Poiret as couturier
- Philippe Richard as André Renaud
- Jean Wells

== Bibliography ==
- David W. Menefee. The First Female Stars: Women of the Silent Era. Greenwood Publishing Group, 2004.
