= Georges Tourreil =

French actor

- Born: Georges Louis Cottu; September 7, 1894; Paris, France
- Died: June 16, 1960 (aged 65); Paris, France
- Resting place: Cimetière de Saint-Maur-des-Fossés
- Occupation: Actor
- Years active: 1927–1958

Georges Louis Cottu (known as Georges Tourreil; September 7, 1894 – June 16, 1960) was a French actor.

He was buried in the Saint-Maur-des-Fossés cemetery.

== Filmography ==
=== Cinema ===
- 1927: In Old Stamboul by Roger Goupillières – Alcide Malaric
- 1928: La venenosa by Roger Lion – Masetti
- 1929: Un soir au cocktail's bar by Roger Lion – Short film – A bartender
- 1930: Eau, gaz et amour à tous les étages by Roger Lion – Short film
- 1930: Marius à Paris by Roger Lion – Short film – Florida's manager
- 1931: En bordée by Henry Wulschleger and Joe Francis – Lieutenant Alain de Perdignac
- 1931: Passeport 13.444 by Léon Mathot
- 1931: Kameradschaft by Georg Wilhelm Pabst and Robert Beaudoin – The engineer
- 1932: L'Atlantide by Georg Wilhelm Pabst – Lieutenant Ferrières
- 1932: L'Atlantide (German version) by Georg Wilhelm Pabst – Lieutenant Ferrières
- 1932: The Mistress of Atlantis (English version) by Georg Wilhelm Pabst – Lieutenant Ferrières
- 1932: The Three Musketeers by Henri Diamant-Berger – Two-part film
- 1933: The Testament of Dr. Mabuse by Fritz Lang and René Sti
- 1933: La Voix du métal / L'Appel de la nuit by Youly Marca-Rosa
- 1934: Le Billet de mille by Marc Didier
- 1934: L'Or by Karl Hartl and Serge de Poligny – A secretary
- 1935: Golgotha by Julien Duvivier – A disciple
- 1935: La Marmaille by Bernard Deschamp
- 1936: L'Argent by Pierre Billon
- 1936: Monsieur Personne by Christian-Jaque – The detective
- 1936: Les Petites Alliées by Jean Dréville – Riveral
- 1936: Rigolboche / Reine de Paris by Christian-Jaque
- 1937: The Call of Life by Georges Neveux
- 1937: Rail Pirates by Christian-Jaque – Teyssère
- 1938: Alert in the Mediterranean by Léo Joannon – The Spahis officer
- 1938: Fort Dolorès by René Le Hénaff
- 1939: Entente cordiale by Marcel L'Herbier – Captain Marchand
- 1942: Le Destin fabuleux de Désirée Clary by Sacha Guitry – Cambronne
- 1942: Carmen by Christian-Jaque – Dancaire
- 1944: The Bellman by Christian-Jaque – The brigadier
- 1945: Boule de Suif by Christian-Jaque – The leader of the Franc-Tireurs
- 1946: The Adventures of Casanova by Jean Boyer – Two-part film – Piquebise
- 1946: The Sea Rose by Jacques de Baroncelli – Mouchel
- 1947: Mademoiselle Has Fun by Jean Boyer – The commissioner
- 1948: The Idol by Alexandre Esway
- 1948: Man to Men by Christian-Jaque – A French officer
- 1949: Amédée by Gilles Grangier – An inspector
- 1949: Monseigneur by Roger Richebé – A marquis
- 1952: Alone in the World by René Chanas – The president of the court
- 1952: The Damned Lovers by Willy Rozier
- 1952: Monsieur Leguignon, Signalman by Maurice Labro – The deputy prosecutor
- 1952: Adorable Creatures by Christian-Jaque
- 1955: If All the Guys in the World by Christian-Jaque
- 1958: Prisonniers de la brousse by Willy Rozier

=== Theatre ===
- 1952: Feu d'artifice, operetta by Erik Charell and Jürg Amstein, adapted by Jean Boyer and Pierre Destailles, directed by Erik Charell, with music by Paul Burkhard, performed at Théâtre Marigny (March 1, 1952)
- 1952: Velca, a play by Tullio Pinelli, adapted and directed by José Quaglio, with music by Georges Delerue, performed at Théâtre de Babylone (October 15, 1952)
- 1953: La Maison brûlée, a two-act drama by August Strindberg, translated and adapted by Boris Vian, directed by Franck Sundstrom, performed at Théâtre de Babylone (September 15) – The dyer
