= Raymond Dandy =

French actor

Raymond Dandy (1887–1953) was a French actor.

== Selected filmography ==
- Take Care of Amelie (1932)
- Fifty Fathoms Deep (1932)
- Three Waltzes (1938)
