= Monte Cristo (1929 film) =

1929 film

- Directed by: Henri Fescourt
- Screenplay by: Henri Fescourt
- Based on: The Count of Monte Cristo by Alexandre Dumas
- Produced by: Louis Nalpas
- Starring: Jean Angelo; Lil Dagover; Gaston Modot; Jean Toulout; Henri Debain; Pierre Batcheff; Robert Mérin; Bernhard Goetzke
- Music by: Marc-Olivier Dupin (2006 Arte TV restoration)
- Production company: Films Louis Nalpas
- Distributed by: Terra - United Artists
- Release dates: 25 October 1929 (Part 1); 1 November 1929 (Part 2)
- Running time: 218 minutes
- Country: France
- Languages: Silent (French intertitles)

Monte Cristo (1929), also known as Le Comte de Monte-Cristo in France and The Count of Monte-Cristo in the US, is a French silent film directed by Henri Fescourt, and is a film adaptation of the 1844 novel The Count of Monte Cristo by Alexandre Dumas, père.

Long forgotten, the film underwent a restoration effort from 1999 to 2006 under the direction of Lenny Borger, with funding by the Arte channel. A nearly complete reconstruction was assembled from four prints in Eastern European archives. The restored film received its North American premiere at the San Francisco International Film Festival on 3 May 2015.

Fescourt used four camera operators to best capture movement, and often filmed in real locations mentioned in the novel, including the prison of Chateau d'If. The film has been critically praised as "an epic triumph of the silent cinema at its height," distinguished by its combination of commercial cinema dramatics and techniques used by French impressionist filmmakers (including micro-flashbacks, extreme close-ups, zip-pans, energetic moving camera, and extreme shifts in focus). The BFI's Silent Film Guide writes that "the elegance and orchestration of the film-making is extraordinary" and praises the lavish scenes at the Paris Opera and Monte Cristo's mansion as "staggeringly opulent."

== Plot ==
After greedy men have Edmond Dantes unjustly imprisoned for 20 years for innocently delivering a letter entrusted to him, he escapes to get his revenge on them.

== Cast ==
- Jean Angelo as Edmond Dantes, Count of Monte Cristo / Abbé Busoni
- Lil Dagover as Mercedes, Countess de Morcerf
- Gaston Modot as Fernand Mondego, Count de Morcerf
- Jean Toulout as Monsieur de Villefort
- Marie Glory as Valentine de Villefort
- Michèle Verly as Julie Morrel
- Pierre Batcheff as Albert de Morcerf
- Tamara Stezenko as Haydée
- François Rozet as Maximilien Morrel
- Germaine Kerjean as La Carconte
- Henri Debain as Caderousse
- Robert Mérin as Benedetto / Andrea Calvacanti
- Ernest Maupain as Monsieur Morrel
- Bernhard Goetzke as Abbe Faria
- Armand Pouget as Dantes' father

== See also ==
- 1929 in film
