= André Berley =

French actor (1890–1936)

André Berley (13 January 1890 – 26 November 1936) was a French actor.

Berley was born André Edmond Obrecht in the 6th arrondissement of Paris.

== Selected filmography ==
- The Passion of Joan of Arc (1928)
- Olimpia (1930)
- The Playboy of Paris (1930)
- The Big House (1930)
- A Lady Morals (1930)
- Une audition mouvementée (1931)
- Parlor, Bedroom and Bath (1931)
- Der kleine Seitensprung (1931)
- The Bachelor Father (1931)
- The Little Cafe (1931) – Pierre Bourdin
- Jenny Lind (1932)
- La Perle (1932)
- Coquin de sort (1932)
- The Berley Brothers Boogie (1932)
- Prisonnier de mon cœur (1932)
- Avec l'assurance (1932)
- Billeting Order (1932)
- Boubouroche (1933)
- Un fil à la patte (1933)
- Le Martyre de l'obèse (1933)
- La Prison de Saint-Clothaire (1933)
- Caravan (1934)
- The Typist Gets Married (1934)
- His Excellency Antonin (1935)
- Juanita (1935)
- The Mutiny of the Elsinore (1936)
- Bout de chou (1935)
- Le Grand Pari (1935)
- Folies-Bergère de Paris (1935)
- Three Days Leave (1936)
- Toi c'est moi (1936) – Pedro Hernandez
- Monsieur Personne (1936)
- L'Emprenite rouge (1937)
- The House Opposite (1937)
- À minuit, le 7 (1937)
- La Course à la vertu (1937)
