= For an Evening =

1931 film

- Directed by: Jean Godard
- Written by: Robert de Lisle
- Produced by: Dony Frères
- Starring: Jean Gabin; Colette Darfeuil; Georges Melchior
- Production company: Union des Producteurs de Films
- Distributed by: Victoria Cinéma
- Release date: 12 January 1934
- Running time: 77 minutes
- Country: France
- Language: French

For an Evening (French: Pour un soir) is a 1931 French drama film directed by Jean Godard and starring Jean Gabin, Colette Darfeuil and Georges Melchior. The film's full release was significantly delayed and only reached cinemas in early 1934. Some scenes were shot at the Le Lido cabaret, then at its pre-war location on the Champs-Élysées.

== Synopsis ==
A sailor on shore leave from Toulon encounters a Parisian singer on holiday in St Tropez. They begin a romance but for her it is just a casual adventure while he becomes obsessed with her in a downward spiral that eventually leads him to commit suicide.

== Cast ==
- Colette Darfeuil as Stella Maris
- Jean Gabin as Jean
- Georges Melchior
- Guy Ferrant
- Cilly Andersen
- Jacqueline Ford
- Régine Dhally

== Bibliography ==
- Harriss, Joseph. Jean Gabin: The Actor Who Was France. McFarland, 2018.
