= Goodbye Vienna =

1939 film

- Directed by: Jacques Séverac
- Written by: Claude Gével; Herbert Selpin
- Starring: Gustav Fröhlich; Lee Parry; Rolla Norman
- Cinematography: Alphonse Lucas
- Music by: Johann Strauss Sr. Johann Strauss II
- Production company: Les Grandes Exclusivités Européennes
- Release date: 22 December 1939
- Running time: 94 minutes
- Country: France
- Language: French

Goodbye Vienna (French: Adieu Vienne) is a 1939 French musical film directed by Jacques Séverac and starring Gustav Fröhlich, Lee Parry and Rolla Norman. It received a very limited release, possibly due to the outbreak of the Second World War.

== Synopsis ==
An Austrian exile living in Paris encounters Lisl, a fellow countrymen, who is singing in a cabaret. He recounts the story of Johann Strauss and his father.

== Cast ==
- Gustav Fröhlich as Franz Mansfield
- Lee Parry as Lisl Heinzel
- Rolla Norman
- Edith Gallia
- Françoise Christian
- Claire Vervin
- Jacques Maurice
- Gaby Rio
- Francine Roche
- Michèle Roger

== Bibliography ==
- Bessy, Maurice & Chirat, Raymond. Histoire du cinéma français: encyclopédie des films, Volume 2. Pygmalion, 1986.
- Crisp, Colin. Genre, Myth and Convention in the French Cinema, 1929-1939. Indiana University Press, 2002.
- Rège, Philippe. Encyclopedia of French Film Directors, Volume 1. Scarecrow Press, 2009.
