= Counter Investigation (1930 film) =

1930 film

- Directed by: John Daumery
- Written by: André Chotin; George Kibbe Turner
- Starring: Daniel Mendaille; Suzy Vernon; Jeanne Helbling
- Production company: Warner Bros.
- Distributed by: Warner Bros.
- Release date: December 5, 1930
- Running time: 70 minutes
- Country: United States
- Language: French

Counter Investigation (French: Contre-enquête) is 1930 crime film directed by John Daumery and starring Daniel Mendaille, Suzy Vernon and Jeanne Helbling. It was made by Warner Brothers as the French-language version of their film Those Who Dance. Such multiple-language versions were common during the early years of sound before dubbing became more widespread. It was made at the company's Burbank Studios in California and shot using Vitaphone.

== Cast ==
- Daniel Mendaille as Diamond Joe
- Suzy Vernon as Suzy
- Jeanne Helbling as Betty
- Georges Mauloy as Benson
- Rolla Norman as Dan
- Louis Mercier as Tonio
- Frank O'Neill as Fred
- Emile Chautard as O'Brien

== Bibliography ==
- Liebman, Roy. Vitaphone Films: A Catalogue of the Features and Shorts. McFarland, 2003.
- Waldman, Harry. Missing Reels: Lost Films of American and European Cinema. McFarland, 2000.
