= The House of Mystery (1933 film) =

1933 film

- Directed by: Gaston Roudès
- Written by: Jules Mary; Gaston Roudès
- Starring: Jacques Varennes; Blanche Montel; Rolla Norman
- Cinematography: André Bac; Scarciafico Hugo; François Timmory
- Edited by: Andrée Feix
- Music by: Paddy
- Release date: 1933
- Country: France
- Language: French

The House of Mystery (French: La maison du mystère) is a 1933 French crime film directed by Gaston Roudès and starring Jacques Varennes, Blanche Montel and Rolla Norman. It is a remake of the 1923 silent film The House of Mystery.

== Cast ==
- Jacques Varennes as Henri Corradin
- Blanche Montel as Régine Villandrit
- Rolla Norman as Julien Villandrit
- Alice Beylat as La générale
- Antoine Balpêtré as Rudeberg
- Monique Povel as La petite Christiane
- Georges Mauloy as Marjory
- Jacques Berlioz as Le général de Bettigny
- Henry Houry as Le commissaire
- Jean Pâqui as Pascal
- Marcelle Gilda as La femme de chambre
- Crista Dorra
- Luzia
- Blanche Mauloy

== Bibliography ==
- Crisp, Colin. Genre, Myth and Convention in the French Cinema, 1929-1939. Indiana University Press, 2002.
