= Colomba (1933 film) =

1933 film

- Directed by: Jacques Séverac
- Based on: Colomba by Prosper Mérimée
- Produced by: M. de Montesquiou-Fezensac
- Starring: Genica Athanasiou; Jean Angelo; Josette Day
- Cinematography: Jean Isnard
- Music by: Henri Casadesus
- Production company: Compagnie Autonome de Cinématographie
- Distributed by: Cinédis
- Release date: 10 November 1933
- Running time: 80 minutes
- Country: France
- Language: French

Colomba is a 1933 French historical drama film directed by Jacques Séverac and starring Genica Athanasiou, Jean Angelo and Josette Day. It is an adaptation of the 1840 novel of the same title by Prosper Mérimée. The film's sets were designed by the art director Jean Lafitte.

== Cast ==
- Genica Athanasiou as Colomba della Rebbia
- Jean Angelo as le lieutenant demi-solde Orso della Rebbia
- Josette Day as Miss Lydia
- Gaston Modot as Brando Savelli
- Jacques Henley as Le colonel Sir Thomas Nevil
- Raymond Cordy as Giocanto Vastriconi
- Poussard as Orlanduccio
- Mireille de Telder as Chilina
- Georges Térof as Le préfet
- François Viguier as L'avocat Barricini

== Bibliography ==
- Bessy, Maurice & Chirat, Raymond. Histoire du cinéma français: 1929-1934. Pygmalion, 1986.
- Crisp, Colin. Genre, Myth and Convention in the French Cinema, 1929-1939. Indiana University Press, 2002.
- Goble, Alan. The Complete Index to Literary Sources in Film. Walter de Gruyter, 1999.
- Rège, Philippe. Encyclopedia of French Film Directors, Volume 1. Scarecrow Press, 2009.
