= Daniel Mendaille =

French actor (1885–1963)

- Born: Daniel Henri Élie Mendaille; 27 November 1885; Tours, France
- Died: 17 May 1963 (aged 77); Couilly-Pont-aux-Dames, France
- Other name: D. Mendaille
- Occupation: Actor
- Years active: 1905–1959
- Spouse: Leda Ginelly

Daniel Mendaille (27 November 1885 – 17 May 1963) was a French stage and film actor whose career spanned nearly sixty years.

== Early life ==
Born Daniel Henri Élie Mendaille in Tours, Indre-et-Loire, Mendaille studied architecture at the Académie royale d'architecture, Institut de France in Paris. At age twenty, he abandoned his studies in architecture and enrolled in the Conservatoire de Paris and studied acting under Paul Mounet. After graduating, he was engaged at the Théâtre des Variétés, Cirque d'Hiver, Théâtre Antoine and the l’Œuvre et de la Renaissance.

== Film career ==
During the early 1900s, he began appearing in small roles in film. One of his first roles was in the 1909 Albert Capellani-directed short La mort du duc d'Enghien en 1804 (English release title: The Death of the Duc d'Enghien) for the Société Cinématographique des Auteurs et Gens de Lettres (SCAGL), affiliated with Pathé-Frères

Mendaille continued to work in theater and film throughout the 1910s and 1920s. Already a featured actor, he began performing in leading roles in such films as Léon Poirier's in Le coffret de jade (1921), Marcel Dumont's La proie (1921) and Robert Péguy's Le crime de Monique (1922). In 1923, he portrayed the Comte de Maupry in L'affaire du courrier de Lyon for Gaumont and was also part of the cast of Surcouf (1924) and Jean Chouan (1925), both serials directed by Luitz-Morat. In 1927 he appeared in the epic silent French historical film Napoléon directed by Abel Gance and the following year in the World War I silent docudrama Verdun: Visions of History opposite Albert Préjean, Suzanne Bianchetti, Berthe Jalabert and Antonin Artaud.

Daniel Mendaille had little difficulty transitioning to the sound era of films. Notable performances of the 1930s include the portrayal of a miner in Georg Wilhelm Pabst's La tragédie de la mine (1931), the French-language version of Fritz Lang's The Testament of Dr. Mabuse (1933), a diplomat in Alexis Granowsky's Moscow Nights opposite French actress Annabella (1934), as Gaston Roude in the first film adaptation of Émile Zola's L'Assommoir (1933) and as Micheletto, the chief henchman in Abel Gance's historical drama Lucrèce Borgia (1935).

Throughout the 1940s and 1950s, Mendaille would often be relegated to supporting roles as a character actor or in bit parts, with notable performances in such films as Jacques Becker's Casque d'Or (1952), Max Ophüls' The Earrings of Madame de… (1953), Christian-Jaque's adaptation of Émile Zola's Nana (1955) and Max Ophüls' Lola Montès (1955). Mendaille appeared in approximately 120 films.

== Personal life ==
Daniel Mendaille was married to Spanish-born actress Leda Ginelly. Following Ginelly's death in April 1959, he retired from performing and lived a secluded life at the family residence in Couilly-Pont-aux-Dames, where he died in May 1963 at age 77.

== Selected filmography ==
- La mort du duc d'Enghien (1912)
- Le Coffret de jade (1921) - Akmet-le-Bandit
- La proie (1921)
- Le crime de Monique (1922) - Jean Vorel
- L'Affaire du courrier de Lyon (1923) - Le comte de Maupry
- L'espionne (1923) - Le lieutenant de vaisseau André de Maurillac - le mari de Dora
- Les deux soldats (1923) - Henri Massaguel
- La cabane d'amour (1923) - Roustille
- La goutte de sang (1924) - Le juge d'instruction
- L'ironie du sort (1924) - Bazeil
- The City Destroyed (1924) - Richard Gallée
- Surcouf (1925) - Bruce
- La course du flambeau (1925) - Stangey
- Jean Chouan (1926) - François Marceau
- En plongée (1926) - Maurice de Vergnes - un officier de marine
- Colette the Unwanted (1927) - Le père Duboin-Larbeuil
- Napoléon (1927) - Fréron (uncredited)
- The Crew (1928) - Deschamps
- Verdun: Visions of History (1928) - Le mari
- Le film du poilu (1928) - Marcel Lambert
- Captain Fracasse (1929) - Agostin
- Saint Joan the Maid (1929) - Lord Talbot
- The Shark (1930) - Le second
- Lopez, le bandit (1930) - L'oncle
- Counter Investigation (1930) - Diamond Joe
- Salto Mortale (1931) - Jim
- Verdun, souvenirs d'histoire (1931) - Le mari
- Kameradschaft (1931) - Jean Leclerc
- Ceux du viking (1932) - Jeff
- Criminal (1933) - Galloway
- The Testament of Dr. Mabuse (1933) - Bredow
- La voie sans disque (1933) - Nicolaï
- La Roche aux mouettes (1933) - Le Goff
- L'assommoir (1933) - Coupeau
- The Red Robe (1933) - Etchepare
- L'indésirable (1933)
- The Bread Peddler (1934) - Soliveau
- Moscow Nights (1934) - Un diplomate (uncredited)
- Maria Chapdelaine (1934) - Le curé
- The Decoy (1935) - Le premier officier
- The Devil in the Bottle (1935) - Jerry
- Napoléon Bonaparte (1935) - Feron (uncredited)
- L'heureuse aventure (1935) - Rémondy
- The Crew (1935) - Deschamps
- Adémaï in the Middle Ages (1935) - Un chevalier
- Lucrezia Borgia (1935) - Micheletto, chief henchman
- A Legionnaire (1936) - Charlin
- Enfants de Paris (1937)
- People Who Travel (1938) - Jo
- Le tigre du Bengale (1938)
- Le tombeau hindou (1938)
- Stolen Life (1939) - Old Pauliac
- Une main a frappé (1939) - Martial
- Les 3 tambours (1939) - Kellermann
- Parade en 7 nuits (1941)
- L'auberge de l'abîme (1943) - Palihan
- The Heart of a Nation (1943) - Clémenceau
- 120, rue de la Gare (1946) - Georges Parry
- Le Bataillon du ciel (1947) - Baron de Brandoz
- Les trafiquants de la mer (1947) - Le capitaine Lacoumé
- La Révoltée (1948) - Le confesseur
- Le secret de Mayerling (1949) - (uncredited)
- Maya (1949) - Le directeur du bureau de navigation
- Le furet (1950)
- Le Crime des justes (1950) - Le garde
- Véronique (1950) - Le directeur de la prison
- Pigalle-Saint-Germain-des-Prés (1950) - Le directeur de la P.J.
- The Convict (1951) - Le chef de la plantation
- The Dream of Andalusia (1951) - Doctor (uncredited)
- Under the Sky of Paris (1951) - Un examinateur (uncredited)
- Casque d'Or (1952) - Le patron de la guinguette / Guinguette
- We Are All Murderers (1952) - Un gardien
- Le jugement de Dieu (1952)
- Deux de l'escadrille (1953)
- The Lottery of Happiness (1953)
- The Earrings of Madame de… (1953) - Un passant (uncredited)
- Le Guérisseur (1953)
- The Unfrocked One (1954) - Un officier
- La Chair et le Diable (1954) - Le colporteur
- On Trial (1954) - (uncredited)
- Sur le banc (1954) - (uncredited)
- Le vicomte de Bragelonne (1954) - (uncredited)
- Les deux font la paire (1954) - (uncredited)
- Master of Life and Death (1955) - Monsieur Kerbrec
- Rififi (1955) - Lookout
- Nana (1955) - Le valet (uncredited)
- Lola Montès (1955) - Captain (uncredited)
- Maid in Paris (1956)
- I'll Get Back to Kandara (1956)
- Les violents (1957) - Le patron du bistrot
- Échec au porteur (1958) - Petit rôle (uncredited)
- Sinners of Paris (1958) - Un ami du Fondu
- Police judiciaire (1958) - Vallard (uncredited)
- Montparnasse 19 (1958) - Le professeur (uncredited)
- The Cat (1958) - (uncredited)
- Madame et son auto (1958) - Petit (final film role)
