= Tela Tchaï =

- Born: Martha Noémi Famin; August 10, 1909; Roubaix, France
- Died: July 15, 1993 (aged 83); Saint-Tropez, France
- Occupations: Actress, painter, model, dancer
- Notable work: L'Atlantide, Les Mystères de Paris, Farandole

Martha Noémi Winterstein (née Famin; known as Tela Tchaï; August 10, 1909 – July 15, 1993) was a French actress, painter, model, and dancer of Romani origin.

== Biography ==
Tela Tchaï was born and raised in Roubaix. She was a model for several painters, including André Derain. As an actress, she starred in a dozen films, before becoming a painter herself. One of her paintings, entitled Bouquet de fleurs, was acquired in 2019 by the La Piscine Museum.

== Filmography ==
- 1932: L'Atlantide by Georg Wilhelm Pabst: Tanit Zerga
- 1932: Gitanes / Les Deux routes, by Jacques de Baroncelli: Tela-Tchaï
- 1932: Bolero by Max Reichmann
- 1934: Roi de Camargue by Jacques de Baroncelli: Zinzara
- 1937: La Symphonie des brigands / Peppino by Friedrich Fehér: the servant
- 1937: Les Secrets de la mer Rouge by Richard Pottier: Sultana
- 1939: Tourelle 3, unfinished film by Christian-Jaque: Mayena
- 1943: Les Mystères de Paris by Jacques de Baroncelli: La Punaise
- 1945: Farandole by André Zwobada: the fortune teller

== Bibliography ==
- Gérard Gartner: Les sept plasticiens précurseurs tsiganes. Otto Mueller – Serge Poliakoff – Helios Gomez – Tela Tchaï – Django Reinhardt – Constantin Nepo – Yana Rondolotto, Marinoel editions, Paris, 2011.
- Germain Hirselj, "Tela Tchaï, la vamp des grands chemins", in People and stones of Roubaix, No. 31, November 2021, p.14-23.
