= The Great Passion =

1928 film

- German release poster
- Directed by: André Hugon
- Written by: Octave Léry (novel)
- Starring: Lil Dagover; Rolla Norman; Patricia Allen
- Cinematography: René Colas; Maurice Guillemin
- Production company: Films André Hugon
- Distributed by: Bavaria Film (Germany)
- Release date: 21 December 1928
- Running time: 80 minutes
- Country: France
- Languages: Silent; French intertitles

The Great Passion (French: La grande passion) is a 1928 French silent drama film directed by André Hugon and starring Lil Dagover, Rolla Norman and Patricia Allen. The film's sets were designed by the art director Christian-Jaque.

== Cast ==
- Lil Dagover as Sonia de Blich
- Rolla Norman as Jean d'Espoey
- Patricia Allon as Harriett Bush
- Paul Menant as Rétifat
- Léon Larive as Etchenoga
- Acho Chakatouny as Mr. Bush
- Jean Delannoy as Patrick Bush
- Adolphe Jauréguy as Captain of the French rugby team

== Bibliography ==
- Dayna Oscherwitz & MaryEllen Higgins. The A to Z of French Cinema. Scarecrow Press, 2009.
