= Children of the Sun (1962 film) =

1962 film

- Directed by: Jacques Séverac
- Written by: David Dayan
- Starring: Abdelkader Abderrahmane
- Cinematography: Jacques Klein
- Edited by: Jacques Mavel
- Release date: 1962
- Running time: 185 minutes
- Country: Morocco
- Language: Arabic

Children of the Sun (French: Les Enfants du soleil) is a 1962 Moroccan film directed by Jacques Séverac. It was entered into the 1962 Cannes Film Festival.

== Cast ==
- Abdelkader Abderrahmane
- Aziz Afifi
- Mustapha Brick
- Mohammed Zubir
- Amina Belkahia
- Abdou
- Mohammed Afifi
- Hassan Essakali
- Ahmed Jillali
