= Jeanne Helbling =

French actress (1903–1985)

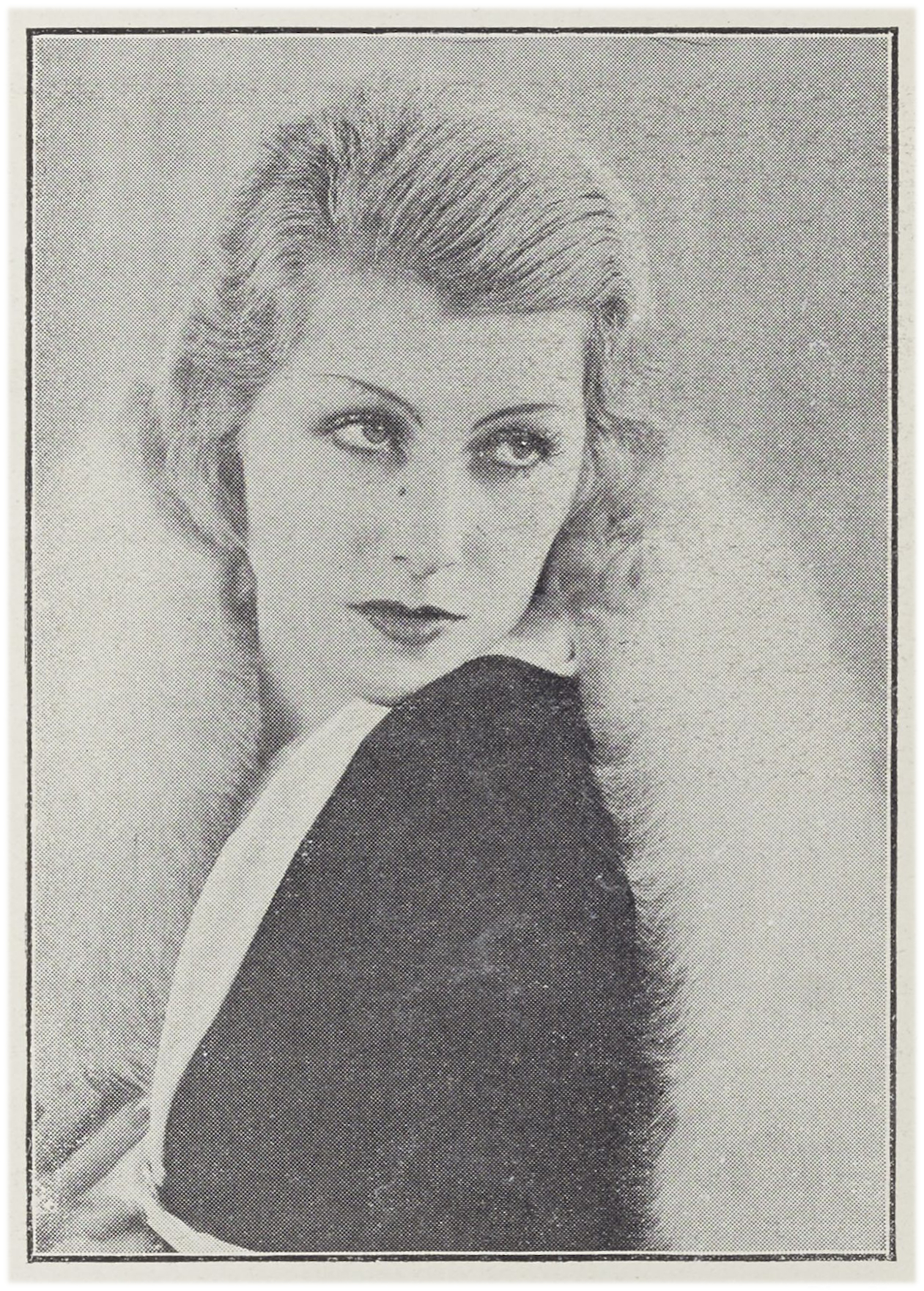
- Born: 26 July 1903; Thann, Haut-Rhin, France
- Died: 6 August 1985 (aged 82); New York, New York, United States
- Occupation: Actress
- Years active: 1922–1946 (film)

Jeanne Helbling (July 26, 1903 – August 6, 1985) was a French film actress and a prominent member of the French Resistance during World War II.

== Selected filmography ==
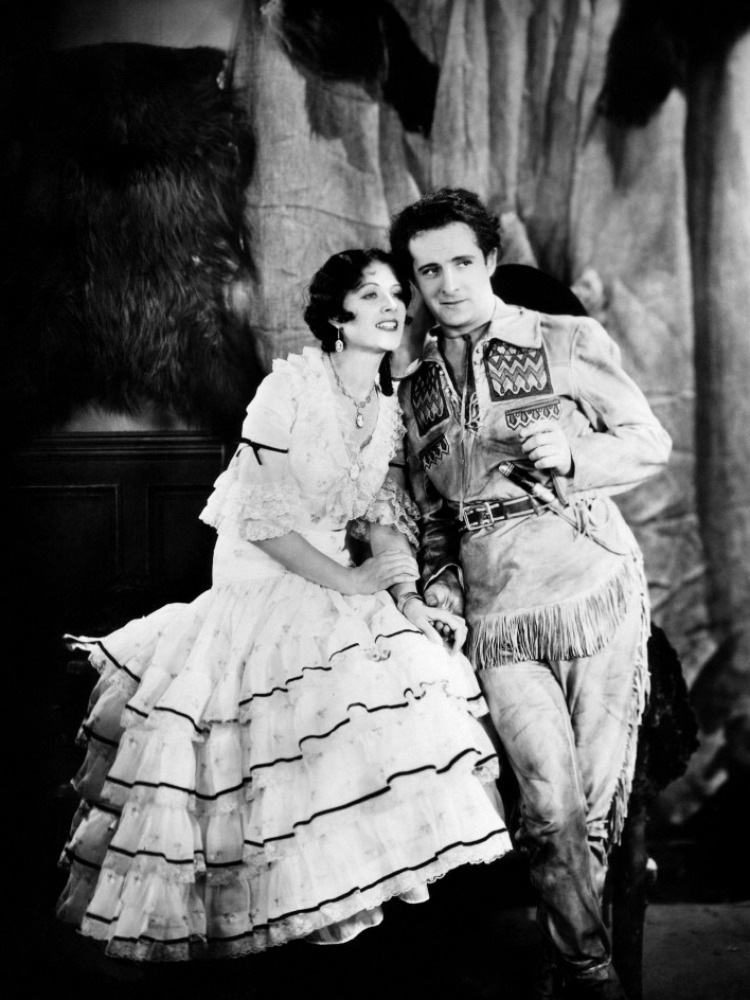
Helbling with Gaston Glass in The Big Trail (1931)

- The Thruster (1924)
- Mandrin (1924)
- Captain Rascasse (1927)
- Behind the Altar (1927)
- The Three-Sided Mirror (1927)
- Mascots (1929)
- The Hero of Every Girl's Dream (1929)
- Counter Investigation (1930)
- The Big Trail (1931)
- Durand Versus Durand (1931)
- Billeting Order (1932)
- Kiss Me (1932)
- Fifty Fathoms Deep (1932)
- The Champion Cook (1932)
- The Crime of Bouif (1933)
- Coralie and Company (1934)
- His Excellency Antonin (1935)
- Helene (1936)
- The Red Dancer (1937)
- Madelon's Daughter (1937)
- Sarati the Terrible (1937)
- Three Waltzes (1938)
- Peace on the Rhine (1938)
- Fire in the Straw (1939)
- The Last Metro (1945)
- Women's Games (1946)

== Bibliography ==
- Goble, Alan. The Complete Index to Literary Sources in Film. Walter de Gruyter, 1999.
