= The Secrets of the Red Sea =

1937 film

- Directed by: Richard Pottier
- Written by: Joseph Kessel; René Pujol; Carlo Rim
- Based on: The Secrets of the Red Sea by Henry de Monfreid
- Starring: Harry Baur; Gaby Basset; Alexandre Mihalesco
- Cinematography: Jean Bachelet
- Edited by: Pierre Méguérian
- Music by: Fred Mélé; Jean Yatove
- Production company: PSB Films
- Release date: 8 September 1937
- Running time: 87 minutes
- Country: France
- Language: French

The Secrets of the Red Sea (French: Les secrets de la Mer Rouge) is a 1937 French adventure film directed by Richard Pottier and starring Harry Baur, Gaby Basset and Alexandre Mihalesco. It was based on the 1931 novel of the same title by Henry de Monfreid. The film's sets were designed by the art director Lucien Aguettand.

== Synopsis ==
Saïd Ali, an elderly Arab, lives on an island in the Red Sea and spends his days collecting pearls. A rival plots to kill him in order to steal his wealth.

== Cast ==
- Harry Baur as Saïd Ali
- Gaby Basset as Anita
- Habib Benglia as Araba
- Auguste Bovério as Kames
- Charles Dechamps as Chouchana
- Édouard Delmont as Soliman
- Slim Driga as Ismaël
- Maximilienne as L'anglaise
- Alexandre Mihalesco as Nadir
- Georges Paulais as Sheik Issa
- Raymond Segard as Sélim
- Tela Tchaï as Sultana

== Bibliography ==
- Christian Gilles. L'avant-guerre, 1937-1939. Harmattan, 2002.
- Jonathan Miran, "Pearling Fortunes: Recovering 'Ali al-Nahari, a Legendary Red Sea Magnate in the Early Twentieth Century," in Pedro Machado, Steve Mullins & Joseph Christensen. Pearls, People, and Power: Pearling and Indian Ocean Worlds. Ohio University Press, 2020.
