= Mascots (1929 film) =

1929 silent film directed by Felix Basch

- German: Mascottchen
- Directed by: Felix Basch
- Written by: Rudolph Cartier; Max Ehrlich; Berthold L. Seidenstein; Curt Siodmak
- Starring: Käthe von Nagy; Jeanne Helbling; Muriel Angelus
- Cinematography: Mutz Greenbaum
- Production company: Greenbaum-Film
- Distributed by: Aafa-Film
- Release date: 17 April 1929
- Country: Germany
- Languages: Silent; German intertitles

Mascots (German: Mascottchen) is a 1929 German silent film directed by Felix Basch and starring Käthe von Nagy, Jeanne Helbling, and Muriel Angelus.

Produced by Greenbaum-Film, Mascots is based on an operetta by Walter Bromme and Georg Okonkowski.

The film's sets were designed by the art directors Otto Erdmann and Hans Sohnle.

== Cast ==
- Käthe von Nagy as Margot, Shop assistant
- Jeanne Helbling as Elvira, Dancer
- Muriel Angelus as Annie, Draftswoman
- Ivan Koval-Samborsky as Paul, Actor
- Kurt Vespermann as Bruno, Musician
- Paul Morgan as Harry, Juggler
- Mikhail Rasumny as Max, Painter
- Max Gülstorff as Theatre Director Kugel
- Hans Albers as Antoine, Rayonchef
- Jakob Tiedtke as Director Lieblich
- Hermann Picha as Civil servant
- Paul Westermeier as Portier
