= Genica Athanasiou =

Romanian-French actress

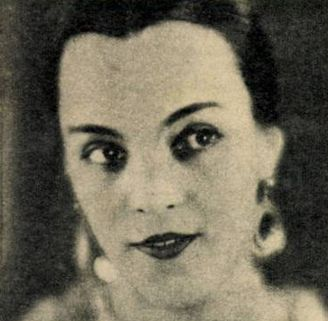
- Born: Eugénie Génica Tanase; 3 January 1897; Bucharest, Kingdom of Romania
- Died: 13 July 1966 (aged 69); Lagny-sur-Marne, Seine-et-Marne, France
- Other name: Ioana Athanasiu
- Occupation: Actress
- Years active: 1925–1962 (film)

Genica Athanasiou (3 January 1897 – 13 July 1966) was a Romanian-French stage and film actress.

== Selected filmography ==
- Count Kostia (1925)
- Misdeal (1928)
- The Seashell and the Clergyman (1928)
- The Lighthouse Keepers (1929)
- Saint Joan the Maid (1929)
- Colomba (1933)
- The Count of Monte Cristo (1954)

== Sources ==
- Laurence Meiffret, Génica Athanasiou, l'anti-muse d'Antonin Artaud, Paris, Non Lieu, 2025.
- Laurence Meiffret, Génica Athanasiou (1897-1966). La Vie passionnée d'une actrice roumaine dans l'avant-garde parisienne / Viata pasionanta a unei actrice romana din avangarda pariziana, Bucarest, Muzeul National al Literaturii Romane, 2019.
- John T. Soister. Conrad Veidt on Screen: A Comprehensive Illustrated Filmography. McFarland, 2002.
