= Monsieur Personne =

1936 film

- Directed by: Christian-Jaque
- Written by: Jean-Henri Blanchon
- Based on: Monsieur Personne by Marcel Allain
- Produced by: Jean-Pierre Frogerais
- Starring: Jules Berry; Josseline Gaël; André Berley
- Cinematography: Marcel Lucien
- Edited by: William Barache
- Music by: Henri Poussigue
- Production company: Productions Sigma
- Distributed by: Les Films Vog
- Release date: 4 December 1936
- Running time: 90 minutes
- Country: France
- Language: French

Monsieur Personne is a 1936 French comedy mystery film directed by Christian-Jaque and starring Jules Berry, Josseline Gaël and André Berley. It was based on the novel of the same title by Marcel Allain. The film's sets were designed by the art director Pierre Schild.

== Cast ==
- Jules Berry as Monsieur Personne
- Josseline Gaël as Josette Verneau
- André Berley as Monsieur Louis
- Jacques Vitry as Paul Perrier
- Jean Kolb as Le capitaine
- Marcel Vidal as Philippe
- Régine Dancourt as Madame Bert
- Anthony Gildès as Maître Monin - le notaire
- Paul Amiot as Le commissaire
- Amy Collin as Marianne de Marcel
- Robert Ozanne as L'inspecteur Chenut
- Henri Marchand as Germain
- Georges Tourreil as Le détective

== Bibliography ==
- Bessy, Maurice & Chirat, Raymond. Histoire du cinéma français: 1935-1939. Pygmalion, 1986.
- Crisp, Colin. Genre, Myth and Convention in the French Cinema, 1929-1939. Indiana University Press, 2002.
- Goble, Alan. The Complete Index to Literary Sources in Film. Walter de Gruyter, 1999.
- Rège, Philippe. Encyclopedia of French Film Directors, Volume 1. Scarecrow Press, 2009.
