= Jean Bertheroy =

French writer (1858–1927)

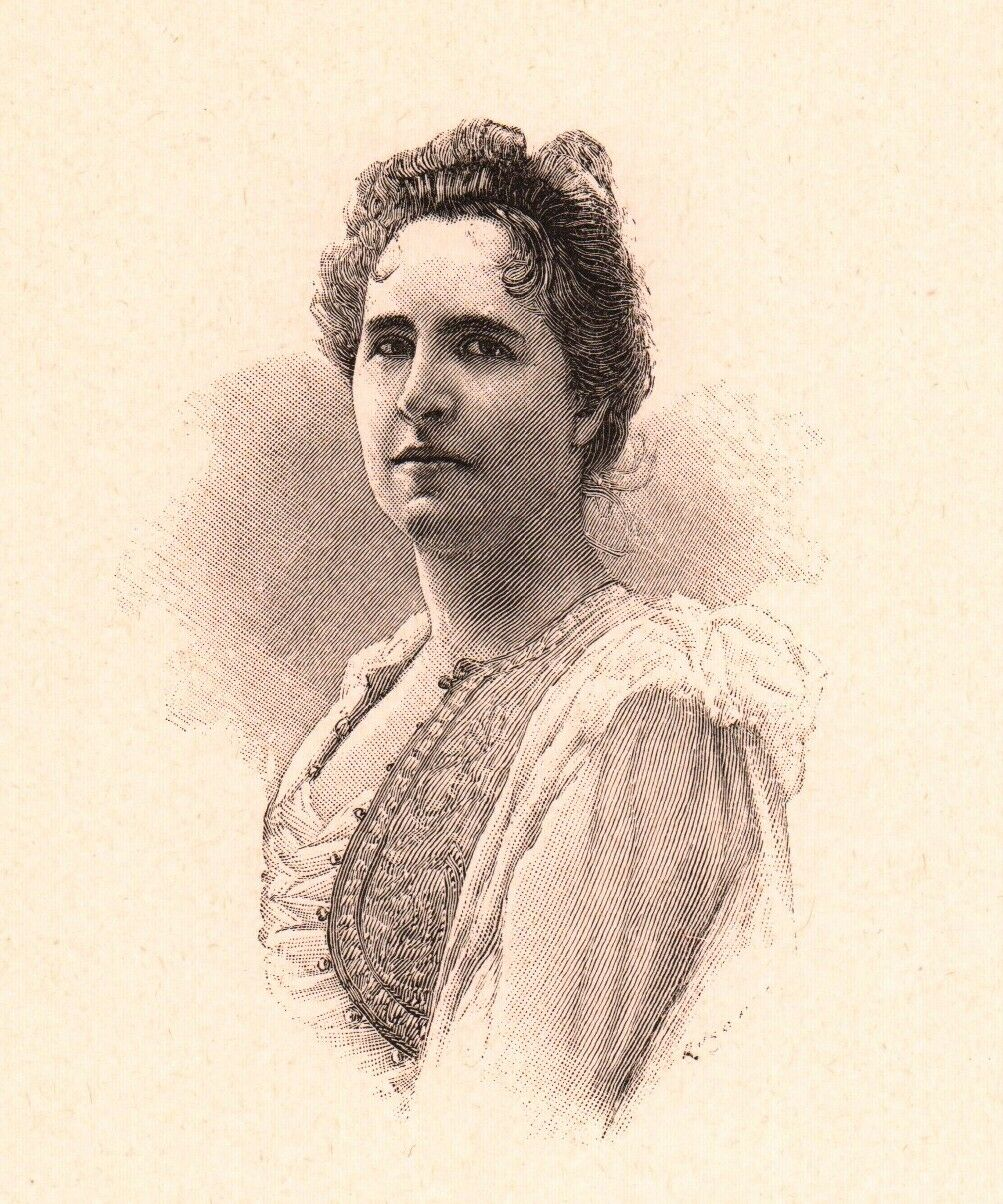
- ca. 1900
- Born: Berthe Jeanne Le Barillier; 24 July 1858; Bordeaux, France
- Died: 24 January 1927 (aged 68); Le Cannet, France
- Occupations: classicist; writer
- Writing career
- Pen name: Jean Bertheroy
- Notable awards: Legion of Honor; Prix Archon-Despérouses; Montyon Prize; Prix d’éloquence

Signature
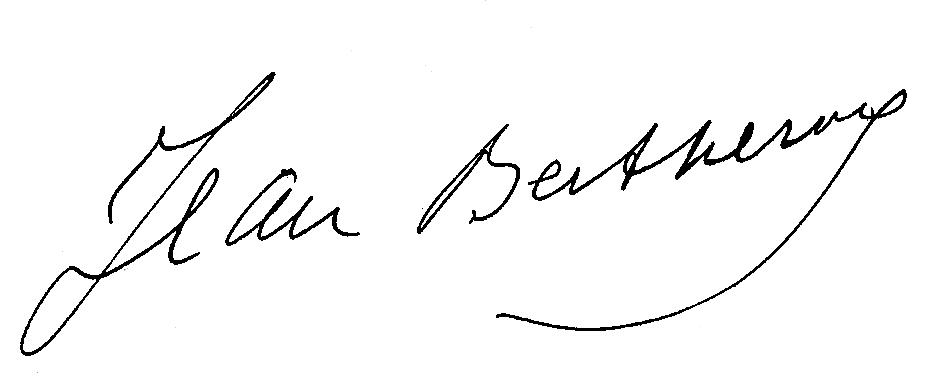

Berthe Jeanne Le Barillier (24 July 1858 – 24 January 1927), known by her pen name Jean Bertheroy, was a French classicist and writer. First noted for her poetry, she turned to the historical novel and then the modern novel. Her work, although largely forgotten, is served by a sober style and very solid documentation. The most substantial part of her work is probably that devoted to Roman antiquity. Bertheroy was a three-time laureate of the Académie Française.

== Early life and education ==
Berthe Jeanne Le Barillier was born in Bordeaux, France, 24 July 1858, to Jeanne Laure Elisabeth Fabre (1830–1900), and Hyacinthe Édouard François Le Barillier (1823–1894),

She was a student of the classics.

== Career ==
Bertheroy became known to the literary world by a book of verse, Les Vibrations, which she published in 1887 under the name of "Jean Bertheroy". Three years later, a second book of verse, Les Femmes antiques, received a prize by the Académie française.

A successful novelist in her time, Bertheroy's novels fell into two categories: modern novels such as Le Roman d'une âme, Double Joug, Sur la Pente, Le Mirage, and Le Rachat; and novels of antiquity, notably Cléopatre, La Danseuse de Pompei, Les Vierges de Syracuse, and La Beauté d'Alcias. Novels of antiquity had been brought into vogue by the Thaïs of Anatole France and the Aphrodite – mœurs antiques of Pierre Louys, in imitation of which many poor ones were written. Bertheroy's, however, are excellent, and the best one of them is probably La Danseuse de Pompei. La Beauté d'Alcias contains admirable descriptions of the Eginian Sea, Megara and Athens. Jean Bertheroy wrote in a musical, harmonious language, mingling the ardor of passion with a strong impulse toward the ideal.

She worked for Le Figaro and the Revue des deux Mondes, was the first secretary of the Prix Femina jury in 1904, and was a member of the Société des gens de lettres. Bertheroy campaigned for the improvement of the status of women.

== Death and legacy ==
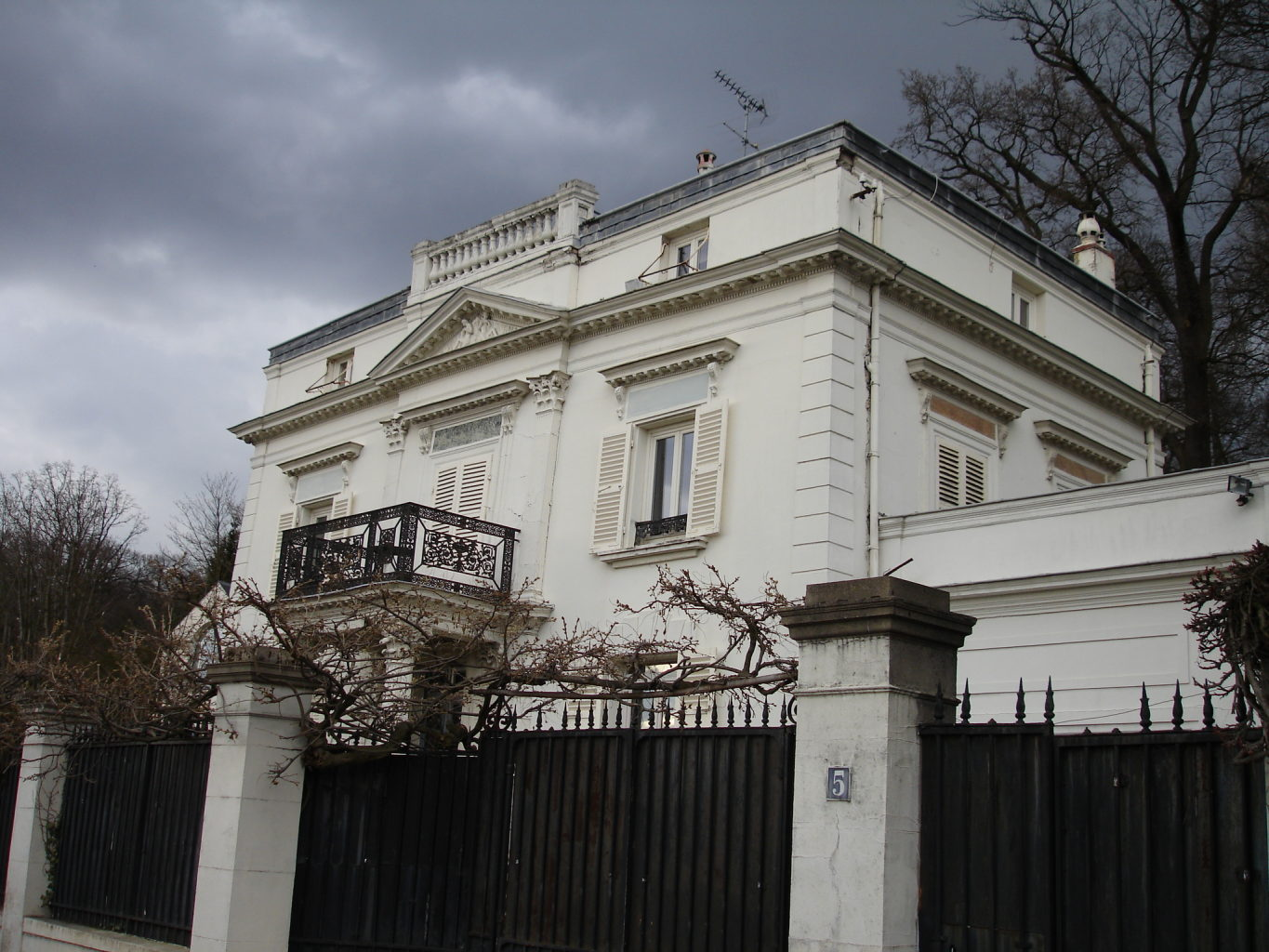
Maison Jean Bertheroy (Montmorency, 2006)

Jean Bertheroy died on January 24, 1927, in Le Cannet, a town where she owned a villa.

Her memory lives on in Montmorency, Val-d'Oise, where she had an Italian-style house built in 1891, at 5 Rue de l'Hermitage, in the immediate vicinity of the Hermitage of Jean-Jacques Rousseau, a writer she admired and wanted to get closer to. This house is sometimes called Hôtel Bertheroy, sometimes Maison Jean Bertheroy.

== Awards and honours ==
- Prizes of the Académie Française

- 1890: Prix Archon-Despérouses for Femmes antiques
- 1894: Montyon Prize, for Ximénès
- 1900: Prix d’éloquence for André Chénier - Dans l’âme du poète, un Dieu même respire

- 1911: Knight, Legion of Honour

== Selected works ==
- Vibrations, poems (1888)
- Marie Madeleine, poem (1889)
- Femmes antiques : la légende, l'histoire, la Bible, poems (1890)
- Cléopâtre, historical novel (1891)
- Aristophane et Molière, 1 act in verse, Paris, Comédie-Française, 15 January 1897 (éd. Paris, Colin, 1891).
- Ximénès, historical novel (1893)
- Le Mime Bathylle, historical novel (1894)
- Le Roman d'une âme, novel (1895)
- Le Double Joug, novel (1897)
- Sur la pente, novel (1897)
- Les Trois Filles de Pieter Waldorp (Pierre Lafitte & Cie, 1897)
- Un vrai ami, comedy in 1 act, co-written with Brandimbourg, Paris, performed at the Grand-Guignol, 25 November 1897
- Cocu, ou la femme de M. Duveau, vaudeville in 1 act, co-written with Habrekon and De Pawlowsky, performed at Divan japonais, 16 September 1899
- La Danseuse de Pompéi (1899); reissued in 1905 (Arthème Fayard)
- Le Journal de Marguerite Plantin (1899)
- Éloge de André Chénier, memoir (1900)
- Lucie Guérin, marquise de Ponts, novel (published as a serial novel in Le Figaro, 4 November 1899 – 15 December 1899; published in one volume by Paul Ollendorf in 1900)
- Hérille, novel (1901)
- Le Rachat (1902)
- Les Vierges de Syracuse (1902)
- Le Mirage, novel (1902)
- Le Jardin des Tolosati (1903)
- Les Dieux familiers, new novel (1904)
- La Beauté d'Alcias, nouveau roman (1905)
- Les Délices de Mantoue, novel (1906)
- Sybaris (1907)
- Geneviève de Paris, historical novel (1907)
- L'Ascension du bonheur, novel (1908)
- Le Colosse de Rhodes (1909)
- Conflit d'âmes, roman (1910)
- Les Deux Puissances, novel (1910)
- Gilles le Ménétrier (1910)
- La Passion d'Héloïse et Abélard (1910)
- La Vie du cœur, short stories (1910)
- Le Frisson sacré, novel (1912)
- Les Chanteurs florentins, suivis de : l'Enfant Septentrion (1912)
- Le Double Amour (1912)
- Aspasie et Phryné, illustrated by Gabriel de Roton (1913)
- Les Tablettes d'Erinna d'Agrigente, novel (1913)
- La Couronne d'épines, novel (1914)
- Le Tourment d'aimer, novel (1914)
- Entre la conscience et le cœur (1916)
- Le Chemin de l'amour, novel (1918)
- Vers la gloire (1919)
- Les Voix du Forum (1920)
- Les Pavots mystiques, novel (1921)
- Amour, où est ta victoire ? novel (1922)
- L'Ange au sourire (1923)
- Roseline et l'amour (1923)
- La Ville des expiations (1923)
- Les Brebis de Mme Deshoulières (1924)
- Dans la barque d'Isis, novel (1925)
- La Vie sublime de Galileo-Galilei (1927)

=== Lyrics ===
- La Terre a mis sa robe blanche (1890), set to music by Théodore Dubois (1837–1924)
- Dans le sentier, parmi les roses (1891), set to music by Jules Massenet (1842–1912)
- Parmi les Roses, poem (1908), melody for voice and piano, set to music by Émile Nerini (1882–1967)
- Chant d'amour, poem, melody for voice and piano, set to music by Henri Maréchal (1842–1924)
