= Rolla Norman =

French actor

Edouard Charles Normand, best known as Rolla Norman, (1889–1971) was a French stage and film actor.

== Selected filmography ==
- The Assassination of the Duke of Guise (1908)
- The Advocate (1925)
- Gribiche (1926)
- The Last Fort (1928)
- The Vein (1928)
- The Great Passion (1928)
- Counter Investigation (1930)
- Checkmate (1931)
- The Yellow Dog (1932)
- Antoinette (1932)
- A Star Disappears (1932)
- The House of Mystery (1933)
- Cease Firing (1934)
- The Mysteries of Paris (1935)
- The Two Boys (1936)
- Peace on the Rhine (1938)
- Goodbye Vienna (1939)
- The Porter from Maxim's (1939)
- Facing Destiny (1940)
- Notre-Dame de la Mouise (1941)
