= Luitz-Morat =

French actor, screenwriter and film director

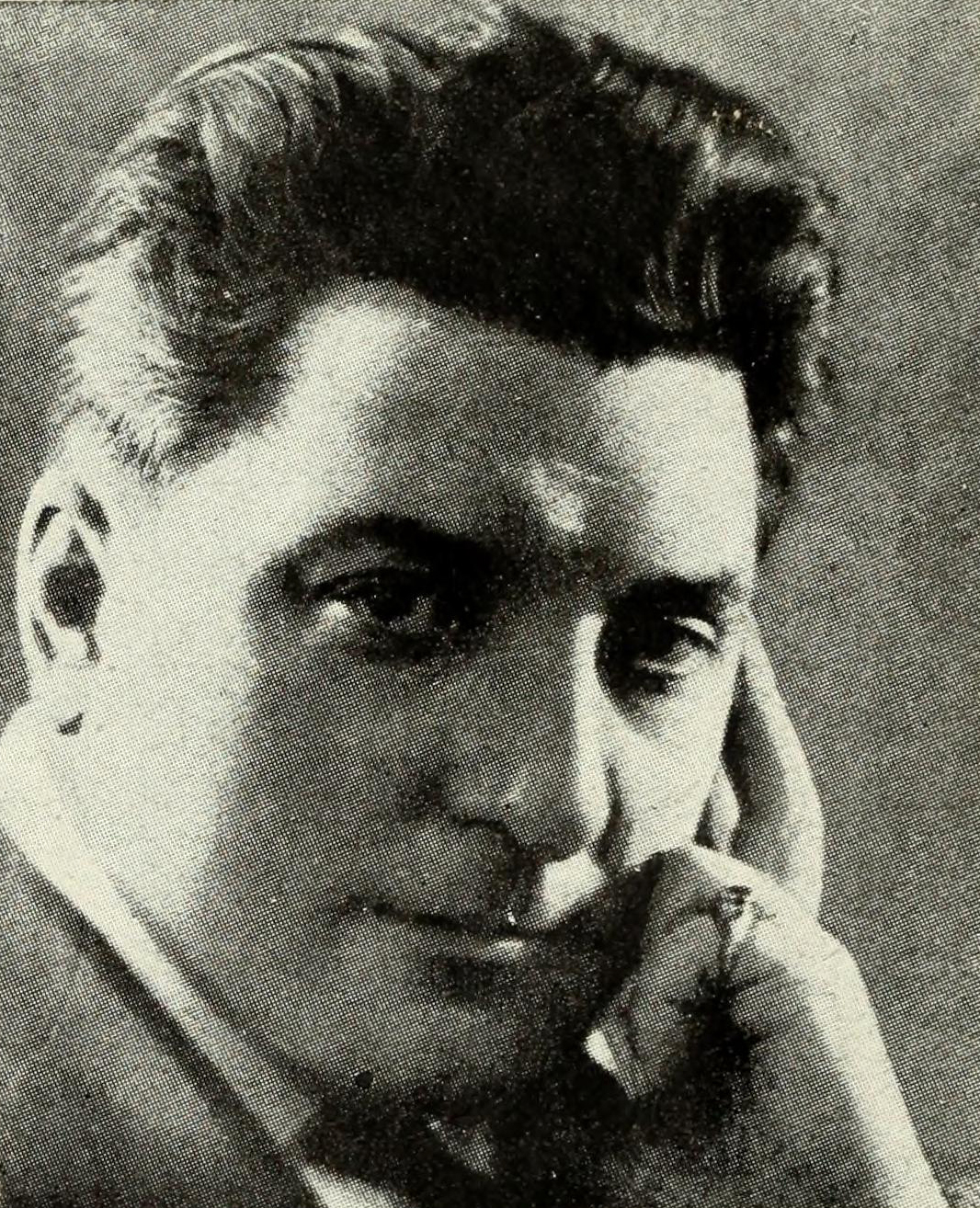
- Born: Maurice Louis Radiguet; 5 June 1884; Paris, France
- Died: 11 August 1929 (aged 45); Paris, France
- Occupations: Actor, Writer, Director
- Years active: 1910-1929 (film)

Luitz-Morat (1884–1929) was a French actor, screenwriter and film director.

== Selected filmography ==
- A Roman Orgy (1911)
- The City Destroyed (1924)
- Surcouf (1925)
- Jean Chouan (1926)
- The Chocolate Girl (1927)
- Odette (1928)
- A Foolish Maiden (1929)

== Bibliography ==
- Dayna Oscherwitz. Past Forward: French Cinema and the Post-Colonial Heritage. SIU Press, 2010.
