= The Mysteries of Paris (1943 film) =

1943 film

- Directed by: Jacques de Baroncelli
- Written by: Eugène Sue (novel); Maurice Bessy; Pierre Laroche
- Produced by: André Paulvé
- Starring: Marcel Herrand; Yolande Laffon; Alexandre Rignault
- Cinematography: Léonce-Henri Burel
- Edited by: Madeleine Bonin
- Music by: Henri Casadesus
- Production company: DisCina
- Distributed by: DisCina
- Release date: 8 September 1943
- Running time: 89 minutes
- Country: France
- Language: French

The Mysteries of Paris (French: Les mystères de Paris) is a 1943 French drama film directed by Jacques de Baroncelli and starring Marcel Herrand, Yolande Laffon and Alexandre Rignault. It is based on the novel The Mysteries of Paris by Eugène Sue.

The film's art direction was by Léon Barsacq.

== Cast ==
- Marcel Herrand as Rodolphe
- Yolande Laffon as La comtesse Sarah Mac Gregor
- Alexandre Rignault as Le Maître d'Ecole
- Lucien Coëdel as Le Chourineur
- Roland Toutain as Cabrion
- Ginette Roy as Rigolette
- Simone Ribaut as Louise Morel
- Claudye Carter as La Louve
- Emma Lyonel as Madame Pipelet
- Lucien Callamand as Monsieur Pipelet
- Alexandre Fabry as Monsieur Morel
- Jean-François Martial as Le mouchard
- Cécilia Paroldi as Fleur de Marie
- Pierre-Louis as Francis
- Albert Gercourt as Maître Ferrand
- Raphaël Patorni as Murph
- Germaine Kerjean as La Chouette
- Jean Carmet
- Raymond Carrel
- Defresne
- Alain Feydeau
- Lucienne Galopaud as La baronne
- Marguerite Guérau as Une boutiquière
- Manoutrel as Une religieuse
- Yvette Maurech
- Marcelle Naudia
- Robert Sidonac as Le policier
- Tela Tchaï as La Punaise
- Claire Vervin as Madame Musard

== Bibliography ==
- Goble, Alan. The Complete Index to Literary Sources in Film. Walter de Gruyter, 1999.
