= Fifty Fathoms Deep (1932 film) =

1932 film

- Directed by: Jack Forrester
- Written by: Dorothy Howell; Jean-Charles Reynaud
- Starring: Jeanne Helbling; Thomy Bourdelle; Frank O'Neill
- Cinematography: André Dantan; Enzo Riccioni; Joseph Walker
- Production company: Forrester-Parant Productions
- Distributed by: Forrester-Parant Productions
- Release date: 24 June 1932
- Running time: 66 minutes
- Country: France
- Language: French

Fifty Fathoms Deep (French title: Mon ami Tim) is a 1932 French drama film directed by Jack Forrester and starring Jeanne Helbling, Thomy Bourdelle and Frank O'Neill.

== Cast ==
- Jeanne Helbling as Myra Maden
- Thomy Bourdelle as Tim Burke
- Frank O'Neill as Pinky Lawrence
- Grazia del Rio as Une amie
- Raymond Dandy as Un passant
- Dahlia
- Jean Gaubens
- Clara Lee
- Raymond Narlay

== Bibliography ==
- Crisp, Colin. Genre, Myth and Convention in the French Cinema, 1929-1939. Indiana University Press, 2002.
