= Hugo Paul Thieme =

American academic

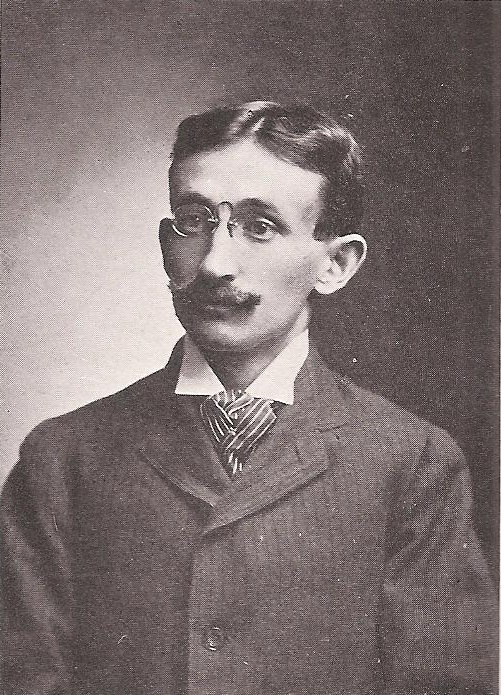
Hugo Paul Thieme

Hugo Paul Thieme (born Fort Wayne, Indiana, February 2, 1870; died Ann Arbor, Michigan, June 2, 1940) was an American literary critic, bibliographer, and university professor.

== Works ==
- La littérature française du dix-neuvième siècle. Bibliographie des principaux prosateurs, poètes, auteurs dramatiques et critiques, Paris 1897 (90 pages)
- Guide bibliographique de la littérature française de 1800 à 1906. Prosateurs, poètes, auteurs dramatiques et critiques, Paris 1907, Grenoble 2010 (510 pages)
- Women of modern France, Philadelphia 1907, Project Gutenberg 2005 (Woman in all ages and in all countries)
- (with John Robert Effinger) A French grammar, New York 1908, 1912
- Essai sur l'histoire du vers français, Paris 1916, New York 1971
- La civilisation française jugée par un Américain, Paris 1924
- Essais sur la civilisation française, Paris 1933
- Bibliographie de la littérature française de 1800 à 1930, 3 volumes, Paris 1933, 2 volumes, Geneva 1971, 1983 (1. A-K, 2. L-Z, 3. La civilisation [Ouvrages et articles à consulter sur l’histoire de la langue, de la littérature et de la civilisation française]; XXVII-1061, XXV-1041, 216 pages)
