= L'Atlantide (1921 film) =

1921 film by Jacques Feyder

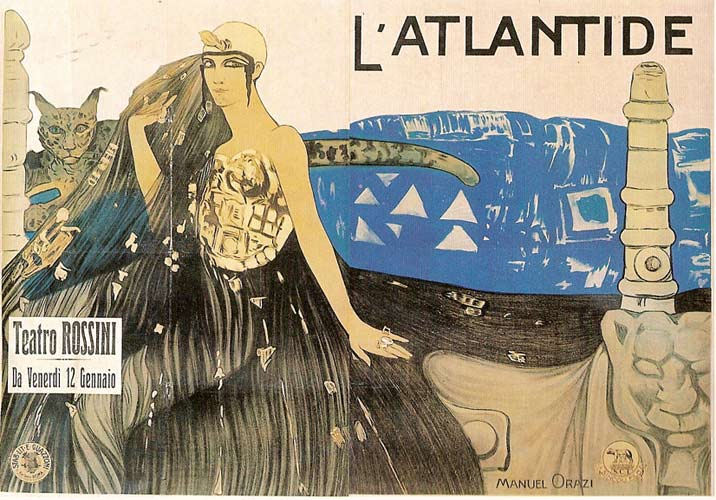
- Poster by Manuel Orazi
- Directed by: Jacques Feyder
- Screenplay by: Jacques Feyder
- Based on: L'Atlantide by Pierre Benoit
- Starring: Jean Angelo; Georges Melchior; Stacia Napierkowska
- Cinematography: Georges Specht; Victor Morin; Amédée Morrin
- Music by: M. Jemain (original score)
- Production companies: Thalman & Cie
- Distributed by: Louis Aubert
- Release date: 4 June 1921
- Running time: original length reported as 4000 metres (212 minutes); DVD of restored copy from Nederlands Filmmuseum 163 minutes (3708 metres)
- Countries: France; Belgium
- Languages: Silent film French intertitles

L'Atlantide is a 1921 French-Belgian silent film directed by Jacques Feyder, and the first of several adaptations of the best-selling novel L'Atlantide by Pierre Benoit. It was also released under various English titles at different times.

L'Atlantide (1921)

== Plot ==
In 1911, two French officers, Capitaine Morhange and Lieutenant Saint-Avit, become lost in the Sahara desert and discover the legendary kingdom of Atlantis, ruled by its ageless queen Antinéa. They become the latest in a line of captives whom she has taken as lovers, and who are killed and embalmed in gold after she has tired of them. Morhange however, already grieving for a lost love and planning to take holy orders, is indifferent to Antinéa's advances and rejects her. Angered and humiliated, she exploits the jealousy of his friend Saint-Avit and incites him to kill Morhange. Appalled by what he has done, Saint-Avit is helped to escape by Antinéa's secretary Tanit-Zerga, and after nearly dying in the desert from thirst and exhaustion, he is found by a patrol of soldiers. Saint-Avit returns to Paris and tries to resume his life, but he is unable to forget Antinéa. Three years later he returns to the desert and sets out to find her kingdom again, accompanied by another officer to whom he has told his story.

Much of the narrative is contained within a long flashback as Saint-Avit recounts his first visit to Antinéa; other shorter flashbacks are used within this framework, creating a fairly complex narrative structure.

== Recurring theme ==
Throughout the film, one theme is constant. The Sahara desert is a place of mystery and taboo where a person cannot enter without paying some kind of price. It is the experience of the desert which turns men in the film into victors.

== Cast ==
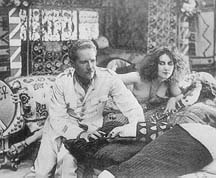
featuring Georges Melchior and Stacia Napierkowska

- Jean Angelo as Capt. Morhange
- Stacia Napierkowska as Queen Antinea
- Georges Melchior as Lt. de Saint-Avit
- Marie-Louise Iribe as Tanit-Zerga
- Abd-el-Kader Ben Ali as Cegheir ben Cheik
- Mohamed Ben Noui as Guide Bou-Djema
- Paul Franceschi as Archivist
- André Roanne as Segheïr ben Cheïkh
- René Lorsay as Lt. Olivier Ferrières

== Production and distribution ==
When Jacques Feyder obtained the rights to film Benoit's novel, he insisted that the film should be made on location in the Sahara, a strategy which no filmmaker had previously used for a project on this scale. The cast and crew consisted of 25 artists, an estimated 60 Tuareg with their dromedaries and a number of extras who were recruited on site. His whole cast and crew were first taken to Touggourt, Algeria for two months, followed by the Aurès Mountains and then Djidjelli on the coast, for a total of 8 months of filming. Even the interiors were filmed in an improvised studio in a tent outside Algiers, with sets by the painter Manuel Orazi.

Feyder initially borrowed production money from his cousin who was a director of Banque Thalmann. By the time of the film's release in October 1921, the costs had escalated to an unprecedented figure of nearly 2 million francs, and its financial backers rapidly sold their rights to the distributor Louis Aubert. The film soon became a huge success however; it ran at a Paris cinema for over one year and was widely sold abroad. Aubert re-released the film in 1928 and it had a renewed success.

Following the success of the film, Feyder would become a major influence in the development of French commercial cinema.

== Reception ==
The celebrity of the source novel as well as the much-reported circumstances of the production ensured that the film received plenty of attention on its release. Despite the 3-hour running time, it proved popular with the public and put Jacques Feyder into the front rank of French filmmakers. The critical reception of the film was more mixed, with particular objections made against the central performance by Stacia Napierkowska; she had been a dancer and well-known film actress for many years, but Feyder now regretted engaging her to portray Antinéa, especially when he found that she had gained an inappropriate amount of weight. Louis Delluc said: "There is one great actor in this film, that is the sand".

L'Atlantide was one of the earliest feature films to depict the French colonial presence in North Africa, and led the way for a series of other films made during the 1920s which emphasised the romantic and exotic aspects of the colonial experience; later examples in this colonial tradition included Le Bled (1929), Le Grand Jeu (1934), and La Bandera (1935).

L'Atlantide served as a remedy to France's postwar identity. Critic Jean Mitry called it the "first really successful postwar French film". The film first premiered in Paris, France at the Gaumont-Palace on the 4th of June, 1921. It would then go on to play at the Madeleine cinema in Marseilles, France, starting on September 30th, 1921. The 850-seat theater ran the film for a year, setting a record for the length of time a film was available to be seen. It was not until the release of Ben-Hur by Fred Niblo, the 1925 film, that this record would be broken.

== Cultural influence ==
L'Atlantide was filmed three years after the end of World War I and is considered the first major motion picture of the colonial cinema genre. Following the Great War and the death of an estimated 1.4 million French people, Feyder intended to make a film to uplift the French public. The success of the film can also be attributed to the way in which the film allowed the public to escape their current reality of a postwar era while simultaneously criticizing the effects the war had on French society.

The film also explores the relationships between the French and the African, and between the Berbers and Arabs with a mix of fact and fiction.

== Preservation status ==
A DVD version of the film was released by Lobster Films/MK2 in 2004, based on a restored copy at the Nederlands Filmmuseum in Amsterdam. This reveals the very high quality of the film's photography, and it includes a detailed scheme of colour tinting throughout the print. Its running time is 30+ minutes (300 metres) shorter than the reported length of the original. It has a new musical soundtrack by Eric Le Guen.

== Alternative titles ==
- Lost Atlantis (USA)
- Missing Husbands (USA)
- Queen of Atlantis (USA)
- Die Loreley der Sahara (Germany)
- 女郎蜘蛛 (Japanese)
- A Woman of Atlantis
