= Jacques Séverac =

French film director

- Born: 1902
- Died: 1982 (aged 79–80)
- Occupations: Film director Screenwriter
- Years active: 1928-1962

Jacques Séverac (1902–1982) was a French film director and screenwriter. He directed 21 films between 1928 and 1962. His film Children of the Sun was entered into the 1962 Cannes Film Festival.

== Selected filmography ==
- Colomba (1933)
- The Imberger Mystery (1935)
- The Forsaken (1937)
- Goodbye Vienna (1939)
- White Patrol (1942)
- White Wings (1943)
- The Renegade (1948)
- Children of the Sun (1962)
