= List of French films of 1925 =

French films released in 1925

A list of films produced in France in 1925:

| Title | Director | Cast | Genre | Notes |
|---|---|---|---|---|
| 600.000 francs par mois | Robert Péguy, Nicolas Koline | | | |
| The Abbot Constantine | Julien Duvivier | Jean Coquelin, Claude France | Comedy | |
| The Adventures of Robert Macaire | Jean Epstein | Jean Angelo, Suzanne Bianchetti, Maximilienne | Comedy adventure | |
| Amour et carburateur | Pière Colombier | | | |
| Amours Exotiques | Léon Poirier | Rama-Tahe, Suzanne Bianchetti | | |
| Autour d'un berceau | Georges Monca, Maurice Kéroul | Pierre Batcheff, Genevieve Felix | Drama | |
| Barocco | Charles Burguet | | | |
| Chou-Chou poids-plume | Gaston Ravel | | | |
| Comment j'ai tué mon enfant | Alexandre Ryder | Jacqueline Forzane, Georges Lannes | | |
| Count Kostia | Jacques Robert | Conrad Veidt, Genica Athanasiou | Historical | |
| A Daughter of Israel | Edward José | Betty Blythe, Léon Mathot | Drama | |
| Destinée | Henry Roussell | | | |
| Face à la mort | Gérard Bourgeois | Harry Piel, Dary Holm | Thriller | Co-production with Germany |
| Fanfan la Tulipe | René Leprince | Aimé Simon-Girard | Adventure | |
| Feu Mathias Pascal | Marcel L'Herbier | Ivan Mozzhukhin, Michel Simon | Drama | |
| Gribiche | Jacques Feyder | Jean Forest, Françoise Rosay | Drama | |
| Jack | Robert Saidreau | | | |
| Jocaste | Gaston Ravel | Thomy Bourdelle, Sandra Milovanoff | Drama | |
| Knock | René Hervil | Fernand Fabre, Léon Malavier, René Lefèvre | Comedy | |
| L'heureuse mort | Serge Nadejdine | Suzanne Bianchetti, Nicolas Rimsky | Drama | |
| L' orphelin du cirque | Georges Lannes | | | |
| La blessure | Marco de Gastyne | Léon Mathot, Henri Étiévant | Silent | |
| La Brière | Léon Poirier | | Drama | |
| La chaussée des géants | Robert Boudrioz, Jean Durand | Armand Tallier, Philippe Hériat | | |
| La clé de voute | Roger Lion | Max Maxudian | Drama | |
| La closerie des Genets | André Liabel | Henry Krauss, Jean Dax | Silent | |
| La course du flambeau | Luitz Morat | | | |
| La douleur | Gaston Roudès | Constant Rémy, France Dhélia | Silent | |
| La femme aux yeux fermés | Alexandre Ryder | Maryse Maia, Pierre Stephen | | |
| La flamme | René Hervil | Charles Vanel, Germaine Rouer | Drama | |
| La Justicière | Maurice de Marsan, Maurice Gleize | | | |
| La maternelle | Gaston Roudès | | | |
| The Night Watch | Marcel Silver | Suzanne Bianchetti, Vladimir Gajdarov, Raquel Meller | Drama | |
| La nuit de la revanche | Henri Etiévant | Léon Mathot, Charles Vanel | | |
| La princesse aux clowns | André Hugon | Huguette Duflos, Charles de Rochefort | Silent | |
| La terre promise | Henry Roussel | Pierre Blanchar, Raquel Meller, André Roanne | Silent | |
| Le berceau des dieux | Fred LeRoy Granville | | | |
| Le Bossu | Jean Kemm | Gaston Jacquet, Claude France, Marcel Vibert | Adventure | |
| Le château de la mort lente | E.B. Donatien | | | |
| Le cœur des gueux | Alfred Machin, Henry Wulschleger | | | |
| Le Double Amour | Jean Epstein | Nathalie Lissenko, Jean Angelo | Drama | |
| Le Reveil | Jacques de Baroncelli | Charles Vanel, Max Maxudian | | |
| Le roi de la pédale | Maurice Champreux | Georges Biscot, Blanche Montel | Comedy | |
| Le voyage imaginaire | René Clair | Dolly Davis, Albert Préjean | Comedy | |
| Les aventures de Robert Macaire | Jean Epstein | Jean Angelo, Alex Allin | Adventure | |
| Les élus de la mer | Gaston Roudès, Marcel Dumont | | | |
| Les Misérables | Henri Fescourt | Gabriel Gabrio, Sandra Milovanoff | Drama | |
| Les murailles du silence | Louis De Carbonnat | | | |
| Les petits | Gaston Roudès, Marcel Dumont | | | |
| Madame Sans-Gêne | Léonce Perret | Gloria Swanson, Émile Drain | Romantic comedy | |
| Montmartre | Charles Burguet | Gaby Morlay, Maurice Schutz | Drama | |
| Monte Carlo | Louis Mercanton | Carlyle Blackwell, Betty Balfour | Drama | |
| Mylord l'Arsouille | René Leprince | | | |
| My Priest Among the Rich | Émile-Bernard Donatien | Lucienne Legrand, Louis Kerly, Georges Melchior | Comedy | |
| Nantas | Donatien | Jeanne Bérangère | Drama | |
| Naples au baiser de feu | Serge Nadejdine, Jacques Robert | Gaston Modot, Gina Manès | Drama | |
| Oiseaux de passage | Gaston Roudès | | | |
| The Painter and His Model | Jean Manoussi | Léon Mathot, Ginette Maddie | Silent | Co-production with Germany |
| Paris Qui Dort | René Clair | Henri Rollan | Sci-fi (short) | |
| The Phantom of the Moulin Rouge | René Clair | Albert Préjean, Sandra Milovanoff | Fantasy | |
| Prince Charming | Viktor Tourjansky | Jaque Catelain, Nathalie Kovanko, Nicolas Koline | Adventure | |
| Princess Lulu | René Leprince | Pierre Batcheff, Lucienne Legrand Camille Bert | Drama | |
| The Promised Land | Henry Roussel | Pierre Blanchar, Raquel Meller | Silent | |
| The Red Head | Julien Duvivier | Henry Krauss, Charlotte Barbier-Krauss | Drama | |
| Salammbô | Pierre Marodon | Rolla Norman, Victor Vina | Drama | |
| Sans famille | Maurice Kéroul, Georges Monca | Leslie Shaw, Denise Lorys | Drama | |
| Un fils d'Amérique | Henri Fescourt | | Comedy | |
| Surcouf | Luitz-Morat | Jean Angelo, Thomy Bourdelle | Adventure | |
| Swifter Than Death | Harry Piel, Gérard Bourgeois | Harry Piel, Dary Holm, Denise Legeay | Action | Co-production with Germany |
| Veille d'Armes | Jacques de Baroncelli | Maurice Schutz, Jean Bradin | | |
| Visages d'enfants | Jacques Feyder | Jean Forest, Victor Vina | Drama | |
| The Vocation of André Carel | Jean Choux | Blanche Montel, Michel Simon, Camille Bert | Comedy drama | Co-production with Switzerland |
| The Whirlpool of Fate | Jean Renoir | Catherine Hessling, Pierre Renoir | Romantic drama | IMDb |
| Zigano | Gérard Bourgeois | Harry Piel, Denise Legeay, Dary Holm | Adventure | Co-production with Germany |

== See also ==
- 1925 in France
