= List of French films of 1924 =

French films released in 1924

A list of films produced in France in 1924:

Title	Director	Cast	Genre	Notes
After Love	Maurice Champreux	André Nox, Jeanne Provost, Blanche Montel	Drama	
Altemer le Cynique	Georges Monca et Maurice Kéroul			
Au Secours!	Abel Gance	Max Linder, Jean Toulout	Comedy	
Backbiters	Albert Dieudonné, Jean Renoir	Catherine Hessling, Albert Dieudonné		
Ballet Mécanique	Fernand Léger	Alice Prin		
Bibi la Purée	Maurice Champreux			
The Clairvoyant	Leon Abrams	Sarah Bernhardt, Georges Melchior	Drama	
Claudine et le poussin ou Le temps d'aimer	Marcel Manchez			
Coeurs farouches	Julien Duvivier	Desdemona Mazza, Gaston Jacquet	Drama	
Credo ou la tragedie de Lourdes	Julien Duvivier	Georges Deneubourg, Gaston Jacquet	Drama	
Enfants de Paris	Albert Francis Bertoni			
Entr'acte	René Clair	Jean Börlin, Inge Frïss		
Face à la mort	Gérard Bourgeois	Harry Piel, Denise Legeay	Serial	
Feliana l'espionne	Gaston Roudès			
Grand'Mère d' Alberto				
Heart of an Actress	Germaine Dulac	Iván Petrovich, Mabel Poulton	Drama	
I Have Killed	Roger Lion	Sessue Hayakawa, Huguette Duflos, Max Maxudian	Crime	
Imperial Violets	Henry Roussel	Raquel Meller, Suzanne Bianchetti	Historical	
L'affiche	Jean Epstein	Nathalie Lissenko, Genica Missirio		
L'arriviste	André Hugon	Pierre Blanchar, Jeanne Helbling		
L'enfant des Halles	René Leprince	Camille Bert, Suzanne Bianchetti	Drama	
L'épervier	Robert Boudrioz			
L'éveil	Gaston Roudès, Marcel Dumont			
L'héritage de cent millions de Armand	Armand Du Plessy			
L'homme sans nerfs	Gérard Bourgeois and Harry Piel			
L'Inhumaine	Marcel L'Herbier	Georgette Leblanc, Jaque Catelain		
L'ironie du sort	Georges Monca, Maurice Kéroul			
L'oeuvre immortelle	Julien Duvivier	Suzanne Christy, Maurice Widy	Drama	
L'ombre du bonheur	Gaston Roudès			
L'ornière	Édouard Chimot			
La brière	Léon Poirier			
La Cité foudroyée	Luitz-Morat			
La closerie des Genêts	André Liabel			
La double existence de Lord Samsey	Georges Monca and Maurice Kéroul			
La Flambée des Reves	Jacques de Baroncelli	Sandra Milowanoff, Charles Vanel		
La galerie des monstres	Jaque Catelain			
La Gitanilla	André Hugon	Ginette Maddie, Robert Guibert		
La goutte de sang	Maurice Mariaud, Jean Epstein	Andree Lionel, Roger Karl	Drama	
La joueuse d'orgue	Charles Burguet	M. Girardin, E. Buffet	Drama	
La main qui a tué	Maurice de Marsan, Maurice Gleize			
La Princesse aux clowns	André Hugon	Huguette Duflos, Charles de Rochefort		
La Vocation d'André Carel	Jean Choux			
Le chiffonnier de Paris	Serge Nadejdine			
Le diable dans la ville	Germaine Dulac			
Le Lion des Mogols	Jean Epstein	Ivan Mosjoukine, Camille Bardou	Drama	
Le Miracle des Loups	Raymond Bernard	Romuald Joubé, Yvonne Sergyl	Historical	
Le Vert Galant	René Leprince			
Les cinquante ans de Don Juan	Henri Etiévant			
Les fils du soleil	René Le Somptier	Georges Charlia, Marquisette Bosky	Serial	
Les grands	Henri Fescourt			
Les Héritiers de l'oncle	Alfred Machin, Henry Wulschleger	M. Schey, Georges Terof	Comedy drama	
The Loves of Rocambole	Charles Maudru	Claude Mérelle, Max Maxudian	Silent	
Lucette				
Mandrin	Henri Fescourt	Romuald Joubé, Hugues de Bagratide, Jeanne Helbling	Adventure	
The Masked Woman	Viktor Tourjansky	Nathalie Kovanko, Jeanne Brindeau, Nicolas Koline	Crime drama	
Mimi Pinson	Théo Bergerat	Gabriel de Gravone, Simone Vaudry	Drama	
My Uncle Benjamin	René Leprince	Léon Mathot, Charles Lamy	Comedy	
Paris	René Hervil	Pierre Magnier, Dolly Davis, Henry Krauss	Drama	
Paul et Virginie	Robert Péguy			
Pecheur d'Islande	Jacques de Baroncelli			
Pierre et Jean	Émile-Bernard Donatien	Suzanne Desprès, Georges Charlia	Drama	
The Princess and the Clown	André Hugon	Huguette Duflos, Charles de Rochefort	Silent	
Quelqu’un dans l'ombre	Marcel Manchez			
Rêves de clowns	René Hervoin			
Terror	Edward José, Gérard Bourgeois	Pearl White, Henri Baudin, Arlette Marchal	Drama	
That Scoundrel Morin	Viktor Tourjansky	Nicolas Rimsky, Denise Legeay, René Donnio	Comedy	
Une vie sans joie	Albert Dieudonné	Catherine Hessling, Albert Dieudonné		
Violettes impériales	Henry Roussell	Raquel Meller, Suzanne Bianchetti	Historical	
Voulez-vous faire du Cinéma ?	Pierre Ramelot, René Alinat			

== See also ==
- 1924 in France
