= List of French films of 1926 =

French films released in 1926

A list of films produced in France in 1926:

Title	Director	Cast	Genre	Notes
Au revoir… et merci	E.B. Donatien, Pière Colombier			
Carmen	Jacques Feyder	Raquel Meller		
Emak-Bakia	Man Ray	Alice Prin, Jacques Rigaut		
Feu	Jacques de Baroncelli			
Feu Mathias Pascal	Marcel L'Herbier	Ivan Mozzhukhin	Comedy drama	
Florine, la fleur du Valois	E.B. Donatien			
A Gentleman of the Ring	Gaston Ravel	André Roanne, André Lefaur	Sports	
The Good Reputation	Pierre Marodon	Lotte Neumann, Hans Mierendorff	Drama	Co-production with Germany
Graziella	Marcel Vandal	Suzanne Dehelly, Antonin Artaud	Drama	
The Imaginary Voyage (Le Voyage imaginaire)	René Clair	Dolly Davis, Albert Préjean	Comedy	
Jean Chouan	Luitz-Morat	René Navarre, Claude Mérelle	Historical	
Jim la Houlette, roi des voleurs	Nicolas Rimsky, Roger Lion	Nicholas Rimsky, Gaby Morlay		
Karina the Dancer	Pierre Chenal	Louis Jouvet, Marcel Dalio	Comedy drama	
The Lady of Lebanon	Marco de Gastyne	Arlette Marchal, Iván Petrovich	Drama	
L'agonie de Jérusalem	Julien Duvivier	Edmond Van Daële, Maurice Schutz		
L'île enchantée	Henry Roussell			
L'inconnue des six jours	René Sti	Tania Fédor, Michel Simon	Fantasy	
La Fin de Monte-Carlo	Mario Nalpas, Henri Etiévant	Francesca Bertini, Jean Angelo		
La folie des vaillants	Germaine Dulac	Raphael Liévin, Lia Loo	Drama	
La forêt qui tue	René Le Somptier			
La grande amie	Max De Rieux			
La leçon bien apprise	Gauthier Debère			
La lueur dans les ténèbres	Maurice Charmeroy	Ginette Maddie, Christiane Rhodes		
La petite fonctionnaire	Roger Goupillières			
La Rose effeuillée	Georges Pallu			
La terre qui meurt	Jean Choux			
La tournée Farigoule	Marcel Manchez			
Le berceau de dieu	Fred LeRoy Granville	Léon Mathot	Drama	
Le bouif errant	René Hervil		Adventure	
Le capitaine Rascasse	Henri Desfontaines	Gabriel Gabrio, Jeanne Helbling		
Le chemin de la gloire	Gaston Roudès	Constant Rémy, France Dhélia	Comedy drama	
Le criminel	Alexandre Ryder	Andre Nox, Jean Lorette		
Le dédale	Gaston Roudès, Marcel Dumont	Claude France, Georges Melchior	Drama	
Le Diable au coeur	Marcel L'Herbier	Betty Balfour, Roger Karl	Comedy drama	
Le joueur d'échecs	Raymond Bernard	Françoise Rosay, Conrad Veidt	Historical	
Le p'tit Parigot	René Le Somptier	Marcel Achard, George Biscot	Serial	
Le prince Zilah	Gaston Roudès	France Dhélia, Jean Devalde	Drama	
Le secret d'une mère	Georges Pallu		Comedy drama	
Les larmes de Colette	René Barberis	Andre Rolane, Renée Carl		
Mademoiselle Josette, My Woman	Gaston Ravel	Dolly Davis, Livio Pavanelli	Silent	
The Man with the Hispano	Julien Duvivier	Georges Galli, Huguette Duflos	Drama	
Les mensonges	Pierre Marodon	Lotte Neumann, Hans Mierendorff		Co-production with Germany
Marquitta	Jean Renoir	Marie-Louise Uribe, Jean Angelo		
The Marriage of Rosine	Pierre Colombier	André Lefaur, Josyane	Silent	
Martyre	Charles Burguet		Drama	
Mauprat	Jean Epstein	Sandra Milovanoff, Maurice Schutz	Drama	
Ménilmontant	Dimitri Kirsanoff	Nadia Sibirskaïa, Guy Belmont		
Michel Strogoff	Viktor Tourjansky	Ivan Mozzhukhin, Nathalie Kovanko	Historical	
Mots croisés	Pière Colombier	Marta d'Hervilly, Hubert Daix		
My Priest Among the Poor	Émile-Bernard Donatien	Lucienne Legrand, Louis Kerly, Jules de Spoly	Comedy	
Muche	Robert Péguy			
Nana	Jean Renoir	Catherine Hessling, Werner Krauss	Drama	
Nitchevo	Jacques de Baroncelli	Charles Vanel, Lillian Hall-Davis		
Paris in Five Days	Pierre Colombier, Nicolas Rimsky	Nicolas Rimsky, Dolly Davis, Madeleine Guitty	Comedy	
Phi-Phi	Georges Pallu	André Deed, George Gauthier		
En plongée	Jacques Robert	Lilian Constantini, Daniel Mendaille	Silent	
Pour régner	André Luguet			
Rien que les heures	Alberto Cavalcanti		Documentary	
Rue de la Paix	Henri Diamant-Berger	Suzy Pierson, Léon Mathot		
Simone	Émile-Bernard Donatien	Lucienne Legrand, Josseline Gaël	Drama	
Titi premier roi des gosses	René Leprince	Jeanne de Balzac, Simone Vaudry		
Va promener le chien	Gauthier Debère		Comedy	
Visage d' aïeule	Gaston Roudès			
Vittel				

== See also ==
- 1926 in France
