= List of French films of 1928 =

French films released in 1928

A list of films produced in France in 1928:

Title	Director	Cast	Genre	Notes
Antoinette Sabrier	Germaine Dulac	Ève Francis, Gabriel Gabrio, Jean Toulout	Drama	
Celles qui s'en font	Germaine Dulac	Lilian Constantini, George Vallee		
Change of Heart	Marco de Gastyne	Annette Benson, Olaf Fjord, Juliette Compton	Drama	
Cousin Bette	Max de Rieux	Germaine Rouer, Alice Tissot, Henri Baudin	Drama	
The Crew	Maurice Tourneur	Jean Dax, Claire de Lorez, Camille Bert	Drama	
Danses espagnoles	Germaine Dulac	Carmencita Garcia	Documentary	
Disque 957				
The Fall of the House of Usher	Jean Epstein	Jean Debucourt, Charles Lamy	Horror	
The Farewell Waltz	Henry Roussel	Pierre Blanchar, Marie Bell, Georges Deneubourg	Historical	
The Great Passion	André Hugon	Lil Dagover, Rolla Norman	Drama	
The Italian Straw Hat	René Clair	Albert Préjean, Olga Chekhova	Comedy	
The Kiss That Kills	Jean Choux	Thérèse Reignier, Georges Oltramare	Drama	
L'Argent	Marcel L'Herbier	Pierre Alcover, Brigitte Helm	Drama	
L'Étoile de mer	Man Ray	Kiki, André de la Rivière		
La Chute de la maison Usher	Jean Epstein	Marguerite Gance, Jean Debucourt	Mystery	
In Old Stamboul	Roger Goupillières	Hugues de Bagratide, Acho Chakatouny, Lucien Dalsace	Adventure	
In the Shadow of the Harem	André Liabel, Léon Mathot	Léon Mathot, Louise Lagrange, Jackie Monnier	Drama	
Karina the Dancer	Henri Fescourt	André Nicolle, Bonaventura Ibáñez	Silent	
La Coquille et le clergyman	Germaine Dulac	Alex Allin, Lucien Battaille		
La Germination d'un haricot	Germaine Dulac		Documentary	
La petite marchande d'allumettes	Jean Renoir	Catherine Hessling, Eric Barclay	Drama	
La Tour	René Clair		Documentary	
Le Diable au coeur	Marcel L'Herbier	Betty Balfour, Jacque-Catelain		
Le Tourbillon de Paris	Julien Duvivier	Lil Dagover, Gaston Jacquet	Drama	
Little Devil May Care	Marcel L'Herbier	Betty Balfour, Roger Karl	Drama	
Madame Récamier	Tony Lekain, Gaston Ravel	Marie Bell, Françoise Rosay	Historical	
Mademoiselle's Chauffeur	Henri Chomette	Dolly Davis, Jim Gérald, Alice Tissot	Comedy	
Madonna of the Sleeping Cars	Marco de Gastyne, Maurice Gleize	Claude France, Olaf Fjord	Drama	
The Maelstrom of Paris	Julien Duvivier	Lil Dagover, Léon Bary	Silent	
Maldone	Jean Grémillon	Charles Dullin, Marcelle Dullin	Drama	
The Martyrdom of Saint Maxence	Émile-Bernard Donatien	Lucienne Legrand, Thomy Bourdelle	Drama	
Miss Helyett	Maurice Kéroul, Georges Monca	Marie Glory, Fernand Fabre, Jean Delannoy	Comedy	
Morgane, the Enchantress	Léonce Perret	Claire de Lorez, Iván Petrovich, Pierre Renoir	Drama	
The Mystery of the Eiffel Tower	Julien Duvivier	Tramel, Gaston Jacquet, Jimmy Gaillard	Thriller	
Nile Water	Marcel Vandal	Jean Murat, Max Maxudian, Lee Parry	Drama	
Not So Stupid	André Berthomieu	René Lefèvre, Madeleine Carroll	Comedy	
Paris-New York-Paris	Robert Péguy	Marcel Vibert, Colette Darfeuil	Comedy adventure	
The Passenger	Jacques de Baroncelli	Jean Mercanton, Charles Vanel	Silent	
The Passion of Joan of Arc	Carl Theodor Dreyer	Renée Jeanne Falconetti	Historical drama	
Prince Jean	René Hervil	Renée Héribel, Lucien Dalsace	Drama	
Princess Mandane	Germaine Dulac	Edmonde Guy, Edmond van Duren, Mona Goya	Adventure	
The Story of a Little Parisian	Augusto Genina	Carmen Boni, André Roanne	Drama	Co-production with Germany
Thèmes et variations	Germaine Dulac		Documentary	
Thérèse Raquin	Jacques Feyder	Gina Manès, Wolfgang Zilzer	Drama	
Tire au flanc	Jean Renoir	Fridette Fatton, Michel Simon	Comedy	
Two Timid Souls	René Clair	Pierre Batcheff, Jim Gerald	Comedy	
The Vein	René Barberis	Sandra Milovanoff, Rolla Norman	Comedy	
Yvette	Alberto Cavalcanti	Thomy Bourdelle, Pauline Carton, Catherine Hessling	Drama	

== See also ==
- 1928 in France
