= Walter Percy Day =

British painter (1878–1965)

Walter Percy Day O.B.E. (1878–1965) was a British painter best remembered for his work as a matte artist and special effects technician in the film industry. Professional names include W. Percy Day; Percy Day; "Pop" or "Poppa" Day, owing to his collaboration with sons Arthur George Day (1909–1952) draughtsman, Thomas Sydney Day (1912–1985), stills photographer and cameraman, and stepson, Peter Ellenshaw, who also worked in this field.

== Early life ==
Walter Percy Day was born in Luton (Bedfordshire) to Eli Day and Lucy Day, née Crawley, the second of three children. From 1908 to 1912, he resided in Tunisia, at Sidi Bou Saïd and Tunis, where he pursued a career as a painter of portraits and Orientalist scenes. The dramatic consequences of the Jellaz Affair uprising obliged the family to return to Britain early in 1912.

== The silent film era ==
In 1919, at Ideal Films Studios in Borehamwood, near Elstree Day mastered the art of illusionist techniques. Special effects such as those produced by Day enabled directors to enlarge their repertoire and to tackle subjects which might otherwise have been too costly to produce. In 1922, he relocated to France to its more vibrant cinema. There he introduced the use of the glass shot into French cinema. Used for the first time in Henry Roussel's Les Opprimés, released in 1923, the process was hailed by a critic as a revolution in cinematography. Among the directors with whom Day collaborated during the twenties were Jean Renoir, Raymond Bernard, Julien Duvivier, and Abel Gance. In addition to creating visual effects for Napoléon (1927), Day was cast as the British Admiral Hood in the film. From 1928, Day's studio became a team, when sons Arthur George Day (1909–1952) and Thomas Sydney Day (1912–1985) began to work for their father, the former as draughtsman and the latter as cameraman and stills photographer, starting with Léon Poirier's Verdun: Visions of History (1928).

In the late 1920s, he learned a new technique while working at British International Pictures' Elstree studios on Alfred Hitchcock's The Ring, that used mirrors and angling to superimpose a miniature over a scene. The inventor, Eugen Schüfftan, taught him the process directly.

When shooting the façade of the department store in Julien Duvivier's film Au Bonheur des Dames (1929) proved to be an insurmountable difficulty, Day utilised the stationary matte, a process similar to that patented by Norman Dawn on 11 June 1918.

== In the British film industry ==
A meeting with Alexander Korda opened up new perspectives for the Day studio. Day worked with Korda on The Private Life of Henry VIII (1933) a film starring Charles Laughton. Day accordingly established a studio in Iver (Buckinghamshire) and from 1936, directed the matte department at Denham Studios. The artist painted mattes and created trick shots for numerous films by Korda and his stable of directors, who included his brother Zoltan Korda, Anthony Asquith, William Cameron Menzies (Things to Come, 1936), Michael Powell, and Lothar Mendes. In 1946 Day joined the Korda group as Director of Special Effects at Korda's new premises at Shepperton Studios where he remained until his retirement in 1954.

Poppa Day's team disbanded once World War II began as all three sons enlisted. Pop Day trained some promising young matte painters, including Wally Veevers, who took over the matte department at Shepperton Studios when Pop Day retired in 1952.

During the war, the film studios made a series of heroic war films, aimed at boosting the morale of the beleaguered British, including Powell and Pressburger's 49th Parallel (US: The Invaders, 1941), Noël Coward and David Lean's In Which We Serve (1942) and Leslie Howard's The First of the Few (US: Spitfire, also 1942). In addition to designing special effects for these films, Day created trick photography for many other British classics released during the forties, including The Life and Death of Colonel Blimp (1943), A Matter of Life and Death [US: Stairway to Heaven, 1946], Anna Karenina (1948), and The Third Man (1949). In Laurence Olivier's production of Henry V (1944), many of the Agincourt battle scenes were painted on glass by Day, who contrived to make the horses' heads move, the pennants flutter and whirring motion of a flight of arrows in the completed shots. The Powell and Pressburger production of I Know Where I'm Going! (1945) contains a sequence in which the hero and heroine's boat gets sucked into the Corryvreckan whirlpool. Black Narcissus (1947) was shot entirely on the Pinewood Studios back lot, but a matte of the Himalayan mountain range in the climactic scene painted by Day and his assistants.

In 1948, Day was awarded the O.B.E. for his services to British cinema. Cameraman Christopher Challis, rendered homage to Percy Day's achievements: "Being able to marry painted backgrounds on glass to real action foregrounds opened up a new world to film makers. ...To appreciate the magnitude of his achievement, one has to understand the complexity of the work. Hours of painstaking labour with many retakes to obtain perfection. Now it is all too easy with computers and electronics and few people remain who can understand just how complicated it was. [Day’s] name should certainly be numbered among the great film pioneers, alongside Gaumont, Lumière, etc". Michael Powell, for his part, hailed Percy Day as "the greatest trick-man and film wizard that I have ever known." Percy Day's legacy was ranked by the British daily The Independent in 2008 as on a par with the great French special effects pioneer Georges Méliès.

== Death ==
Day died in Los Angeles in 1965.

== W. Percy Day filmography ==
Date of shooting followed by date of release

- The Thruster (dir. André Hugon, 1922/1924)
- Les Opprimés (dir. Henry Roussel, 1922/1923)
- The Promised Land (dir. Henry Roussel, 1924/1925)
- The Princess and the Clown (dir. André Hugon, 1925)
- Destinée (dir. Henry Roussel, 1925)
- Le Bossu (dir. Jean Kemm, 1925)
- The Flame (dir. René Hervil, 1925)
- Salammbô (dir. Pierre Maradon, 1925)
- Nana (dir. Jean Renoir, 1925/1926), art direction: Claude Autant-Lara
- Napoléon (dir. Abel Gance, 1925/1927)
- Autour de Napoléon. Abel Gance et son Napoléon (1925/1927) (documentary)
- Michel Strogoff (dir. Victor Tourjansky, 1926)
- The Chess Player (dir. Raymond Bernard, 1926/1927)
- Belphégor (dir. Henri Desfontaines, 1926/1927)
- L'Homme à l'Hispano (dir. Julien Duvivier, 1926/1927)
- The Loves of Casanova (dir. Alexandre Volkoff, 1927)
- Croquette (dir. Louis Mercanton, 1927)
- Le Martyre de Sainte-Maxence (dir. E.B. Donatien, 1927)
- Le Mystère de la Tour Eiffel (dir. Julien Duvivier, 1927)
- Saint Joan the Maid (dir. Marco de Gastyne, 1927)
- The Ring (dir. Alfred Hitchcock, 1927)
- The Maelstrom of Paris (dir. Julien Duvivier, 1927/1928)
- Verdun: Visions of History (dir. Léon Poirier, 1928)
- The Divine Voyage (dir. Julien Duvivier, 1928)
- Vivre (dir. Robert Boudrioz, 1928)
- Maman Colibri (dir. Julien Duvivier, 1928/1929)
- La Vie miraculeuse de Thérèse Martin (dir. Julien Duvivier, 1929)
- Cagliostro (dir. Richard Oswald, 1929)
- Au Bonheur des Dames (dir. Julien Duvivier, 1929)
- The Three Masks (dir. André Hugon, 1929)
- Le Roi des aulnes (dir. Marie-Louise Iribe, 1930)
- End of the World (dir. Abel Gance, 1930/1931)
- Autour de la fin du monde (dir. Eugène Deslaw, 1930) (documentary)
- Wine Cellars (dir. Benito Perojo, 1930)
- La fée du logis (dir. Germaine Dulac, 1931) (publicity spot for Gaumont films)
- The Three Musketeers (dir. Henri Diamant-Berger, 1932)
- Le Crime du Bouif (dir. André Berthomieu, 1932)
- The Private Life of Henry VIII (dir. Alexander Korda, 1933)
- The Private Life of Don Juan (dir. Alexander Korda, 1934)
- The Scarlet Pimpernel (dir. Alexander Korda, 1934)
- Scrooge (dir. Henry Edwards, 1935)
- Moscow Nights (dir. Anthony Asquith, 1935)
- Elephant Boy (dir. Robert J. Flaherty and Zoltan Korda, 1935/1937)
- Sanders of the River (dir. Zoltan Korda, 1935)
- A Tale of Two Cities (dir. Jack Conway, 1935)
- The Ghost Goes West (dir. René Clair, 1935/1936)
- The Man Who Could Work Miracles (dir. Lothar Mendes, 1936)
- Things to Come (dir. William Cameron Menzies, 1936)
- Rembrandt (dir. Alexander Korda, 1936)
- Fire Over England (dir. William K. Howard, 1936/1937)
- Forget Me Not (dir. Zoltan Korda, 1936/1937)
- The Drum (dir. Zoltan Korda, 1936/1938)
- Action for Slander (dir. Victor Saville, 1937)
- South Riding (dir. Victor Saville, 1937)
- Dark Journey (dir. Victor Saville, 1937)
- I Claudius (dir. Josef von Sternberg, 1937, unfinished film)
- Paradise for Two (dir. Thornton Freeland, 1938)
- Storm in a Teacup (dir. Victor Saville and Ian Dalrymple, 1937)
- Victoria the Great (dir. Herbert Wilcox, 1937)
- Knight Without Armour (dir. Jacques Feyder, 1937)
- Return of the Scarlet Pimpernel (dir. Hanns Schwarz, 1937/1938)
- Sixty Glorious Years (dir. Herbert Wilcox, 1938)
- The Divorce of Lady X (dir. Tim Whelan, 1938)
- Prison Without Bars (dir. Brian Desmond Hurst, 1938)
- The Four Feathers (dir. Zoltan Korda, 1939)
- Wuthering Heights (dir. William Wyler, 1938/1939)
- The Spy in Black (dir. Michael Powell, 1939)
- Q Planes (dir. Tim Whelan, 1939)
- The Hunchback of Notre Dame (dir. William Dieterle, 1939)
- Jamaica Inn (dir. Alfred Hitchcock, 1939)
- The Mikado (dir. Victor Schertzinger, 1939)
- Over the Moon (dir. Thornton Freeland, 1939/1940)
- Major Barbara (dir. Gabriel Pascal, 1940)
- Conquest of the Air (prod. Alexander Korda, 1940, work scrapped before release)
- The Thief of Bagdad (dir. Michael Powell, Ludwig Berger and Tim Whelan, 1940)
- Lydia (dir. Julien Duvivier, 1941)
- 49th Parallel (dir. Michael Powell, 1941)
- That Hamilton Woman (dir. Alexander Korda, 1941)
- Secret Mission (dir. Harold French, 1942)
- The First of the Few (dir. Leslie Howard, 1942)
- In Which We Serve (dir. Noël Coward, 1942)
- Jungle Book (dir. Zoltan Korda, 1943)
- The Life and Death of Colonel Blimp (dir. Powell and Pressburger, 1943)
- The Demi-Paradise (dir. Anthony Asquith, 1943)
- This Happy Breed (dir. David Lean, 1944)
- A Canterbury Tale (dir. Powell and Pressburger, 1944)
- Henry V (dir. Laurence Olivier, 1944)
- Blithe Spirit (dir. David Lean, 1945)
- Brief Encounter (dir. David Lean, 1945)
- I Know Where I'm Going! (dir. Powell and Pressburger, 1945)
- Caesar and Cleopatra (dir. Gabriel Pascal, 1945)
- Perfect Strangers (dir. Alexander Korda, 1945)
- A Matter of Life and Death (dir. Powell and Pressburger, 1946)
- Panic (Panique) (dir. Julien Duvivier, 1946)
- Great Expectations (dir. David Lean, 1946)
- Men of Two Worlds (dir. Thorold Dickinson, 1946)
- Black Narcissus (dir. Powell and Pressburger, 1946/1947)
- A Man About the House (dir. Leslie Arliss, 1947)
- An Ideal Husband (dir. Alexander Korda, 1947)
- Mine Own Executioner (dir. Anthony Kimmins, 1947/1948)
- Anna Karenina (dir. Julien Duvivier, 1947)
- The Fallen Idol (dir. Carol Reed, 1948)
- The Winslow Boy (dir. Anthony Asquith, 1948)
- Oliver Twist (dir. David Lean, 1948)
- Bonnie Prince Charlie (dir. Anthony Kimmins, 1948)
- The Third Man (dir. Carol Reed, 1949)
- The Last Days of Dolwyn (dir. Emlyn Williams and Russell Lloyd, 1949)
- The Mudlark (dir. Jean Negulesco, 1950)
- The Elusive Pimpernel (dir. Powell and Pressburger, 1950)
- The Cure for Love (dir. Robert Donat, 1950)
- Pandora and the Flying Dutchman (dir. Albert Lewin, 1950/1951)
- The Black Rose (dir. Henry Hathaway, 1950)
- Gone to Earth (a.k.a. The Wild Heart, dir. Powell and Pressburger, 1950)
- Outcast of the Islands (dir. Carol Reed, 1951)

== Sources ==
=== Reference works ===
- British Film Yearbook, London, 1949–1950, p. 520
- Royal Academy Exhibitions 1905–1970. A Dictionary of Artists and their Work in the Summer Exhibitions of the Royal Academy of Arts. London: E. P. Publishing, 1977, vol. II, p. 138.
- Brian McFarlane. The Encyclopedia of British Film. London: Methuen, 2003, p. 166
- Maurice Bessy; Jean-Louis Chardans. Dictionnaire du cinéma et de la television. Paris : Pauvert, 1966, Tome 2 p. 21 [Attention, CONFUSION with Will Day]
- Susan Day. "Walter Percy Day". Allegemeines Künstlerlexikon. Munich; Leipzig: K.G. Saur Vg., 2000, vol. 24, pp. 581–582

=== Monographies ===
- Linda d’Agostino Clinger, The Garden Within. The Art of Peter Ellenshaw. Venice, Mill Pond Press, 1996
- British Film Institute presents... Napoléon vu par Abel Gance, Presentation programme, Festival Hall, London, 2000
- Kevin Brownlow, Napoléon, Abel Gance’s Classic Film. London 1983, p. 118–119
- Ivan Butler, Cinema in Britain. An Illustrated History. London, 1973, p. 75, 153.
- Jack Cardiff, Magic Hour. London: Faber & Faber, 1996
- The Chess Player, (The Joueur d’échecs) Thames Television and National Film Archive Presentation Programme, London, 1990
- Ian Christie, Arrows of Desire. The Films of Michael Powell and Emeric Pressburger, London, 1985
- Cotta Vaz, Mark; Barron, Craig (2002). The Invisible Art: The Legends of Movie Matte Painting. San Francisco California: Chronicle Books. p. 27. ISBN 978-0-8118-4515-1.
- John Culhane, Special Effects in the Movies. How they do it. New York: Ballantine Books, 1981, p. 45, 50–52, 155–156
- Maurice Culot. Le temps des boutiques. De l’échoppe à eBay. Brussels: A.A.M., s.d., p. 10–11
- Max Douy, Jacques Douy, Décors de Cinéma. Les Studios français de Mélès à nos jours. Paris, 1993, p. 45
- Charles Drazin, In Search of the Third Man. London: Methuen, 1999
- Peter Ellenshaw, Ellenshaw under Glass. Going to the Matte for Disney. Santa Clarita: Camphor Tree Publishers, 2003
- Karol Kulik, Alexander Korda. The Man Who Could Work Miracles. Lond, 1975 (reimpr 1990)
- Philip Leibfried; Malcolm Willits; Jim Danforth. Alexander Korda’s The Thief of Bagdad. An Arabian Fantasy. Pasadena : Castle Press, 2003
- Rachel Low. Film Making in 1930’s Britain. London: Allen & Unwin, 1985, p. 250
- Michael Powell, A Life in Movies: An Autobiography. London : Mandarin, 1986
- Michael Powell. Million-Dollar Movie. New York: Random House, 1995
- Christopher Finch, Special Effects. Creating Movie Magic. New York: Abbeville Press, 1984, p. 68
- Rolf Giesen, Special Effects. King Kong, Orphée und die Reise zum Mond. Ebersberg: Edition Achteinhalb, 1985, p. 159
- Alan McKenzie; Derek Ware. Hollywood Tricks of the Trade. London: Multimedia Publications, 1986, pp. 19–20

=== Articles ===
- J.-Nicolas Gung’L, « Chronique artistique. Percy Day, peintre de portraits », La Tunisie Illustrée, April 1910.
- « Picture with a Story. Mr. Percy Day Explains his Academic Painting". Daily Chronicle, 12 May 1919.
- Georges Baye, « A propos du film Les Opprimés. Révolution dans le décor cinématographique », Ciné Miroir, 15 March 1923
- « En marge du Joueur d’échecs », Cinémagazine, n° 2, 14 January 1927, special issue
- La Petite Illustration Cinématographique, n° 8, 5 February 1927, special issue
- "La prise de vues", Le courrier cinématographique, 29 mars 1929, p. 18–19
- Le Courrier cinématographique, March 1929 "Special Effects Teams Save Time and Money", Kinematograph Weekly, 2 October 1947 Kinematograph Weekly, 24 October 1946, p. 15
- Walter Percy Day."The Origin and Development of the Matte Shot". Fourth Newman Memorial Lecture", The Photographic Journal, October 1948.
- Egon Larsen, "Here is the Inside Story of the Magician of British Films", Cavalcade, 21 May 1949
- Douglas Hague, "Painted Matte Shots", British Kinematographic Society Magazine, vol. 19, n° 6, 1951, p. 166
- "Pop Day, 75, goes back to college". Kent Messenger, 30 April 1954
- "Trauner au naturel", Libération, 13 March 1984, p. 24
- Edouard Waintrop, "Blimp Blimp Hourrah", Libération, 2 April 1992, p. 42
- Gilbert Adair, "The Other Side of Harry Lime", Evening Standard, 23 August 1999, p. 42
- James Christopher, "Britain’s best bar nun?", The Times, 4 August 2005, p. T2
- Geoffrey MacNab, "He Made Monsters", The Independent, 20 June 2008.
