= Épave =

L'Épave (shipwreck) may refer to:

== Books ==
- Les Épaves (The Wrecks), six poems by Charles Baudelaire printed in Brussels, 1866
- L'Épave, story by Guy de Maupassant

== Film ==
- L'Épave, 1908 film by Gérard Bourgeois
- L'Épave (fr), 1909 film by Louis Feuillade
- L'Épave, 1917 film by Maurice Mariaud
- L'Épave, 1920 film by Lucien Lehmann
- L'Épave, 1949 film by Willy Rozier with Françoise Arnoul
- Épaves, 1943 documentary by Jacques Cousteau
