= Yasmina (film) =

1927 film

- Directed by: André Hugon
- Written by: André Hugon; Theodore Valensi (novel)
- Starring: Camille Bert; Huguette Duflos; Léon Mathot
- Cinematography: Willy Faktorovitch; Maurice Velle
- Production companies: Films André Hugon; L.C.J. Editions & Productions
- Distributed by: Etablissements Louis Aubert
- Release date: 11 February 1927
- Running time: 130 minutes
- Country: France
- Languages: Silent; French intertitles

Yasmina is a 1927 French silent film directed by André Hugon and starring Camille Bert, Huguette Duflos and Léon Mathot.

== Cast ==
- Camille Bert as Afsen
- Huguette Duflos as Yasmina
- Léon Mathot as Docteur Hector Grandier
- Thérèse Kolb as Athima, la nourrice
- Habib Benglia as Le gardien du sérail
- Alexiane
- Simone d'A-Lal
- Jaime Devesa as Kaïs, l'arabe
- Madeleine Martellet as Kamra

== Bibliography ==
- Goble, Alan. The Complete Index to Literary Sources in Film. Walter de Gruyter, 1999.
