= Jeannou =

1943 film

- Directed by: Léon Poirier
- Written by: Léon Poirier
- Starring: Michèle Alfa; Saturnin Fabre; Thomy Bourdelle
- Cinematography: Georges Million
- Edited by: Raymonde Nevers
- Music by: Adolphe Borchard
- Production company: Gaumont
- Distributed by: Gaumont
- Release date: 10 November 1943
- Running time: 101 minutes
- Country: France
- Language: French

Jeannou is a 1943 French comedy film directed by Léon Poirier and starring Michèle Alfa, Saturnin Fabre and Thomy Bourdelle.

The film's sets were designed by the art director Raymond Druart. It was partly shot on location in Mouzens in the Dordogne region.

The film was made during the German occupation of France and is notable for its Vichyist theme of returning to the land. Poirier had already displayed his Nationalist sympathies with his patriotic films Verdun and The Call of Silence.

== Cast ==
- Michèle Alfa as Jeannou
- Saturnin Fabre as Frochard
- Thomy Bourdelle as Peyrac
- Roger Duchesne as Pierre Levasseur
- Pierre Magnier as Le marquis de Cantagril
- Maurice Schutz as Éloi des Farges
- Henri Poupon
- Henri Arius
- Pierre Labry
- Maurice Salabert
- Lyne Carrel as Albertine
- Marcelle Géniat as Marceline
- Mireille Perrey as Conchita de Cantagril

== Bibliography ==
- Crisp, Colin. French Cinema—A Critical Filmography: Volume 2, 1940–1958. Indiana University Press, 2015.
