= Palaces (film) =

1927 film

- Directed by: Jean Durand
- Written by: Jean Durand; Saint-Sorny (novel)
- Starring: Léon Bary; Huguette Duflos; Christiane Favier
- Cinematography: Raymond Agnel; René Colas; Maurice Guillemin
- Production company: Natan Productions
- Distributed by: Les Grands Spectacles Cinématographiques
- Release date: 17 June 1927
- Country: France
- Languages: Silent; French intertitles

Palaces is a 1927 French silent film directed by Jean Durand and starring Léon Bary, Huguette Duflos, and Christiane Favier.

== Cast ==
- Léon Bary as Marquis d'Areghi
- Huguette Duflos as Nadia de Hock
- Christiane Favier as Marie Van Bergen
- Gaston Norès as Dick de Meslay
- Pierre Denols as Baron de Hock
- André Volbert as Raoul Michel
- Blanche Beaume as Madame Bassano
- Madame Desgranges as Madame de Hock
- Norka Rouskaya as herself - the dancer
- José Padilla as himself

== Bibliography ==
- Goble, Alan. The Complete Index to Literary Sources in Film. Walter de Gruyter, 1999.
