= Zigano =

1925 film by Gérard Bourgeois and Harry Piel

- Directed by: Gérard Bourgeois; Harry Piel
- Written by: Henrik Galeen
- Starring: Harry Piel; Denise Legeay; Dary Holm; Olga Limburg
- Cinematography: Georg Muschner; Gotthardt Wolf
- Production companies: Gaumont; Hape-Film
- Distributed by: Bavaria Film
- Release date: 27 July 1925
- Countries: France; Germany
- Languages: Silent; German intertitles

Zigano is a 1925 French-German silent historical adventure film directed by Gérard Bourgeois and Harry Piel and starring Piel, Denise Legeay and Dary Holm. It premiered in Berlin on 27 July 1925.

== Cast ==
- Harry Piel as Benito
- Denise Legeay as Fiametta
- Dary Holm as Beatrice
- Olga Limburg as Teresa
- Fritz Greiner as Statthalter Ganossa
- José Davert as Matteo
- Albert Paulig as Der alte Polizeipräfekt
- Karl Etlinger as Prälat
- Raimondo Van Riel as Herzog Ludowico
- Conte Apoloni as Zigano
- Henrik Galeen

== Bibliography ==
- Grange, William (2008). Cultural Chronicle of the Weimar Republic. Lanham, MD: Scarecrow Press. ISBN 978-0-8108-5967-8.
