= The Loves of Rocambole =

1924 film

- Directed by: Charles Maudru
- Written by: Pierre Alexis Ponson du Terrail (novel)
- Starring: Maurice Thorèze; Claude Mérelle; Albert Decoeur
- Cinematography: Pierre Trimbach
- Production company: Société d'Éditions Cinématographiques
- Distributed by: Etablissements Louis Aubert
- Release date: 7 November 1924
- Country: France
- Languages: Silent; French intertitles

The Loves of Rocambole (French: Les amours de Rocambole) is a 1924 French silent film directed by Charles Maudru and starring Maurice Thorèze, Claude Mérelle and Albert Decoeur.

== Cast ==
- Maurice Thorèze as Rocambole
- Claude Mérelle as Baccara
- Albert Decoeur as Sir William
- Noëlle Rolland as Madame de Chamery
- Max Maxudian as Le maharadjah
- Janie Péra as Carmen de Sallendrera
- Pierre Fresnay as Jean Robert
- Marguerite Ninove as Madame Fipart
- Jean Peyrière as Le duc de Sallendrera
- Willy as Perrine
- Émilien Richard as Le comte de Chamery
- Batréau as Venture
- Pierre Daltour
- Louisa de Mornand
- Germaine Fontanes
- Halma
- Mary Harald
- Olga Noël

== Bibliography ==
- Philippe Rège. Encyclopedia of French Film Directors, Volume 1. Scarecrow Press, 2009.
