= Jacques Robert (film director) =

Jacques Robert-Swiss Film Director

- Born: Jacques Robert Kneubuhler; 1890; Switzerland
- Died: 15 January 1928 (aged 37–38); France
- Occupation(s): Actor, film director

Jacques Robert (1890–1928) was a Swiss silent actor and film director in the 1910s and 1920s.

== Early life ==
Jacques Robert was born in 1890.

== Career ==
Robert started his career as a silent actor by acting in the Count of Monte Cristo film serials directed by Henri Pouctal in the 1910s. He went on to act in films by pioneer directors like Charles Burguet, Gérard Bourgeois, Henri Pouctal, René Leprince, and Léon Poirier, up until 1921. He went on to direct six silent films.

== Death ==
He died on 15 January 1928 in France.

== Filmography ==
=== As an actor ===
- La course du flambeau (dir. Charles Burguet, 1918).
- L'âme de Pierre (dir. Charles Burguet, 1918).
- Le fils de la nuit (dir. Gérard Bourgeois, 1919).
- Travail (dir. Henri Pouctal, 1920).
- La force de la vie (dir. René Leprince, 1920).
- Narayana (dir. Léon Poirier, 1920).
- L'essor (dir. Charles Burguet, 1921).
- L'ombre déchirée (dir. Léon Poirier, 1921).

=== As a director ===
- La vivante épingle (1921).
- La bouquetière des innocents (1923).
- Le cousin Pons (1924).
- Count Kostia (1925).
- La chèvre aux pieds d'or (1926).
- En plongée (1926).
