= The Devil's Holiday (French-language film) =

1931 film

- Directed by: Alberto Cavalcanti
- Written by: Jean Aragny; Alberto Cavalcanti; Edmund Goulding; Georges Neveux
- Starring: Marcelle Chantal; Thomy Bourdelle; Jacques Varennes
- Cinematography: Enzo Riccioni
- Production company: Paramount Pictures
- Distributed by: Paramount Pictures
- Release date: 27 March 1931
- Countries: France; United States
- Language: French

The Devil's Holiday (French: Les vacances du diable) is a 1931 American-French drama film directed by Alberto Cavalcanti and starring Marcelle Chantal, Thomy Bourdelle and Jacques Varennes. It is the French-language version of The Devil's Holiday (1930). It was made at the Joinville Studios in Paris by the French subsidiary of Paramount Pictures which invested heavily in multi-language versions during the early years of sound.

== Cast ==
- Marcelle Chantal as Betty Williams
- Thomy Bourdelle as Mark Stone
- Jacques Varennes as Charlie Thorne
- Robert Hommet as Allan Stone
- Maurice Schutz as David Stone
- Jeanne Fusier-Gir as La standardiste
- Pierre Richard-Willm as Dr. Reynolds
- Louis Kerly as Kent Carr
- Lucien Callamand as Hammond
- Raymond Leboursier as Monk McConnell
- Rachel Launay as Mary
- Charlotte Martens as Anna
- Jeanne Frédérique

== Bibliography ==
- Alan Gevinson. Within Our Gates: Ethnicity in American Feature Films, 1911-1960. University of California Press, 1997.
