= The Crushed Idol =

1920 film

- Directed by: Maurice Mariaud
- Written by: Albert Dieudonné
- Starring: Lina Cavalieri
- Release date: 7 December 1920
- Country: France
- Languages: Silent; French intertitles

The Crushed Idol (French:L'idole brisée) is a 1920 French silent drama film directed by Maurice Mariaud and starring Lina Cavalieri.

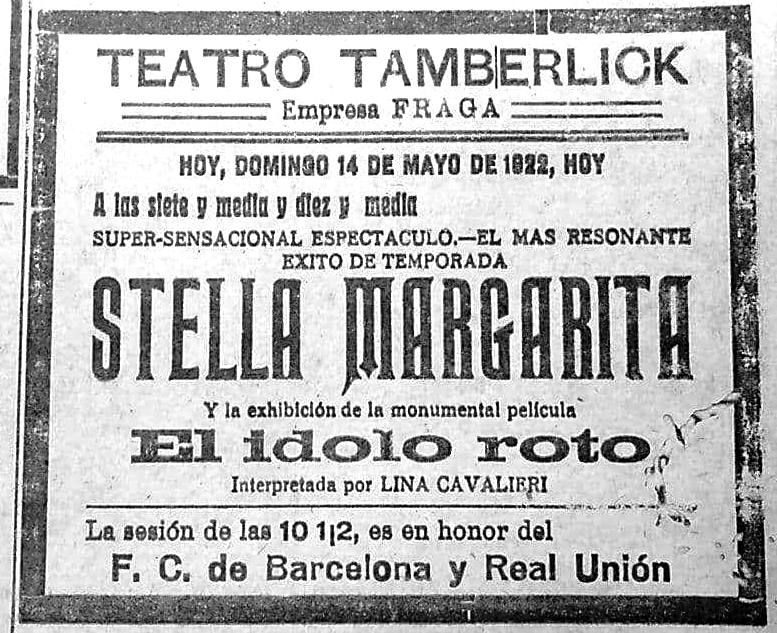

== Cast ==
- Henri Baudin
- Lina Cavalieri
- Laure Dietrich
- Louis Leubas
- Maurice Mariaud

== Bibliography ==
- Paul Fryer, Olga Usova. Lina Cavalieri: The Life of Opera's Greatest Beauty, 1874-1944. McFarland, 2003.
