= Norka Rouskaya =

Swiss dancer

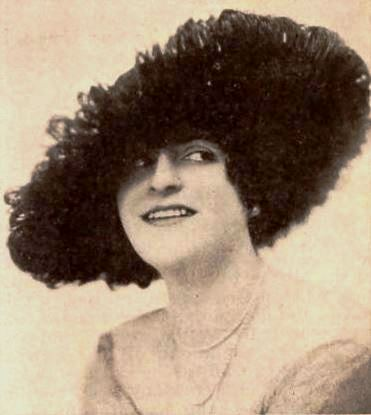
- Royskaya in April 1918.
- Born: Delia Franciscus; 1899; Ticino; Switzerland
- Known for: eccentric dance

Norka Rouskaya (born Delia Franciscus in 1899) was a Swiss eccentric dancer and actress. Her mother was named Mercedes Franciscus.

== Biography ==
Rousaya was born in 1899 in the Canton of Ticino. She trained as a dancer and performed in major theaters in France and Italy. On 5 November 1917 Rouskaya, accompanied by her mother and several local men, including the author José Carlos Marategui, performed an interpretive dance to Chopin's Funeral March in the Cementerio Presbítero Matías Maestro in Lima, Peru. The performance was deemed inappropriate and caused a scandal in Lima society. She was arrested upon her return to the Maury Hotel, where she had been staying, and was taken to the Convent of St. Thomas with her mother, where the women's prison was operated. She was held in the convent under the care of Dominican nuns. She was released from prison on 7 November 1917.

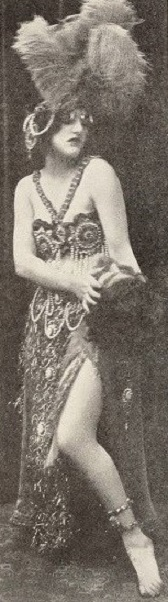
Rouskaya performing in costume.

In 1918 she cancelled a tour to dance in Cuba and South America and went to New York to pursue a career in film. Later that year she made her film debut as a dancer in the film Santa. She played herself in a dancing role in the 1927 French silent film Palaces.
