= Eyes Open, Harry! =

1926 film directed by Harry Piel

- French theatrical release poster
- Directed by: Harry Piel
- Written by: Henrik Galeen
- Starring: Harry Piel
- Cinematography: Georg Muschner; Gotthardt Wolf
- Production company: Phoebus Film
- Release date: 14 September 1926
- Country: Germany
- Languages: Silent; German intertitles

Eyes Open, Harry! (German: Achtung Harry! Augen auf!) is a 1926 German silent thriller film directed by and starring Harry Piel. It was shot at the Staaken Studios in Berlin. The film's sets were designed by Willi Herrmann.

== Cast ==
- Eugen Burg as Graham Horst
- Colette Corder as Rote Gräfin
- Karl Falkenberg as Prinz Achmed
- Jaro Fürth as Chefredakteur
- Georg John as Nathan Miller
- Denise Legeay as Ethel Horst
- Harry Piel as Harry

== Bibliography ==
- Grange, William. Cultural Chronicle of the Weimar Republic. Scarecrow Press, 2008.
