= Jean-François Martial =

Belgian actor (1891–1977)

- Born: Martial Joseph Ghislain Fosseprez; 12 September 1891; Walcourt, Namur, Belgium
- Died: 18 November 1977 (aged 86); Nice, Alpes-Maritimes, France
- Occupation: Actor
- Years active: 1913–1965

Jean-François Martial (12 September 1891 – 18 October 1977) was a Belgian actor who appeared in mostly French films beginning in the silent film era of the early 1910s until his retirement in the early 1960s.

Born Martial Joseph Ghislain Fosseprez in Walcourt, Belgium, Martial's first film known appearance as an actor was in the 1911 Léonce Perret-directed Cœur de mère de. This was followed by a role in the 1913 Louis Feuillade-directed crime drama film serial Fantômas. His last film role would be in the 1964 René Allio-directed film La Vieille Dame indigne.

== Selected filmography ==
- The Clairvoyant (1924)
- Terror (1924)
- My Priest Among the Rich (1925)
- Lady Harrington (1926)
- Apaches of Paris (1927)
- Muche (1927)
- Yvette (1928)
- Accused, Stand Up! (1930)
- The Yellow House of Rio (1931)
- End of the World (1931)
- Fun in the Barracks (1932)
- Wooden Crosses (1932)
- Shadows of Paris (1932)
- Bach the Millionaire (1933)
- The Two Orphans (1933)
- Le Grand Jeu (1934)
- Lady Killer (1937)
- The Kiss of Fire (1937)
- Le Dernier Tournant (1939)
- La Comédie du bonheur (1940)
- The Heart of a Nation (1940)
- Vénus aveugle (1941)
- Melody for You (1942)
- A Woman in the Night (1943)
- The Mysteries of Paris (1943)
- Panic (Panique) (1946)
- Dawn Devils (1946)
- Something to Sing About (1947)
- The Secret of Florida (1947)
- The Red Signal (1949)
- A Change in the Wind (1949)
- Guilty? (1951)
- Napoleon Road (1953)
- Napoléon (1955)
- The Light Across the Street (1956)
- Serenade of Texas (1958)
- Mon Oncle (1958)
