= Happy Couple =

1923 film

- Directed by: Robert Saidreau
- Release date: 2 February 1923
- Running time: 51 minutes
- Country: France
- Languages: Silent; French intertitles

Happy Couple (French:Bonheur conjugal) is a 1923 French silent film directed by Robert Saidreau.

== Cast ==
- André Dubosc
- Pierre Etchepare
- Denise Legeay
- Lucienne Legrand

== Bibliography ==
- Eva Woods Peiró. White Gypsies: Race and Stardom in Spanish Musical Films. U of Minnesota Press, 2012.
