= My Priest Among the Rich (1925 film) =

1925 film

- Directed by: Émile-Bernard Donatien
- Written by: Émile-Bernard Donatien
- Based on: My Priest Among the Rich by Clément Vautel
- Produced by: Louis Aubert
- Starring: Émile-Bernard Donatien; Lucienne Legrand; Louis Kerly
- Cinematography: Robert Filippini
- Production company: Etablissements Louis Aubert
- Distributed by: Etablissements Louis Aubert
- Release date: 1925
- Country: France
- Languages: Silent; French intertitles

My Priest Among the Rich (French: Mon curé chez les riches) is a 1925 French silent comedy film directed by and starring Émile-Bernard Donatien alongside Lucienne Legrand, Louis Kerly and Georges Melchior. It is based on the 1923 novel of the same title by Clément Vautel, which has been made into films several times. It was followed by a sequel My Priest Among the Poor in 1926.

== Cast ==
- Émile-Bernard Donatien as L'abbé Pellegrin
- Lucienne Legrand as Madame Cousinet / Lisette de Lizac
- Louis Kerly as Monsieur Cousinet
- Georges Melchior as Pierre de Sableuse
- Marsa Renhardt as Valérie
- Marguerite de Morlaye as Mademe de Sableuse
- Fabrice as Monseigneur Sibué
- Louise Pager as La dame patronesse
- Jean-François Martial as Bonnard
- Jules de Spoly as Maxy
- Habib Benglia as Le danseur
- André Gargour as Saint-Preux
- Lhuillier as Plumoiseau
- Pauline Carton as Unknown role

== Bibliography ==
- Goble, Alan. The Complete Index to Literary Sources in Film. Walter de Gruyter, 1999.
- Rège, Philippe. Encyclopedia of French Film Directors, Volume 1. Scarecrow Press, 2009.
