= Simone (1926 film) =

1926 film

- Directed by: Émile-Bernard Donatien
- Written by: Eugène Brieux (play); Camille de Morlhon
- Produced by: Louis Aubert
- Cinematography: Alphonse Gibory
- Production company: Etablissements Louis Aubert
- Distributed by: Etablissements Louis Aubert
- Release date: 24 September 1926
- Country: France
- Languages: Silent; French intertitles

Simone is a 1926 French silent drama film directed by Émile-Bernard Donatien, and starring Lucienne Legrand, Jeanne Kervich, and Jean Dehelly. It is based on a play by Eugène Brieux, which had previously been adapted for the big screen in a 1918 silent film of the same name.

== Cast ==
- Lucienne Legrand as Simone de Sergeac
- Jeanne Kervich as Hermance
- Jean Dehelly as Michel Mignier
- Claude France as Madame de Sergeac
- Donatien as Monsieur de Sergeac
- Maxime Desjardins as Monsieur de Lorcy
- Georges de La Noë as Michel's father
- Josseline Gaël as young Simone
- Jean Lorette as Monsieur de Naugeac
- Émilien Richard as the lawyer
- Lionel Salem as the notary

== Bibliography ==
- Goble, Alan. The Complete Index to Literary Sources in Film. Walter de Gruyter, 1999.
