= The Martyrdom of Saint Maxence =

1928 film

- Directed by: Émile-Bernard Donatien
- Starring: Lucienne Legrand; Thomy Bourdelle; Raoul Chennevières
- Cinematography: Jéhan Fouquet
- Release date: 23 March 1928
- Running time: 80 minutes
- Country: France
- Languages: Silent; French intertitles

The Martyrdom of Saint Maxence (French: Le martyre de Sainte-Maxence) is a 1928 French silent historical drama film directed by Donatien and starring Lucienne Legrand, Thomy Bourdelle and Raoul Chennevières.

== Cast ==
- Lucienne Legrand as Maxence
- Thomy Bourdelle as Le chef barbare Sartorek
- Raoul Chennevières as Théobald
- Berthe Jalabert as Rosébie
- Pierre Simon as Lucinius
- Georges Péclet as Michel Brabance
- Alice Desvergers as Tilda
- Jean Diéner as Le grand-prêtre
- Lionel Salem as Hugues Valens
- Suzanne Talba as La favorite

== Bibliography ==
- Rège, Philippe. Encyclopedia of French Film Directors, Volume 1. Scarecrow Press, 2009.
