= The Divine Voyage =

1929 film

- The Divine Voyage by Julien Duvivier
- Directed by: Julien Duvivier
- Written by: Julien Duvivier
- Starring: Jean Murat; Thomy Bourdelle; Suzanne Christy
- Cinematography: André Dantan; Armand Thirard
- Production companies: Films Petit; Le Film d'Art
- Release date: 14 June 1929
- Country: France
- Languages: Silent; French intertitles

The Divine Voyage (French: La divine croisière) is a 1929 French silent film directed by Julien Duvivier and starring Jean Murat, Thomy Bourdelle and Suzanne Christy.

== Cast ==
- Jean Murat as Jacques de Saint-Ermont
- Thomy Bourdelle as Mareuil
- Suzanne Christy as Simone Ferjac
- Charlotte Barbier-Krauss as Mme. de Saint-Ermont
- Line Noro as Jeanne de Guiven
- Louis Kerly as Le curé
- Angèle Decori as Angélique
- Henry Krauss as Claude Ferjac
- Henri Valbel as Kerjean
- Georges Paulais as Le matelot Brélez
- François Viguier as Le Guénec
- Pierre Mindaist
- Alfred Argus

== Bibliography ==
- Eric Bonnefille. Julien Duvivier: 1896-1940. Harmattan, 2002.
