= The Thruster =

1924 film

- Directed by: André Hugon
- Written by: Félicien Champsaur (novel); André Hugon
- Starring: Pierre Blanchar; Jeanne Helbling; Ginette Maddie
- Cinematography: Alfred Guichard; Daniel Quintin
- Production company: Films André Hugon
- Distributed by: Etablissements Louis Aubert
- Release date: 19 September 1924
- Country: France
- Languages: Silent; French intertitles

The Thruster (French:L'arriviste) is a 1924 French silent film directed by André Hugon and starring Pierre Blanchar, Jeanne Helbling and Ginette Maddie.

== Cast ==
- Pierre Blanchar as Jacques de Mirande
- Jeanne Helbling as Marquisette
- Ginette Maddie as Renée April
- Gilbert Dalleu as Chesnard
- Camille Bert as L'inconnu
- Henri Baudin as Claude Barsac
- Jean d'Yd as L'avocat général
- Max Charlier
- Georges Deneubourg
- Henri Deneyrieu as Le notaire
- Alexis Ghasne as Le Président des assises
- Paul Jorge as L'Abbé Bridoux
- Louis Monfils as Le Président de la chambre des députés

== Bibliography ==
- Rège, Philippe. Encyclopedia of French Film Directors, Volume 1. Scarecrow Press, 2009.
