= That Scoundrel Morin (1924 film) =

1924 film directed by Viktor Tourjansky

- Directed by: Viktor Tourjansky
- Written by: Nicolas Rimsky; Viktor Tourjansky
- Based on: That Scoundrel Morin by Guy de Maupassant
- Produced by: Alexandre Kamenka
- Starring: Nicolas Rimsky; Denise Legeay; Louis Monfils
- Cinematography: Nicolas Rimsky; Denise Legeay; Louis Monfils
- Production company: Films Albatros
- Distributed by: Etablissements E. Giraud
- Release date: 11 April 1924
- Running time: 58 minutes
- Country: France
- Languages: Silent; French intertitles

That Scoundrel Morin (French: Ce cochon de Morin) is a 1924 French silent comedy film directed by Viktor Tourjansky and starring Nicolas Rimsky, Denise Legeay and Louis Monfils. The film's sets were designed by the art directors Eduardo Gosch and Alexandre Lochakoff.

== Cast ==
- Nicolas Rimsky as M. Morin
- Denise Legeay as Henriette
- Louis Monfils as L'oncle Tonnelet
- Jacques Guilhène as Labarbe
- René Donnio as Le pianiste
- K. Melnikova as Mme. Morin

== Bibliography ==
- Connelly, Robert B. The Silents: Silent Feature Films, 1910-36, Volume 40, Issue 2. December Press, 1998.
- Powrie, Phil & Rebillard, Éric. Pierre Batcheff and stardom in 1920s French cinema. Edinburgh University Press, 2009.
