= Nile Water =

1928 film

- Directed by: Marcel Vandal
- Written by: Pierre Frondaie (novel)
- Produced by: Louis Aubert
- Starring: Jean Murat; Max Maxudian; Lee Parry
- Cinematography: Michel Bernheim; René Guichard; Armand Thirard
- Production company: Les Films Marcel Vandal et Charles Delac
- Release date: 18 October 1928
- Country: France
- Language: French

Nile Water (French: L'eau du Nil) is a 1928 French drama film directed by Marcel Vandal and starring Jean Murat, Max Maxudian and Lee Parry. Originally made as a silent film, it subsequently had a musical soundtrack added to it. It was the first French sound film, shot using a system owned by Gaumont. However, the system never took off and American and German technology came to dominate.

The film's sets were designed by the art director Fernand Delattre.

== Main cast ==
- Jean Murat as Pierre Levannier
- Max Maxudian as Wirsocq
- Lee Parry as Anne Marie
- René Lefèvre as Arthur de Sorgepoix
- Gaston Jacquet as Basil Lescoe
- Anita Labartha as Danseuse

== Bibliography ==
- Crisp, C.G. The Classic French Cinema, 1930-1960. Indiana University Press, 1993.
- Kindem, Gorham Anders. The International Movie Industry. SIU Press, 2000.
