= Terror (1924 film) =

1924 film

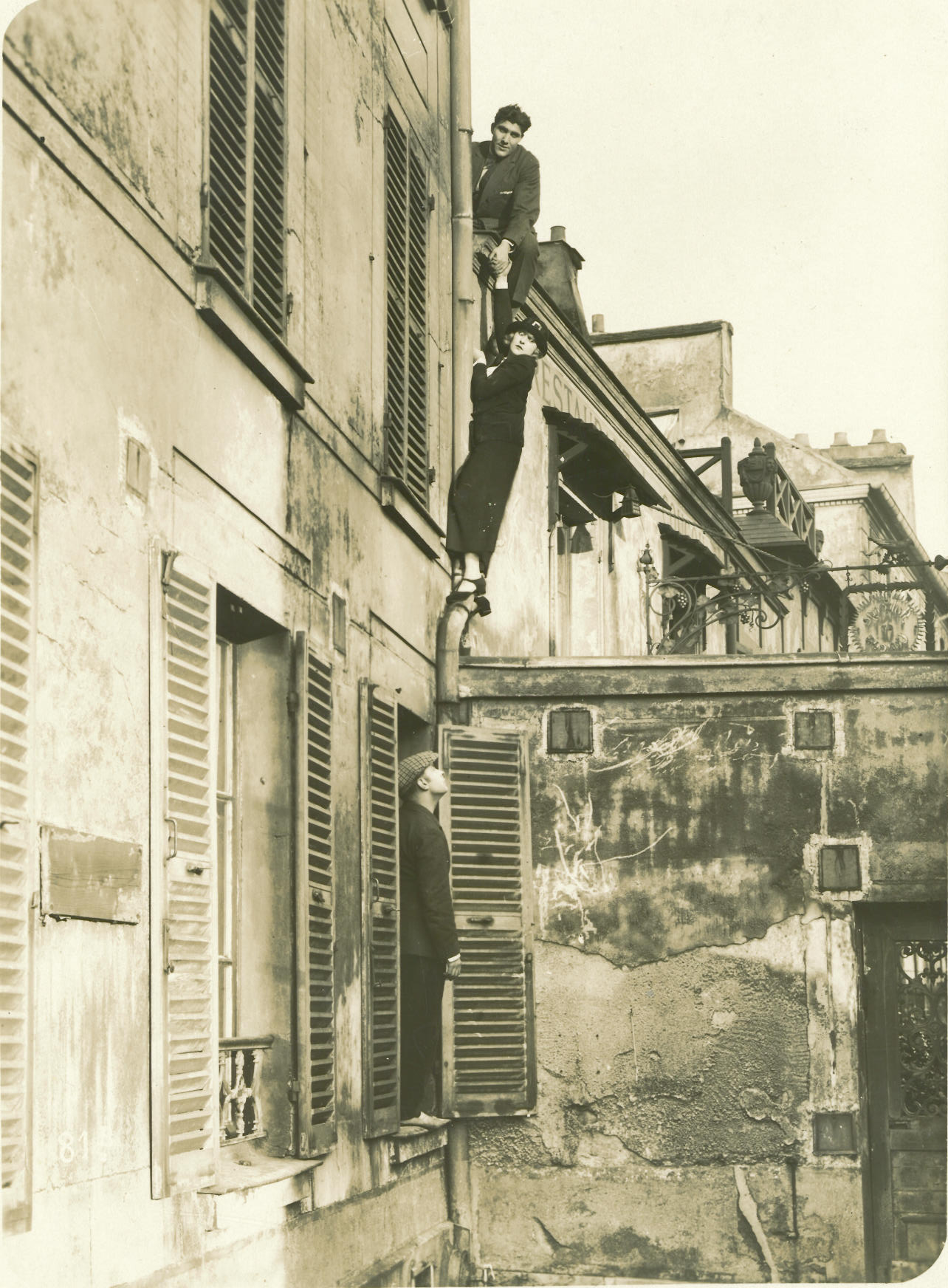
- Film still
- Directed by: Edward José; Gérard Bourgeois
- Written by: Gérard Bourgeois
- Starring: Pearl White; Henri Baudin; Arlette Marchal
- Cinematography: Raymond Agnel; Jacques Bizeul
- Production company: Films Fordys
- Distributed by: Etablissements E. Giraud; Film Booking Offices of America (U.S)
- Release date: 2 May 1924 (France)
- Running time: 74 minutes
- Country: France
- Language: Silent (French intertitles)

Terror (French: Terreur) is a 1924 French silent drama film directed by Edward José and Gérard Bourgeois and starring Pearl White, Henri Baudin, and Arlette Marchal. It was the final film of the American actress White, known for her roles in serials such as The Perils of Pauline. It is sometimes known by the alternative title The Perils of Paris.

== Plot ==
As described in a film magazine review, Helen Aldrich, a young American sculptor in Paris, has an unexpected adventure with a young Apache who visits her with the intention of obtaining her jewels, changes his mind, and agrees to pose for her. They fall in love. Professor Aldrich, her father, is the inventor of a death ray which is expected to accomplish great things in war. The secret is stolen and Helen's lover is suspected of the theft, so Helen sets out to prove his innocence. She does, after meeting with a variety of adventures, clearing the man she loves, and effecting the arrest of the gang leader.

== Cast ==
- Pearl White as Hélène Lorfeuil
- Henri Baudin as Lorfeuil
- Robert Lee as Roger Durand
- Hugues Mitchell as Prince de Mesnevil
- Arlette Marchal as Madame Gauthier
- Paul Vermoyal as Erdmann
- Marcel Vibert as Duc de Morailles
- Raoul Paoli as Prof. d'éducation physique
- Émile Piotte as Dr. Rafaël
- Martial Verdellet as Secrétaire du professeur
- Huguette Delacroix as Madame Durand, mère
- Renée Gerville as La soubrette
- Jean-François Martial as Le domestique

== Bibliography ==
- Rudmer Canjels. Distributing Silent Film Serials: Local Practices, Changing Forms, Cultural Transformation. Routledge, 2011. ISBN 978-1-13683-735-7
