= Jean Chouan (film) =

1926 film

- Directed by: Luitz-Morat
- Written by: Arthur Bernède
- Starring: René Navarre; Marthe Chaumont; Maurice Lagrenée
- Cinematography: Frank Daniau-Johnston; Georges Daret; Henri Stuckert
- Production company: Société des Cinéromans
- Distributed by: Pathé Consortium Cinéma
- Release date: 22 January 1926
- Running time: 412 min
- Country: France
- Languages: Silent; French intertitles

Jean Chouan is a 1926 French silent historical film directed by Luitz-Morat and starring René Navarre, Marthe Chaumont and Maurice Lagrenée. It is set at the time of the French Revolution, when Jean Chouan took part in a counterrevolutionary uprising.

== Cast ==
- René Navarre as Maxime Ardouin - le délégué aux armées de la République
- Marthe Chaumont as Marie-Claire, La fille de Maxime aimée de Jacques
- Maurice Lagrenée as Jacques Cottereau
- Maurice Schutz as Jean Cottereau / Jean Chouan - un vieux Vendéen royaliste
- Claude Mérelle as Maryse Fleurus
- Elmire Vautier as La marquise de Thorigné
- Anna Lefeuvrier as Marie-Victoire Lefranc
- Jean-Paul de Baere as Nicolas Lefranc
- Albert Decoeur as Guillaume Lefranc
- Jean Debucourt as Maximilien de Robespierre
- René Vignières as Louis-Antoine de Saint-Just
- Daniel Mendaille as François Marceau
- Thomy Bourdelle as Kléber
- Paul Amiot as Le marquis de Thorigné
- Yvette Armel
- William Burke as Jean-Marie Collot d'Herbois
- Jacques Cléry as La Rochejaquelein
- Engeldorff
- Marthe Jessy
- Maurice Mariaud
- Ray-Roy
- Cesar-Tullio Terrore as Pierre Florent

== Bibliography ==
- Dayna Oscherwitz. Past Forward: French Cinema and the Post-Colonial Heritage. SIU Press, 2010.
