= I Have Killed =

1924 film

- Sessue Hayakawa and Denise Legeay in a film still.
- Directed by: Roger Lion
- Written by: Frances Guihan; Roger Lion
- Produced by: Richard-Pierre Bodin
- Starring: Sessue Hayakawa; Huguette Duflos; Max Maxudian
- Cinematography: Paul Castanet; Segundo de Chomón; Maurice Desfassiaux
- Production company: Films Thyra
- Distributed by: Productions Jean de Merly; Wardour Films (UK)
- Release date: 25 October 1924
- Running time: 90 minutes
- Country: France
- Languages: Silent; French intertitles

I Have Killed (French: J'ai tué!) is a 1924 French silent crime drama film directed by Roger Lion and starring Sessue Hayakawa, Huguette Duflos and Max Maxudian. The film's sets were designed by the art director Émile-Bernard Donatien. It was released in the United Kingdom as Loyalty.

== Cast ==
- Sessue Hayakawa as Hideo - l'antiquaire japonais
- Huguette Duflos as Huguette Dumontal
- Max Maxudian as Le professeur Dumontal - un orientaliste
- Maurice Sigrist as Gérard Dumontal
- Pierre Daltour as Harry Verian - l'amant
- Jules de Spoly as Comte Ricardo
- Denise Legeay as La baronne de Calix
- André Volbert as Commissaire
- Maurice Luguet as Président des assises
- Paulette Ray as Geneviève Irvin/Marcelle Irvin
- Simone Mareuil as Une servante
- Christian Dauvilliers
- Julio de Romero
- Joaquín Carrasco
- Georges Deneubourg

== Bibliography ==
- Kennedy-Karpat, Colleen. Rogues, Romance, and Exoticism in French Cinema of the 1930s. Fairleigh Dickinson, 2013.
- Miyao, Daisuke . Sessue Hayakawa: Silent Cinema and Transnational Stardom. Duke University Press, 28 Mar 2007
- Rège, Philippe. Encyclopedia of French Film Directors, Volume 1. Scarecrow Press, 2009.
