= En plongée =

1926 film

- Directed by: Jacques Robert
- Produced by: Société des cinémaromans
- Starring: Lilian Constantini; Daniel Mendaille; Pierre Alcover
- Release date: 1926
- Country: France
- Language: French

En plongée was a 1926 French film directed by Jacques Robert. It was based on Fragments d'épaves, a novel by Bernard Frank. It was shot in Monaco, but set in Brittany. It is a spy film.

It was reviewed in Cinémagazine in 1928.

== Cast ==
- Lilian Constantini - La princesse Nouriskine
- Daniel Mendaille - Maurice de Vergnes, un officier de marine
- Pierre Alcover - Howell
- Olga Noël - Anna Guérec de Vergnes, la femme de Maurice
- Mathilde Alberti - Moussia Fedorovna, une espionne, l'ex fiancée de Maurice
- Harry Arbell - Le Bozec
- Claire Darcas - Madame Howell
- Boris de Fast John
- Henri Desmarets - Karl
- Jean Napoléon Michel - Frantz
- Pierre Séguier - Pierre
