= Jules de Spoly =

Russian-born French actor and journalist

- Born: Aminad Petrovic Spolânskij; 25 April 1884; Moscow, Russian Empire
- Died: 14 November 1957 (aged 73); Paris, France
- Other name: Aminade Spoliansky
- Occupation: Actor
- Years active: 1921–1926 (film)

Jules de Spoly (1884–1957) was a Russian-born French journalist and stage and film actor of the silent era. At one point he managed the Théâtre Daunou in Paris.

== Selected filmography ==
- Le coffret de jade (1921)
- L'enfant du carnaval (1921)
- Lord Arthur Savile's Crime (1922)
- The Mysteries of Paris (1922)
- Parisette (1922)
- The King of Paris (1923)
- Le brasier ardent (1923)
- Koenigsmark (1923)
- Loyalty (1924)
- Le double amour (1925)
- Les aventures de Robert Macaire (1925)
- My Priest Among the Rich (1925)
- My Priest Among the Poor (1926)
- Pour régner (1926)

== Bibliography ==
- Albera, François. Albatros: des russes à Paris, 1919–1929. Mazzotta, 1995.
- Dumont, Hervé. Contes et légendes d'Orient: au cinéma et à la télévision. 2017.
