= My Priest Among the Poor (1926 film) =

1926 film

- Directed by: Émile-Bernard Donatien
- Written by: Camille de Morlhon
- Based on: My Priest Among the Poor by Clément Vautel
- Produced by: Louis Aubert
- Starring: Émile-Bernard Donatien; Lucienne Legrand; Louis Kerly
- Cinematography: Robert Filippini
- Production company: Etablissements Louis Aubert
- Distributed by: Etablissements Louis Aubert
- Release date: 1926
- Country: France
- Languages: Silent; French intertitles

My Priest Among the Poor (French: Mon curé chez les pauvres) is a 1926 French silent comedy film directed by and starring Émile-Bernard Donatien and starring Lucienne Legrand, Louis Kerly and Jules de Spoly. It is based on the 1925 novel of the same title by Clément Vautel and is a sequel to My Priest Among the Rich.

== Cast ==
- Émile-Bernard Donatien as L'abbé Pellegrin
- Lucienne Legrand as Madame Cousinet
- Louis Kerly as Cousinet
- Jules de Spoly as Maxy
- Johanna Sutter as Jeanne Réveil
- Marsa Renhardt as Valérie
- Enrique Rivero as Raymond Maxy
- Robert Guilbert as Pierre Rouge
- Fabrice as Monseigneur Sibue
- André Gargour as Saint-Preux

== Bibliography ==
- Goble, Alan. The Complete Index to Literary Sources in Film. Walter de Gruyter, 1999.
- Rège, Philippe. Encyclopedia of French Film Directors, Volume 1. Scarecrow Press, 2009.
