= Jocaste (film) =

1925 film

- Directed by: Gaston Ravel
- Written by: Anatole France (novel); Gaston Ravel
- Starring: Thomy Bourdelle; Claude Mérelle; Sandra Milovanoff
- Cinematography: Georges Lafont; Henri Stuckert
- Production company: Films de France
- Distributed by: Pathé Consortium Cinéma
- Release date: 15 May 1925
- Country: France
- Languages: Silent; French intertitles

Jocaste is a 1925 French silent drama film directed by Gaston Ravel and starring Thomy Bourdelle, Claude Mérelle and Sandra Milovanoff.

== Cast ==
- Thomy Bourdelle as Dr. René Longuemarre
- Claude Mérelle as Jocaste
- Sandra Milovanoff as Hélène Haviland
- Gabriel Signoret as Martin Haviland
- Abel Tarride as Fellaire de Sizac
- Henri Fabert as Dr. Groult
- Jean Forest as Georges Haviland
- Simone Mareuil as Maîtresse de Fellaire de Sizac

== Bibliography ==
- Alfred Krautz. International directory of cinematographers, set- and costume designers in film, Volume 4. Saur, 1984.
