= Princess Lulu (film) =

1925 film

- Directed by: Émile-Bernard Donatien; René Leprince
- Written by: Émile-Bernard Donatien; Camille de Morlhon
- Produced by: Louis Aubert
- Starring: Pierre Batcheff; Lucienne Legrand; Camille Bert
- Cinematography: Émile Repelin; Samuel Schnegg
- Edited by: Émile-Bernard Donatien
- Production companies: Etablissements Louis Aubert; Agence Suisse du Cinéma
- Distributed by: Star Films Edition
- Release date: 14 August 1925
- Running time: 85 minutes
- Countries: France; Switzerland
- Languages: Silent; French intertitles

Princess Lulu (French: Princesse Lulu) is a 1925 French-Swiss silent drama film directed by Émile-Bernard Donatien and René Leprince and starring Pierre Batcheff, Lucienne Legrand and Camille Bert. It was shot at the Cité Elgé Studios in Paris and on location around Montreux in Switzerland and Meillerie in Savoy.

== Cast ==
- Pierre Batcheff as Raoul Brounet - le 'prince'
- Lucienne Legrand as Lulu Juillard
- Émile-Bernard Donatien as Gingolph
- Camille Bert as Monsieur Juillard
- Gil Clary as Madame Juillard
- Isidore Alpha as Le groom

== Bibliography ==
- Powrie, Phil & Rebillard, Éric . Pierre Batcheff and Stardom in 1920s French Cinema. Edinburgh University Press, 2009.
- Rège, Philippe. Encyclopedia of French Film Directors, Volume 1. Scarecrow Press, 2009.
