= Cousin Bette (1928 film) =

1928 film

- Directed by: Max de Rieux
- Written by: Honoré de Balzac (novel)
- Starring: Germaine Rouer; Henri Baudin; Alice Tissot
- Cinematography: Maurice Guillemin
- Production company: Astor Films
- Distributed by: Films P.J. de Venloo
- Release date: 30 November 1928
- Country: France
- Languages: Silent; French intertitles

Cousin Bette (French: La cousine Bette) is a 1928 French silent historical drama film directed by Max de Rieux and starring Germaine Rouer, Henri Baudin and Alice Tissot. It is based on the 1846 novel Cousin Bette by Honoré de Balzac.

The film's sets were designed by the art director Claude Dauphin.

== Cast ==
- Germaine Rouer as Valérie Marneffe
- Henri Baudin as Baron Hulot
- Alice Tissot as Elisabeth ' Lisbeth ' Fisher, la cousine Bette
- Charles Lamy as Marneffe
- François Rozet as Le comte Wenceslas Steinbock
- Suzy Pierson as Josepha
- Jane Huteau as Jenny Cadine
- Léon Guillot de Saix as Claude Vignon
- Mansuelle as Célestin Crevel
- Andrée Brabant as La comtesse Hortense Steinbock
- Maria Carli as Adeline, baronne Hulot d'Ervy Hulot
- Nell Haroun as Le baron Montejanes

== Bibliography ==
- Goble, Alan. The Complete Index to Literary Sources in Film. Walter de Gruyter, 1999.
