= 1924 in film =

This is an overview of 1924 in film, including significant events, a list of films released and notable births and deaths.

== Top-grossing films (U.S.) ==
The top ten 1924 released films by box office gross in North America are as follows:

Highest-grossing films of 1924
Rank	Title	Studio	Domestic rentals
1	The Sea Hawk	First National	$2,000,000
2	Girl Shy	Pathé Exchange	$1,550,000
3	Secrets	First National	$1,500,000
4	The Thief of Bagdad	United Artists	$1,490,419
5	Hot Water	Pathé Exchange	$1,350,000
6	Feet of Clay	Paramount	$904,383
7	Triumph	Paramount	$678,526
8	He Who Gets Slapped	Metro-Goldwyn-Mayer	$493,000
9	Beau Brummel	Warner Bros.	$453,000
10	His Hour	Metro-Goldwyn-Mayer	$418,000

== Events ==
- January 10 – CBC Distributions corp. is renamed and incorporated as Columbia Pictures. D. W. Griffith, co-founder of United Artists, leaves the company.
- April 17 – Entertainment entrepreneur Marcus Loew gains control of Metro Pictures, Goldwyn Pictures Corporation and Louis B. Mayer Pictures to create Metro-Goldwyn-Mayer (MGM)
- July 1 - A boycott of Hollywood films in Japan, organised by the distributors Nikkatsu, Shochiku, and Teikine, goes into effect in response to the United States' Immigration Act.
- July 12 - Japanese film distributors' boycott of Hollywood films ends with participating cinemas "suffering heavy losses of patronage".
- November 15 – In Los Angeles, director Thomas Ince ("The Father of the Western") meets publishing tycoon William Randolph Hearst to work out a deal. When Ince dies a few days later, reportedly of a heart attack, rumors soon surface that he was murdered by Hearst.
- Loews Theatres acquires the 4,000 seat Capitol Theatre in New York City becoming the flagship of the theatre chain and site of many future MGM premieres.
- Joseph Schenck becomes president of United Artists.
- Metro-Goldwyn-Mayer (MGM) considers making a film of The Wonderful Wizard of Oz. MGM and the estate of L. Frank Baum fail to come to an agreement so the rights are sold to Chadwick Pictures.

== Notable films released in 1924 ==
For the complete list of US film releases for the year, see United States films of 1924

=== A ===
- Aelita, directed by Yakov Protazanov – (U.S.S.R.)
- The Alaskan (lost), directed by Herbert Brenon, starring Thomas Meighan and Estelle Taylor
- Along Came Ruth (lost), directed by Edward F. Cline, starring Viola Dana
- America, directed by D. W. Griffith, Neil Hamilton and Lionel Barrymore
- Au Secours! (Help!), directed by Abel Gance, starring Max Linder – (France)

=== B ===
- Ballet Mécanique, directed by Fernand Léger and Dudley Murphy – (France)
- Beau Brummel, directed by Harry Beaumont, starring John Barrymore and Mary Astor
- Behind the Curtain, directed by Chester M. Franklin, based on a story by William J. Flynn

=== C ===
- Captain January directed by Edward F. Cline, starring Baby Peggy and Hobart Bosworth
- Carlos and Elisabeth, directed by Richard Oswald, starring Conrad Veidt – (Germany)
- Claude Duval, directed by George A. Cooper, starring Fay Compton and Nigel Barrie – (GB)
- The City Without Jews (Die Stadt ohne Juden), directed by Hans Karl Breslauer – (Austria)

=== D ===
- Dante's Inferno, directed by Henry Otto
- The Dixie Handicap (lost), directed by Reginald Barker

=== E ===
- The Enchanted Cottage, directed by John S. Robertson, starring Richard Barthelmess and May McAvoy
- Entr'acte, directed by René Clair – (France)
- The Extraordinary Adventures of Mr. West in the Land of the Bolsheviks (Neobychainye priklyucheniya mistera Vesta v strane bolshevikov), directed by Lev Kuleshov – (U.S.S.R.)

=== F ===
- Forbidden Paradise, directed by Ernst Lubitsch, starring Pola Negri, Rod La Rocque and Adolphe Menjou
- The Further Mysteries of Dr. Fu Manchu, eight-part series directed by A. E. Coleby – (GB)

=== G ===
- Girl Shy, directed by Fred C. Newmeyer and Sam Taylor, starring Harold Lloyd and Jobyna Ralston
- The Grand Duke's Finances (Die Finanzen des Großherzogs), directed by F. W. Murnau – (Germany)
- The Great Well, directed by Henry Kolker – (GB)
- Greed, directed by Erich von Stroheim, starring Gibson Gowland and ZaSu Pitts

=== H ===
- Happiness, directed by King Vidor, starring Laurette Taylor
- The Hands of Orlac (Orlacs Hände), directed by Robert Wiene, starring Conrad Veidt, based on the 1920 novel by Maurice Renard – (Austria)
- He Who Gets Slapped, directed by Victor Sjöström starring Lon Chaney, Norma Shearer and John Gilbert
- Helena, directed by Manfred Noa – (Germany)
- Helen's Babies, directed by William A. Seiter, starring Edward Everett Horton, Baby Peggy and Clara Bow
- Her Night of Romance, directed by Sidney Franklin, starring Constance Talmadge and Ronald Colman
- His Hour, directed by King Vidor, starring John Gilbert
- Hot Water, directed by Fred C. Newmeyer and Sam Taylor, starring Harold Lloyd and Jobyna Ralston
- The Humming Bird, directed by Sidney Olcott, starring Gloria Swanson

=== I ===
- Icebound (lost), directed by William C. deMille, starring Lois Wilson and Richard Dix
- L'Inhumaine (The Inhuman Woman), directed by Marcel L'Herbier – (France)
- The Iron Horse, directed by John Ford, starring George O'Brien and Madge Bellamy
- Isn't Life Wonderful, directed by D. W. Griffith

=== J ===
- Janice Meredith, directed by E. Mason Hopper, starring Marion Davies

=== L ===
- The Last Laugh (Der Letzte Mann), directed by F. W. Murnau, starring Emil Jannings – (Germany)
- Little Robinson Crusoe, directed by Edward F. Cline, starring Jackie Coogan

=== M ===
- The Marriage Circle, directed by Ernst Lubitsch
- Michael, directed by Carl Theodor Dreyer – (Germany)
- Monsieur Beaucaire, directed by Sidney Olcott, starring Rudolph Valentino, Bebe Daniels and Lois Wilson

=== N ===
- The Navigator, a Buster Keaton film
- Die Nibelungen: Siegfried, directed by Fritz Lang; starring Paul Richter – (Germany)
- Die Nibelungen: Kriemhilds Rache, directed by Fritz Lang – (Germany)

=== O ===
- On Time (lost), directed by Henry Lehrman, starring Richard Talmadge
- Open All Night, directed by Paul Bern, starring Viola Dana

=== P ===
- Paris Qui Dort (Paris Which Sleeps), directed by René Clair – (France)
- The Passionate Adventure, directed by Graham Cutts, starring Alice Joyce, Clive Brook and Victor McLaglen – (GB)
- Peter Pan, directed by Herbert Brenon, starring Betty Bronson and Ernest Torrence

=== Q ===
- Quo Vadis, directed by Gabriellino D'Annunzio and Georg Jacoby, starring Emil Jannings – (Italy)

=== S ===
- The Saga of Gosta Berling (Gösta Berlings Saga), directed by Mauritz Stiller, starring Greta Garbo and Lars Hanson – (Sweden)
- Sampaguita, directed by José Nepomuceno – (Philippines)
- The Sea Hawk, directed by Frank Lloyd, starring Milton Sills
- Secrets, directed by Frank Borzage, starring Norma Talmadge
- The Shadow of the Desert (lost), directed by George Archainbaud, starring Mildred Harris and Norman Kerry
- Sherlock Jr., a Buster Keaton film
- A Son of Satan (lost), written and directed by Oscar Micheaux
- Stupid, But Brave, directed by William Goodrich (Roscoe "Fatty" Arbuckle)
- Symphonie diagonale, directed by Viking Eggeling – (Germany)

=== T ===
- The Thief of Bagdad, directed by Raoul Walsh, starring Douglas Fairbanks
- Those Who Dare (lost), directed by John B. O'Brien
- Three Weeks, directed by Alan Crosland, starring Conrad Nagel and Aileen Pringle
- Three Women, directed by Ernst Lubitsch, starring May McAvoy, Pauline Frederick and Marie Prevost

=== U ===
- Unseen Hands, directed by Jacques Jaccard, starring Wallace Beery

=== W ===
- Waxworks (Das Wachsfigurenkabinett), directed by Paul Leni, starring Emil Jannings, Conrad Veidt and Werner Krauss – (Germany)
- What an Eye, written and directed by Edward Ludwig
- Wild Oranges, directed by King Vidor
- Wine (lost), directed by Louis J. Gasnier, starring Clara Bow
- Wine of Youth, directed by King Vidor, starring Eleanor Boardman and William Haines

=== Y ===
- Yolanda, directed by Robert G. Vignola, starring Marion Davies

== Short film series ==
- Buster Keaton (1917–1941)
- Our Gang (1922–1944)

== Animated short film series ==
- Koko the Clown (1919–1934)
- Felix the Cat (1919–1936)
- Alice Comedies (1923–1927)
  - Alice's Day at Sea
  - Alice's Spooky Adventure
  - Alice's Wild West Show
  - Alice's Fishy Story
  - Alice and the Dog-Catcher
  - Alice the Peacemaker
  - Alice Gets in Dutch
  - Alice Hunting in Africa
  - Alice and the Three Bears
  - Alice the Piper

== Births ==
- January 5 - Beatrice Winde, American actress (died 2004)
- January 8 – Ron Moody, English actor (died 2015)
- January 9 – Anne Vernon, French actress
- January 9 – Sergei Parajanov, Soviet director (died 1990)
- January 14 – Carole Cook, American actress (died 2023)
- January 16 – Katy Jurado, Mexican actress (died 2002)
- January 21 – Benny Hill, English actor, comedian, singer and writer (died 1992)
- January 26 – Armand Gatti, French filmmaker (died 2017)
- January 27 - Sabu, Indian actor (died 1963)
- January 29 – Dorothy Malone, American actress (died 2018)
- February 9 – Woody Woodbury, American comedian and actor
- February 12 – Louis Zorich, American actor (died 2018)
- February 19 – Lee Marvin, American actor (died 1987)
- March 3 – John Woodnutt, British actor (died 2006)
- March 5 – Harvey Bernhard, American producer (died 2014)
- March 12 – Helen Parrish, American actress (died 1959)
- March 13 – Norma Michaels, American actress (died 2020)
- March 15 – Walter Gotell, German actor (died 1997)
- March 24 – Norman Fell, American actor (died 1998)
- March 25 – Machiko Kyō, Japanese actress (died 2019)
- April 3 – Marlon Brando, American actor (died 2004)
- April 4 – Noreen Nash, American actress (died 2023)
- April 7
  - Astrid Lepa, Estonian actress and director (died 2015)
  - Espen Skjønberg, Norwegian actor (died 2022)
- April 13 – Stanley Donen, American director and choreographer (died 2019)
- April 14
  - Joseph Ruskin, American actor (died 2013)
  - Philip Stone, English actor (died 2003)
- April 18 – Leida Rammo, Estonian actress (died 2020)
- April 19 – Tatiana Farnese, Italian actress (died 2022)
- April 20
  - Nina Foch, Dutch-American actress (died 2008)
  - Leslie Phillips, English comic actor (died 2022)
- April 24
  - Ruth Kobart, American performer (died 2002)
  - Eric Pleskow, Austrian film producer (died 2019)
- April 29 – Heikki Haravee, Estonian actor (died 2003)
- May 1
  - Dodo Abashidze, Soviet Georgian director (died 1990)
  - Art Fleming, American actor and television host (died 1995)
- May 2 – Theodore Bikel, Austrian-American actor (died 2015)
- May 3 – Jane Morgan, American actress and singer (died 2025)
- May 5 – Shekhar Chatterjee, Indian actor and director (died 1990)
- May 6 – Laurie Webb, Welsh actor (died 2026)
- May 18 – Priscilla Pointer, American actress (died 2025)
- May 23 – Bill McCutcheon, American character actor (died 2002)
- May 25 – Walter Schultheiß, German actor (died 2025)
- June 2 – Al Ruscio, American character actor (died 2013)
- June 4 – Dennis Weaver, American actor, SAG president (died 2006)
- June 16 – Faith Domergue, American actress (died 1999)
- June 21 – Ezzatolah Entezami, Iranian actor (died 2018)
- June 25 – Sidney Lumet, American director (died 2011)
- July 1 – Florence Stanley, American actress (died 2003)
- July 3 – Amalia Aguilar, Cuban-born Mexican actress (died 2021)
- July 4 – Eva Marie Saint, American actress (died 2026)
- July 6
  - Draga Ahačič, Slovene actress and director (died 2022)
  - Donald Pelmear, British actor (died 2025)
- July 10 – Gloria Stroock, American actress (died 2024)
- July 14 – Val Avery, American actor (died 2009)
- July 19 – Pat Hingle, American actor (died 2009)
- July 20 – Lola Albright, American actress (died 2017)
- July 21 – Don Knotts, American actor (died 2006)
- July 25 – Alice Toen, Belgian actress
- July 29 – Lloyd Bochner, Canadian actor (died 2005)
- August 1 – Marcia Mae Jones, American actress (died 2007)
- August 2 – Carroll O'Connor, American actor (died 2001)
- August 10 – Martha Hyer, American actress (died 2014)
- August 13 – Meta Velander, Swedish actress (died 2025)
- August 14 – Eduardo Fajardo, Spanish actor (died 2019)
- August 19 – William Marshall, American actor (died 2003)
- August 21 – Jack Weston, American actor (died 1996)
- August 24 – Jimmy Gardner, English actor (died 2010)
- August 28 – Peggy Ryan, American actress and dancer (died 2004)
- August 29 – Tanis Chandler, French-born American actress (died 2006)
- August 31 – Buddy Hackett, American actor, comedian and singer (died 2003)
- September 1 – Hal Douglas, American voice actor (died 2014)
- September 2 – Knud Leif Thomsen, Danish director and screenwriter (died 2003)
- September 6 – Riccardo Cucciolla, Italian actor and voice actor (died 1999)
- September 8 – Denise Darcel, French actress (died 2011)
- September 9
  - Jane Greer, American actress (died 2001)
  - Sylvia Miles, American actress (died 2019)
- September 11 – David Morris, English actor (died 2007)
- September 13
  - Norman Alden, American character actor (died 2012)
  - Scott Brady, American actor (died 1985)
- September 16 – Lauren Bacall, American actress (died 2014)
- September 21 – Gail Russell, American actress (died 1961)
- September 23 – Bob Herron, American stuntman and actor (died 2021)
- September 28 – Marcello Mastroianni, Italian actor (died 1996)
- September 29 – Peter Arne, British character actor (died 1983)
- September 30 – Truman Capote, American author (died 1984)
- October 1 – Jose Corazon de Jesus Jr., Filipino actor (died 1970)
- October 12 – Doris Grau, American script supervisor, actress and voice artist (died 1995)
- October 14 – Robert Webber, American actor (died 1989)
- October 16 - Edgar Scherick, American producer (died 2002)
- October 21 – Joyce Randolph, American actress (died 2024)
- October 22 – Teresa Cunillé, Spanish actress
- October 24 – Mark Lenard, American actor (died 1996)
- October 25 – Billy Barty, American actor (died 2000)
- November 2 – Nadia Cattouse, Belize-British actress (died 2024)
- November 8 – Joe Flynn (American actor), American actor (died 1974)
- November 10
  - Russell Johnson, American actor (died 2014)
  - Paul Richards, American actor (died 1974)
- November 16 – Remo Remotti, Italian actor (died 2015)
- November 19 – William Russell, English actor (died 2024)
- November 20 – Mark Miller, American actor (died 2022)
- November 21 – Joseph Campanella, American actor (died 2018)
- November 22 – Geraldine Page, American actress (died 1987)
- December 2
  - Jonathan Frid, Canadian actor (died 2012)
  - Vilgot Sjöman, Swedish director (died 2006)
- December 5 – George Savalas, American actor (died 1985)
- December 13 – Maria Riva, American actress and writer (died 2025)
- December 14
  - John Franklyn-Robbins, English actor (died 2009)
  - Raj Kapoor, Indian actor, director and producer (died 1988)
- December 19 – Cicely Tyson, American actress, model and author (died 2021)
- December 19 – Edmund Purdom, English actor, voice artist and director (died 2009)
- December 25 – Rod Serling, American screenwriter (died 1975)
- December 31 – Taylor Mead, American actor (died 2013)

== Deaths ==
- April 16 – Amleto Novelli, Italian stage and screen actor (born in 1885)
- April 21 – Eleonora Duse, Italian veteran stage actress, who made one film in 1916 (born in 1858)
- August 9 – L. Rogers Lytton, American stage and screen actor (born in 1867)
- September 23 – Ben Deeley, film actor married to Barbara La Marr (born in 1878)
- October 12 – Kate Lester, English veteran stage and film actress (born in 1857)
- November 19 – Thomas Ince, American actor and pioneer film producer (born in 1880)

== Film debuts ==
- Brian Aherne – The Eleventh Commandment
- George Brent – The Iron Horse
- Mary Brian – Peter Pan
- Walter Catlett – Second Youth
- Marcelle Corday – The Red Lily
- Adrienne D'Ambricourt – The Humming Bird
- Kay Deslys – Tarnish
- W. C. Fields – Janice Meredith
- Barry Fitzgerald – Land of Her Fathers
- Clark Gable – White Man
- Janet Gaynor – Cupid's Rustler
- John Gielgud – Who Is the Man?
- Marie Glory – Paris
- Johannes Heesters – Cirque hollandais
- Olin Howland – The Great White Way
- Ian Hunter – Not for Sale
- Leila Hyams – Sandra
- Brian Keith – Pied Piper Malone
- Ian Keith – Manhandled
- Robert Keith – The Other Kind of Love
- Rex Lease – A Woman Who Sinned
- Robert McWade – Second Youth
- Lois Moran – La Galerie des monstres
- Grete Mosheim – Michael
- Rafaela Ottiano – The Law and the Lady
- Nat Pendleton – The Hoosier Schoolmaster
- Jane Pierson – Mandrin
- Michel Simon – La Galerie des monstres
- Camilla Spira – Mutter und Sohn
- Tom Tyler – Three Weeks
- Ellinor Vanderveer – Married Flirts
- Pierre Watkin – He Who Gets Slapped
- Florence Wix – Secrets
