= Claude Mérelle =

French actress (1888–1976)

- Claude Mérelle in a still from the 1921 film serial Les Trois Mousquetaires.
- Born: Lise Henriette Marie Laurent; 17 May 1888; Colombes, Hauts-de-Seine, France
- Died: 16 December 1976 (aged 88); Nice, Alpes-Maritimes, France
- Other name: Lise Laurent
- Occupation: Actress
- Years active: 1912–1928
- Spouse: Albert Decoeur (m. 1923; died 1942)

Claude Mérelle (born Lise Henriette Marie Laurent; 17 May 1888 – 16 December 1976) was a French stage and film actress who appeared in numerous films during the silent film era of the early 1910s through the late 1920s.

== Career ==
Claude Mérelle was born Lise Henriette Marie Laurent in Colombes, France in 1888, she made her film debut in the 1912 short Les noces siciliennes, directed by Louis Feuillade. She would go on to appear in numerous film serials throughout the 1910s under the name Lise Laurent and directed by filmmakers such as Feuillade, Henri Pouctal and Henri Diamant-Berger before using the stage name Claude Mérelle beginning in 1918. Mérelle most often appeared in film serials throughout her career, such as 1924's Les aventures de Robinson Crusoé, directed by Gaston Leprieur; 1924's Les amours de Rocambole, directed by Charles Maudru; 1925's Jean Chouans, directed by Luitz-Morat; 1926's Le capitaine Rascasse, Henri Desfontaines and 1926's Le juif errant, directed by Luitz-Morat. Her final film appearance was in the 1928 drama Rapa-Nui (also known as The Golden Abyss) directed by Mario Bonnard and starring André Roanne.

== Personal life ==
Claude Mérelle was married to stage and film actor Albert Decoeur from 1923 until his death in 1942. The two had appeared in several films together. She retired from films in 1928 and died in Nice in 1976 at age 88.

== Selected filmography ==
Year	Title	Role	Notes
1912	Les Noces siciliennes		
1914	La Bouquetière des Catalans		
1914	La Petite Réfugiée		
1914	Les Fiancées de 1914		
1914	L'Union sacrée		
1914	Le Roman de Midinette		
1915	Debout les morts		
1915	Pêcheur d'Islande		
1915	L'Angoisse au foyer		
1915	Celui qui reste	Madame d'Arbelle	
1915	Le Collier de perles		
1915	Le Colonel Bontemps	Madame de Lestranges	
1915	Deux françaises		
1915	Fifi tambour		
1915'	L'Autre devoir		
1915	Union sacrée	The Wife	
1915	L'escapade de Filoche		
1915	Le fer à cheval		
1916	Le Rêve d'Yvonne		
1916	Chantecoq ou L'Espionne de Guillaume		
1916	Debout les morts!		
1916	La Confrontation		
1916	Le Mirage du cœur		
1916	Paris pendant la guerre		
1916	Fille d'Ève		
1916	Chantecoq		
1918	La Femme de Claude		
1919	La Croisade	Betty Isvalow	
1919	Au travail	Fernande Delaveau	serial
1920	Les Mystères du ciel	Cléopâtre	
1921	Les Aventures de Robinson Crusoé	Magda	
1921	Les Trois Mousquetaires	Milady de Winter	serial
1922	La Bouquetière des innocents	Léonora Caligaï / Margot, the flower seller	
1922	King of the Camargue	La Zingara	
1922	The Black Diamond	Fraülenetière	
1922	Notre Dame d'amour	Roselyne	
1922	Stella Lucente		
1923	L'Espionne	Countess Zicka	
1923	The Little Thing	Irma Borel	
1923	Le bossu		
1923	Les Premières Armes de Rocambole	Baccara	
1924	The Loves of Rocambole	Baccara	
1924	Jocaste	Jocaste	
1924	Le Vert galant	Duchess of Montpensier	serial
1925	Jean Chouan	Maryse Fleurus	serial
1925	Milord l'Arsouille	Lady Seymour	serial
1926	Le Juif errant	Baroness of Saint-Dizier	
1926	Captain Rascasse	Madelon, the "Queen of Whisky"	serial
1927	The Golden Abyss	Dolores Coreto	(final film role)
