= Thomy Bourdelle =

French actor (1891–1972)

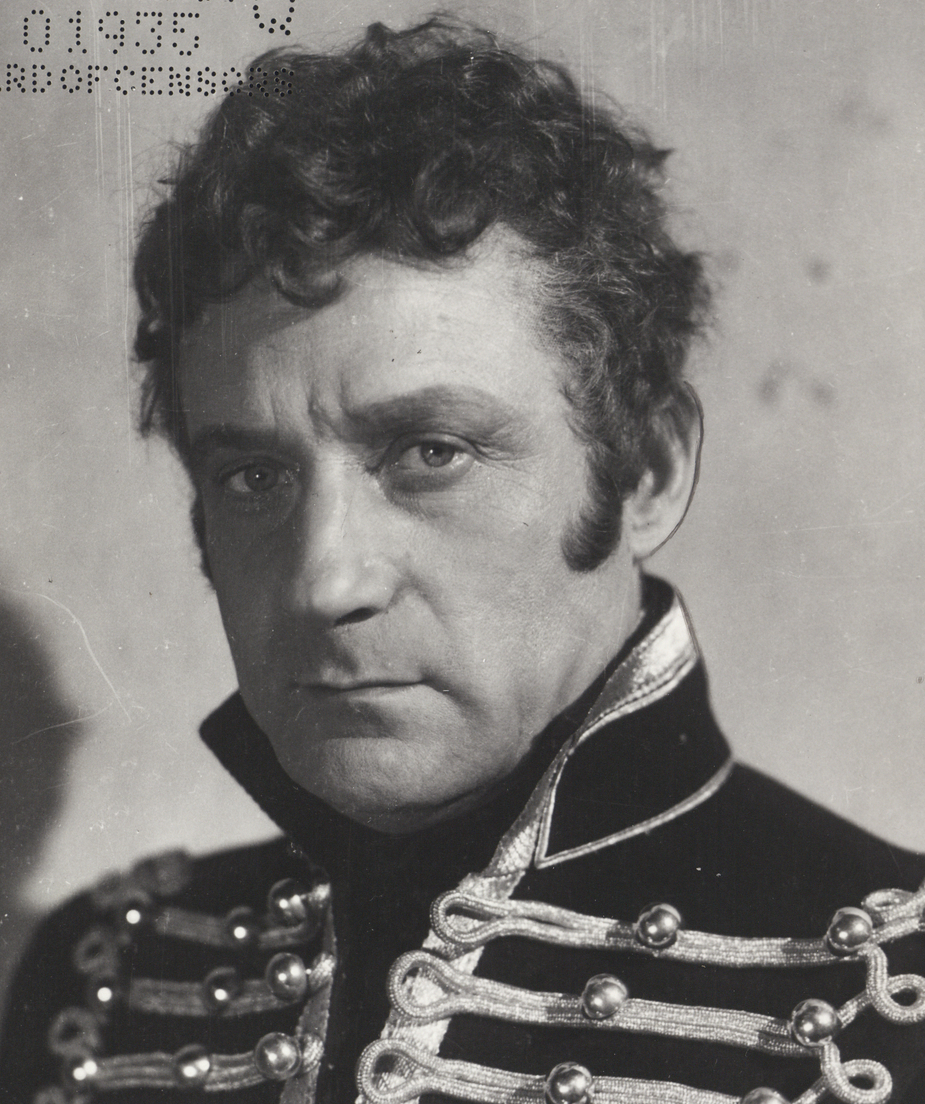
- Born: Thomy Charles Bourdelle; 20 April 1891; Paris, France
- Died: 27 June 1972 (aged 81); Toulon, France
- Occupation: Actor
- Years active: 1922–1958

Thomy Charles Bourdelle (20 April 1891 – 27 June 1972) was a French actor.

Bourdelle was born in Paris and died in Toulon, Var, France.

== Selected filmography ==
- Roger la Honte (1922)
- The Red Inn (1923)
- Surcouf (1925)
- Jack (1925)
- Jocaste (1925)
- Jean Chouan (1926)
- The Martyrdom of Saint Maxence (1928)
- Verdun: Visions of History (1928)
- Yvette (1928)
- The Divine Voyage (1929)
- Under the Roofs of Paris (1930)
- The Rebel (1931)
- The Devil's Holiday (1931)
- Danton (1932)
- Fifty Fathoms Deep (1932)
- Transit Camp (1932)
- Fantômas (1932)
- Tumultes (1932)
- The Three Musketeers (1932)
- Le testament du Dr. Mabuse (1933)
- Goodbye, Beautiful Days (1933)
- The Star of Valencia (1933)
- Bastille Day (1933)
- The House on the Dune (1934)
- The Man with a Broken Ear (1934)
- Maria Chapdelaine (1934)
- The Call of Silence (1936)
- When Midnight Strikes (1936)
- Seven Sinners (1936)
- Arsene Lupin, Detective (1937)
- The Men Without Names (1937)
- Sisters in Arms (1937)
- Chéri-Bibi (1938)
- Adrienne Lecouvreur (1938)
- Brazza ou l'épopée du Congo (1940)
- Jeannou (1943)
- The Black Cavalier (1945)
- A Cop (1947)
- Vendetta in Camargue (1950)
- Captain Ardant (1951)
- Grand Gala (1952)
- Alarm in Morocco (1953)
- Double or Quits (1953)
- The Return of Don Camillo (1953)
- Tabor (1954)
- Le rouge est mis (1957)
- Head Against the Wall (1958)

== Bibliography ==
- Powrie, Phil & Rebillard, Éric. Pierre Batcheff and stardom in 1920s French cinema. Edinburgh University Press, 2009
- Kalat, David. The Strange Case of Dr. Mabuse: A Study of the Twelve Films and Five Novels. McFarland, 2005.
