= Roger Lion =

French film director and screenwriter (1882–1934)

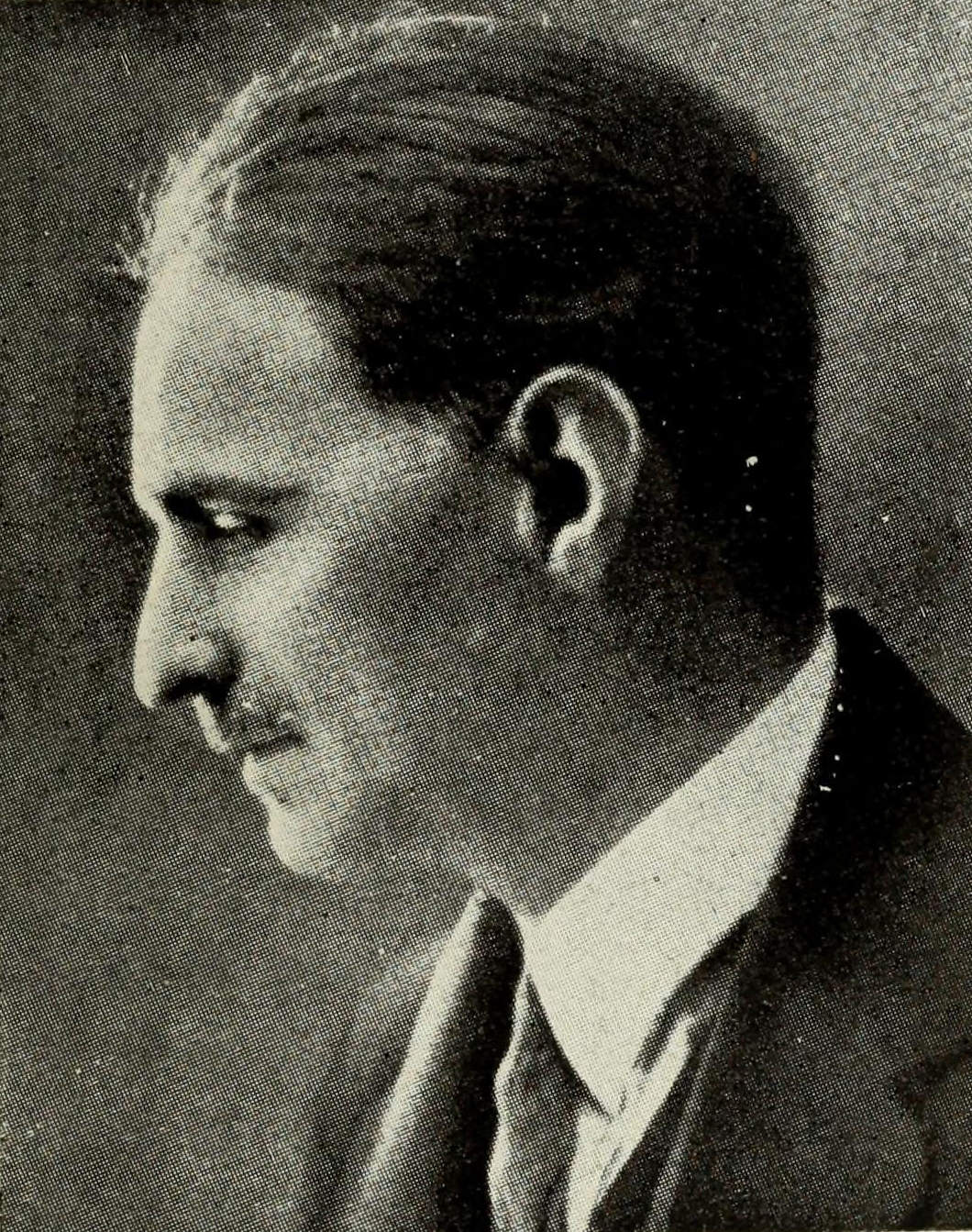
- Roger Lion
- Born: 27 September 1882; Troyes
- Died: 27 October 1934 (aged 52); Paris
- Occupations: Film director, screenwriter
- Years active: 1912 - 1933

Roger Lion (27 September 1882 – 27 October 1934) was a French film director and screenwriter.

== Filmography ==
- 1912 : L'Agence Cacahouète
- 1914 : La Petite Bretonne
- 1915 : À qui la femme?
- 1916 : Sacré Joseph
- 1916 : L'Enlèvement de Vénus
- 1916 : Dranem amoureux de Cléopâtre
- 1916 : Français!... N'oubliez jamais!
- 1916 : Erreur judiciaire
- 1916 : Les Deux Gifles
- 1917 : Quand Madelon
- 1917 : Ma femme est folle
- 1917 : Le Prince Plouf
- 1918 : Pour faire plaisir
- 1918 : La Flamme cachée
- 1919 : Dagobert le fils à son père
- 1921 : L'Éternel féminin
- 1923 : A Sereia de Pedra
- 1923 : Les Yeux de l'âme (Os Olhos da Alma)
- 1924 : La Fontaine des amours
- 1924 : Aventuras de Agapito
- 1924 : I Have Killed
- 1925 : La Clé de voûte
- 1926 : Jim la houlette, roi des voleurs
- 1926 : Les Fiançailles rouges
- 1927 : The Porter from Maxim's (1927)
- 1928 : La Venenosa
- 1929 : Un soir au cocktail's bar
- 1929 : L'Appel de la chair
- 1929 : Amour de louve
- 1930 : Messaoud Habib
- 1930 : Marius à Paris
- 1930 : La Raïs
- 1930 : La place est bonne!
- 1930 : La Fille de Roland
- 1930 : Grégor et ses Grégoriens (short film starring Grégor et ses Grégoriens)
- 1930 : Eau, gaz et amour à tous les étages (short film)
- 1930 : La nuit est à nous
- 1931 : Y'en a pas deux comme Angélique
- 1931 : Le Lit conjugal (short film)
- 1931 : Allô... Allô... (short film)
- 1932 : Ghanili Dour (short film)
- 1932 : Direct au cœur
- 1933 : Trois Balles dans la peau
- 1933 : Le Couché de la mariée
