= Maurice Schutz =

French actor (1866–1955)

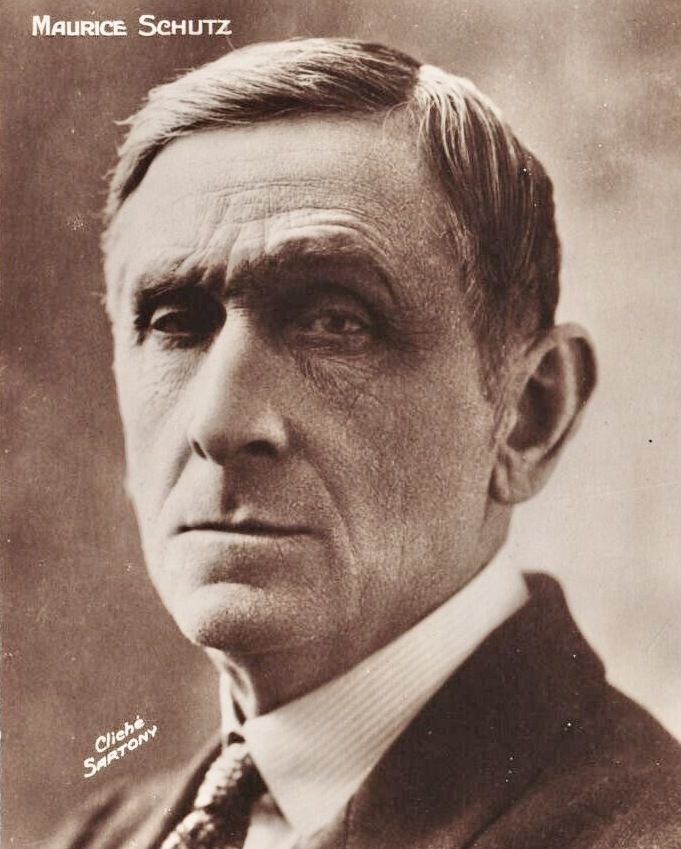
- Schutz c. 1920
- Born: Paul Maurice Schutzenberger; 4 August 1866; Paris, France
- Died: 22 March 1955 (aged 88); Clichy-la-Garenne, France
- Occupation: actor
- Years active: 1918–1952

Maurice Schutz (4 August 1866 – 22 March 1955) was a French film actor.

He starred in some 91 films between 1918 and 1952.

== Selected filmography ==
- Quatre-vingt-treize (1920)
- Au-delà des lois humaines (1920)
- The Three Masks (1921)
- Tillers of the Soil (1923)
- Little Jacques (1923)
- The Phantom of the Moulin Rouge (1925)
- Montmartre (1925)
- Jean Chouan (1926)
- The Imaginary Voyage (1926)
- Napoléon (1927)
- The Passion of Joan of Arc (1928)
- Verdun: Visions of History (1928)
- Venus (1929)
- A Foolish Maiden (1929)
- The Devil's Holiday (1931)
- Vampyr (1932)
- Fantômas (1932)
- Pasteur (1935)
- The Call of Silence (1936)
- The Assault (1936)
- Three Waltzes (1938)
- Gargousse (1938)
- The Novel of Werther (1938)
- La Symphonie fantastique (1942)
- Jeannou (1943)
- The Great Pack (1945)
- The Captain (1946)
- The Murderer is Not Guilty (1946)
- The Village of Wrath (1947)
- Coincidences (1947)
- The Lost Village (1947)
- Danger of Death (1947)
- The Lame Devil (1948, Le Diable boiteux)
- Return to Life (1949)
- Miquette (1950)
- Adémaï au poteau-frontière (1950)
- Extravagant Theodora (1950)
- Véronique (1950)
- Boîte à vendre (1951)
- Good Enough to Eat (1951)
