= Denise Legeay =

French actress (1898–1968)

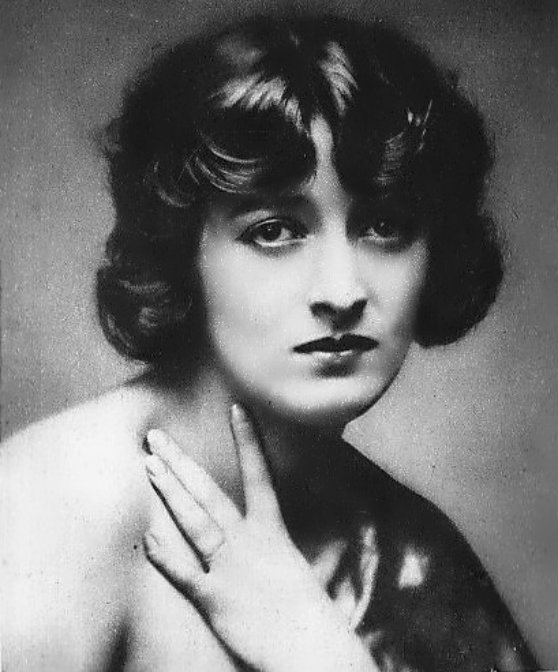
- Born: 22 January 1898; Courdemanche, Sarthe, French Third Republic
- Died: 27 May 1968 (aged 70); Paris, France
- Occupation: Actress
- Years active: 1921–1926

Denise Augusta Marguerite Legeay (22 January 1898 – 27 May 1968) was a French film actress whose popularity peaked during the silent film era of the 1920s.

Legeay made her film debut at age 23 in the 1921 Henry Houry directed film L’infante à la rose and would continue to act in films until 1926, including a ten episode film serial Vingt ans après in 1922.

== Selected filmography ==
- Happy Couple (1923)
- The Man Without Nerves (1924)
- That Scoundrel Morin (1924)
- I Have Killed (1924)
- Swifter Than Death (1925)
- Zigano (1925)
- Eyes Open, Harry! (1926)
