= Maurice Mariaud =

- Born: 1875; Marseille, France
- Died: 1958 (aged 82–83); France
- Occupation(s): Film director, silent actor, screenwriter

Maurice Mariaud (1875–1958) was a French silent film director, actor and screenwriter.

He was best known for his silent films of the 1910s and his work overlapping with Portuguese film in the early 1920s, notably the 1922 Portuguese film Os Faroleiros.

== Selected filmography ==
- The Crushed Idol (1920)
- Jean Chouan (1926)
