= Henri Baudin =

French actor

- Born: 11 March 1882; Lyon, France
- Died: 2 October 1953 (aged 71); Vienne-en-Arthies, France
- Occupation: Actor
- Years active: 1916–1935 (film)

Henri Baudin (11 March 1882 – 2 October 1953) was a French stage and film actor of the silent era.

== Selected filmography ==
- The Crushed Idol (1920)
- Les Trois Mousquetaires (1921)
- Sarati the Terrible (1923)
- The Bread Peddler (1923)
- Little Jacques (1923)
- The Thruster (1924)
- Terror (1924)
- The Woman in Gold (1926)
- The Good Reputation (1926)
- Cousin Bette (1928)
- Pawns of Passion (1928)
- Sowing the Wind (1929)
- The Waltz King (1930)
- The Three Musketeers (1932)

== Bibliography ==
- Goble, Alan. The Complete Index to Literary Sources in Film. Walter de Gruyter, 1999.
