= Swifter Than Death =

1925 film by Gérard Bourgeois and Harry Piel

- Directed by: Harry Piel; Gérard Bourgeois
- Written by: Gérard Bourgeois; Edmund Heuberger; Herbert Nossen; Harry Piel
- Starring: Harry Piel; Dary Holm; Denise Legeay; José Davert
- Cinematography: Georg Muschner; Gotthardt Wolf
- Production companies: Hape-Film; Gaumont
- Release date: 11 April 1925
- Running time: 97 minutes
- Countries: France; Germany
- Languages: Silent; German intertitles

Swifter Than Death (German: Schneller als der Tod, French: Face à la mort) is a 1925 French-German silent action film directed by Gérard Bourgeois and Harry Piel and starring Piel, Dary Holm, Denise Legeay and José Davert. It was shot at the Cité Elgé Studios in Paris and on location in Munich and the Côte d'Azur. The film's sets were designed by the art director Fritz Kraenke .

== Cast ==
- Harry Piel as Harry Piel
- Denise Legeay as Lizzie
- José Davert as Jack Brown
- Fred Berger as Éric Holsen
- Dary Holm as Christensen
- Marguerite Madys as Yvette Riccoldi
- Paul Guidé as Le duc de Frontignac
- Albert Paulig as L'éditeur Riccoldi

== Bibliography ==
- Elsaesser, Thomas & Wedel, Michael. The BFI companion to German cinema. British Film Institute, 1999.
