= Louis Kerly =

French actor (1872–1936)

- Born: 18 June 1872; Pontoise, Seine-et-Oise, France
- Died: 23 November 1936 (aged 64); Paris, France
- Occupation: Actor
- Years active: 1920-1936 (film)

Louis Kerly (18 June 1872 – 23 November 1936) was a French stage and film actor.

== Selected filmography ==
- In Old Alsace (1920)
- The Bread Peddler (1923)
- The Two Boys (1924)
- Monte Carlo (1925)
- My Priest Among the Rich (1925)
- My Priest Among the Poor (1926)
- The Divine Voyage (1929)
- The Devil's Holiday (1931)
- Black and White (1931)
- I'll Be Alone After Midnight (1931)
- Bouboule's Gang (1931)
- The Darling of His Concierge (1934)
- Tartarin of Tarascon (1934)
- Les Misérables (1934)
- The New Testament (1936)
- Let's Make a Dream (1936)

== Bibliography ==
- Goble, Alan. The Complete Index to Literary Sources in Film. Walter de Gruyter, 1999.
