= Verdun: Visions of History =

1928 film

- Directed by: Léon Poirier
- Written by: Léon Poirier
- Cinematography: Georges Million
- Music by: André Petiot
- Release date: 8 November 1928
- Running time: 151 minutes
- Country: France
- Language: French

Verdun: Visions of History (French: Verdun, visions d'histoire) is a 1928 French docudrama film directed by Léon Poirier. It portrays the battle of Verdun, primarily by recreating the battle on its location, but also with the use of newsreel footage and dramatic scenes. Most of the people in the film are actual French and German World War I veterans, including Marshal Philippe Pétain who portrays himself. The film has a pacifist message.

== Cast ==
- Albert Préjean as the French soldier
- Jeanne Marie-Laurent as the mother
- Suzanne Bianchetti as the wife
- Hans Brausewetter as the German soldier
- Thomy Bourdelle as the German officer
- Pierre Nay as the boy
- Maurice Schutz as the Marshal of the empire
- Antonin Artaud as the intellectual
- Daniel Mendaille as the husband
- Philippe Pétain as Philippe Pétain

Other than Pétain, the film pays tribute to the officers Robert Nivelle, Charles Mangin, Ferdinand Foch and Georges Guynemer.

== Release ==
The film premiered on 8 November 1928 with a screening at the Palais Garnier, in the presence of the French president and the German ambassador, with an original orchestra score by André Petiot. It was released in regular cinemas on 23 November 1928. In 1931, Poirier re-edited the film and added an audio track to create a sound film, which was released under the title Verdun, souvenirs d'histoire ("memories of history"). The sound version runs at 115 minutes, while the original silent version is 151 minutes long. Most prints of the film were destroyed during World War II. A good print was discovered in Moscow 50 years later and was restored by the Cinémathèque de Toulouse in 2006.
