= Camille Bert =

French actor (1880–1970)

Camille Bert (1880–1970) was a French actor.

Born Camille Léon Louis Bertrand in Orléans, he died in Paris in 1970.

== Selected filmography ==
- Le secret de Rosette Lambert (1920)
- The Thruster (1924)
- The Vocation of André Carel (1925)
- Princess Lulu (1925)
- The Lady of Lebanon (1926)
- The Temple of Shadows (1927)
- Yasmina (1927)
- The Crew (1928)
- Tarakanova (1930)
- Accused, Stand Up! (1930)
- David Golder (1931)
- Maurin of the Moors (1932)
- My Priest Among the Rich (1932)
- The Illustrious Maurin (1933)
- The Little King (1933)
- Number 33 (1933)
- The Two Orphans (1933)
- Sapho (1934)
- The Rosary (1934)
- Itto (1934)
- Bux the Clown (1935)
- Tovaritch (1935)
- The Imberger Mystery (1935)
- Maria of the Night (1936)
- Michel Strogoff (1936)
- The Tender Enemy (1936)
- Wolves Between Them (1936)
- The Lower Depths (1936)
- Yoshiwara (1937)
- Madelon's Daughter (1937)
- Monsieur Bégonia (1937)
- Sisters in Arms (1937)
- Tamara (1938)
- Champions of France (1938)
- The City of Lights (1938)
- Peace on the Rhine (1938)
- Heroes of the Marne (1938)
- Thérèse Martin (1939)
- The Spirit of Sidi-Brahim (1939)
- Miss Bonaparte (1942)
- The Blue Veil (1942)
- Mermoz (1943)
- The Midnight Sun (1943)
- Special Mission (1946)
- Naughty Martine (1947)

== Bibliography ==
- Oscherwitz, Dayna & Higgins, MaryEllen. The A to Z of French Cinema. Scarecrow Press, 2009.
- Powrie, Phil & Rebillard, Éric. Pierre Batcheff and stardom in 1920s French cinema. Edinburgh University Press, 2009
