= Nicolas Rimsky =

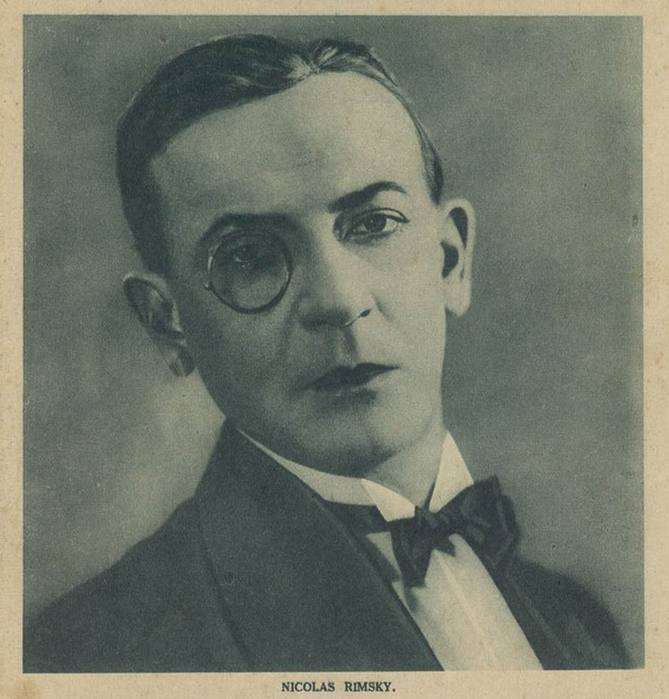
- Nicolas Rimsky on cover of Mon Ciné
- Born: Nikolai Alexandrovich Kurmashov; 18 February 1886; Moscow, Russia
- Died: 5 September 1941 (aged 55); Marseille, France
- Other names: Nicolai Rimsky; Nikolai Rimsky; Rimsky
- Years active: 1916–1940

Nicolas Rimsky (Russian: Николай Алекса́ндрович Римский; born Nikolai Alexandrovich Kurmashov; 18 February 1886 – 5 September 1941) was a Russian-French film actor, director and writer. He was born in Moscow, Russia. In 1931, he directed and starred in Pas sur la bouche (Not on the Mouth), based on an operetta by André Barde.

In The Happy Death (L'heureuse mort, 1924, with a screenplay by Rimsky from the story by Countess Baillehache) he plays an unsuccessful and unpleasant playwright who suddenly becomes much more successful when he is believed drowned (and also plays his brother who turns up for the funeral). Linda Williams, who calls Rimsky a "great comedian", praises his performance as "a gem of comic timing". Leonard Maltin said the film's "cynical take on the nature of celebrity makes it seem quite modern".

He also starred in comedy Because I Love You (Parce Que Je T'Aime, 1929) as a professor who marries his secretary then loses her affections to his godson.

== Selected filmography ==
- Father Sergius (1918)
- That Scoundrel Morin (1924)
- The Masked Woman (1924)
- Paris in Five Days (1926)
- The Porter from Maxim's (1927)
- Immorality (1928)
- Cagliostro (1929)
- The Patriot (1938)
- Threats (1940)
