= Louis Aubert (producer) =

French film producer and politician

- Born: 27 August 1878; Mayenne, France
- Died: 17 May 1944 (aged 65); Les Sables-d'Olonne, Vendée, France
- Occupations: Producer, Distributor, Politician

Louis Aubert (1878–1944) was a French film producer, distributor and exhibitor. A pioneer in the early silent era, in 1909 he established the distribution company Compagnie Générale du Cinématographe and in 1913 founded Etablissements Louis Aubert. He also owned a chain of Aubert Palaces cinemas. He sold his film interests to the large Gaumont concern, but continued to produce individual films. He later entered politics, and was elected, as a deputy for Sables-d'Olonne in 1932 and again in 1936. An Independent Radical he voted in 1940 to award supreme power to Philippe Pétain during the Fall of France.

== Selected filmography ==
- L'Atlantide (1921)
- Sarati the Terrible (1923)
- Princess Lulu (1925)
- My Priest Among the Rich (1925)
- Simone (1926)
- My Priest Among the Poor (1926)
- Siren of the Tropics (1927)
- Nile Water (1928)
- The New Testament (1936)

== Bibliography ==
- Crisp, C.G. The Classic French Cinema, 1930–1960. Indiana University Press, 1993.
- O'Brien, Charles. Cinema's Conversion to Sound: Technology and Film Style in France and the U.S.. Indiana University Press, 2005.
- Ulff-Møller, Jens. Hollywood's Film Wars with France: Film-trade Diplomacy and the Emergence of the French Film Quota Policy. University Rochester Press, 2001.
