= Lucienne Legrand (silent film actress) =

French actress (1900–1987)

- Born: 5 May 1900; Saint-Cloud, Hauts-de-Seine, France
- Died: 22 October 1987 (aged 87); Cannes, Alpes-Maritimes, France
- Occupation: Actress
- Years active: 1921–1929 (film)

Lucienne Legrand (5 May 1900 – 22 October 1987) was a French film actress of the silent era. She frequently worked with her husband the actor and director Émile-Bernard Donatien. She should not be confused with the later actress Lucienne Legrand (1920–2022).

== Selected filmography ==
- Happy Couple (1923)
- Princess Lulu (1925)
- My Priest Among the Rich (1925)
- Simone (1926)
- My Priest Among the Poor (1926)
- The Martyrdom of Saint Maxence (1928)

== Bibliography ==
- Rège, Philippe. Encyclopedia of French Film Directors, Volume 1. Scarecrow Press, 2009.
