= The Princess and the Clown =

1924 film

- Directed by: André Hugon
- Written by: Jean-José Frappa; Mary Murillo
- Starring: Huguette Duflos; Charles de Rochefort; Magda Roche
- Cinematography: Amédée Morrin; Romain Parguel; Maurice Velle
- Production company: Gaumont-Franco Film-Aubert
- Release date: 23 October 1924
- Country: France
- Languages: Silent; French intertitles

The Princess and the Clown (French:La princesse aux clowns) is a 1924 French silent film directed by André Hugon and starring Huguette Duflos, Charles de Rochefort and Magda Roche.

== Cast ==
- Huguette Duflos as Princess Olga
- Charles de Rochefort as The Clown
- Magda Roche
- Guy Favières as King Michel II
- Paul Franceschi

== Bibliography ==
- Rège, Philippe. Encyclopedia of French Film Directors, Volume 1. Scarecrow Press, 2009.
