= Huguette Duflos =

French actress (1887–1982)

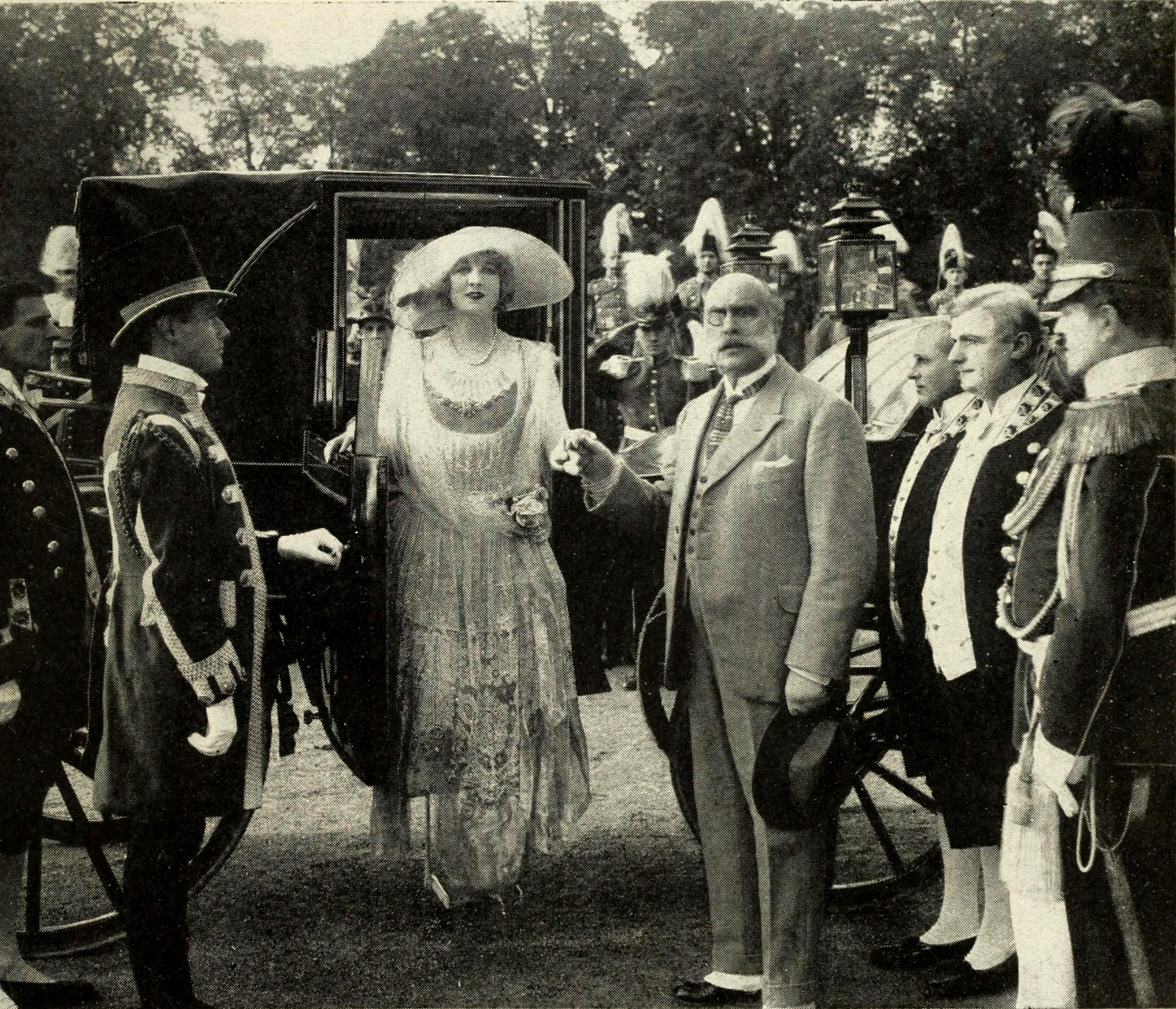
Duflos in Koenigsmark (1923).

Huguette Duflos (24 August 1887, Limoges – 12 April 1982, Paris) was a French stage and film actress.

== Life ==
In 1910, she married the actor Raphaël Duflos, from whom she was divorced around 1928. Initially a theatrical performer with the Comédie-Française, Duflor then embarked on a film career.

In 1931, Duflos was attacked by Frenchwoman Marguerite Pantaine outside the Theatre St. Georges in Paris. Pantaine was later treated by Jacques Lacan and became the subject of his doctoral thesis.

== Selected filmography ==
- The Assassination of the Duke of Guise (1908)
- In Old Alsace (1920)
- The Flower of the Indies (1921)
- Koenigsmark (1923)
- The Mysteries of Paris (1924)
- The Princess and the Clown (1924)
- I Have Killed (1924)
- The Man with the Hispano (1926)
- Der Rosenkavalier (1926)
- Yasmina (1927)
- Palaces (1927)
- Le procès de Mary Dugan (1930)
- The Mystery of the Yellow Room (1930)
- The Perfume of the Lady in Black (1931)
- Martha (1936)
- Maman Colibri (1937)
- The Train for Venice (1938)
- Troubled Heart (1938)
- The Law of Spring (1942)
- Christine Gets Married (1946)
- The Captain (1946)
- Twelve Hours of Happiness (1952)
- Girl on the Road (1962)

== Bibliography ==
- Jung, Uli; Schatzberg, Walter (1999). Beyond Caligari: The Films of Robert Wiene. New York: Berghahn Books. ISBN 978-1-57181-196-7.
