= Max Maxudian =

French actor

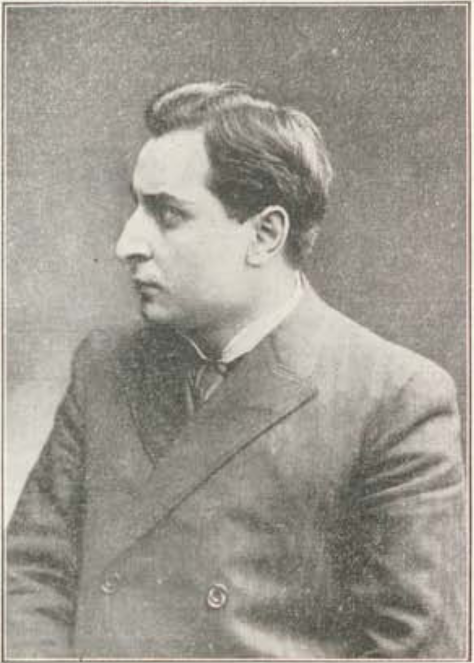
- Max Maxudian
- Born: 12 June 1881; Smyrna, Ottoman Empire
- Died: 20 July 1976 (aged 95); Boulogne-Billancourt; France
- Other name: Max Algop Maxudian
- Occupation: Film actor
- Years active: 1912 - 1950

Max Algop Maxudian (12 June 1881 – 20 July 1976) was a French stage and film actor.

Born in the Ottoman Empire to an Armenian family, Max Maxudian emigrated to France with his parents in 1893 at the age of twelve. Maxudian became a famous theater actor in his adopted country, appearing at the Odéon and at the Grand Guignol. He died at age 95 in 1976 in Boulogne-Billancourt, Hauts-de-Seine, France.

== Selected filmography ==
- Les Amours de la reine Élisabeth (1912)
- Infatuation (1918)
- Possession (1922)
- The Gardens of Murcia (1923)
- La Roue (1923)
- I Have Killed (1924)
- The Loves of Rocambole (1924)
- The Arab (1924)
- The Promised Land (1925)
- Napoléon (1927)
- Nile Water (1928)
- Venus (1929)
- La Maison de la Fléche (1930)
- Venetian Nights (1931)
- The Foreigner (1931)
- Shadows of Paris (1932)
- The Faceless Voice (1933)
- Les yeux noirs (1935)
- Bourrasque (1935)
- Bux the Clown (1935)
- The Decoy (1935)
- The Two Girls (1936)
- Wells in Flames (1937)
- White Cargo (1937)
- Three Waltzes (1938)
- Devil in the Flesh (1947)
- Memories Are Not for Sale (1948)
- Death Threat (1950)

== Bibliography ==
- Jung, Uli & Schatzberg, Walter. Beyond Caligari: The Films of Robert Wiene. Berghahn Books, 1999.
