= Léon Poirier =

French film producer, screenwriter and director (1884–1968)

- Born: 25 August 1884; Paris, France
- Died: 27 June 1968 (aged 83); Urval, Dordogne, France
- Occupations: Film director, screenwriter
- Years active: 1913—49

Léon Poirier (25 August 1884 – 27 June 1968) was a French film director, screenwriter and film producer best known for his silent films from 1913 onwards. He directed some 25 films between 1913 and 1949. His most famous film today is Verdun: Visions of History, a drama-documentary depicting the World War I Battle of Verdun. His later films adopted a form of poetic realism influenced by pictorialist photography.

== Life ==
Poirier was the nephew of Berthe Morisot. He began his career in the theatre, as secretary of the Théâtre du Gymnase. Following a serious accident, he withdrew from theatrical productions and accepted a contract from Gaumont to make a film. In 1914 with the outbreak of war, he joined the army and became a lieutenant in the artillery, even though his accident exempted him from duty.

At the end of the conflict he returned to filmmaking, creating a large number of films in the silent era, but reducing his output after the advent of sound. Most of these works adopted a form of pictorialist naturalism.

In 1928 Poirier completed Verdun: Visions of History, a dramatized documentary about the battle. The film was shot on site of the carnage. Poirier utilised, ten years after the conflict, the battlefield and the ruins of the forts of Vaux and Douaumont. The performers were French and German veterans and a few professional actors.

He directed his last film in 1947 and retired to Urval where he died in 1968.

== Filmography ==
- 1913: Cadette
- 1914: Le Trèfle d'argent
- 1914: Le Nid
- 1914: Ces demoiselles Perrotin
- 1914: L'Amour passe
- 1919: Âmes d'Orient
- 1920: Narayana
- 1920: Le Penseur
- 1921: L'Ombre déchirée
- 1921: Le Coffret de jade
- 1922: Jocelyn
- 1923: Geneviève
- 1923: The Courier of Lyon
- 1924: La Brière
- 1926: La Croisière noire
- 1928: La Croisière jaune
- 1928: Verdun: Visions of History (Verdun: Visions d'Histoire)
- 1930: Caïn, aventures des mers exotiques, co-directed by Emil-Edwin Reinert
- 1933: La Croisière jaune, co-directed by André Sauvage
- 1933: La Voie sans disque
- 1936: The Call of Silence
- 1937: Sisters in Arms
- 1940: Brazza ou l'épopée du Congo
- 1943: Jeannou
- 1949: La Route inconnue

== See also ==
- 1913 in film
