= Émile-Bernard Donatien =

- Born: 20 June 1887; Paris, France
- Died: 8 November 1955 (aged 68); Appoigny, France
- Occupations: Actor, writer, director
- Years active: 1919–1932 (film)

Émile-Bernard Donatien (20 June 1887 – 8 November 1955) was a French actor, writer, set designer and film director. Born Emile Wessbecher to Alsatian parents in Paris, he was often credited simply as Donatien. He retired from cinema in 1932, devoting himself to sculpting and painting. He was married to the actress Lucienne Legrand with whom he frequently worked.

== Selected filmography ==
- I Have Killed (1924)
- Princess Lulu (1925)
- Nantas (1925)
- My Priest Among the Rich (1925)
- Simone (1926)
- My Priest Among the Poor (1926)
- Florine, la fleur du Valois (1927)
- The Martyrdom of Saint Maxence (1928)
- Miss Edith, Duchess (1929)
- My Priest Among the Rich (1932)

== Bibliography ==
- Rège, Philippe. Encyclopedia of French Film Directors, Volume 1. Scarecrow Press, 2009.
