= Gérard Bourgeois =

French film director

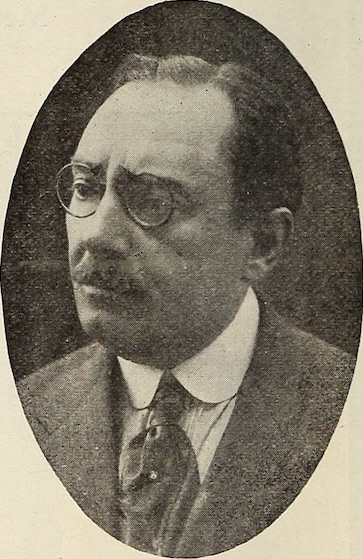
- Born: August 18, 1874
- Died: December 15, 1944 (aged 70)

Gérard Bourgeois (born August 18, 1874, in Geneva, Switzerland (from French parents), and died December 15, 1944, in Paris, France) was a leading French film director during the silent era.

After ten years in the theater, Gérard Bourgeois became artistic director of Lux-films. In 1911, he joined the company Pathé. He first filmed historical films (Cadoudal), then realistic films including the landmark 1911 film "Victimes de l'alcoolisme" (US: In The Grip of Alcohol), proclaimed by Moving Picture World as "The greatest moral dilemma ever made by any film manufacturer" In the Grip of Alcohol ), before founding his own production company with René Mathey, Les Films MB (Bourgeois-Mathey).

Bourgeois made 142 films between 1908 and 1925. He directed many of the popular Nick Winter comedy mysteries starring Georges Vinter in the early 1910s including 1911's "Nick Winter et le vol de la Joconde" about an attempt theft of the Mona LisaNick Winter and the Theft of the Mona Lisa (1911) A Silent Film Review. His 1916 feature "Christophe Colomb" a biography of Christopher Columbus is available for viewing online at YouTube. His other notable films include "Hamlet" (1910), "L'Aventurier" (1915), 1921 : "Un drame sous Napoléon (1921), "Faust" (1922) and "L'Homme sans nerfs" (1924).

He moved to Neuilly before 1914. At the beginning of World War I, he joined as a foreign volunteer with his son in the French army. He evacuated eight days after arriving at the front because of illness.

He is credited with several publishings on filmmaking he made with Pathé Freres in 1911.

== Selected filmography ==
- La Fille du Braconnier (1908)
- Hamlet (1910)
- Nick Winter et le vol de la Joconde (1911)
- L'Aventurier (1915)
- Christophe Colomb (1916)
- Un drame sous Napoléon (1921)
- Faust (1922)
- L'Homme sans nerfs (1924)
- Terror (1924)
- Swifter Than Death (1925)
- In the Face of Death (1925)
