= List of French films of 1927 =

French films released in 1927

A list of films produced in France in 1927:

Title	Director	Cast	Genre	Notes
André Cornélis	Jean Kemm	Georges Lannes, Claude France	Drama	
Captain Rascasse	Henri Desfontaines	Gabriel Gabrio, Jeanne Helbling	Adventure	
Celle qui domine	Léon Mathot and Carmine Gallone	Léon Mathot, André Volbert		
Chantage	Henri Debain	Huguette Duflos, Jean Angelo		
The Chocolate Girl	René Hervil	Dolly Davis, Simone Mareuil	Comedy	
Colette the Unwanted	René Barberis	Daniel Mendaille, Sandra Milovanoff	Silent	
Cousine de France	Gaston Roudès	France Dhélia		
Croquette	Louis Mercanton	Betty Balfour, Walter Byron	Silent	
The Crystal Submarine	Marcel Vandal	Anna Lefeuvrier, André Dubosc	Drama	
Dans l'ombre du harem	Léon Mathot and André Liabel	Léon Mathot, Louise Lagrange		
Destiny	Dimitri Kirsanoff	Nadia Sibirskaïa, Guy Belmont	Silent	
The Duel	Jacques de Baroncelli	Mady Christians, Jean Murat	Silent	
The Dying Land	Jean Choux	Gilbert Dalleu, Madeleine Renaud, Jean Dehelly	Drama	
Education of a Prince	Henri Diamant-Berger	Edna Purviance, Jean Dax	Comedy	
En Rade	Alberto Cavalcanti	Nathalie Lissenko, Philippe Hériat		
The Five Cents of Lavarede	Maurice Champreux	Georges Biscot, Anna Lefeuvrier	Adventure	
Fleur d'amour	Marcel Vandal		Comedy	
The Glass Boat	Constantin J. David	André Nox, Françoise Rosay	Silent	Co-production with Germany
L’île d'amour	Jean Durand, Berthe Dagmar	Claude France, Pierre Batcheff		
L'Invitation au voyage	Germaine Dulac		Silent	
L'Occident	Henri Fescourt			
La Cousine Bette	Max de Rieux			
La Glu	Henri Fescourt			
La Grande Envolee	René Plaissety		Historical	
La Grande Epreuve	Alexandre Ryder and André Dugès	Michèle Verly, Jean Murat		
La maison sans amour	Emilien Charpentier			
La petite marchande d'allumettes	Jean Renoir	Catherine Hessling	Drama	
La sirène des Tropiques	Henri Etiévant, Mario Nalpas	Josephine Baker, Pierre Batcheff	Romantic comedy	
La valse de l'adieu	Henry Roussell		Historical	
La Vestale du Gange	André Hugon	Camille Bert, Georges Melchior		
Le Baiser qui tue	Dr. T. Małachowski, Jean Choux	André Soral, Thérèse Reignier		
Le bonheur du jour	Gaston Ravel			
Le chauffeur de mademoiselle	Henri Chomette	Dolly Davis, Gaston Modot		
Le Cinéma au service de l'histoire				
Le manoir de la peur	Alfred Machin, Henri Wulschleger	Romuald Joubé, Arlette Marchal		
Le Mariage de mademoiselle Beulemans	Julien Duvivier			
Le mystère de la Tour Eiffel	Julien Duvivier	Félicien Tramel, Gaston Jacquet		
Le Passager	Jacques de Baroncelli	Charles Vanel, Michèle Verly		
The Porter from Maxim's	Nicolas Rimsky, Roger Lion	Nicolas Rimsky, Simone Vaudry	Comedy	
The Prey of the Wind (La proie du vent)	René Clair	Charles Vanel, Sandra Milovanoff	Drama	
Le prince Jean	René Hervil			
Le sous-marin de cristal	Marcel Vandal	Félicien Tramel, Anna Lefeuvrier		
Le Train de 8H 47	Georges Pallu			
Le Vertige	Marcel L'Herbier	Emmy Lynn, Jaque Catelain		
Les cœurs héroïques	Georges Pallu			
Les transatlantiques	Pierre Colombier			
Madame Récamier	Gaston Ravel	Marie Bell, Françoise Rosay	Historical	
The Maid at the Palace	Louis Mercanton	Betty Balfour, André Roanne	Comedy	
Marquitta	Jean Renoir	Marie-Louise Iribe, Jean Angelo	Drama	
Martyr	Charles Burguet	Charles Vanel, Suzy Vernon, Jean Angelo	Drama	
Minuit, place Pigalle	René Hervil	Renée Héribel, Nicolas Rimsky	Drama	
Muche	Robert Péguy	Nicolas Koline, Elmire Vautier, Madeleine Guitty	Comedy drama	
Napoléon	Abel Gance	Albert Dieudonné	Biography / War	3 wins (1981)
Palaces	Jean Durand	Léon Bary, Huguette Duflos	Silent	
Pardonnée	Jean Cassagne		Comedy drama	
Poker d'as	Henri Desfontaines			
Princess Masha	René Leprince	Jean Toulout, Romuald Joubé	Drama	
Sables	Dimitri Kirsanoff	Colette Darfeuil, Gina Manès	Drama	
Six et demi, onze	Jean Epstein	Suzy Pierson, Edmond Van Daële	Drama	
Sur un air de Charleston	Jean Renoir	Catherine Hessling, Johnny Huggins	SF	
The Three-Sided Mirror (La Glace à trois faces)	Jean Epstein	Jeanne Helbling	Drama	
Une java	Jean de Size			
The Woman from the Folies Bergères	Max Obal	Claire Rommer, Carl Auen, Josephine Baker	Silent	Co-production with Germany
Yasmina	André Hugon	Camille Bert, Huguette Duflos		
Yvette	Alberto Cavalcanti	Catherine Hessling, Walter Byron	Drama	

== See also ==
- 1927 in France
