= Jean Renoir filmography =

Jean Renoir (15 September 1894 – 12 February 1979) was a French filmmaker and writer. He started out in French silent cinema before he established himself in the 1930s as one of the major exponents of poetic realism. During World War II he moved to the United States, where he made a few American films before he returned to European cinema in the 1950s.

== Filmography ==
Renoir was involved in making the following films.

=== Director ===
Year	Original title	English title	Notes
1925	La fille de l'eau	The Whirlpool of Fate	
1926	Nana		
1927	Sur un air de Charleston	Charleston Parade	
1927	Marquitta		presumed lost
1927	Catherine ou Une vie sans joie	Backbiters	co-directed with Albert Dieudonné in 1924, re-edited and released in 1927
1928	La petite marchande d'allumettes	The Little Match Girl	
1928	Tire-au-flanc	The Sad Sack	
1928	Le tournoi dans la cité	The Tournament	
1929	Le Bled		final silent film
1931	On purge bébé		first sound film
1931	La Chienne	The Bitch	
1932	La nuit de carrefour	Night at the Crossroads	
1932	Boudu sauvé des eaux	Boudu Saved from Drowning	
1933	Chotard et cie	Chotard and Company	
1934	Madame Bovary		
1935	Toni		
1936	Le crime de Monsieur Lange	The Crime of Monsieur Lange	
1936	Les Bas-fonds	The Lower Depths	
1937	La grande illusion	Grand Illusion	
1938	La Marseillaise		
1938	La bête humaine		
1939	La règle du jeu	The Rules of the Game	
1941	Swamp Water		first American film
1943	This Land Is Mine		
1945	The Southerner		
1945	Salute to France		documentary
1946	The Diary of a Chambermaid		
1946	Partie de campagne	A Day in the Country	shot in 1936
1947	The Woman on the Beach		
1951	The River		final American film
1952	Le carrosse d'or	The Golden Coach	
1955	French Cancan		
1956	Elena et les hommes	Elena and Her Men	
1959	Le Testament du docteur Cordelier	The Doctor's Horrible Experiment	
1959	Le déjeuner sur l'herbe	Picnic on the Grass	
1962	Le caporal épinglé	The Elusive Corporal	
1962	"La scampagnata"	"The Picnic"	Segment in Il fiore e la violenza (The Flower and the Violence)
1970	Le petit théâtre de Jean Renoir	The Little Theatre of Jean Renoir	

=== Other credits ===
- 1936: La vie est à nous (Life Belongs to Us, as leader of collective of directors, also acted)
- 1940: L'or du Cristobal (Cristobal's Gold, dialogue)
