= La plus belle fille du monde =

La plus belle fille du monde may refer to:

- The Most Beautiful Girl in the World (1938 film), a French comedy film
- The Most Beautiful Girl in the World (1951 film), a French comedy film
