= Johnny Hudgins =

American vaudeville performer (1896-1990)

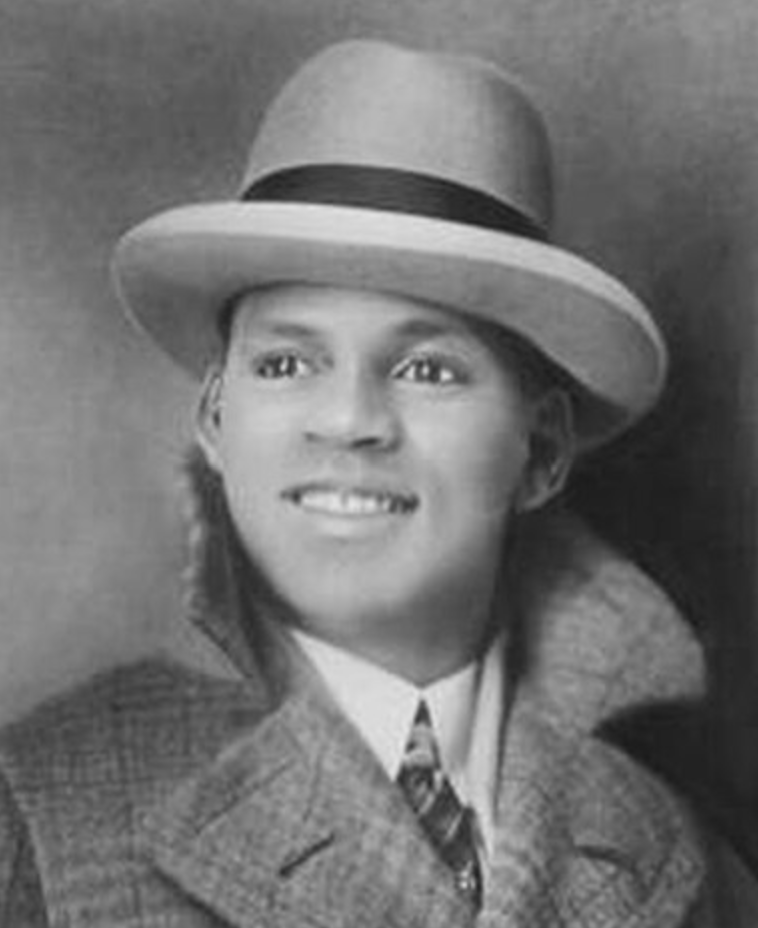
- Hudgins in a publicity photo (c. 1920)

Background information
- Born: May 5, 1896; Baltimore, Maryland, US
- Died: May 5, 1990 (aged 94) Stony Brook University Hospital, New York, US
- Genres: Vaudeville; Mime artist
- Years active: 1914–1950s

Johnny Hudgins (May 5, 1896 – May 5, 1990) was an American vaudeville performer and mime artist. He performed in blackface, which was controversial but common for Black artists at the time. Hudgins was known as the 'Black Charlie Chaplin' and the 'Wah-Wah Man' and for his funny mime performances accompanied by accomplished trumpeters. He was at the height of his career in the 1920s, particularly in Paris, where he became a well-known artist.

== Early career ==
Born in Baltimore, Maryland, Hudgins began his career as a stagehand, earning $5 a week lifting and lowering the curtain at the William Daly Theatre. He developed a song-and-dance routine in local theatres in Baltimore before joining the White burlesque circuit, which he toured for several years. Hudgins became known as a "comic pantomimist in blackface, using Chaplinesque hand and arm gestures along with slides reminiscent of burlesque."

Hudgins was an 'eccentric' dancer; that is, a dancer who has his own non-standard movements and performs with his individual style. Over the years, he developed his act into a pantomime blackface routine. He used burnt cork to blacken his face and performed with exaggerated painted-on white lips, which at the time was still a common if no longer universal stage practice that was not used by just White performers. While blackface later was condemned for its racial stereotyping, at the time, in the words of Black vaudevillian Harold Cromer, "That's what you did if you wanted to eat." "To be funny then, colored comedians had to cork up," Hudgins said.

A 1915 review praised the 19-year-old Hudgins a "comer" in the vaudeville scene, noting "a remarkable clever imitation of Charlie Chaplin and his airs are so true to life that he has been dubbed 'the black Charlie Chaplin'." He was always good for two or three recalls and possessed "a mellow voice and a natural aptitude for comedy, that makes one laugh in spite of himself." His imitation of the pioneering black vaudevillian George Walker was "one of the best ever seen."

Another 1915 review described Hudgins as a "good eccentric comedian of Bert Williams type," the pre-1920s star who had become famous by imitating Whites imitating Blacks, and as "the only original 'Black Charlie Chaplin'." Hudgins himself said that his main inspiration for dancing was Bert Williams, and some observers often noticed the similarities, and even named him Williams's successor when the latter died in 1922. He performed in the major Black vaudeville circuit, known as TOBA (Theatre Owners Booking Association, often referred to by Black performers as Tough on Black Artists), where he met his future wife, Mildred Martien, a lifelong friend with Josephine Baker; they both were lined up in the 1922-1923 Creole Follies vaudeville revue.

Amidst the African-American cultural emancipation of the Harlem Renaissance Hudgins star was rising. In 1923, he appeared in Noble Sissle and Eubie Blake's Plantation Days revue at the Café La Marne on Atlantic City's boardwalk that drew on numbers from their all-Black hit Broadway show Shuffle Along, which had wrapped up its run in 1922. He had been winning raving reviews for his comic act in the burlesque Town Scandals revue and was hired for In Bamville when producer Bertram Whitney decided the show needed a stronger second lead. Whitney bought out his contract and offered a salary of $150 to increase to $200 after the show opened in New York. Hudgins had crafted a distinctive routine that blended eccentric dance with pantomime and what was then called "freak" movement, incorporating a moonwalk-like step along with a slow-motion spin, an early instance of and similar to the dance moves of Michael Jackson's signature moonwalk.

== Rare and exceptional talent ==
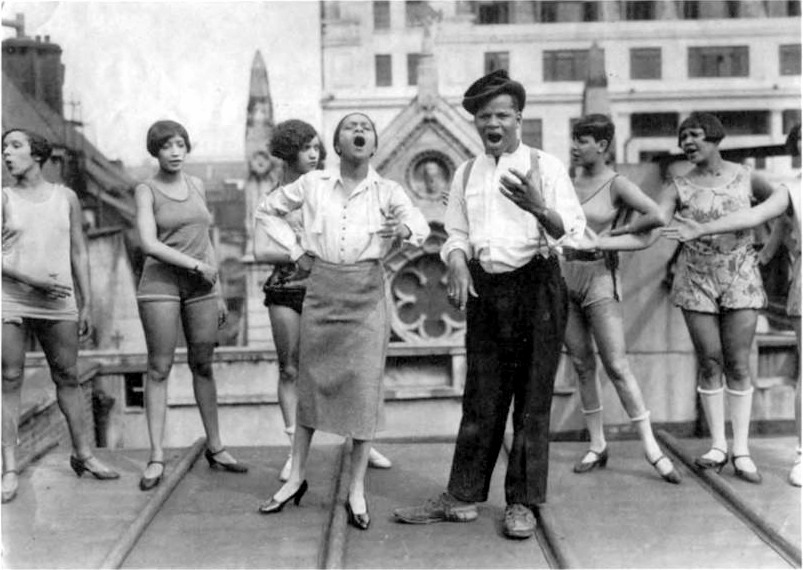
Blackbirds of 1926: Florence Mills, Johnny Hudgins and chorus girls rehearse on roof of the London Pavilion.

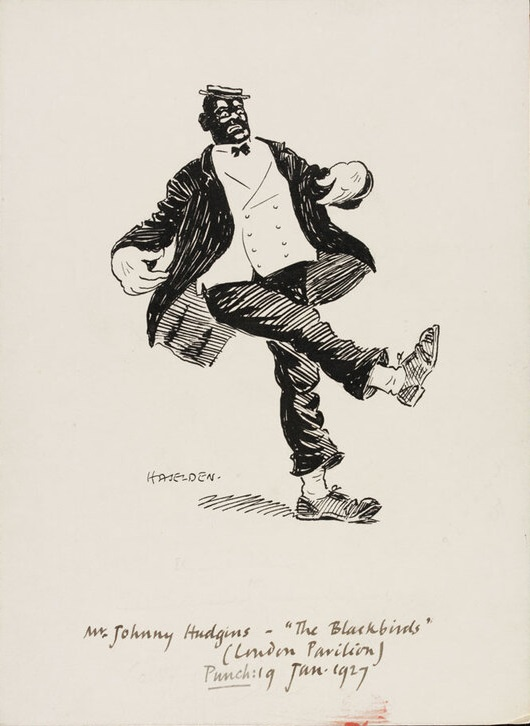
Johnny Hudgins, drawing by William Haselden - Blackbirds in the London Pavilion in 1927

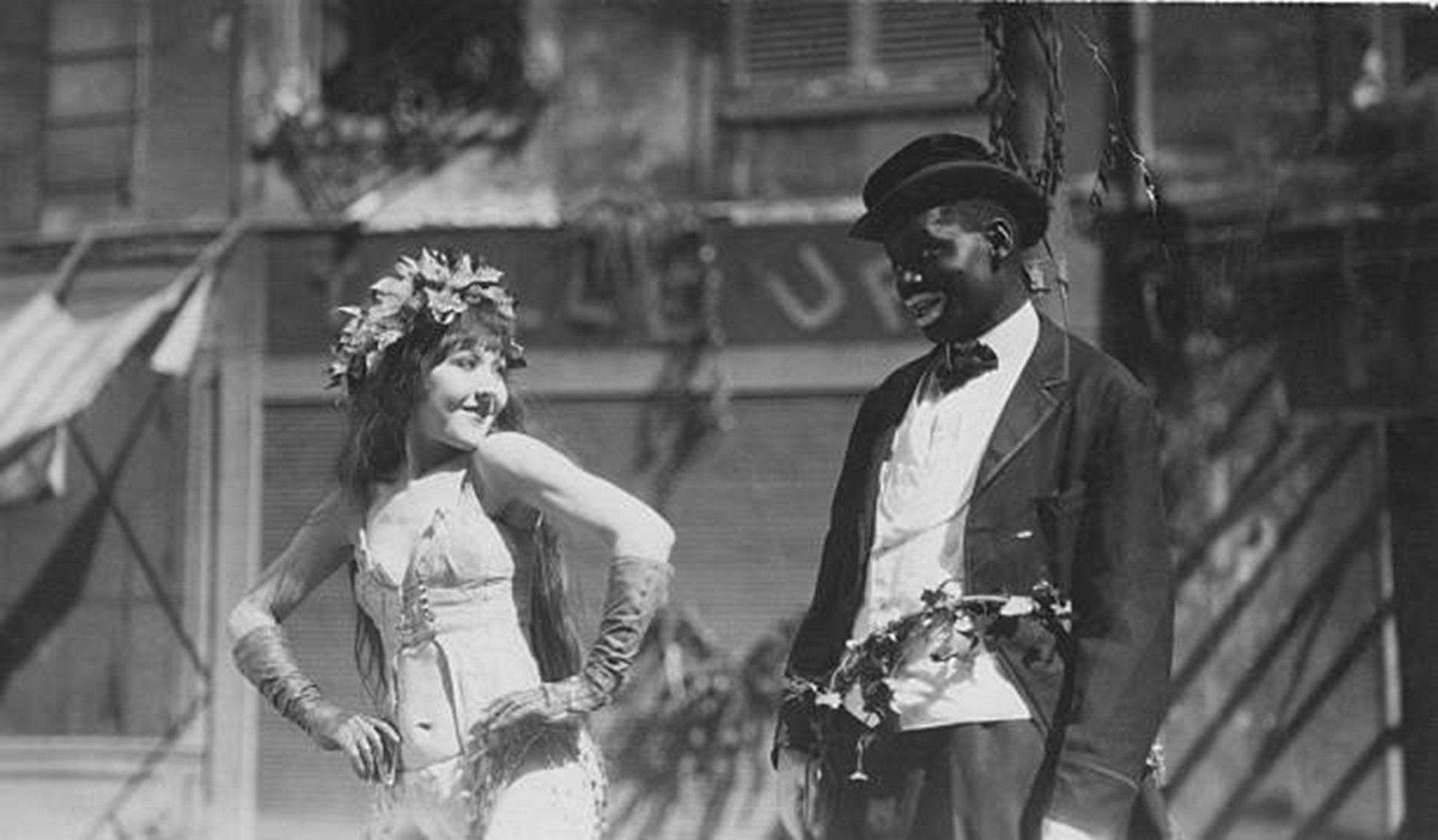
Catherine Hessling and Johnny Hudgins in Charleston Parade

In 1924, Hudgins joined the all-Black Sissle and Blake's revue The Chocolate Dandies, a reworked version of In Bamville. He was received very well; Variety's critic reported that "Johnny really scored the individual hit ... with his peculiar sliding and eccentric stepping and pantomimic warbling." The critic writing for The New York Times likewise called particular attention to Hudgins, praising him for his "pantomimic performance which was as funny as anything one could hope to witness. He was the regular old negro type in tattered attire, and his dancing was original and pleasing."

In this show he invented his Wah-Wah (or Mwa-Mwa) routine, a distinctive pantomime bit in which he mimicked the sound of a lone jazz trumpet, moving his mouth soundlessly in sync while cornetist Joe Smith performed bluesy riffs offstage. He later explained that one evening in the course of the revue's run:

I got hoarse and the trumpet man was making these sounds and I just moved my mouth. The trumpet player caught the way I was doing my mouth and I cut out all the singing and went into pantomime with trumpet and this pantomime song. I named it — Wow, Wow. And I pantomimed throughout the whole show and I pantomimed ever since.

Hudgins would perform this act over many years with different horn players, such as Doc Cheatham, Johnny Dunn, Louie Metcalf and Rex Stewart.

Future vaudeville star Josephine Baker was in the chorus line of Chocolate Dandies. Hudgins found out that Baker was stealing his routines. "I used to go up to the balcony and I'd watch her," he later recalled, "and it was like seeing myself in a mirror. So the next night, I'd put in something new, and sure enough, she'd be doing the new thing the day after." After having risen to stardom in Paris, France, she would impersonate Hudgins in her show at the Folies Bergère.

With pay cuts looming across the cast and his own career gaining momentum, Hudgins chose to exit the Broadway show in favor of a better-paying role as a featured act at a New York nightclub Club Alabam receiving $250 (equivalent to $4,697 in 2025) per week. Hoping to block this move, Bertram Whitney—the White producer behind The Chocolate Dandies—brought a lawsuit against Hudgins for breach of contract. Whitney petitioned the court for an injunction, arguing that Hudgins was a performer of such rare and exceptional talent that he could not be replaced—a legal argument that, by most accounts, had never before been applied to a Black performer. He was also in the unsuccessful Lucky Sambo show.

== In Europe ==
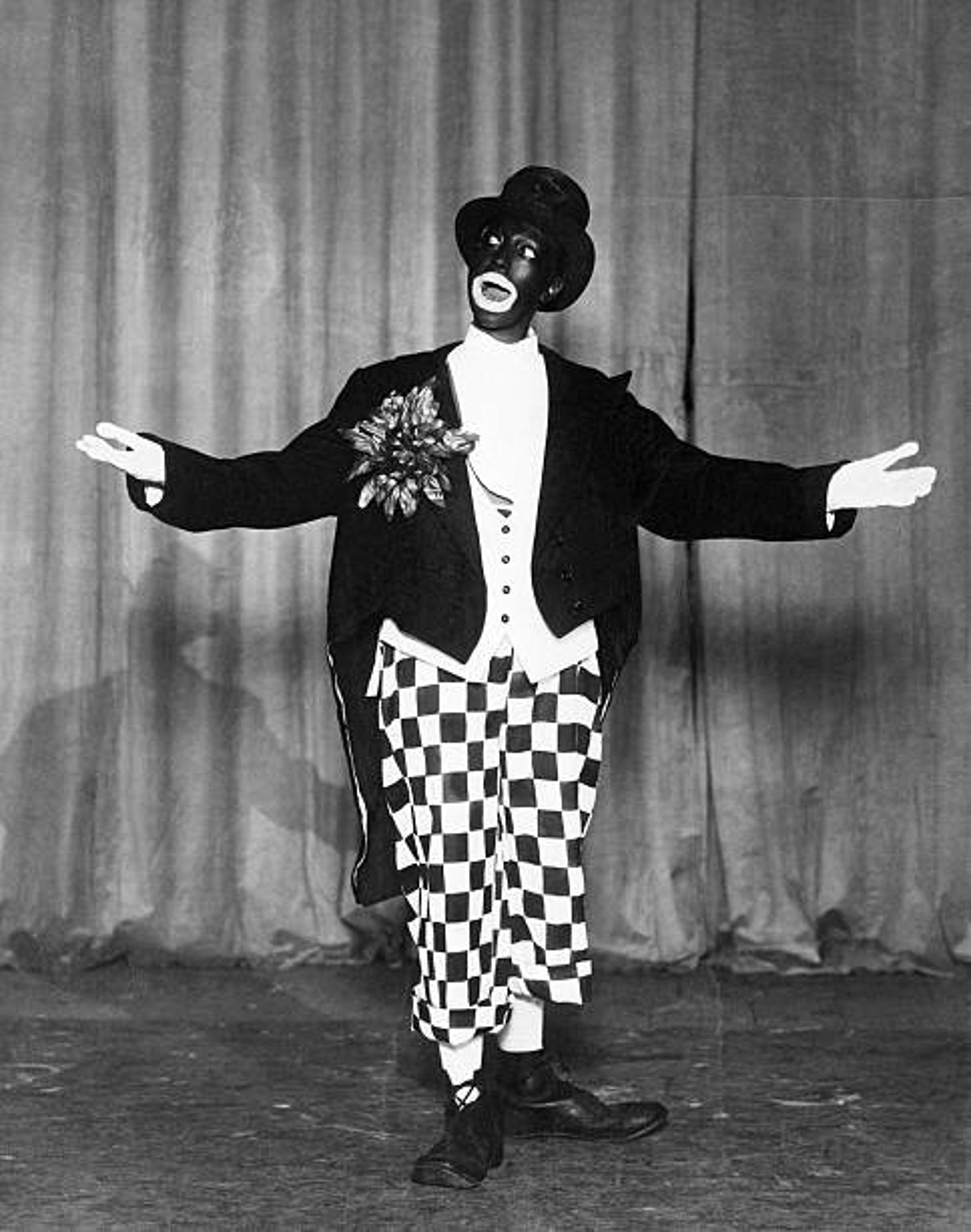
Josephine Baker impersonating Hudgins in the Folies Bergère in 1927

In 1926, Hudgins joined Lew Leslie's Blackbirds. After a tryout at The Harlem Alhambra, the Blackbirds moved to France. The show opened on May 28, 1926, in Paris, at Les Ambassadeurs and was an immediate success, not only for the show's main performer, Florence Mills, but also for Hudgins. His act "In Silence", a silent pantomime in blackface and white gloves performing his wah-wah routine, his unique dance routine and lip sync done while accompanied by the muted cornet of Johnny Dunn, had an appeal that made him a sensation in Paris. One review said: "The star of the colored revue is Florence Mills. She has the voice, the gracefulness, the distinction, but the comedian, Johnny Hudgins, is certainly the most original attraction of the evening. He is the king of clowns."

After the success in Paris, the Blackbirds moved to London where the show opened at the London Pavilion, on Piccadilly Circus, on September 11, 1926, and would run for 279 performances well into 1927. With singer Edith Wilson he also played "a rather saucy bed and telephone" sketch called "Who's On the Phone". Hudgins left the cast in May 1927 to perform at Les Ambassadeurs in Paris (in a show variously entitled Broadway – New York, Broadway in Paris, or Revue America) where he had become very popular. He subsequently also performed in Paris aux etoiles revue at the Moulin Rouge The rehearsal was recorded with image and sound by the first European tour with a Movietone sound newsreel van – see Filmography.

Hudgins became a celebrity in Paris; wah-wah dolls modelled on him were even sold after his performances on the boulevards of Paris. The Dutch/French painter Kees van Dongen portrayed him as Johnny Hudgins Ouaa!! Ouaaa!! in his black-face mime outfit performing his 'Wah-Wah' routine, while Josephine Baker, who in the meantime had become a big star in Paris in La Revue nègre, imitated his act in her show (and unlike many others did credit Hudgins as the originator). He also appeared in the silent futuristic fantasy film Charleston Parade (Sur un air de Charleston) directed by Jean Renoir, where, in a reversal of reality, he is playing an African scientist exploring Paris in 2028 after Europe has been destroyed by a devastating war, where he rediscovers the Charleston (performed by Renoir's wife Catherine Hessling), the original dance of his people, traces of which had been lost for ages.

== Copyrighting his act ==
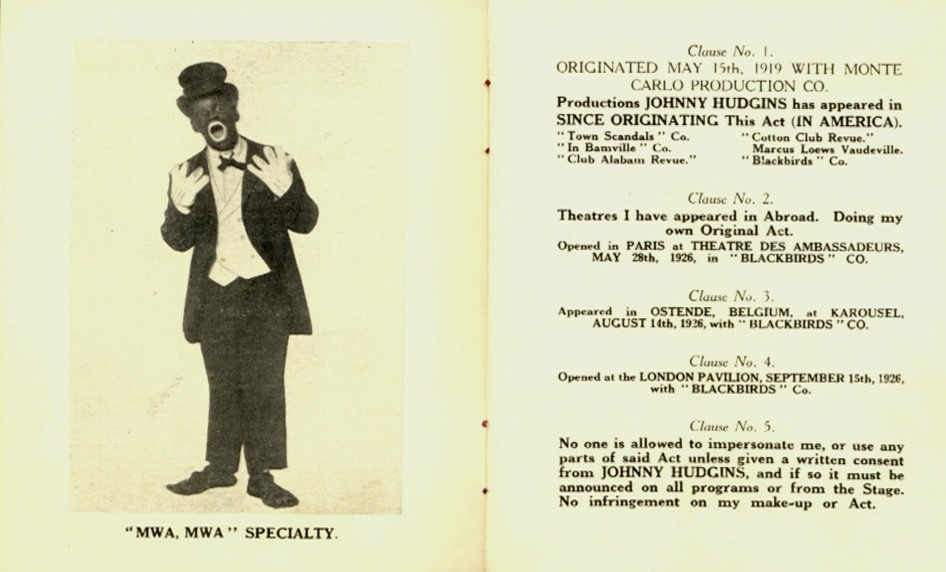
Book giving full description of Johnny Hudgins Own Original Dancing and Pantomime Act, "Entitled Silence"

Because of the numerous impersonations of his performances—including by Josephine Baker—Hudgins secured a copyright in London on a series of his pantomime acts, including his celebrated Wah-Wah routine. A booklet, "In Silence", proclaimed the originality of Hudgins's routines, transcribing his seven specialty acts in detail, and decreed: "No one is allowed to impersonate me, or use any parts of said Act unless given a written consent from JOHNNY HUDGINS, and if so it must be announced on all programs or from the Stage."

The aim was to stem the flow of imitators seeking to capitalise on Hudgins's act, which had become a sensation on both sides of the Atlantic. When Hudgins left for Europe in 1926 with the Blackbirds, other performers flocked to take his place. The Harlem Lincoln Theatre even held a series of Hudgins impersonator contests. In Europe, Hudgins also gained a reputation as "The most imitated comedian on the continent". In a 1928 article in the New York Amsterdam News, Hudgins expressed irritation at the stealing of his act. He threatened to sue "act grabbers" who refused to acknowledge him as the originator of the Mwa Mwa routine, although he was not opposed to impersonators with "the decency ... to give him credit for what they do," as Josephine Baker had done.

== Later career ==
Hudgins's Moulin Rouge contract concluded in April 1928, after which he returned to London for a four-week run at the Kit Kat Club in Haymarket in the West End theatre district. During this British stint, he also performed at the Piccadilly cabaret and took on one-week engagements at both the Alhambra and the Coliseum. Once his Coliseum show wrapped up in May 1928, he traveled to Berlin, performing in Die Schwarze Revue in the Ufa-Palast alongside Sam Wooding's Orchestra through July 15, 1928. He made his way back to the United States by way of Paris in August and rejoined Lew Leslie's Blackbirds at New York's Liberty Theater, but did not visit Europe again.

In the spring of 1930, he took the stage at Loew's Theater as the sole African-American performer among a fifty-person cast, serving as the target for a cowboy's knife-throwing routine. The 1930s saw Hudgins make two journeys to Buenos Aires, Argentina, in 1931 and 1938 (with stopovers in Havana, Cuba), where he headlined a Clarence Robinson review at the Buenos Aires Cotton Club. Domestically, his career included a 1934 tour with the revue Get Lucky, alongside Irene Wiley and he continued to perform until the 1950s. He spent time working in Japan in 1946.

Some accounts suggest Hudgins's popularity declined due to his use of blackface, as the practice grew more controversial amid protests by the National Association for the Advancement of Coloured People (NAACP) condemning it as degrading. After a Washington, DC show prompted a visit from local NAACP representatives, he appeared at the Apollo Theater the following week without makeup for the first time—later admitting backstage that he had felt naked without it. Debate over blackface had simmered since the mid-1930s but wasn't settled until nearly fifteen years later, with the strongest pushback against abandoning it coming from veteran Black comedians who themselves relied on the tradition. Evidence suggests Hudgins continued performing in blackface. In the early 1940s he performed with Silas Green from New Orleans, a traditional minstrel show that toured the South.

== Demise ==
In 1987, Hudgins found himself back in the spotlight against his will when, crippled with arthritis, he was held prisoner for more than a month in his Gordon Heights home by two crack cocaine-dealing brothers. The two men, brothers of Hudgins's adopted daughter Lesa, cheated Hudgins out of the deed to the home where he had lived for 30 years and had kept him a captive while dealing crack. They were arrested and sentenced on drug, grand larceny and forgery charges.

Johnny died at 94 years old on his birthday on May 5, 1990, in the Stony Brook University Hospital, Suffolk County, New York.

== Filmography ==
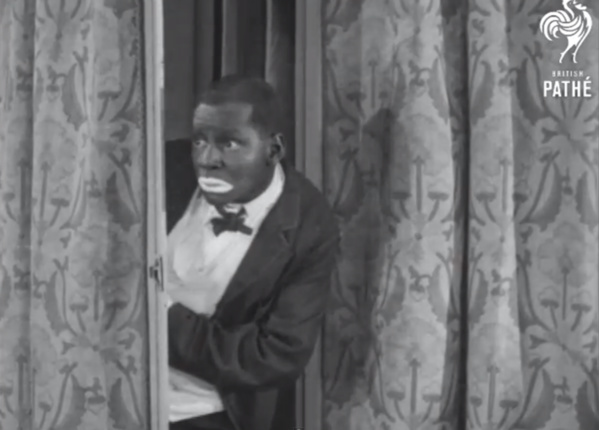
Johnny Hudgins in a still of Feet, Fun and Fancy

- Hudgins at 3:08 mark from A Night in Dixie (1925).
- Hudgins silent Wah Wah routine, produced by pioneer Lee De Forest's Phonofilm, Historic Films Archive at 00:49:35
- Feet - Fun - And Fancy, a British Pathé film of Hudgins performing (1927), which shows his moonwalk and another typical dance routine in which he swings his right leg forward and backward while his left foot slides to and fro on the ground, rocking him back and forth and rotating him simultaneously.
- Jean Renoir's Sur un air de charleston (Charleston Parade) with Catherine Hessling (1927).
- Hudgins in Moulin Rouge Nightclub dress rehearsals for the Paris aux Etoiles show in sound newsreels fragments shot at the Moulin Rouge (Paris, France) in November 1927 from the University of South Carolina's Movietone News collection.

== Sources ==
- Aberjhani; West, Sandra L. (2003). Encyclopedia of the Harlem Renaissance. New York: Facts On File. ISBN 0-8160-4539-9.
- Baker, Jean-Claude; Chase, Chris (2001) [1993]. Josephine Baker: The Hungry Heart. New York: Cooper Square Press. ISBN 0-8154-1172-3.
- Carlin, Richard (2020). Eubie Blake: Rags, Rhythm, and Race. New York, NY: Oxford University Press. ISBN 978-0-19-063593-0.
- Egan, Bill (2004). Florence Mills: Harlem Jazz Queen. Lanham, Md.: Scarecrow Press. ISBN 0-8108-5007-9.
- Fox, Ted (1983). Showtime at the Apollo. New York: Holt, Rinehart, and Winston. ISBN 0-03-060533-4.
- Fry, Andy (2014). Paris Blues: African American Music and French Popular Culture, 1920-1960. Chicago: The University of Chicago Press. ISBN 978-0-226-13878-7.
- Knight, Arthur (2002). Disintegrating the Musical: Black Performance and American Musical Film. Durham, NC: Duke University Press. ISBN 0-8223-2963-8.
- Kraut, Anthea (2016). "Fixing Improvisation: Copyright and African American Vernacular Dancers in the Early Twentieth Century". In Lewis, George E.; Piekut, Benjamin (eds.). The Oxford Handbook of Critical Improvisation Studies. New York: Oxford University Press. pp. 339–353. ISBN 978-0-19-537093-5.
- Marks, Carole (1999). The Power of Pride: Stylemakers and Rulebreakers of the Harlem Renaissance. New York: Crown Publishers. ISBN 0-609-60096-6.
- Peterson, Bernard L., Jr. (1993). A Century of Musicals in Black and White. An encyclopedia of musical stage works by, about, or involving African Americans. Westport, Conn.: Greenwood Press. ISBN 0-313-26657-3.
- Pugh, Megan (2015). America Dancing: From the Cakewalk to the Moonwalk. New Haven, CT: Yale University Press. ISBN 978-0-300-20131-4.
- Sampson, Henry T. (2014). Blacks in Blackface: A Sourcebook on Early Black Musical Shows (Volume 1). Lanham, Md.: The Scarecrow Press. ISBN 978-0-8108-8350-5.
- Schiffman, Jack (1971). Uptown: The Story of Harlem's Apollo Theatre. New York: Cowles Book Company.
- Stearns, Marshall; Stearns, Jean (1994) [1968]. Jazz Dance: The Story of American Vernacular Dance. New York: Da Capo Press. ISBN 978-0-306-80553-0.
- Wipplinger, Jonathan O. (2017). The Jazz Republic: Music, Race, and American Culture in Weimar Germany. Ann Arbor: University of Michigan Press.
- Woll, Allen L (1983). Dictionary of the Black Theatre: Broadway, Off-Broadway, and Selected Harlem Theatre. Westport, Conn.: Greenwood Press. ISBN 0-313-22561-3.
