= Brumes d'automne =

1929 film by Dimitri Kirsanoff

- Directed by: Dimitri Kirsanoff
- Starring: Nadia Sibirskaïa
- Release date: 1929
- Country: France
- Language: Silent

Brumes d'automne (English: Autumn Mists) is a French short film directed by Dimitri Kirsanoff, released in 1929. The 12-minute film features Nadia Sibirskaïa, Kirsanoff's wife at the time, portraying a young woman in anguish over a love that has ended.

The film has no plot, but rather evokes the woman's mood by juxtaposing indoor scenes, in which she takes a last look at her love letters, with scenes of nature. Henri Langlois wrote:

it associates autumn with the death of love ... And there is nothing more beautiful than the scene in which the young woman burns her love letters and reminisces, whilst the fog thickens and the rain disfigures the trees on the pond. And there is nothing more beautiful than when, saddened, she slowly walks along the muddy path, melancholic and tender.

Kirsanoff said that his intention in the film was to represent a state of mind "through drastically changed images in which nature was losing its density and unity."

Paul Arthur described Brumes d'automne as "more pastoral but no less gorgeous" than Kirsanoff's 1926 film Ménilmontant, which also features Sibirskaïa.

The photography was by Jean de Miéville (indoor scenes) and Dimitri Kirsanoff (outdoor scenes). There are no intertitles. The soundtrack consists of a musical score by Paul Devred.
