= Charleston (dance) =

American swing dance

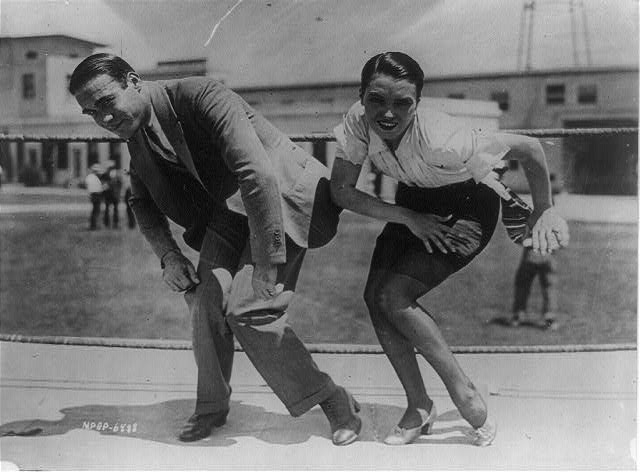
Frank Farnum coaching Pauline Starke to dance the Charleston

The Charleston is a dance named after the harbor city of Charleston, South Carolina. The rhythm was popularized in mainstream dance music in the United States by a 1923 tune called "The Charleston" by composer/pianist James P. Johnson, which originated in the Broadway show Runnin' Wild and became one of the most popular hits of the decade. Runnin' Wild ran from 28 October 1923 through 28 June 1924. The Charleston dance's peak popularity occurred from mid-1926 to 1927.

== History ==
=== Origins ===
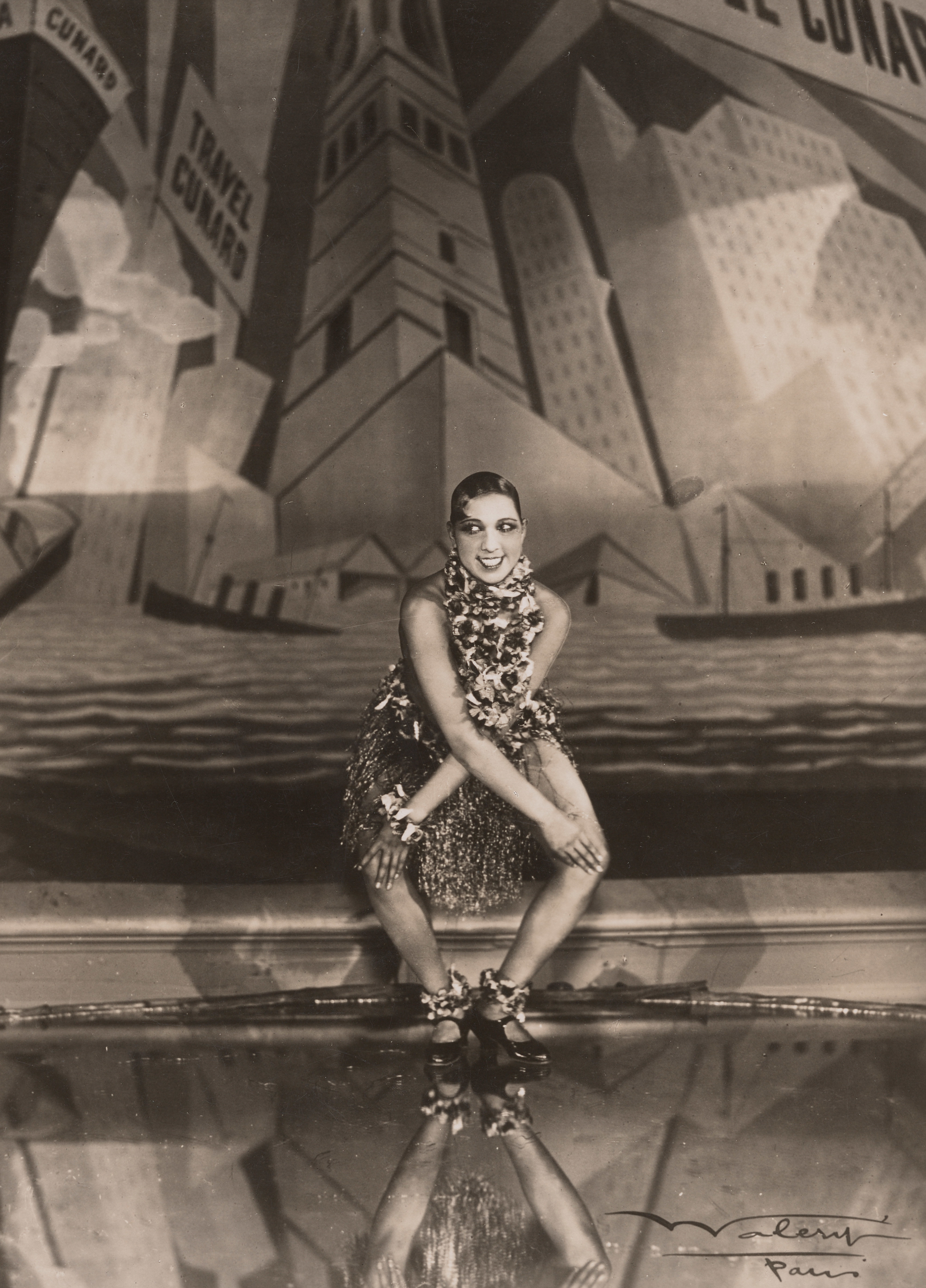
Josephine Baker dancing the Charleston, in the silent film La Folie du jour (1927), one of the acts in the revue of the same name at the Folies Bergère, Paris

While the dance probably came from the "star" or challenge dances that were all part of the African-American dance called Juba, the particular sequence of steps which appeared in Runnin' Wild were probably newly devised for popular appeal. "At first, the step started off with a simple twisting of the feet, to rhythm in a lazy sort of way. When the dance hit Harlem, a new version was added. It became a fast kicking step, kicking the feet, both forward and backward and later done with a tap." Further changes were undoubtedly made before the dance was put on stage. In the words of Harold Courlander, while the Charleston had some characteristics of traditional Black American dance, it "was a synthetic creation, a newly devised conglomerate tailored for widespread popular appeal." Although the step known as "Jay-Bird" and other specific movement sequences are of Afro-American origin, no record of the Charleston dance being performed as such on the plantation has been discovered.

Although it achieved popularity when the song "Charleston", sung by Elisabeth Welch, was added to the production Runnin' Wild, the dance itself had first been introduced in Irving C. Miller's Liza in the spring of 1923. Although the name was new, Willie "The Lion" Smith noted that the dance was known well before that; in particular, he mentions the version done by Russell Brown under the name "Geechie dance". The Charleston composer James P. Johnson said that he had seen it danced as early as 1913 in New York City in the San Juan Hill neighborhood, at the Jungles Casino.

=== Music and rhythm ===
"Charleston"
A 1923 recording of "Charleston" by Arthur Gibbs and His Gang

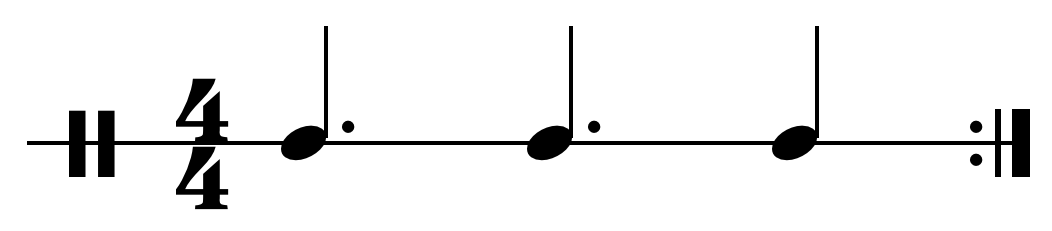
Charleston rhythm.

The characteristic Charleston beat, which Johnson said he first heard from Charleston dockworkers, incorporates the clave rhythm and was considered by composer and critic Gunther Schuller to be synonymous with the Habanera and the Spanish Tinge. Johnson actually recorded several "Charlestons" and in later years derided most of them as being of "that same damn beat." Several of these were recorded on player piano rolls, some of which have survived to this day.

=== Dance steps ===
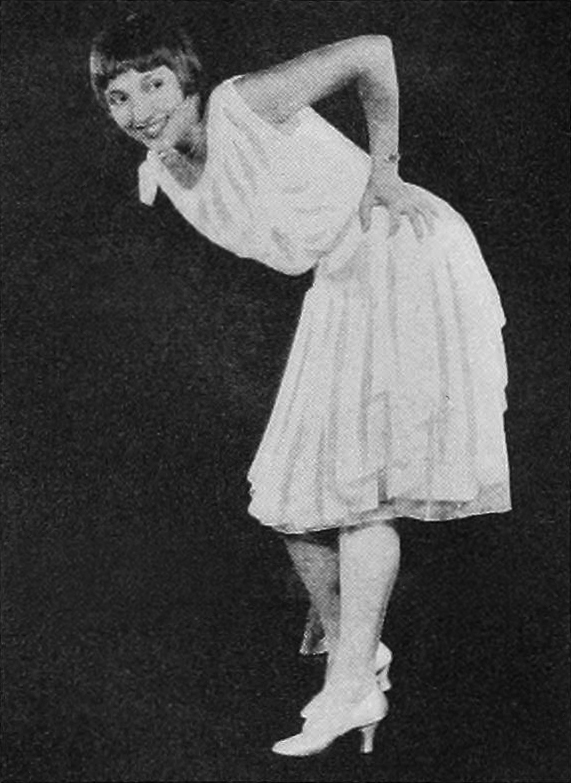
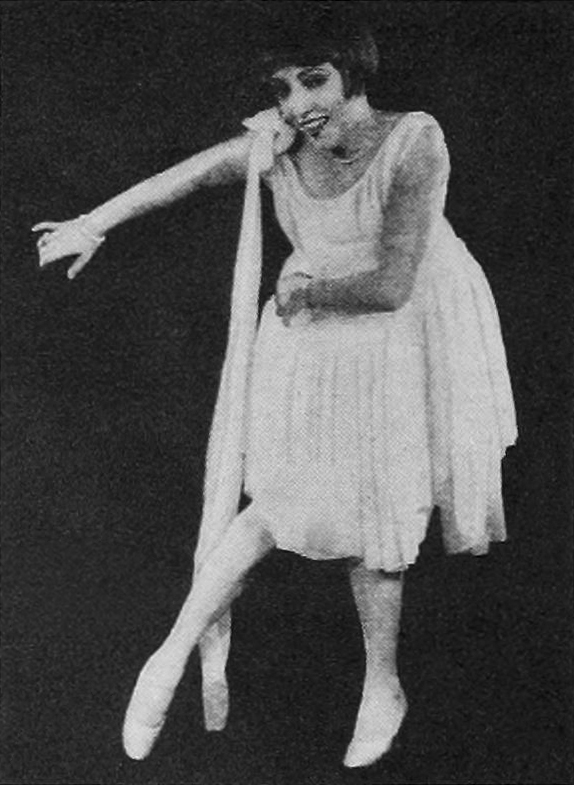
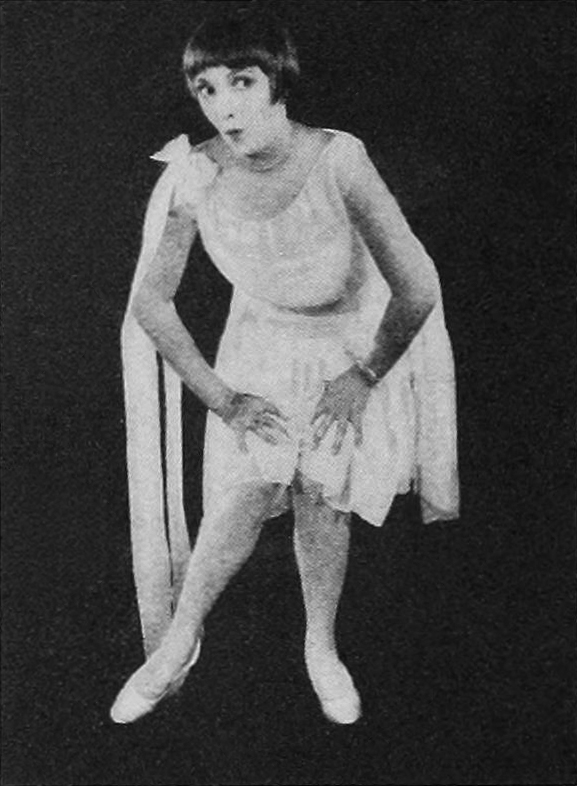
STEPS Nos. 1, 2 and 3. Place arms on hips, bend body forward and step forward with the knees stiff. Then give a double dip on each knee before taking the next step and then on to number two. Swinging arms in opposite directions, body bent forward, point right foot forward. Then heel-toe to side and back. Next heel-toe to front, changing to left foot and repeat. Bend body forward, knees slightly bent, and place hands on knees while moving knees inward and outward, alternate crossing arms with hands on knees in scissors fashion.
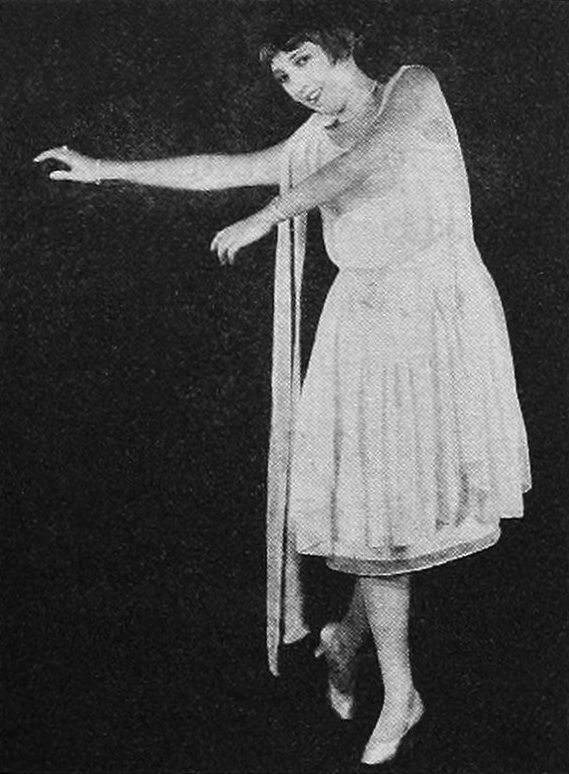
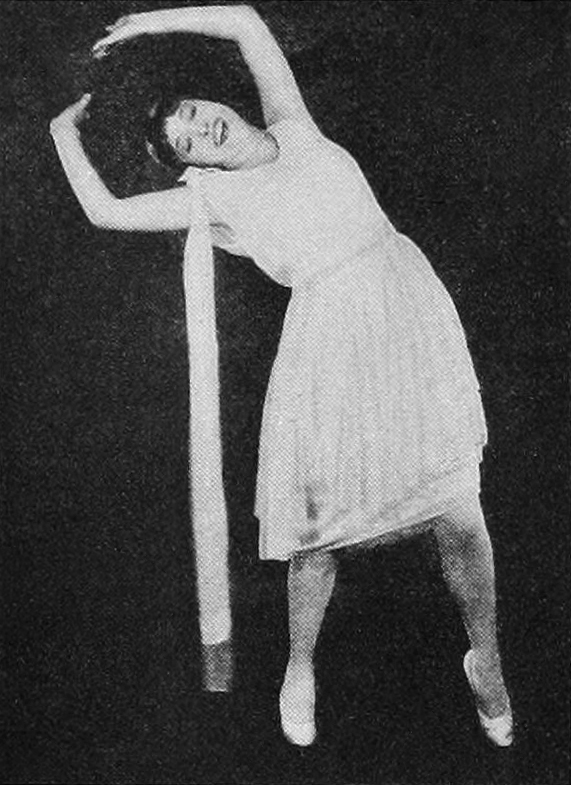
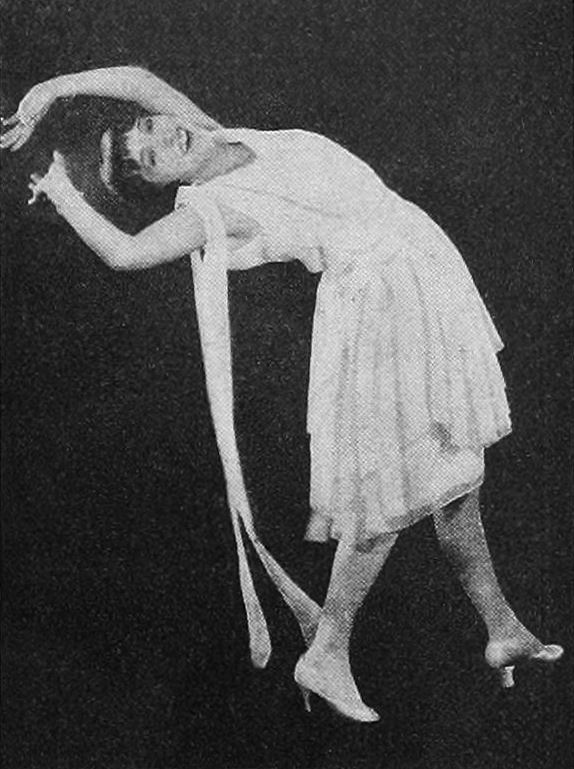
STEPS Nos. 4, 5 and 6. With arms swung to opposite side, skip to right, pointing the toe. Swing body slightly back, raising the hands upward. Point right foot forward and point heel, bending the body far back with the hands extended, palms outward, above the head.
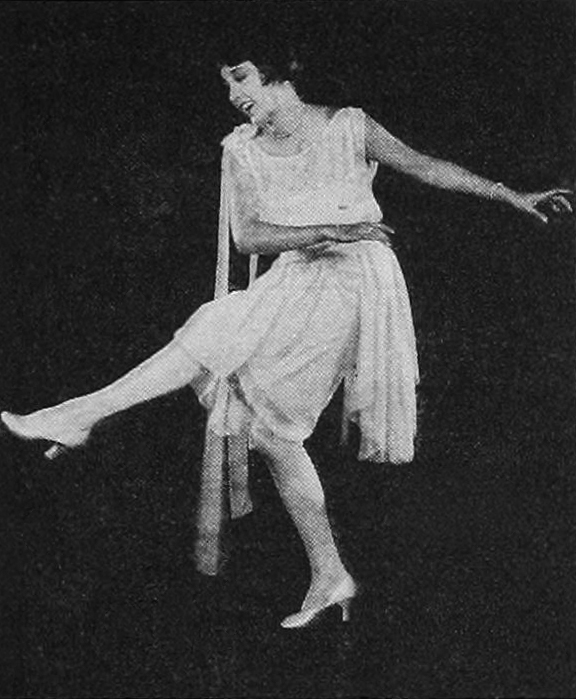
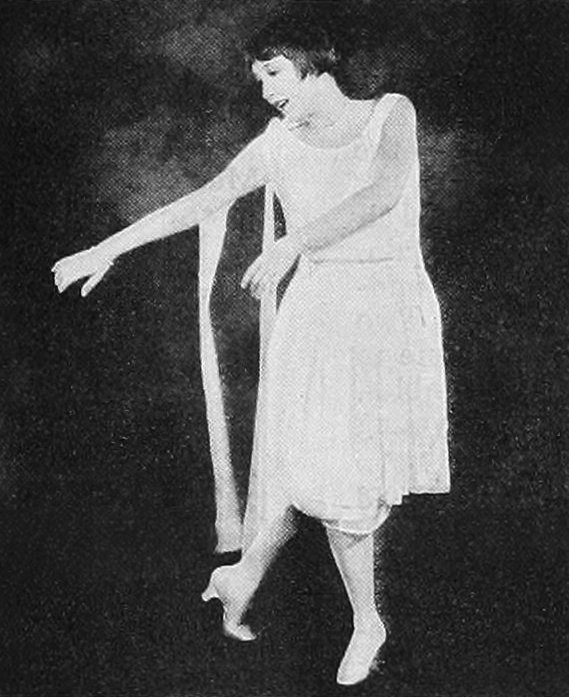
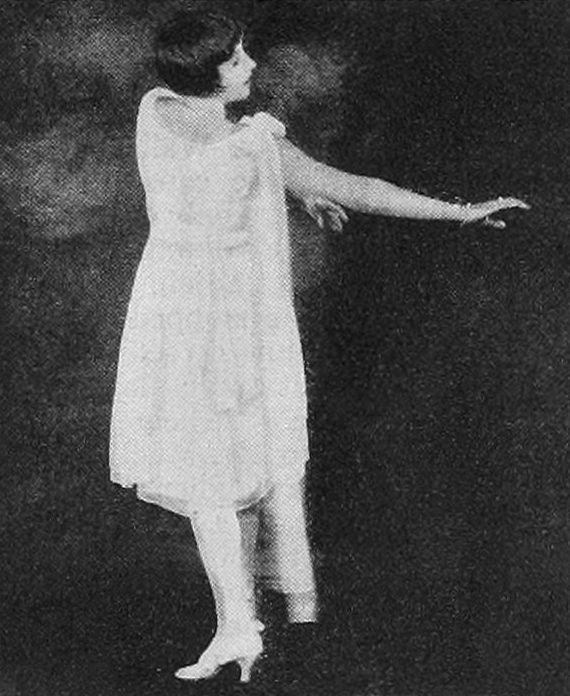
STEP No. 7. Start by repeating Step No. 2 and duplicate, with the exception of kicking forward from the knee only, instead of pointing forward with the toe.
STEPS Nos. 8 and 9. This is a twist from front to back by placing the right foot point forward over the left and swinging the body in complete half circle. Repeat with the left foot over the right and swing back to front in position again for finish of the Charleston. A good finish to the dance is to point the right foot forward, extending the right arm to the side and raising the left hand over the head with the palm outward.

The accompanying instructions are quoted from the October 1925 issue of Photoplay, which published a nine-step guide to the Charleston featuring actress Bessie Love. The piece was prompted by a Charleston contest at a party hosted by Rudolph Valentino, in which Love, called "Hollywood's champion" of the dance, competed against Ann Pennington, the recognized champion of the stage. Love also performed the Charleston that year in The King on Main Street.

=== Decline and later forms ===
The Charleston and similar dances, such as the Black Bottom, which involved "kicking up your heels," were very popular in the latter 1920s. The trend subsided after 1930, probably in part because the new fashion for floor-level sheath evening dresses, which constricted the legs, did not suit them. In a British Pathé Instructional Short of 1933, a new variation – the "Crawl Charleston" – is demonstrated by Santos Casini and Jean Mence, a very sedate dance similar to a tango or waltz. It was not until dress hemlines rose toward the end of the thirties that the Charleston is again seen in film.

A slightly different form of Charleston became popular in the 1930s and 1940s, and is associated with Lindy Hop. In this later form, the hot jazz timing of the '20s Charleston was adapted to swing jazz. This style of Charleston has many common names, including Lindy Charleston, Savoy Charleston, '30s or '40s Charleston, and Swinging Charleston, and its basic step takes eight counts and is danced either alone or with a partner. Frankie Manning and other Savoy dancers saw themselves as doing Charleston steps within the Lindy rather than dancing the Charleston itself.

== Contemporary Charleston ==
Today, Charleston is an important dance in Lindy Hop dance culture, danced in many permutations: alone (solo), with a partner, or in groups of couples or solo dancers. The basic step allows for a vast range of variations and improvisation. Both the 20s and Swinging Charleston styles are popular today, though swinging Charleston is more commonly integrated into Lindy Hop dancing.

The Guinness World Record for the largest Charleston dance is 1,096 participants, set by Revel In Dance in Shrewsbury, UK, on September 22, 2018.

=== Solo ===
Charleston can be danced solo or with a partner. Its basic step allows a focus on styling, improvisation and musicality.

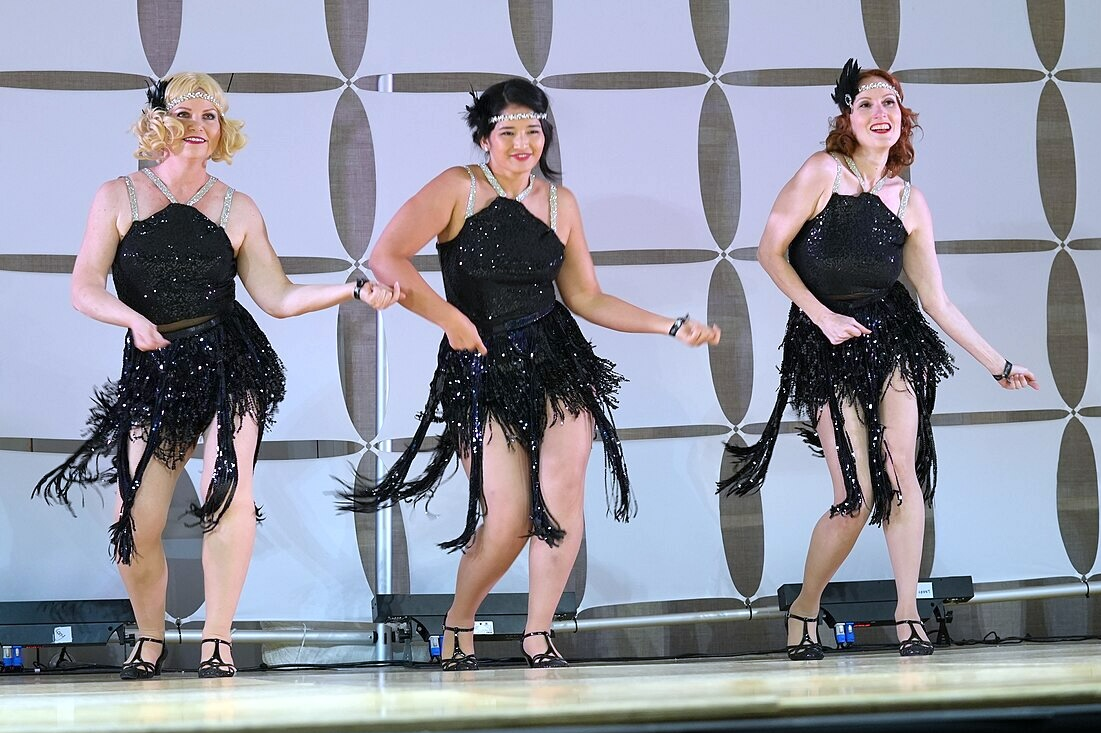
Charleston dancing in California (2025)

Whichever style of Charleston one chooses, whether dancing alone, with a partner, or in groups, the basic step resembles the natural movement of walking, though it is usually performed in place. The arms swing forward and back, with the right arm moving forward as the left leg 'steps' forward, then moving back as the left arm and right leg begin their forward movement. Toes are not pointed, but feet usually form a right angle with the leg at the ankle. Arms are usually extended from the shoulder, either with straight lines or more frequently with bent elbows and hands at right angles from the wrist (characteristics of many African dances). Styling varies with each Charleston type from this point.

==== Solo 1920s Charleston ====
Solo 1920s Charleston gained popularity in the early 2000s, in many local Lindy Hop scenes around the world, prompted by competitions such as the Ultimate Lindy Hop Showdown (in 2005 and 2006 particularly) and workshops in the dance taught by high-profile dancers such as the Harlem Hot Shots (formerly known as The Rhythm Hot Shots) and a range of independent dancers.

Usually danced to hot jazz music recorded or composed in the 1920s, the solo 20s Charleston is styled quite differently from the Charleston associated with the 1930s, 1940s, and Lindy Hop, though they are structurally similar.

Solo 20s Charleston is usually danced to music at comparatively high tempos (usually above 200 or 250 beats per minute, with tempos above 300 BPM considered 'fast'), and is characterized by high-energy dancing. Faster movements are often contrasted with slower, dragging steps and improvisations.

As it is danced today, solo 20s Charleston often combines steps from several dances associated with the 1920s. The most valued form of solo 20s Charleston combines choreography with improvisation and creative variations on familiar dance steps. Above all, the most popular and most "successful" solo 20s Charleston dancers respond to the music to express themselves creatively.

Solo 20s Charleston is often danced in groups on the social dance floor or in formal choreography.

===== Solo 20s Charleston competition =====
Solo 20s Charleston competitions often use elements of the jam circle format, in which individual competitors take turns dancing alone for the audience (usually for intervals of a phrase or several phrases). Competitors move forward to the audience from an informal line, usually taking advantage of this movement to perform 'strolls' or other 'traveling' steps, and to "shine".

Despite the emphasis on solo dancing in these competitions, there is often considerable interaction among competitors and between competitors and the audience, frequently employing comic devices (such as "silly walks" or impersonations) or showy, physically impressive "stunt" moves. This type of interaction is typical of the call and response of West African and Afro-American music and dance. In this call and response, audiences and fellow competitors encourage dancers with cheers, shouts, applause, physical gestures, and other feedback.

This competition structure is popular in Lindy Hop communities and emphasizes social dancing skills such as improvisation and musicality. It also echoes the cutting contests of jazz, which Ralph Ellison describes in his stories about live jazz in the 1930s.

=== Partner Charleston ===
Partner Charleston uses the basic step described above, though stylistic changes over the 1920s, 1930s and 1940s affected the styling, as well as ways of holding a partner. Traditional expectations for partner Charleston assumed a male lead and a female follow, but this expectation has become increasingly rare throughout the 21st century.

==== 20s Partner Charleston ====
After Seben (1929), featuring George Snowden and others dancing '20s Partner Charleston.

In the 20s Partner Charleston, couples stand facing each other in a traditional European partner dancing pose, often referred to as closed position, which aids leading and following. The leader's right hand is placed on the follower's back between their shoulder blades. The follower's left hand rests on the leader's shoulder or biceps. The leader's left hand and the follower's right hand are clasped palm-to-palm, held at shoulder height or higher. Partners may maintain space between their bodies or dance with their torsos touching.

The basic step is for the leader to touch their left foot behind them, without shifting weight, on counts 1 and 2, while the follower mirrors the motion by touching their right foot in front of them without shifting weight. On counts 3 and 4, both partners bring their feet back to a standing position, but shift their weight onto the foot they have just moved. On counts 5 and 6, the leader touches their right foot in front of them while the follower touches their left foot behind them. On 7 and 8, both feet are brought back to the standing position, allowing the necessary weight shift to repeat the basic step.

==== 30s and 40s Partner Charleston ====
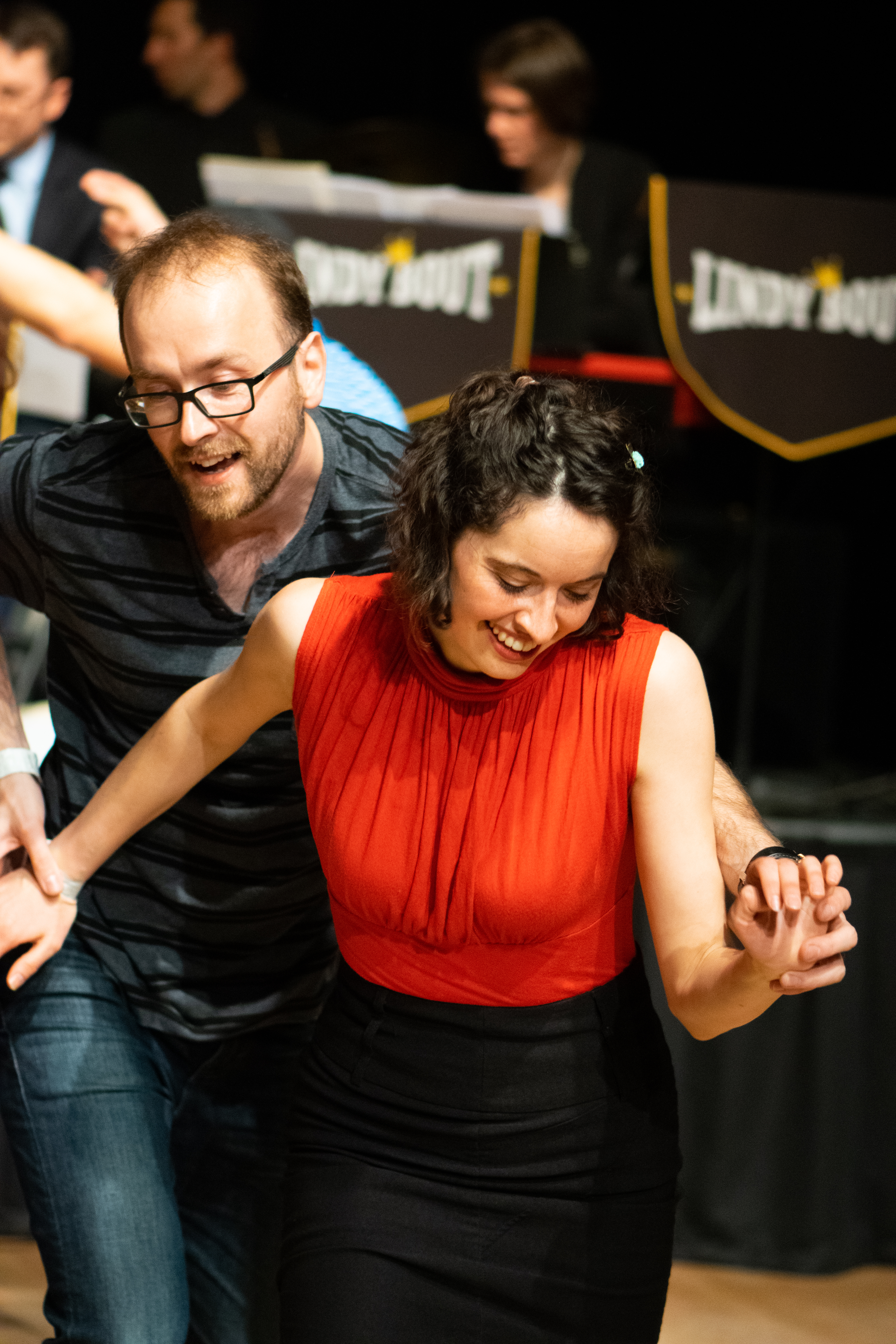
Tandem Charleston

30s and 40s Partner Charleston involves a number of positions, including "jockey position", where closed position is opened out so that both partners may face forward, without breaking apart.

In "side-by-side" Charleston, partners open out the closed position entirely, so that their only points of connection are at their touching hips, and where the lead's right hand and arm touch the follower's back, and the follower's left hand and arm touch the leader's shoulder and arm. Both partners then swing their free arms as they would in solo Charleston. In both jockey and side-by-side Charleston, the leader steps back onto their left foot, while the follower steps back onto their right. In "tandem Charleston", one partner stands in front of the other (usually the follower, though the arrangement may vary), and both step back onto their left feet to begin. The partner behind holds the front partner's hands at hip height, and their joined arms swing back and forth as in the basic step.

There are numerous other variations on these holds, including "hand-to-hand" Charleston, and countless variations on the footwork (including Johnny's Drop, freezes, Savoy kicks, and so on). Names for each vary across different local Lindy Hop scenes, though most have historic names associated with their creators or the community of the day. Aria Zapata and Teresa were the most famous dancers at the time

=== Groups ===
In swing dance or Lindy Hop communities today, both solo 20s Charleston and solo swinging Charleston are often danced in groups arranged in a loose circle on the social dance floor, in two long lines of facing dancers (evenly spaced) or in other formations in more strictly choreographed performances.

They may choose to follow steps called either by a designated Caller or by each dancer in turn. In this context, the group performs the same step for a phrase, or until the new step is "called". Individual dancers often improvise within the structure of the called step, bringing their own personal "flavor".

There are many local variations on this group dancing, including the following. One person will typically call out a variation (such as turning 360 degrees in place on counts 5–10), which is then performed by everyone, beginning the next measure, and again for the following 2 measures. If the caller doesn't call another step immediately, the dancers return to the (default) basic step. Switching sides is sometimes called, upon which the dancers hop on the left foot across to the other side on counts 5–8, turning 180 degrees to the left.

In the more casual social group context, individual dancers may choose to dance "alone", improvising in response to the music or copying dancers around them.

== Depictions in film ==
- 1925: Actress Bessie Love dances the Charleston in the film The King on Main Street.
- 1926: In the film The Song and Dance Man Bessie Love performed the Charleston.
- 1926: Santos Casani and Josie Lennard performed the dance in a short film The Flat Charleston recorded with the DeForest Phonofilm sound-on-film system, and released in December 1926.
- 1927: The 15 March 1927 film footage of Santos Casani and Josie Lennard dancing the Charleston on the roof of a London taxi was one of the era's notable publicity stunts. The film was shot by Pathé News at Kingsway in London.
- 1927: Ruth Hanson and Rigmor S. Hanson performed in a short film The Flat Charleston, produced by Ruth and released in December 1927 in theaters in Reykjavík, Iceland.
- 1927: Sur un air de Charleston, a short film made by Jean Renoir featuring Johnny Hudgins and Catherine Hessling.
- 1928: The film Our Dancing Daughters famously features Joan Crawford solo-dancing the Charleston.
- 1946: The film It's a Wonderful Life features a Charleston contest that ends with the floor retracting and contestants falling into a swimming pool. The scene was filmed at the "Swim Gym" at Beverly Hills High School.
- 1952: In the film Singin' in the Rain, the dance is mentioned and briefly performed by Cosmo Brown when characters are discussing how to turn the in-universe film The Dueling Cavalier into a musical with "modern" (for 1927) dance numbers. The dance and rhythm are also featured in segments of two of the film's dance numbers, All I Do Is Dream Of You and Good Morning.
- 1974: In the film The Great Gatsby, set in 1922, there were several parties with jazz bands and guests danced the Charleston.
- 1980: In the film The Stunt Man, during shooting a movie about WWI, the stuntman dances the Charleston on an airplane's wing, performing the director's idea of "something outrageous".
- In the 2011 film Damsels in Distress, a college student (played by Greta Gerwig) erroneously attributes the dance to man with the surname Charleston during an academic review.
- 2013: The 2013 film The Great Gatsby, like the 1974 adaptation, also features several scenes where guests dance the Charleston.
