= Espionage (1929 film) =

1929 film

- Directed by: Jean Choux
- Written by: Jean Choux
- Starring: Lilian Constantini; Véra Sherbane; Thérèse Reignier
- Cinematography: Ganzli Walter
- Production company: Isis-Films
- Release date: 26 April 1929
- Running time: 96 minutes
- Country: France
- Languages: Silent; French intertitles

Espionage (French: Espionnage) is a 1929 French silent war spy film directed by Jean Choux and starring Lilian Constantini, Véra Sherbane and Thérèse Reignier. It was inspired by the story of the First World War spy Louise de Bettignies active in German-occupied Belgium. The film's sets were designed by the art director Gaston David. It is also known by the longer title Espionnage ou la guerre sans armes.

== Cast ==
- Lilian Constantini as Geneviève de Vendeville
- Véra Sherbane as Maria Vandamme
- Thérèse Reignier as Madame Estienne
- Jean Choux as L'officier allemand
- Jean Dalbe as Charles
- Edmée Colson as La contre-espionne
- Fritz Karr as Prince Galitzine

== Bibliography ==
- Krawc, Alfred. International Directory of Cinematographers, Set- and Costume Designers in Film: France (from the beginnings to 1980). Saur, 1983.
- Rège, Philippe. Encyclopedia of French Film Directors, Volume 1. Scarecrow Press, 2009.
