= Véra Flory =

German-born French actress (1907–2006)

- Born: 18 August 1907; Jena, German Empire
- Died: 29 November 2006 (aged 99); Paris, France, France
- Other name: Wera Salkind
- Occupation: Actress
- Years active: 1924–1939 (film)

Véra Flory (1907–2006) was a German-born French film actress of the silent and early sound eras.

== Selected filmography ==
- Two Timid Souls (1928)
- Cousin Bette (1928)
- The Feather (1929)
- The Unknown Dancer (1929)
- Let's Get Married (1931)
- American Love (1931)
- Motherhood (1935)
- The Alibi (1937)
- The Most Beautiful Girl in the World (1938)

== Bibliography ==
- Goble, Alan. The Complete Index to Literary Sources in Film. Walter de Gruyter, 1999.
- Powrie, Phil & Rebillard, Éric. Pierre Batcheff and stardom in 1920s French cinema. Edinburgh University Press, 2009.
