= The Guardian Angel (1934 film) =

1934 film

- Directed by: Jean Choux
- Written by: Jean Choux
- Produced by: Jean Choux
- Starring: André Baugé; Pola Illéry; Paul Azaïs
- Music by: Armand Bernard
- Production company: Films Sonores Tobis
- Distributed by: Films Sonores Tobis
- Release date: 23 February 1934
- Running time: 91 minutes
- Country: France
- Language: French

The Guardian Angel (French: L'ange gardien) is a 1934 French comedy film directed by Jean Choux and starring André Baugé, Pola Illéry and Paul Azaïs. The film's sets were designed by the art director Lazare Meerson. It was produced by the French subsidiary of Tobis Film at the company's Epinay Studios.

== Synopsis ==
Singer André Soral returns to his former job as a sailor. He falls in love with Pola, the daughter of the owner of a barge.

== Cast ==
- André Baugé as André Soral
- Pola Illéry as Pola
- Paul Azaïs as Fred
- Christiane Delyne as Christiane
- Jean Wall as L'impressario
- Robert Goupil as Gaspard - un marinier
- Guy Derlan as Le secrétaire
- Arthur Devère as L'aveugle
- Thérèse Reignier

== Bibliography ==
- Bessy, Maurice & Chirat, Raymond. Histoire du cinéma français: 1929-1934. Pygmalion, 1988.
- Crisp, Colin. Genre, Myth and Convention in the French Cinema, 1929-1939. Indiana University Press, 2002.
- Rège, Philippe. Encyclopedia of French Film Directors, Volume 1. Scarecrow Press, 2009.
