= The Vocation of André Carel =

1925 film

- Directed by: Jean Choux
- Written by: Jean Choux
- Produced by: Jean Choux; Hazard-Joseph de Ruyter
- Starring: Stéphane Audel; Blanche Montel; Michel Simon
- Cinematography: Charles-Georges Duvanel; Paul Guichard
- Edited by: Jean Choux
- Production companies: Les Films H.D.R. Production Jean Choux
- Distributed by: Cosmograph
- Release date: 9 October 1925
- Running time: 96 minutes
- Countries: France; Switzerland
- Languages: Silent; French intertitles

The Vocation of André Carel (French: La vocation d'André Carel) is a 1925 French-Swiss silent comedy drama film directed by Jean Choux and starring Stéphane Audel, Blanche Montel and Michel Simon. It was shot at the Cité Elgé Studios in Paris and on location in the Alpine resort towns of Evian and Montreux in Switzerland. It is also known by the alternative title La Puissance du travail. It was the director's debut film, and also featured an early screen appearance from Simon who would go on to be a mainstay of French cinema over the following decades.

== Cast ==
- Stéphane Audel as André Carel
- Blanche Montel as Reine Lugrin
- Camille Bert as Jean Carel - le père d'André
- Michel Simon as Gaston Lebeau - le précepteur
- Maurice Destain as Le père Lugrin
- Thérèse Reignier as La mère Lugrin
- Jean Cyri as Louis Cardan
- Héléna Manson as L'amoureuse de Cardan
- Fabien Reignier as L'enfant

== Bibliography ==
- Clarke, David B. & Doel, Marcus A. Moving Pictures/Stopping Places: Hotels and Motels on Film. Lexington Books, 2009.
- Oscherwitz, Dayna & Higgins, MaryEllen . The A to Z of French Cinema. Scarecrow Press, 2009.
