= Sables (film) =

1927 film

- Directed by: Dimitri Kirsanoff
- Written by: Dimitri Kirsanoff
- Cinematography: Roger Hubert
- Release date: 1927
- Country: France
- Languages: Silent; French intertitles

Sables is a 1927 French silent film directed by Dimitri Kirsanoff and starring Colette Darfeuil, Gina Manès and Nadia Sibirskaïa.

Richard Abel, in his history of French cinema of this period, positions Sables firmly in a wave of films made at this time in the exotic locations of North Africa and the French colonies. Sables was one of a series made by French filmmakers at this time: Toussaint's Inch’Allah, Luitz-Morat's Le sang d’Allah ("Allah's blood") and Hugon's Yasmina.

Sables fits into this pattern with a melodramatic plot that uses the Tunisian desert as its background adding mystery and the unknown.

The cast included the director's wife at the time, Nadia Sibirskaïa, who played a similar role for him in Menilmontant.

The cinematographer was Roger Hubert in what was his third feature, subsequently lighting Les Visiteurs du Soir and Les Enfants du Paradis.

Kirsanoff had no illusions about what he had made: he described the film as "Terrible, childish, stupid, merely amusing…an imbecile wrote the story".

The film exists in archives, but is not publicly available.

== Cast ==
- Colette Darfeuil - Gladys
- Gina Manès - Madame de Varennes
- Edmond Van Daële - Monsieur de Varennes
- Nadia Sibirskaïa - Yvonne

== Bibliography ==
- Dayna Oscherwitz & MaryEllen Higgins. The A to Z of French Cinema. Scarecrow Press, 2009.
