= Thérèse Reignier =

French actress

- Born: 10 September 1891; Annecy, France
- Died: 16 October 1952 (aged 61); Paris, France
- Occupation: Actress
- Years active: 1925-1938 (film)

Thérèse Reignier (1891–1952) was a French stage and film actress. She appeared in films made by her husband the director Jean Choux.

== Selected filmography ==
- The Vocation of André Carel (1925)
- The Dying Land (1927)
- The Kiss That Kills (1928)
- Espionage (1929)
- La servante (1930)
- The Guardian Angel (1934)
- Motherhood (1935)
- Peace on the Rhine(1938)

== Bibliography ==
- Pithon, Rémy. Cinéma suisse muet: lumières et ombres. Antipodes, 2002.
- Rège, Philippe. Encyclopedia of French Film Directors, Volume 1. Scarecrow Press, 2009.
