= Dimitri Kirsanoff =

French film director

- Born: Markus David Sussmanovitch Kaplan; 6 March 1899; Juryev, Governorate of Livonia, Russian Empire (modern Tartu, Estonia)
- Died: 11 February 1957 (aged 57); Paris, France
- Education: École Normale de Musique, Paris
- Occupation: Film director
- Spouse(s): Nadia Sibirskaïa; Berthe Noëlla Bessette (later known as Monique Kirsanoff)

Dimitri Kirsanoff (Russian: Димитрий Кирсанов, né Markus David Sussmanovitch Kaplan, Маркус Давид Зусманович Каплан; 6 March 1899 – 11 February 1957) was a Russian-French early film-maker working in France, sometimes considered part of the French Impressionist movement in film. He is known for some poetic silent films which he made independently, especially the medium-length Ménilmontant, but he was less successful with commercial films in the sound era.

== Early life ==
Kirsanoff was born Markus David Sussmanovitch Kaplan on 5 March 1899 in Tartu (then Juryev), Estonia, then Russian Empire. Many of the facts about his early life have been difficult to verify, and different sources have lent support to alternative accounts. It seems that his parents were Lithuanian Jews who had come to Tartu in 1870. After the murder of his father by Bolsheviks in 1919, Kirsanoff left Tartu and made his way to Paris, where he had arrived by 1921, and at some stage he adopted the name of Dimitri Kirsanoff instead of Markus Kaplan. He pursued his musical interests, studying the cello and playing in an orchestra accompanying silent films.

As his interest in cinema grew, he met an aspiring young actress called Germaine Lebas, from Brittany, and she, under the new name of Nadia Sibirskaïa, became his partner and collaborator in his films throughout the 1920s.

== Career ==
During the period 1921-1929 (the last years of silent cinema) Kirsanoff completed five fiction films (three features and two short or medium-length), all of them featuring the actress Nadia Sibirskaïa. By his own admission, he knew little of film technique when he began, and he had no contact with the French avant-garde or with other Russian émigré film-makers in France, many of whom were linked to the Albatros production company. He worked independently and with limited technical resources, sometimes producing visual effects of dissolves and montage sequences in the camera.

Ménilmontant (1926)

Kirsanoff's approach to film-making was preoccupied most of all by the image - how it is composed and how it relates to other images, and not just for its capacity to illustrate a story. In Ménilmontant, he created a poetic portrait of the working-class district of Paris using visual devices such as superimpositions, recurring images, dissolves, and unexpected juxtapositions, while the melodramatic narrative, about two sisters orphaned after the murder of their parents, was sketched elliptically and with uncertain chronology. Another of Kirsanoff's concerns in this (and his previous film) was to eliminate the use of intertitles from the narrative, obliging the spectator to engage with it wholly in visual terms. Despite its modest length, Ménilmontant became Kirsanoff's most fully and enduringly appreciated film, especially among 'art-house' audiences.

Kirsanoff's first sound film was Rapt (1934), based on La Séparation des races by Charles Ferdinand Ramuz, and produced in Switzerland. Use of dialogue is kept to a minimum, but greater prominence is taken on by the musical score, written by Arthur Honegger and Arthur Hoérée. The finished film received very limited distribution however, and although it went on to gather admiration from film historians, it could not compete in a market increasingly dominated by large American companies. It was the last feature film which Kirsanoff had the freedom to work as he wanted.

For the remainder of his career Kirsanoff's work alternated between miscellaneous commercial features and documentaries, with occasional short films of a more personal character which were financed by his own company (such as Arrière-saison and La Mort du cerf). He was inactive during the years of the German Occupation.

In 1939 (having separated from Nadia Sibirskaïa) Kirsanoff married Berthe Noëlla Bessette, a film editor, who then became known as Monique Kirsanoff.

Kirsanoff died suddenly from a heart attack in Paris on 11 February 1957, at the age of 57.

== Filmography ==
- 1923: L'Ironie du destin; feature film, believed lost
- 1926: Ménilmontant; medium length film
- 1927: Sables; feature film
- 1927: Destin; feature film
- 1929: Brumes d'automne; short
- 1929: Impressions africaines; short; filmed during making of Sables
- 1934: Rapt: la séparation des races; feature film
- 1936: Visages de France; medium length, believed lost
- 1936: Les Berceaux; short (Cinéphonie), accompanied by Fauré's song
- 1936: La Fontaine d'Aréthuse; short (Cinéphonie), accompanied by music of Szymanowski
- 1936: Jeune Fille au jardin; short (Cinéphonie), accompanied by Mompou's music
- 1937: Franco de port; feature film
- 1938: L'Avion de minuit; feature film
- 1938: La Plus Belle Fille du monde; feature film
- 1939: Quartier sans soleil; feature film (released 1945)
- 1946: Deux amis; short, based on story by Maupassant
- 1950: Faits divers à Paris; feature film
- 1950: Alerte au lait sale; short, commissioned documentary
- 1950: 22 Boulevard Carnot; short, commissioned documentary
- 1950: Arrière-saison; short
- 1952: La Mort du cerf: une chasse à courre; short
- 1952: Conte de la forêt; short
- 1953: Le Témoin de minuit; feature film
- 1955: Mécanisation et remembrement; short, commissioned documentary
- 1955: Le Crâneur; feature film
- 1956: Ce soir les jupons volent; feature film
- 1957: Miss Catastrophe; feature film

== See also ==
- Avant-garde
- Experimental film
- Independent film
