= Jean Tedesco =

French filmmaker (1895–1958)

- Born: 1895; London
- Died: 1959 (aged 63–64); Paris
- Years active: 1928 - 1951

Jean Tedesco (1895–1958) was a French film director, film critic and screenwriter. Chief editor of the Cinéa magazine he also was managing director of the théâtre du Vieux-Colombier between 1924 and 1934 where he showed avant-garde films during the 1920s.

== Filmography (selection) ==
- 1951 : Napoléon Bonaparte, empereur des Français (documentary)
- 1951 : L'Anglais tel qu'on le parle (after Tristan Bernard) (short film)
- 1951 : Les Hommes de l'acier (short)
- 1948 : Mort ou vif (film) with Charles Dechamps
- 1946 : Comédie avant Molière (short)
- 1945 : Enquête du 58 (short)
- 1943 : La Main de l'homme (documentary)
- 1941 : Sur les chemins de Lamartine (documentary)
- 1937 : Panoramas au fil de l'eau
- 1931 : Amour et quadrille
- 1928 : The Little Match Girl (co director : Jean Renoir)

== Bibliography ==
- Le Cinéma, Jean Tédesco, 1933
