= Jean Bachelet =

French cinematographer

Jean Bachelet (8 November 1894–1977) was a French cinematographer who started as a newsreel cameraman and whose numerous theatrical films include The Rules of the Game (1939) for Jean Renoir.

== Selected filmography ==
- Mandrin (1924)
- The Whirlpool of Fate (1925)
- Nana (1926)
- Marquitta (1927)
- The Little Match Girl (1928)
- The Queen's Necklace (1929)
- Levy and Company (1930)
- Little Lise (1930)
- Abduct Me (1932)
- Companion Wanted (1932)
- Two in a Car (1932)
- Three on a Honeymoon (1932)
- Honeymoon Trip (1933)
- Mademoiselle Josette, My Woman (1933)
- Madame Bovary (1934)
- Cease Firing (1934)
- If I Were Boss (1934)
- Crainquebille (1934)
- The Rosary (1934)
- Fanfare of Love (1935)
- Pasteur (1935)
- Nitchevo (1936)
- The Crime of Monsieur Lange (1936)
- Moutonnet (1936)
- The New Testament (1936)
- The Two Boys (1936)
- Compliments of Mister Flow (1936)
- Désiré (1937)
- The Secrets of the Red Sea (1937)
- Boissière (1937)
- The President (1938)
- Monsieur Coccinelle (1938)
- Durand Jewellers (1938)
- Monsieur Breloque Has Disappeared (1938)
- Berlingot and Company (1939)
- Place de la Concorde (1939)
- The Rules of the Game (1939)
- Portrait of Innocence (1941)
- The Midnight Sun (1943)
- My First Love (1945)
- The Murderer Is Not Guilty (1946)
- Criminal Brigade (1947)
- Loves, Delights and Organs (1947)
- The Ironmaster (1948)
- The Ladies in the Green Hats (1949)
- They Are Twenty (1950)
- La Poison (1951)
- Dirty Hands (1951)
- Boum sur Paris (1953)
- The Virtuous Scoundrel (1953)
