= Charleston Parade =

1927 short film directed by Jean Renoir

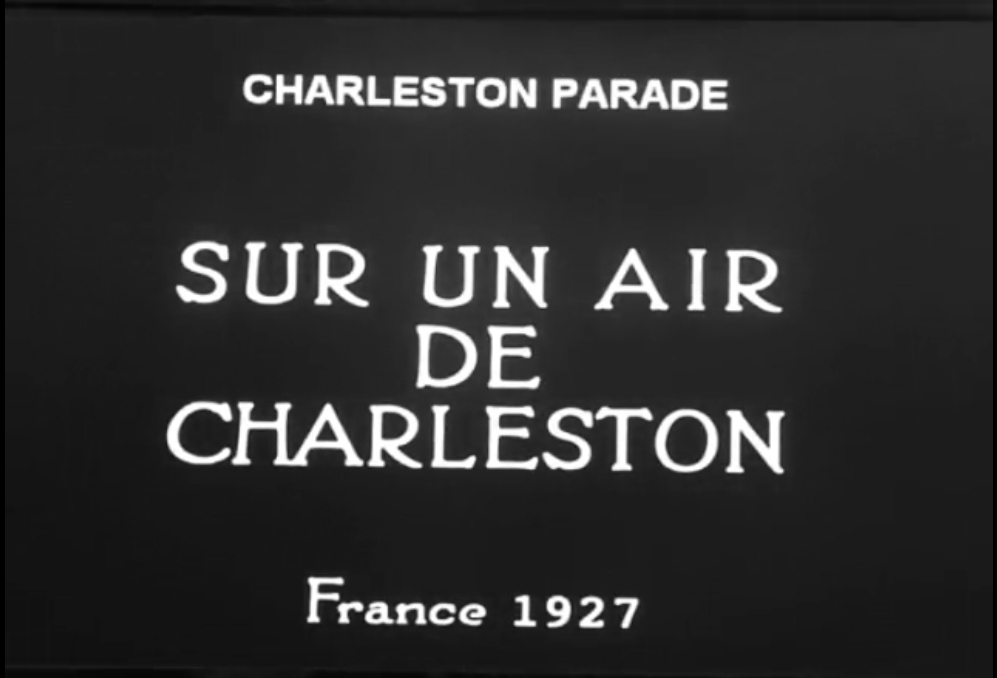
- French: Sur un air de Charleston
- Directed by: Jean Renoir
- Release date: 1927
- Running time: 21 minutes
- Country: France
- Language: Silent

Charleston Parade (Sur un air de Charleston) is a short 1927 futuristic sensual dance fantasy film directed by Jean Renoir, starring Renoir's wife Catherine Hessling and the African American mime artist Johnny Hudgins. Hudgins performs in blackface.

Originally titled Sur un air de Charleston, the film was released as Charleston Parade in English-speaking countries. Renoir would later remark that he directed this avant-garde film because he had "just discovered American jazz." He used some of the leftover footage from his previous film Nana. The film was shot in a three days in the autumn of 1926, but remained unfinished and is rarely shown. The film reverses racial stereotypes and is set in 2028. Censorship boards in some areas of the US and Europe protested against Catherine Hessling's near-nude dance performance. According to Renoir, the film was favourably reviewed by the press, "but this did nothing to open the doors of the popular cinemas."

A restored version of the film was shown at the Grand Lyon Film Festival in 2018.

== Plot ==
In 2028, Europe has been destroyed by a devastating war. An African scientist decides to explore in a flying bubble. Arriving over what remains of Paris, he sets his craft down on the roof of a Morris advertising column, which serves as shelter for a beautiful white aboriginal wild woman, whose only companion is a monkey. When the wild woman discovers that the foreign explorer has arrived, she ties him to the column and performs a sensual ritual dance for him. The prisoner realises that this is a Charleston, the original dance of his people, traces of which have been lost for ages. The white dancer frees the explorer and teaches him to dance. Happily—but to the great despair of the monkey—they both climb into the flying bubble and take off for Africa. And a cardboard box warns us that this is how the dance of the white aborigines entered Africa. (Note: In his memoirs, My Life and My Films, Renoir writes that the explorer comes from another planet, while in the film it is clear that the explorer comes from civilised Africa and leaves for the terra incognita known as France, an empty space on the world map (like large parts of Africa before colonisation by European countries). He also miswrites Hudgin's name as Higgins.)

Stills from Charleston Parade with Catherine Hessling and Johnny Hudgins

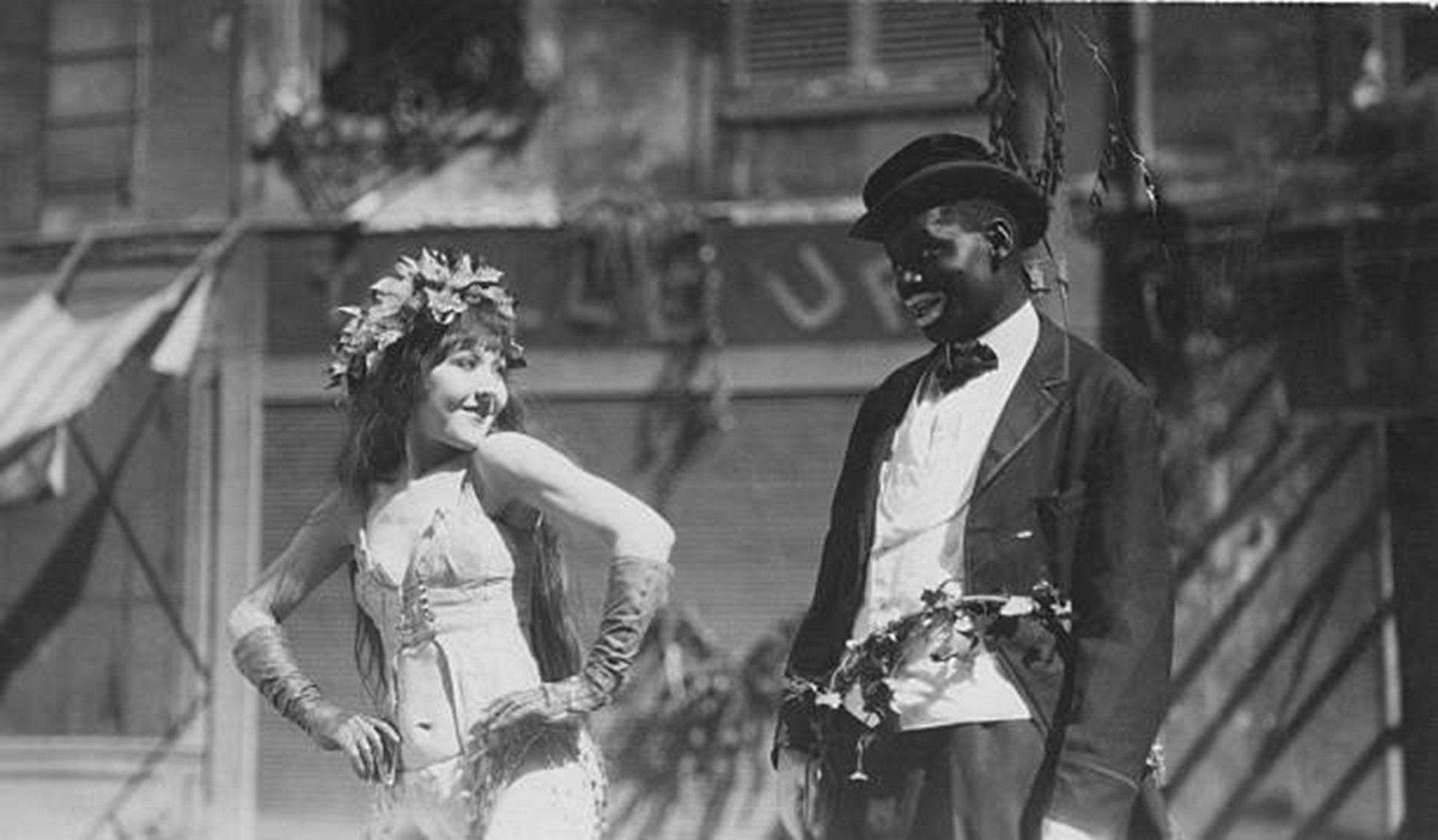

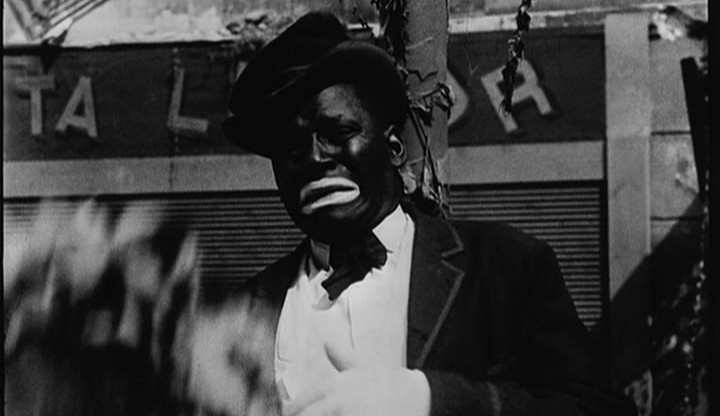

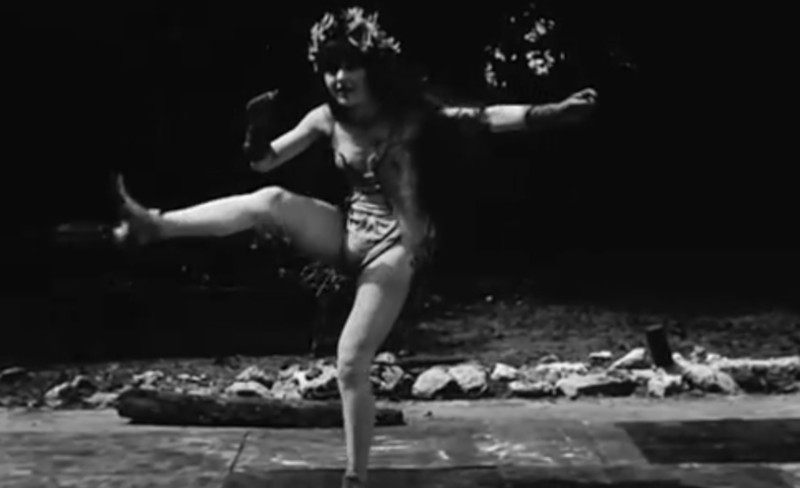

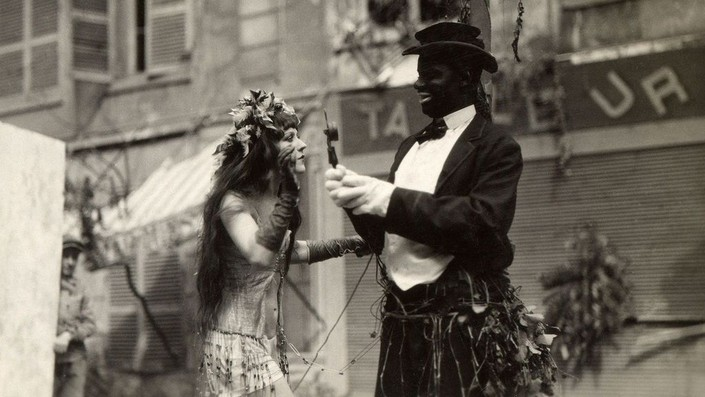

== Cast ==
- Catherine Hessling as Parisian Savage
- Johnny Hudgins as African Explorer
- Pierre Braunberger as Angel
- André Cerf as Angel
- Pierre Lestringuez as Angel
- Jean Renoir as Angel
