= Peace on the Rhine =

1938 film

- Directed by: Jean Choux
- Written by: Emile Fieg; Jacques de Bressac
- Based on: Peace on the Rhine by Pierre Claude
- Produced by: André Labrousse
- Starring: Françoise Rosay; Dita Parlo; John Loder
- Cinematography: Joseph-Louis Mundwiller; Louis Stein; Marcel Villet
- Edited by: Jacques Saint-Léonard
- Music by: Marcel Lattès
- Production company: P.S.R. Production
- Distributed by: Sfera Films
- Release date: 10 November 1938
- Running time: 94 minutes
- Country: France
- Language: French

Peace on the Rhine (French: Paix sur le Rhin) is a 1938 French comedy drama film directed by Jean Choux and starring Françoise Rosay, Dita Parlo and John Loder. The film's sets were designed by the art director Émile Duquesne. It is based on a novel of the same title by Pierre Claude. It was made to coincide with the twentieth anniversary of the Armistice of 1918 and promote reconciliation between France and Germany.

== Synopsis ==
A family from Alsace are deeply divided by the First World War, with one son joining the French Army and another fighting in the German Army. The two brothers return after the war, one married to a German nurse, and ultimately overcome their resentments.

== Cast ==
- Françoise Rosay as Françoise Schaefer
- Dita Parlo as Edwige Schaefer
- John Loder as Émile Schaefer
- Abel Jacquin as Fritz Muller
- Georges Péclet as Édouard Schaefer
- Michèle Alfa as Suzanne Schaefer
- Pauline Carton as Anna - la servante
- Rolla Norman as Le major
- Jean Sinoël as Jean - le vieux domestique
- Thérèse Reignier as Madame Muller
- Jim Gérald as François Grets
- Camille Bert as Le pére Schaefer
- Mariane Asel as Une soeur de Fritz
- Simone Harline as Une soeur de Fritz
- Jeanne Helbling as Marie Grets
- Janine Lozda as La fiancée de Grets
- Eliane Pascal as Une soeur de Fritz

== Bibliography ==
- Bessy, Maurice & Chirat, Raymond. Histoire du cinéma français: 1935-1939. Pygmalion, 1986.
- Crisp, Colin. Genre, Myth and Convention in the French Cinema, 1929-1939. Indiana University Press, 2002.
- Hayward, Susan. French National Cinema. Routledge, 2006.
- Rège, Philippe. Encyclopedia of French Film Directors, Volume 1. Scarecrow Press, 2009.
