= Motherhood (1935 film) =

1935 film

- Directed by: Jean Choux
- Written by: Jean Choux; Laurent Vineuil
- Based on: Motherhood by Laurent Vineuil
- Produced by: Charles-Félix Tavano
- Starring: Françoise Rosay; Félix Oudart; Thérèse Reignier
- Cinematography: Christian Matras
- Music by: Jacques Ibert
- Production companies: Synchro-Ciné; Photosonor
- Distributed by: Héraut Film
- Release date: 19 April 1935
- Running time: 77 minutes
- Country: France
- Language: French

Motherhood (French: Maternité) is a 1935 French drama film directed by Jean Choux and starring Françoise Rosay, Félix Oudart and Thérèse Reignier.

== Synopsis ==
A young peasant and single mother gives up her child Jean to the Duchemins, an older couple who cannot have children, so that he will have the benefits in life she cannot offer him. Jean grows up unaware of the great sacrifice his mother made for him.

== Cast ==
- Françoise Rosay as Mme Duchemin
- Félix Oudart as Monsieur Duchemin
- Hella Müller as Marthe
- Alain as Jean - 4 ans
- Henri Presles as Jean - 20 ans
- Thérèse Reignier
- Odette Talazac
- Jean Lavorel
- Véra Flory

== Bibliography ==
- Martin, John Wiley . The Golden Age of French Cinema, 1929-1939. Twayne, 1983.
- Rège, Philippe. Encyclopedia of French Film Directors, Volume 1. Scarecrow Press, 2009.
