= A Night in Dixie =

1925 film

A Night in Dixie is a Phonofilm musical short film from 1925. Performers in the film include The Club Alabama Revue with Billy Fowler's band with Abbie Mitchell, Jean Starr, and Johnny Hudgins (in blackface). It is part of the Maurice Zouary collection at the Library of Congress. The Cleveland Plain Dealer's television station, WTAM, produced the show with an all-African American cast.

A finale performance from the film is posted to YouTube.

Lee De Forest recorded the show in the early sound on film Phonofilm process used to exhibit short films.
