= Ruth Hanson =

Icelandic dancer, swimmer and film maker

- Born: 20 November 1906
- Occupations: Dancer; Swimmer
- Parents: Hannes Snæbjörnsson Hanson (father); Gerda S. Petersen Hanson (mother)
- Relatives: Rigmor S. Hanson (sister); Aase Johanna Emilia Hanson (sister); Kristmundur B. Hannesson (brother)

Ruth Ester Pearl Hanson was an Icelandic dancer, swimmer and film maker. She is credited with being the first female filmmaker in Iceland for her 1927 dance film made in collaboration with Loftur Guðmundsson.

== Early life ==
Ruth was of Danish descent, the daughter of merchant Hannes Snæbjörnsson Hanson and Gerda Hanson. She studied dance and gymnastics in Denmark before returning to Iceland in 1926. Shortly later she opened a dance school where she taught modern dance. She was a known swimmer and in 1927 she became the first woman, and the third person overall, to swim the Engeyjarsund, a swim route from Engey to Reykjavík.

In 1927, she hired Loftur Guðmundsson, a well known photographer and filmmaker in Iceland, to assist her in making a dancing film where she performed Flat-Charleston with her 14-year-old sister, Rigmor S. Hanson. The film was shown in theaters in December 1927.

== Later life ==
In 1929, Ruth married a Scot and moved to Scotland.
