= Blond Girl with a Rose =

Painting by Pierre-Auguste Renoir

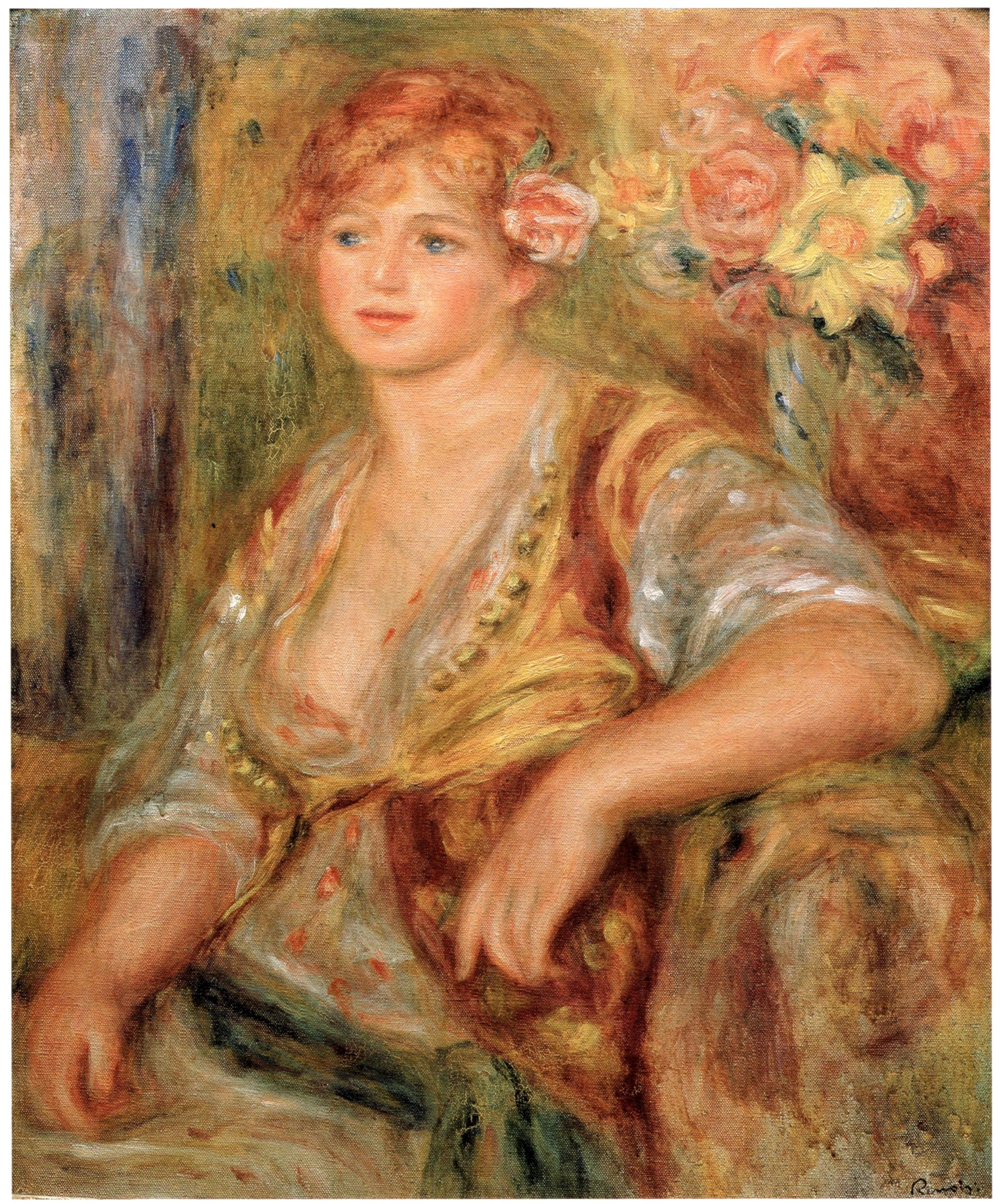
- Artist: Pierre-Auguste Renoir
- Year: 1915–1917
- Medium: oil on canvas
- Dimensions: 64 cm × 54 cm (25 in × 21 in)
- Location: Musée de l'Orangerie, Paris

Blond Girl with a Rose (French: Blonde à la rose) is a late work period (1892–1919) oil painting executed in 1915–1917 by Pierre-Auguste Renoir and held in the collection of the Musée de l'Orangerie, Paris. The painting portrays Renoir's last model, the teenaged Catherine Hessling, who featured in several of his paintings during his final few years. She went on to marry Renoir's second son Jean in 1920 and become a film actress.

Renoir was struck by her flawless young skin and rendered her in soft tones dominated by the colour red. The flower in her hair had by this time became a trademark symbol of Renoir to symbolise beauty.

The painting passed on the artist's death in 1919 to his youngest son Claude, who sold it to art dealer Paul Guillaume in 1929.

== See also ==
- List of paintings by Pierre-Auguste Renoir
