= The Kiss That Kills =

1928 film

- Directed by: Jean Choux
- Written by: Tartarin Malachowski
- Starring: Thérèse Reignier; Georges Oltramare
- Cinematography: Alphonse Gibory; Ganzli Walter
- Production company: Isis-Films
- Release date: 8 June 1928
- Country: France
- Languages: Silent; French intertitles

The Kiss That Kills (French: Le baiser qui tue) is a 1928 French silent drama film directed by Jean Choux and starring Thérèse Reignier and Georges Oltramare. The film's sets were designed by the art director Gaston David.

== Synopsis ==
A French sailor becomes deeply concerned that he has contracted syphilis.

== Cast ==
- Thérèse Reignier
- Claude Harold
- Georges Oltramare
- Pierre Chanot
- Fabien Frachet

== Bibliography ==
- Monaco, Paul. Cinema & Society: France and Germany During the Twenties. Elsevier, 1976.
- Rège, Philippe. Encyclopedia of French Film Directors, Volume 1. Scarecrow Press, 2009.
