= The Dying Land (1927 film) =

1927 film

- Directed by: Jean Choux
- Written by: Jean Choux
- Based on: The Dying Land by René Bazin
- Produced by: Jean Choux
- Starring: Gilbert Dalleu; Madeleine Renaud; Jean Dehelly
- Cinematography: Georges Asselin
- Production company: Étoile-Film
- Distributed by: Super-Films
- Release date: 8 April 1927
- Country: France
- Languages: Silent; French intertitles

The Dying Land (French: La terre qui meurt) is a 1927 French silent drama film directed by Jean Choux and starring Gilbert Dalleu, Madeleine Renaud and Jean Dehelly. It is based on the 1898 novel of the same title by René Bazin which was later remade as a 1936 sound film The Dying Land. Location shooting took place around Sallertaine in the Vendée.

== Cast ==
- Gilbert Dalleu as Le père Toussaint Lumineau
- Madeleine Renaud as Roussille Lumineau
- Jean Dehelly as André Lumineau
- Georges Melchior as François Lumineau
- Robert Thélin as Mathurin Lumineau
- Raymond Destac as Jean Némy
- Thérèse Reignier as Eléonore Lumineau
- Madame Gérard as Félicité Gauvrit

== Bibliography ==
- Goble, Alan. The Complete Index to Literary Sources in Film. Walter de Gruyter, 1999.
- Oscherwitz, Dayna & Higgins, MaryEllen . The A to Z of French Cinema. Scarecrow Press, 2009.
