= The Whirlpool of Fate =

1925 film directed by Jean Renoir

- Directed by: Jean Renoir
- Written by: Pierre Lestringuez
- Produced by: Jean Renoir
- Starring: Catherine Hessling
- Cinematography: Jean Bachelet; Alphonse Gibory
- Production company: Les Films Jean Renoir
- Release date: 20 March 1925
- Running time: 71 minutes
- Country: France
- Languages: Silent; French intertitles

The Whirlpool of Fate (1925) by Jean Renoir

The Whirlpool of Fate or The Girl of the Water (French: La Fille de l'eau) is a 1925 French silent drama film directed by Jean Renoir and starring Catherine Hessling as its heroine.

All of the French copies of this film have been lost but English copies continue to exist with complete copies of the intertitles (albeit in English). The intertitles have been translated back into French so that modern viewers in France can still enjoy the film in a way that is as close as possible to the original as it originally screened.

== Plot ==
In an age of canals and barges, the movie takes place in the late 19th century. The scene opens with the slow progress of a barge making its way down a canal that is lined with oak trees. The heroine's brutish father, a pole man, is somehow knocked off the barge, where he disappears under the serene and still surface of the water. The camera lingers on the water, perhaps to detect a bubble or two rise from below, but nothing can be seen of the pole man's last breath. The death is purely by accident, and although a rescue effort is mounted, his body is not recovered until the next morning.

Reduced to poverty from the loss of her father, the heroine falls back upon her own resources to eke out a simple living by stealing. She happens upon a rogue who has a similar lifestyle, and they join for a few brief acts of criminal mischief, but he is far more abandoned to petty crimes than she is.

A classic case of mistaken identity leads to the heroine being accused of setting fire to a French peasant's haystack. Alarmed, the farmer peasant races to all his neighbors to help put the fire out. A wheeled water wagon is rushed from the village fire station to the scene of the crime, but no one can put out the fire. The peasants think she started the fire, and rush over to her gypsy wagon, and torch it. A macabre fire dance ensues as the locals dance around the burning gypsy wagon, shaking their fists at the wagon, not knowing if someone is inside it.

== Cast ==
- Catherine Hessling as Virginia Rosaert
- Charlotte Clasis as Madame Maubien
- Pierre Champagne as Justin Crepoix
- Maurice Touzé as La Fuine
- Georges Térof as Monsieur Raynal
- Madame Fockenberghe as Madame Raynal
- Harold Levingston as Georges Raynal
- André Derain as Patron du 'Bon Coin'
- Van Doren as Young lover
- Pierre Lestringuez as Jef
- Henriette Moret as La Roussette
- Pierre Renoir as Farmer

== Bibliography ==
- O'Shaughnessy, Martin. Jean Renoir. Manchester University Press, 20 October 2000.
