= Two Friends (short story) =

Short story by Guy de Maupassant

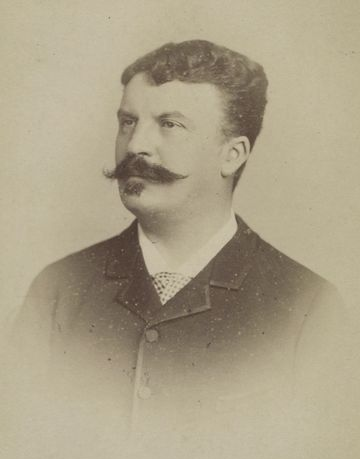
Guy de Maupassant

"Deux amis" or "Two Friends" is a short story by the French author Guy de Maupassant, published in 1883. The story is set in Paris during the Franco-Prussian War, when the city lay under siege. The story examines French bravery, German stereotypes and, unusually for Maupassant, discusses the nature and justification of war in the form of a conversation between the two protagonists.

Algirdas Julien Greimas has famously analysed the text's semiotic features in Maupassant (1976).

== Plot ==
The story opens in Paris in January 1871, at the height of the Siege of Paris, and introduces the main character, Monsieur Morissot, a watchmaker who has enrolled in the National Guard. Morissot, who is bored, hungry and depressed, is walking along the boulevard when by chance he bumps into an old friend, Monsieur Sauvage, a draper from the Rue Notre-Dame-de-Lorette, with whom he used to go fishing before the war. The two old friends reminisce over several glasses of absinthe in a café, gain a laissez-passer from their officer, and walk along the river to Argenteuil, a few miles west of the city, in the no man's land between the French and Prussian lines. The two start fishing and when they see the nearby fortress of Mont-Valérien firing at the Prussians, they start discussing the war, which turns into a friendly debate at the end of which they both agree that the war is a tragedy for both France and Prussia, and that as long as there are governments, there will be wars.

At this point, the two friends turn round to see four Prussian soldiers pointing their rifles at them. The two are captured and taken to a nearby island, where a Prussian officer makes them an offer: he explains that he can legally shoot them on the spot as spies, but that he will spare their lives and let them return to Paris if they give him the password they used to get through their own defense lines. The two heroically refuse to give him the password, even when the officer reminds them that their deaths will cripple their families. Realizing that they will not give him the password, the officer lines up his men into a firing squad. The two friends shake hands and exchange a tearful farewell before they are executed. The German officer orders their bodies thrown into the river, and without showing any sign of emotion, orders a soldier to cook the two friends' fish, and returns to his chair to smoke his pipe.

== Themes ==
Unlike Maupassant's other stories set during the war, "Deux Amis" is set in Paris rather than the provinces, where Maupassant spent the war. The tension between Paris and the provinces is hinted at in the story – Maupassant describes how Paris is starving, but that its inhabitants are simply sitting around drinking, unlike the inhabitants of the provinces who have to put up with the war, and the occupying Germans, on a daily basis.

The two French characters are portrayed heroically as brave, stoic Frenchmen who are bitterly opposed to the war. Maupassant uses the characters as mouthpieces for alternative political views – Monsieur Sauvage complains bitterly that the Third Republic would never have declared war and that the war is the result of Napoleon III's meddling, to which Monsieur Morissot replies that Napoleon's government saw war abroad, while the Republic sees war at home, reflecting the opposing Imperial and Republican political factions of France during the Franco-Prussian War. Maupassant also uses the characters as a mouthpiece for his views on the futility of the war; the characters' sadness on seeing Mont-Valérien shelling German soldiers reflects this, mourning the pointless loss of life in both countries, and that countless girlfriends, wives, mothers, and children in both France and Prussia will weep for the loss of their loved ones in a pointless war.

Despite mourning the loss of Prussian soldiers, Maupassant maintains his stereotyping of German soldiers in this story. While Maupassant is careful to develop the individual characters of Morissot and Sauvage, he portrays the German soldiers who capture the two as faceless men who do not count as individual human beings, but simply as stereotyped representatives of the German race. The officer, like German officers in Maupassant's other works, is portrayed as a cold-hearted, unfeeling automaton. He feels no compassion for the two men he has executed, and seems unable to empathise with them. The fact that he orders the fish to be fried alive, and that he returns calmly to smoking his pipe after the execution, enhances the image of a cold, inhuman barbarian, the antithesis of the heroic Frenchmen who refuse to betray their fellow countrymen, and pay the ultimate price for their patriotism.
