= Destiny (1927 film) =

1927 film

- Directed by: Dimitri Kirsanoff
- Written by: Dimitri Kirsanoff
- Starring: Nadia Sibirskaïa; Guy Belmont; Christenson
- Cinematography: Willy Faktorovitch; Robert Lugeon
- Release date: 1927
- Country: France
- Languages: Silent; French intertitles

Destiny (French: Destin) is a 1927 French silent film directed by Dimitri Kirsanoff and starring Nadia Sibirskaïa, Guy Belmont and Christenson.

== Cast ==
- Nadia Sibirskaïa as Liliane
- Guy Belmont as André Verlin
- Christenson as Le père de Liliane
- A. Stesenko as La fiancée d'André
- Georgette Mussey
- Georges Roland

== Bibliography ==
- Dayna Oscherwitz & MaryEllen Higgins. The A to Z of French Cinema. Scarecrow Press, 2009.
