= Pierre Lestringuez =

French screen writer and film actor (born 1889)

- Pierre Lestringuez in Nana
- Born: 17 October 1889; Levallois-Perret, Hauts-de-Seine, France
- Died: 18 October 1950 (aged 61); Paris, France
- Other name: Louis Pierre Lestringuez
- Occupations: Actor, Screenwriter
- Years active: 1924 - 1950 (film)

Pierre Lestringuez (October 17, 1889 – October 18, 1950) was a French screenwriter and film actor. He wrote the screenplays for several Jean Renoir silent films during the 1920s.

== Biography ==
Lestringuez was born on 17 October 1889 in Levallois-Perret, Seine, France. He was a writer and actor, known for the films Marquitta (1927), Pamela (1945) and The Murdered Model (1948). He died on 18 December 1950 in Paris, France.

== Selected filmography ==
=== Actor ===
- The Whirlpool of Fate (1925)
- Nana (1926)
- Marquitta (1927)

=== Screenwriter ===
- The Whirlpool of Fate (1925)
- Marquitta (1927)
- Latin Quarter (1939)
- Threats (1940)
- Madame Sans-Gêne (1941)
- Romance for Three (1942)
- Home Port (1943)
- Pamela (1945)
- Son of France (1946)
- Clandestine (1946)
- The Murdered Model (1948)
- Monseigneur (1949)
- Women and Brigands (1950)

== Bibliography ==
- O'Shaughnessy, Martin. Jean Renoir. Manchester University Press, 2000.
