= The Most Beautiful Girl in the World (1938 film) =

1938 film

- Directed by: Dimitri Kirsanoff
- Written by: Dimitri Kirsanoff
- Produced by: Christian Stengel; Nino Costantini
- Starring: Véra Flory; Georges Rollin; Nadia Sibirskaïa
- Music by: Charles Borel-Clerc; Arthur Hoérée; Maurice Thiriet
- Production company: Gaumont
- Distributed by: Location Film
- Release date: 3 August 1938
- Running time: 90 minutes
- Country: France
- Language: French

The Most Beautiful Girl in the World (French: La plus belle fille du monde) is a 1938 French comedy film directed by Dimitri Kirsanoff and starring Véra Flory, Georges Rollin and Nadia Sibirskaïa. The film's sets were designed by the art director Lucien Jaquelux.

== Cast ==
- Véra Flory as Geneviève & Mary
- Georges Rollin as Franklin Le Roy
- Nino Constantini as Jacques
- Nadia Sibirskaïa as Une fille
- Pierrette Audry as La sorcière Yaga
- Gaby Ducros as La fille en deuil
- Lyne Lassalle as Ginette
- Janine Darcey as Une midinette
- Léo Mora as Le majordome
- Anthony Gildès as Le président du jury
- Jean Riveyre as Philippe

== Bibliography ==
- Bessy, Maurice & Chirat, Raymond. Histoire du cinéma français: 1935-1939. Pygmalion, 1986.
- Crisp, Colin. Genre, Myth and Convention in the French Cinema, 1929-1939. Indiana University Press, 2002.
- Rège, Philippe. Encyclopedia of French Film Directors, Volume 1. Scarecrow Press, 2009.
