= Nadia Sibirskaïa =

French actress (1901–1980)

- Born: Germaine Marie Josèphe Lebas; 11 September 1901; Redon, Ille-et-Vilaine, French Third Republic
- Died: 14 July 1980 (aged 78); Dinard, Ille-et-Vilaine, France
- Occupation: Actress
- Years active: 1923–1945
- Spouse: Dimitri Kirsanoff (divorced)

Nadia Sibirskaïa (born Germaine Marie Josèphe Lebas, 11 September 1901 – 14 July 1980) was a French film actress. She was married to the Russian-born director Dimitri Kirsanoff and appeared in several of his early films.

== Early life ==
Germaine Lebas was the first child of a couple of shopkeepers from Redon. She had a difficult childhood; her father left home, and her mother did not follow the encouragement of the girl's teacher to send her to the Rennes Lycée. At 18, Germaine left Redon and moved to Paris, where she did odd jobs.

While working as a sweeper at the Théâtre Mogador, she met David Kaplan, a young émigré from Estonia, which was then under the control of Bolshevik forces and the seat of serious political unrest. In Paris, young David, a cellist, was in high demand as a movie theater musician, and the young couple became involved in the world of cinema. Since the artistic world was strongly attracted by Russian culture at the time, David took the name Dimitri Kirsanoff as his screen name and chose the name Nadia Sibirskaïa for Germaine.

== Career ==
Kirsanoff directed an ambitious film, L'ironie du destin (The Irony of Fate), in which Sibirskaïa, then 23 and with no training as an actress, plays a character at all ages of her life, from girlhood through youth to old age. Her performance and natural acting were noted by critics. The second film she shot under the direction of Kirsanoff, Ménilmontant, was very successful. On screen, Sibirskaïa's beauty and expressiveness garnered critical praise and she attracted notice across Europe. She was invited by Gainsborough Pictures to act in a film by Adrian Brunel in London. Three more films directed by Kirsanoff followed.

She was noticed by Julien Duvivier, who gave her the role of Geneviève Baudu in Au Bonheur des Dames in 1930, alongside Dita Parlo; this was her last role in silent cinema. Jean Grémillon then gave her the title role of Little Lise in what was, for both, their first talking film. In 1931, Kirsanoff gave her the lead role in Les Nuits de Port-Saïd alongside German actor Gustav Fröhlich, but production was interrupted in the middle of filming following a dispute between Kirsanoff and the producer, and the film was never finished.

Kirsanoff then embarked on the adaptation of a novel by the Swiss writer Charles Ferdinand Ramuz. The shooting of the film, Rapt (The Kidnapping), took place in 1933 in a village in Valais. Sibirskaïa plays an abandoned fiancée, indirect victim of a conflict between two hostile communities; her ability to express both fragility and suffering attracted the attention of critics and the public. Subsequently, her career suffered because of her reluctance to comply with the codes and social customs of stardom, for example her refusal to call on an impresario. However, she was in demand for brief, but often intense, character roles such as that given her by Léonce Perret in an unusual scene from Sapho, his penultimate film.

It was her meeting with Jean Renoir that offered Sibirskaïa the opportunity for her most memorable appearances on the French screens of the 1930s, with delicate roles well suited to her style and personality. In The Crime of Monsieur Lange she plays Estelle, a sincere young woman overwhelmed by the misfortunes of life, pregnant by an unscrupulous seducer. She has a moving scene in Life Belongs to Us, where she plays the wife of an unemployed engineer who puts himself at the service of the workers' cause. Finally, in La Marseillaise, she plays Louison, a young woman from the Faubourg Saint-Antoine to whom she gives a radiant face in the middle of the revolutionary turmoil.

Kirsanoff called on Sibirskaïa for two more films, the last of which, filmed in 1939, was only released after the war. During the Occupation she went on the stage and, encouraged by Suzy Solidor, she decided to set up a singing tour. This project was canceled at the last minute, and because she was sheltering people living in hiding and waiting for false papers, she was the victim of a denunciation. Arrested by the Gestapo, she was incarcerated for four months in Fresnes Prison.

After the war, Sibirskaïa, with her husband and their daughter, regularly visited the seaside town of Dinard, where she settled permanently in 1960. After her death in 1980 she was buried in the Médréac cemetery, where her tomb bears the simple inscription “NADIA 1980.”

== Filmography ==
Year	Title	Role	Notes
1923	L'ironie du destin		
1926	Ménilmontant	Younger Sister	Short
1927	Blighty	The Little Refugee	
1927	Destiny	Liliane	
1929	Sables		
1929	Brumes d'automne		Short
1930	Au bonheur des dames	Geneviève Baudu	
1930	Little Lise	Lise Berthier	
1931	Les vagabonds magnifiques	Édith	
1932	Nights in Port Said		
1934	L'empreinte sanglante		
1934	Sapho	La fille	
1934	Rapt	Jeanne	
1934	Jeanne	La jeune fille	
1934	Dédé	La môme	
1935	Mysteries of Paris	Madame Mont Saint-Jean	
1936	The Crime of Monsieur Lange	Estelle	
1936	Life Belongs to Us	Ninette - l'amie de René	
1936	Girls of Paris	Andrée Maubert	
1937	Franco de port	Nana	
1938	La Marseillaise	Louison	
1938	The Most Beautiful Girl in the World	Une fille	
1939	Quartier sans soleil	La mère du bébé	

== Bibliography ==
- Aaron Sultanik. Film, a Modern Art. Associated University Presses, 1986.
- Pierre Guérin. "SIBIRSKAÏA Nadia." Archives n°n° 34-35, Oct. 1990.
