= Jean Choux =

Swiss film director

- Born: 6 March 1887; Geneva, Switzerland
- Died: 6 March 1946 (aged 59); Paris, France
- Occupations: Director, Screenwriter
- Years active: 1925–1946 (film)

Jean Choux (1887–1946) was a French-Swiss film director, screenwriter and producer born in Geneva. He was active in French and Italian cinema from the silent era until his death in 1946.

== Filmography ==
- The Vocation of André Carel (1925)
- The Dying Land (1927)
- The Kiss That Kills (1928)
- Espionage (1929)
- Chacun porte sa croix (1929)
- La servante (1929)
- Amours viennoises (1930)
- Jean de la Lune (1931)
- A Dog That Pays Off (1932)
- The Marriage of Mademoiselle Beulemans (1932)
- The Guardian Angel (1934)
- La Banque Nemo (1934)
- Le Greluchon délicat (1934)
- Motherhood (1935)
- Paris (1936)
- A Woman of No Importance (1937)
- La Glu (1937)
- Miarka (1937)
- Café du port (1938)
- Peace on the Rhine (1938)
- Rose de sang (1939)
- Angelica (1939)
- The Birth of Salome (1940)
- The Lost Woman (1942)
- Home Port (1943)
- Box of Dreams (1945)
- The Angel They Gave Me (1946)
