= Ménilmontant (1926 film) =

1926 film by Dimitri Kirsanoff

- Directed by: Dimitri Kirsanoff
- Written by: Dimitri Kirsanoff
- Produced by: Dimitri Kirsanoff
- Starring: Nadia Sibirskaïa; Yolande Beaulieu; Guy Belmont; Jean Pasquier
- Cinematography: Léonce Crouan; Dimitri Kirsanoff
- Music by: Lev Shvarts
- Release date: 1926
- Running time: 38 minutes
- Country: France
- Languages: Silent film no intertitles

Ménilmontant (pronounced [menilmɔ̃tɑ̃]) is a 1926 film written and directed by Dimitri Kirsanoff that takes its name from the Paris neighborhood of the same name.

== Summary ==
The film is silent and contains no intertitles. It begins with a flurry of quick shots depicting the axe murder of the parents of the protagonists, two sisters. As young women, they are portrayed by Nadia Sibirskaïa, Kirsanoff's first wife, and Yolande Beaulieu; their mutual love interest is played by Guy Belmont.

== Style ==
Like many French silent avant-garde films, Ménilmontant uses a mixture of styles and techniques. The film also uses many techniques that were current at the time, including double exposure. The true achievement in the film, however, is in its radical editing, less ideological than the Soviet Russian films of the time, but equally powerful in its emotional effects.

== Reception ==
Film critic Pauline Kael wrote that Ménilmontant was her favorite film of all time.
