= Marquitta =

1927 film directed by Jean Renoir

- Directed by: Jean Renoir
- Written by: Pierre Lestringuez; Jean Renoir
- Produced by: André Gargour
- Starring: Jean Angelo; Marie-Louise Iribe; Henri Debain
- Cinematography: Raymond Agnel; Jean Bachelet
- Edited by: Jean Renoir
- Production company: Les Artistes Réunis
- Distributed by: Exclusivités Jean de Merly
- Release date: 12 August 1927
- Running time: 70 minutes
- Country: France
- Languages: Silent; French intertitles

Marquitta is a 1927 French silent drama film directed by Jean Renoir and starring Jean Angelo, Marie-Louise Iribe and Henri Debain.

The film's sets were designed by the art director Robert-Jules Garnier. It was shot at the Gaumont studios in Paris and on location in Nice.

== Cast ==
- Jean Angelo as Prince Vlasco
- Marie-Louise Iribe as Marquitta
- Henri Debain as Dimitrieff
- Félix d'Aps as Granval
- Simone Cerdan as Jeune femme
- Andrée Vernon
- Lucien Mancini as Père adoptif
- Pierre Lestringuez as Directeur du casino
- Pierre Champagne as Chauffeur de taxi

== Bibliography ==
- Martin O'Shaughnessy. Jean Renoir. Manchester University Press, 2000.
