= Nana (1926 film) =

1926 film directed by Jean Renoir

- Directed by: Jean Renoir
- Written by: Pierre Lestringuez; Jean Renoir; Émile Zola (novel)
- Produced by: Pierre Braunberger
- Starring: Catherine Hessling; Werner Krauss; Jean Angelo
- Cinematography: Jean Bachelet; Edmund Corwin
- Edited by: Jean Renoir
- Music by: Maurice Jaubert
- Production company: Les Films Jean Renoir
- Distributed by: Les Établissements Braunberger-Richebé
- Release date: 25 June 1926
- Running time: 150 minutes
- Country: France
- Language: French

Nana is a 1926 French silent drama film directed by Jean Renoir and starring Catherine Hessling, Werner Krauss and Jean Angelo. It was Renoir's second full-length film and is based on the 1880 novel by Émile Zola.

It was shot at the Bavaria Studios in Munich and the Neuilly Studios in Paris. The film's sets were designed by the art director Claude Autant-Lara.

== Plot ==
Nana (1926)

The story takes place during the Second Empire in France. Nana, a theatre actress, puts on light-hearted plays that the Parisian bourgeoisie come to see. Thanks to her success with men, she becomes a rich and adored courtesan, so much so that she leaves the stage and is maintained. One young man even commits suicide to keep Nana's favour. The Count of Muffat becomes the man who ruins himself to support her and satisfy her excessive needs. Nana cheats on him and wastes his money on the grandiose parties she organises. One day, driven by her desire to perform, she returns to the stage. Some time later, she contracts smallpox and dies.

== Cast ==
- Catherine Hessling as Nana
- Werner Krauss as Count Muffat
- Jean Angelo as Count de Vandeuvres
- Raymond Guérin-Catelain as Georges Hugon
- Pierre Lestringuez as Bordenave
- Jacqueline Forzane as La Comtesse Sabine Muffat
- Claude Autant-Lara as Fauchery
- Pierre Champagne as Hector de la Faloise
- Karl Harbacher as Francis - le coiffeur
- Valeska Gert as Zoe - la femme de chambre
- Jacqueline Ford as Rose Mignon
- Dennis Price as Le jockey de 'Nana'
- Gresham as Le jockey de 'Lusignan'
- Luc Dartagnan as Maréchal - le bookmaker
- Nita Romani as Satin
- Roberto Pla as Bosc
- Gorieux as Le médecin

== Production ==
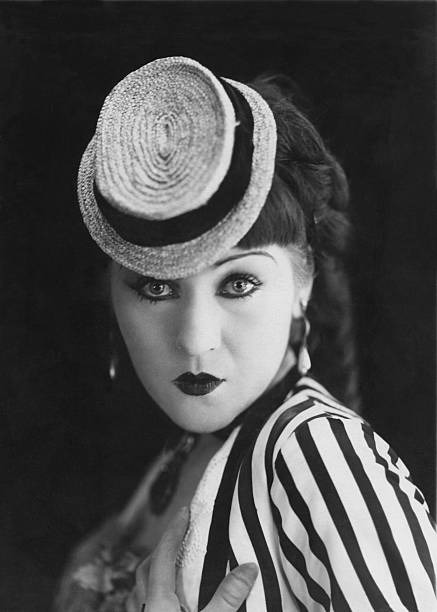
Catherine Hessling as Nana

The film stars Renoir's wife, Catherine Hessling, in an eccentric performance as the flawed heroine Nana.

Jean Renoir's film is a somewhat truncated adaptation of Émile Zola's classic novel. The film's extravagances include two magnificent set pieces – a horse race and an open air ball. The film never made a profit, and the commercial failure of the film robbed Renoir of the opportunity to make such an ambitious film again for several years.

In his memoir, My Life and My Films, Renoir writes that Nana was a frenzied undertaking with a budget of one million francs, not counting the German contribution, which was huge at the time. He was convinced that the film could hardly fail from a commercial point of view and that Nana would be his way to break the barrier of commercial cinema. Nana got a tremendous world premiere that he had prepared with a torrent of publicity. The walls of Paris were covered with posters of Catherine Hessling and the press announced the event with a fanfare of trumpets. The main hall of the Moulin Rouge was hired, along with the excellent orchestra. The film ran to the accompaniment of whistles and shouts, interspersed with bursts of hearty applause. People took sides and scolded each other. Commercially, however, Nana was a failure and Renoir lost a million francs. "Nana won a few supporters for Catherine Hessling and perhaps for myself, but the larger public would have none of it, and the trade still less," he recalled. Renoir was forced to sell almost all of the paintings his father, Pierre-Auguste Renoir, had left him, to pay off his debts.
