= The Little Match Girl (1928 film) =

1928 film directed by Jean Renoir

- Directed by: Jean Renoir
- Written by: Hans Christian Andersen; Jean Renoir
- Produced by: Jean Tedesco; Jean Renoir
- Starring: Catherine Hessling; Eric Barclay
- Cinematography: Jean Bachelet
- Edited by: Jean Renoir
- Distributed by: La Société des Films Artistiques (SOFAR)
- Release date: 8 June 1928
- Running time: 34 minutes
- Country: France
- Languages: Silent film French intertitles

The Little Match Girl (French: La petite marchande d'allumettes) is a 1928 French drama featurette film directed by Jean Renoir and starring Catherine Hessling.

== Plot ==
The Little Match Girl (1928)

A young woman stands on a corner on New Year's Eve, trying to sell matchsticks. She is ignored by most passers by, except a young man who nearly approaches her before being called to a table in a restaurant. She doesn't notice the man until he is inside, eating. She gazes longingly at his food. A group of children pelt her with snowballs.

A policeman passes by and admonishes her for being outside with poor shoes. Rather than go home empty-handed, the girl crouches in a corner for warmth. Soon, she begins to hallucinate, imagining herself stepping into the toy display in the window next to her. She envisions herself and the young man from the diner being pursued through the toyland by a pirate embodying death. Eventually, he catches them both. The young woman dies in her vision and is draped on a hilltop near a cross. White flower petals fall on her face.

The film shifts back to reality and we see that the flower petals are really snow. An old woman finds her dead body in the snow.

The film is based on the 1845 short story of the same name by Hans Christian Andersen.

== Cast ==
- Catherine Hessling as Karen
- Amy Wells as Pop
- Jean Storm as Lieutenant Axel Ott
- Manuel Raaby as Policeman
- Lucia Joyce as toy soldier dancer (uncredited)

== See also ==
- List of Christmas films
