= Catherine Hessling =

French actress (1900–1979)

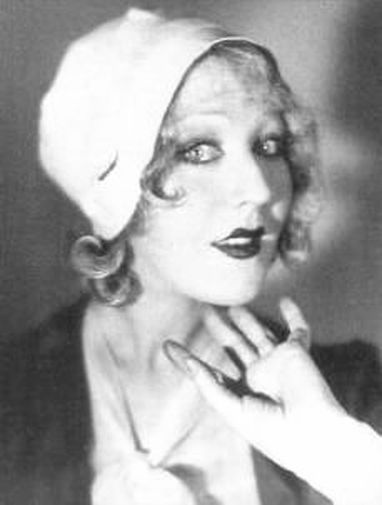
- Hessling in 1925
- Born: Andrée Madeleine Heuschling; 22 June 1900; Pontfaverger-Moronvilliers, Marne, France
- Died: 28 September 1979 (aged 79); La Celle-Saint-Cloud, Yvelines, France
- Occupation: Actress
- Years active: 1924–1935
- Spouse: Jean Renoir (m. 1920; div. 1943)

Catherine Hessling (born Andrée Madeleine Heuschling; 22 June 1900 – 28 September 1979) was a French actress and the first wife of film director Jean Renoir. Hessling appeared in 15, mostly silent, films before retiring from the acting profession and withdrawing from public life in the mid-1930s.

== Biography ==
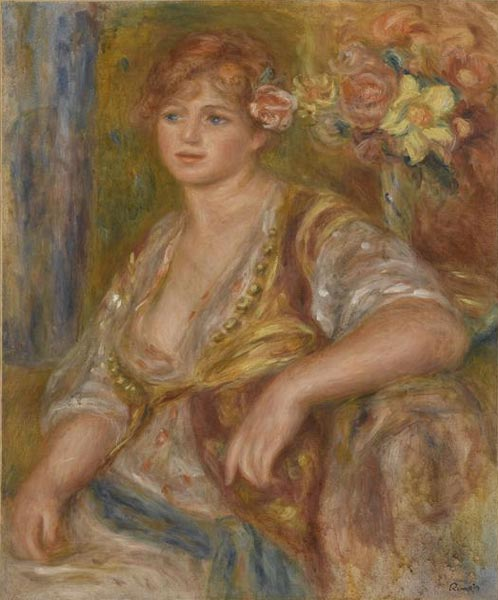
Blonde à la rose, Hessling painted by Renoir, 1915-17

Hessling, born in Champagne-Ardennes, had sought refuge in Nice during World War I. Her paternal ancestors came from Alsace but moved to Champagne-Ardennes when Alsace transferred to Germany. In 1917, her beauty came to the attention of Henri Matisse, who sent her to fellow artist Pierre-Auguste Renoir as he thought she looked like a suitable Renoir subject. Hessling modelled, clothed and nude, for Renoir until his death in December 1919. Renoir's second son, Jean, fell in love with Hessling, and the couple married on 24 January 1920. Hessling gave birth to a son, Alain Renoir, on 31 October 1921.

Jean Renoir had been planning a career in ceramic art but decided instead to try his hand in the medium of film in the attempt, he would later claim, to make Hessling a star. While both were aficionados of American films, and Hessling copied fashions and behaviour she saw on the screen, she had in fact never had any thought or ambition to become an actress herself.

Renoir produced his first script, Catherine, in 1924. Albert Dieudonné would direct the film. Renoir devised for Hessling a very stark, exaggerated look, with the mouth and eyes a penetrating black against white facial make-up, which was again used in his first full-length film The Whirlpool of Fate, and the lavish and costly adaptation of Émile Zola's Nana (1926), in which Hessling's performance has been described as characteristically stylised and unsubtle, yet appropriate for this role.

Hessling appeared in three more Renoir films before the couple separated in 1931. It was rumoured that she had expected to play the role of Lulu in Renoir's sound film La Chienne and felt betrayed when the film's producers insisted on, and Renoir agreed to, another actress (Janie Marèse) in the role. Following the couple's separation (the divorce was not finalised until 1943), Hessling appeared in minor roles in three sound films and had a brief career as a dancer before abandoning show business completely. She lived the rest of her life out of the public eye.

Hessling died in suburban Paris on 28 September 1979, aged 79. Jean Renoir had died in California earlier the same year.

Hessling was played by Christa Théret in the 2012 film Renoir. Set in 1915, the film depicts Hessling's association with Pierre-Auguste Renoir and the beginning of her romantic relationship with Jean Renoir.

== Filmography ==
Year	Title	Role	Director
1924	Catherine ou Une vie sans Joie		Albert Dieudonné
1925	The Whirlpool of Fate	Virginia Rosaert	Jean Renoir
1926	Nana	Nana	Jean Renoir
1927	Sur un air de Charleston	Catherine Férand	Jean Renoir
1927	La P'tite Lili		Alberto Cavalcanti
1927	En rade		Alberto Cavalcanti
1928	La Petite Marchande d'allumettes	Karen	Jean Renoir
1928	Tire-au-flanc	L'institutrice	Jean Renoir
1928	Yvette	Yvette Obardi	Alberto Cavalcanti
1929	Vous verrez la semaine prochaine		Alberto Cavalcanti
1930	Le Petit Chaperon rouge	Little Red Riding Hood	Alberto Cavalcanti
1930	Die Jagd nach dem Glück	Catherine	Rochus Gliese; Carl Koch; Lotte Reiniger
1933	Du haut en bas	Mademoiselle Paula	Georg Wilhelm Pabst
1934	Coralie and Company	Liane	Alberto Cavalcanti
1935	Crime et châtiment	Elisabeth	Pierre Chenal
