= Sisters in Arms (1937 film) =

1937 film

- Directed by: Léon Poirier
- Written by: Léon Poirier; Antoine Redier
- Produced by: Léon Poirier
- Starring: Jeanne Sully; Josette Day; Thomy Bourdelle
- Cinematography: Georges Million
- Edited by: Jacques Grassi
- Music by: Claude Delvincourt
- Production company: Societé Artistique Commerciale et Industrielle
- Distributed by: Comptoir Français du Film Documentaire
- Release date: 2 December 1937
- Running time: 125 minutes
- Country: France
- Language: French

Sisters in Arms (French: Soeurs d'armes) is a 1937 French spy drama film directed by Léon Poirier and starring Jeanne Sully, Josette Day and Thomy Bourdelle. The film's sets were designed by the art directors Raymond Druart and Hugues Laurent.

== Synopsis ==
During the First World War Louise de Bettignies and Léonie Vanhoutte form an underground intelligence operation in German-occupied Belgium and Northern France in conjunction with British military intelligence.

== Cast ==
- Jeanne Sully as Louise de Bettignies
- Josette Day as Léonie Vanhoutte
- Thomy Bourdelle as Le juge Goldschmidt
- André Nox as Le prêtre
- Jeanne Marie-Laurent as Madame Vanhoutte
- Camille Bert as Stoeber
- Gaston Dupray as Monsieur Lamote
- Henriette Dupray as Madame Pandelaers

== Bibliography ==
- Bessy, Maurice & Chirat, Raymond. Histoire du cinéma français: 1935-1939. Pygmalion, 1986.
- Drazin, Charles . The Faber Book of French Cinema. London: Faber & Faber, 2011.
- Hayward, Susan. French National Cinema. Routledge, 2004.
- Crisp, Colin. Genre, Myth and Convention in the French Cinema, 1929-1939. Indiana University Press, 2002.
- Rège, Philippe. Encyclopedia of French Film Directors, Volume 1. Scarecrow Press, 2009.
- Welch, David. Nazi Propaganda: The Power and the Limitations. Routledge, 2014.
