= Antoine Rédier =

French writer

Antoine Redier
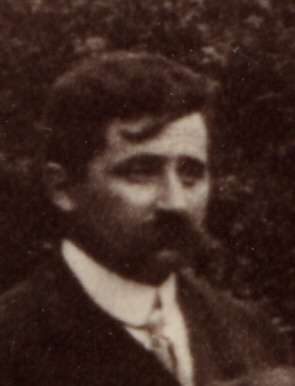
- Antoine Redier in 1912
- Born: 7 July 1873; Meudon, France
- Died: 27 July 1954 (aged 81); Paris, France
- Occupation: Writer
- Known for: Le Légion
- Spouse: Marie Léonie Vanhoutte (m. 1934–1954; death)

Antoine Redier (7 July 1873 – 27 July 1954) was a French writer who was leader of the far-right Légion organization in the 1920s.

== Early years ==
Antoine Redier was born on 7 July 1873 in Meudon, the eldest of eight children of Jean Redier and his wife Anna Thubert. He was grandson of the watchmaker Jean Antoine Joseph Redier. He wrote many books, including Méditations dans la tranchée (1916), which won an awards from the Académie française.

After World War I, Redier became the leader of a veterans group, and was the editor of the Revue française. He was nationalist, anti-communist and socially conservative. He believed in the virtues of a family unit headed by a patriarch, and generally believed in the virtues of anti-Republican virility. He supported the proposals of Fernand Boverat for family suffrage, which would enhance the status of the father in the family.

== Political career ==
Redier founded the Légion, or Ligue, in 1924. Although the goals were obscure, Redier expected that the veterans would take power, and a leader (chef) would emerge. The ligue had 10,000 members, with sections in the main provincial centers. From 15,000 to 20,000 copies of the movement's newspaper, Le Rassemblement. were printed each week. The Légion was in favor of a corporatist system of government and attacked the left and democracy. Its program said it stood "above the interests of a single group" and would "gather all those ... who put the salvation of France above all else." General Édouard de Curières de Castelnau, President of the Fédération Nationale Catholique provided funding to Rédier's Légion and to the Jeunesses Patriotes founded by Pierre Taittinger.

The Légion merged into the Jeunesses Patriotes on 1 July 1925, bringing a more extreme element into Taittinger's vaguely right-wing organization. Redier became vice-president of the merged organization, and began to radicalize the organization. When Georges Valois launched his rival Faisceau organization, Redier was in favor of a merger. Large numbers of Ligue members did desert to the Faisceau. By 15 December Redier had left the Jeunesses patriotes, and urged all Légion members to follow his lead. He intended to transfer to the Faisceau, but held back, perhaps because of an ongoing struggle between Fasceau and the Action Française. In March 1926 Redier again called for his remaining followers to join Faisceau, before retiring from politics after Faisceau promised to support his career as a writer.

== Later years ==
Redier continued to be a prolific author, although his work was not exceptional. His book La Guerre des femmes (1923) had won an award from the Academy. This book, which recorded the lives of women fighters such as Louise de Bettignies, was the basis for the 1937 film Sisters in Arms by Léon Poirier. The role of Louise was played by Jeanne Sully. His Jeanne de France (1950) also won an award from the Academy.

Redier married French World War II spy Marie Léonie Vanhoutte on 19 July 1934 in Paris. Attendees at their wedding included Maxim Weygand, André Tardieu, and Henri Gouraud.

Redier died on 27 July 1954 in Paris.

== Bibliography ==
- Redier, Antoine (1916). Méditations dans la tranchée. Payot et Cie. (Essay)
- Redier, Antoine (1917). Pierrette. Payot. (novel)
- Redier, Antoine (1918). Le Mariage de Lison, à l'usage des combattants et des jeunes filles sans dot. Payot. (novel)
- Redier, Antoine; Weygand, Maxime (1919). Le capitaine: Dialogue sur le commandement. I.A.C. (essays)
- Redier, Antoine (1920). Léone: roman. Payot. (novel)
- Redier, Antoine (1922). La Charité féminine pendant la guerre: Geneviève Hennet de Goutel.
- Redier, Antoine (1923). La Guerre des femmes: histoire de Louise de Bettignies et de des compagnes. Editions de la vraie france.
- Redier, Antoine (1925). Comme disait Monsieur de Tocqueville ... Perrin. (Essay)
- Redier, Antoine (1923). Les Nouveaux patriarches, discours prononcé au 4e Congrès de la natalité à Tours, le 21 septembre 1922. Éditions de "la Revue française.
- Redier, Antoine (1926). Louise de Bettignies: héroïne de guerre. Éditions Spes. (biography)
- Redier, Antoine (1926). The story of Louise de Bettignies. Hutchinson. (biography)
- Redier, Antoine (1927). La vraie vie de Saint Vincent de Paul. Bernard Grasset. (biography)
- Redier, Antoine (1927). Mes garçons et vos filles: discussion sur l'éducation. Grasset. (essay))
- Redier, Antoine (1928). Antigone. (novel)
- Redier, Antoine (1930). Zita: princesse de la Paix: L'histoire de Zita de Bourbon Parme. Alexis Redier. (biography)
- Redier, Antoine (1932). Ce qu'on appelle le monde: essai sur les mœurs du temps présent. La Revue française. (essay)
- Rabourdin, Elie; Redier, Antoine (1932). Marchand de sable. Alexis Redier.
- Redier, Antoine (1933). L'évêques des anthropophages. A. Redier. (biography)
- Redier, Antoine (1934). La tragédie du Danube: Schoenbrunn ou Potsdam. Librairie de la Revue française. (essay)
- Redier, Antoine (1935). L'Angoisse des filles. Plon. (novel)
- Redier, Antoine (1935). Hélène Boucher, jeune fille française: préface du général Victor Denain, ministre de l'Air. E. Flammarion. (biography)
- Redier, Antoine (1936). Garçons d'aujourd'hui. Les Radios. E. Flammarion.
- Gaillard, Jean; Redier, Antoine (1936). Pour comprendre les autres. Paillard.
- Redier, Antoine (1937). Les Allemands dans nos maisons. Cartier (Impr. commerciale).
- Redier, Antoine; Hénocque, G. (1940). Les aumôniers militaires français, 496-1939: Les prêtres chez les soldats depuis Tolbiac. E. Flammarion.
- Redier, Antoine (1940). Les cadets de Saumur. E. Vitte.
- Redier, Antoine; Saussine, Bertrand de (1942). Un Marin de Légende, Bertrand de Saussine. Emmanuel Vitte.
- Venel, Henri de; Redier, Antoine (1942). La France renaissante. Au Pigeonnier.
- Camus-Marzin, Louise; Redier, Antoine (1948). Marie l'Huillier de Villeneuve: fondatrice des filles de la Croix (1597-1650). Ed. Xavier Mappus.
- Boca, Robert; Redier, Antoine (1949). Les Vallée, leurs enfants, leurs alliés: 1914-1919, 1939-1945. Documentation recueillie par Robert Boca,... Préface d'Antoine Redier. Châtelaudren.
- Redier, Antoine (1950). Les Beaux jours reviendront. Éditions Alsatia (Impr. Alsatia).
- Redier, Antoine (1950). Jeanne de France. X. Mappus.
- Redier, Antoine (1954). Debout les vivants!: Nos morts d'Indochine et de Corée vous parlent. Nouvelles Editions Latines. p. 4. ISBN 978-2-7233-1044-4.

== Sources ==
- Berman, Sheri (2006). The Primacy of Politics: Social Democracy and the Making of Europe's Twentieth Century (PDF). Cambridge University Press. ISBN 978-0-511-24231-1.
- Douglas, Allen (1992). From Fascism to Libertarian Communism: Georges Valois Against the Third Republic. University of California Press. p. 101. ISBN 978-0-520-91209-0.
- Šṭernhel, Zeev (1996). Neither Right Nor Left: Fascist Ideology in France. Princeton University Press. p. 103. ISBN 978-0-691-00629-1.
- Stromberg Childers, Kristen (2003-01-01). Fathers, Families, and the State in France, 1914-1945. Cornell University Press. p. 208. ISBN 978-0-8014-4122-6.
- Tallett, Frank (1996-07-01). Catholicism in Britain & France Since 1789. Continuum. ISBN 978-0-8264-4136-2.
- Trévisi, Marion; Nivet, Philippe (2010). Les femmes et la guerre de l'antiquité à 1918: actes du colloque d'Amiens, 15-16 novembre 2007. Economica. ISBN 978-2-7178-5951-5.
