= Jean Mounet-Sully =

French actor (1841–1916)

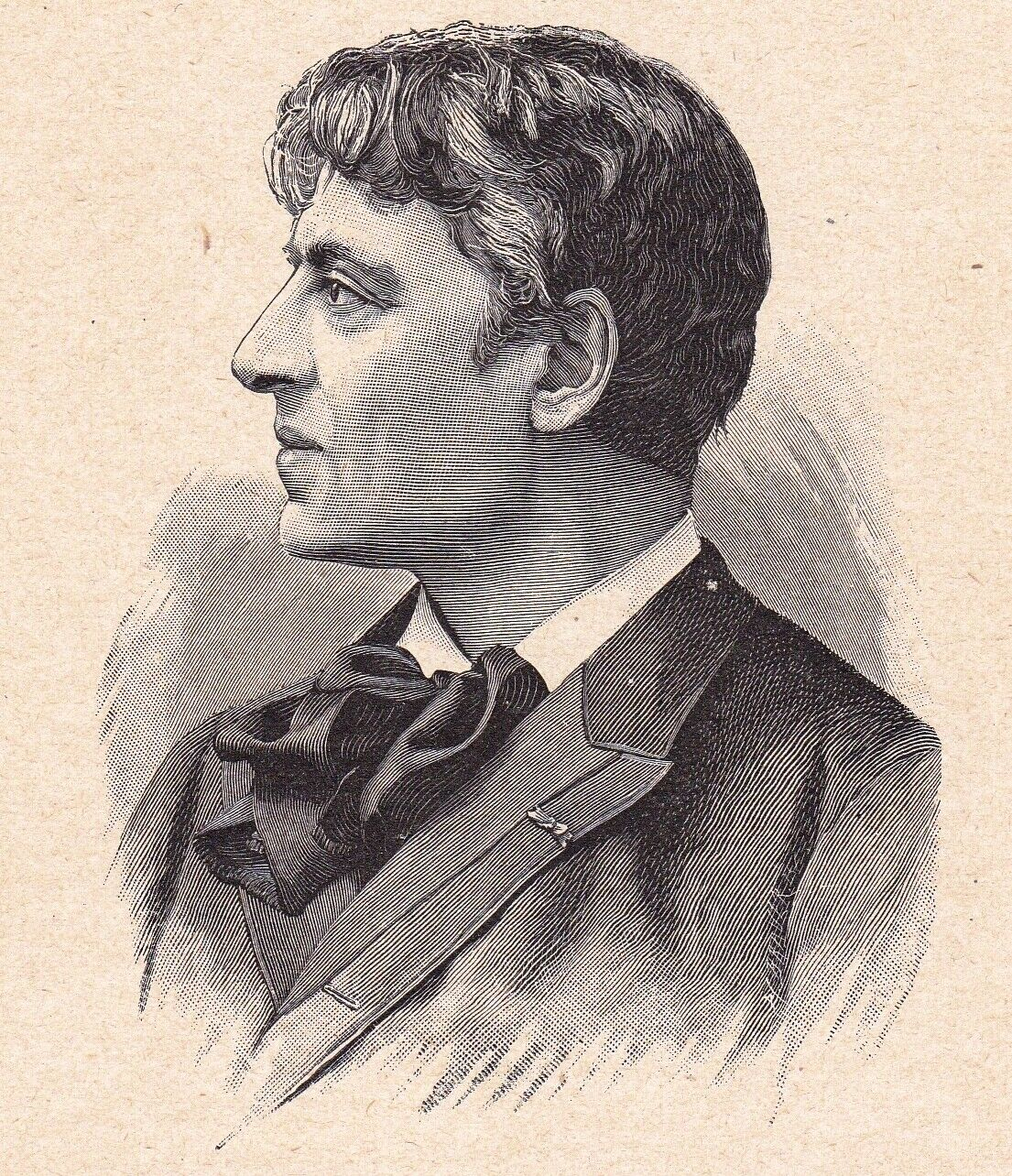
Jean Mounet-Sully

Mounet-Sully (Pathé Baby), 1916.

Mounet-Sully (28 February 1841 – 3 March 1916), a French actor, was born at Bergerac. His birth name was Jean-Sully Mounet: "Mounet-Sully" (without the "Jean") was a stage name.

== Life ==
He entered the Conservatoire at the age of twenty-one, where he took first prize for tragedy. In 1868 he made his debut at the Odéon without attracting much attention. His career was interrupted by the Franco-Prussian War, and his passion for his military career had almost convinced him to give up the stage, until he was offered the opportunity to play the part of Oreste in Racine's Andromaque at the Comédie Française in 1872.

His striking presence and voice and the passionate vigor of his acting made an immediate impression, which resulted in his election as sociétaire in 1874. He became one of the mainstays of the Comédie Française, and distinguished himself in a great variety of tragic and romantic parts.

Perhaps his most famous role was that of Oedipus in L'Oedipe roi, a French version by Jules Lacroix of Sophocles's drama. This was first performed in Paris at the Théâtre-Français in 1881 and later revived in the old Roman amphitheater at Orange, Vaucluse in 1888. Fashion designer Paul Poiret commented in his autobiography King of Fashion, "I shall always see Mounet-Sully in Oedipus Rex, blind, coming down the steps of the temple, and saying in a suave voice: 'Children of ancient Cadmus, young successors. . .' Other prominent parts in Mounet-Sully's repertoire were Achilles in Racine's Iphigenie et Aulide, Hippolyte in Phèdre, the titular part of Hamlet, the title parts in Victor Hugo's Hernani and Ruy Blas, Francis I in Le roi s'amuse, and Didier in Marion Delorme.

He was made chevalier of the Legion of Honour in 1889. He also wrote a play, La Buveuse de l'armes, and in 1906, in collaboration with Pierre Barbier, La Vieillesse de Don Juan in verse.

He was the brother of the actor Paul Mounet. His daughter was the actress Jeanne Sully. He was a good friend, co-performer, and one-time lover of famed actress Sarah Bernhardt.

Mounet-Sully died in Paris on 3 March 1916.

== Gallery ==
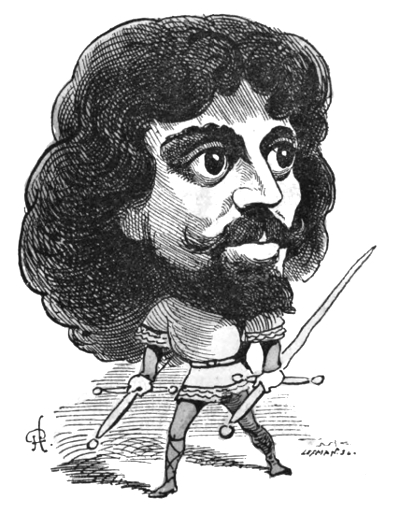
Mounet-Sully by Georges Lafosse from Le Trombinoscope

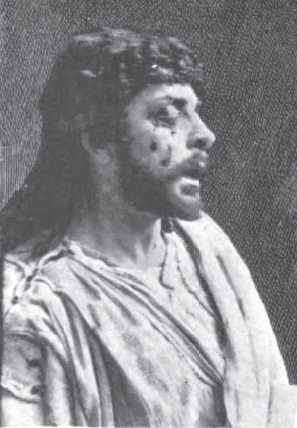
Mounet-Sully as Oedipus

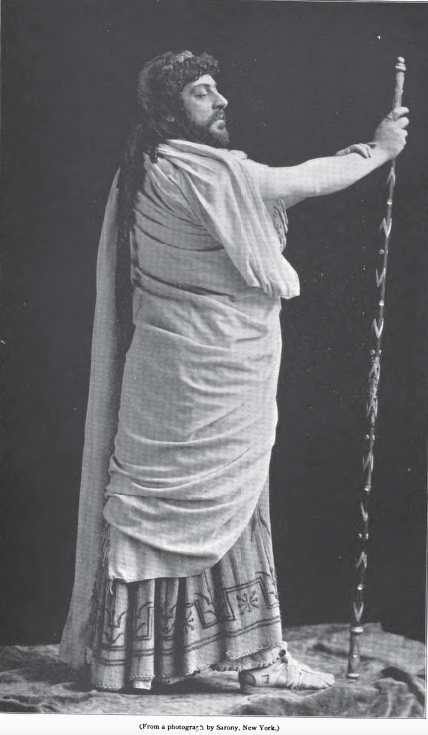
Mounet-Sully in an unknown role, c 1896

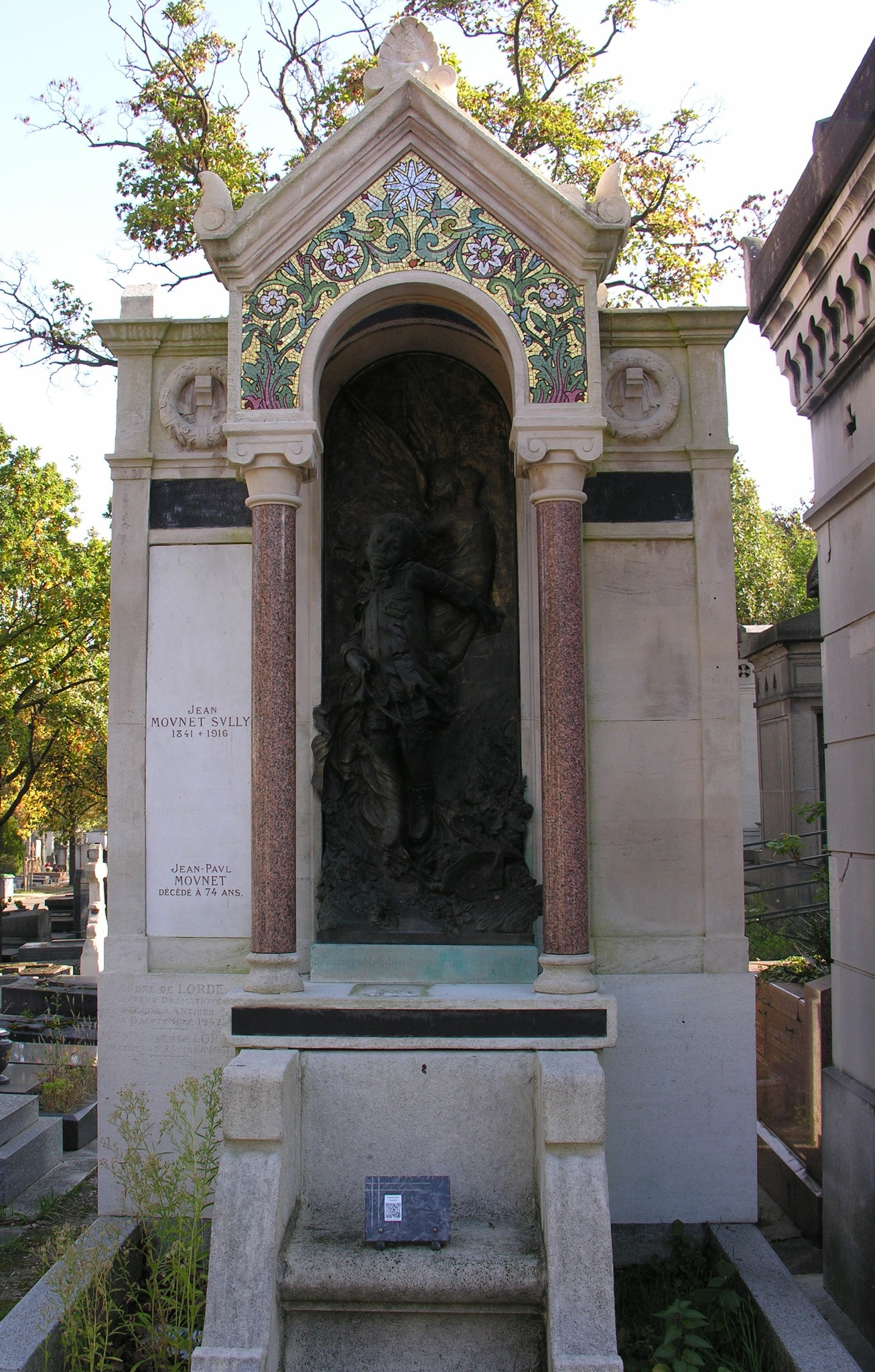
Grave in Cimetière Montparnasse.

== Sources ==
- Madame Sarah: By Cornelia Otis Skinner 1966
- "King of Fashion, The Autobiography of Paul Poiret", J. B. Lippincott Company, 1931; V&A Publishing, 2009, p. 7
