= Jeanne Sully =

French actress (1905–1995)

- Born: Jeanne Marie Régine Simone Champs; 15 April 1905; Paris, France
- Died: 28 June 1995 (aged 90); Meaux, Seine-et-Marne, France
- Occupation: Actress

Jeanne Sully (15 April 1905 – 28 June 1995) (born Jeanne Régine Champs) was a French actress.

== Biography ==
Jeanne Marie Régine Simone Champs was born in Paris on 15 April 1905. Her parents were the actors Jeanne Rémy and Jean Mounet-Sully, and her uncle was the actor Paul Mounet. She attended the Conservatoire national supérieur d'art dramatique in Paris, where she was a pupil of Raphaël Duflos. In 1924 she obtained a second prize for comedy, and in 1925 won a first prize in tragedy. She made her debut in 1925 at the Comédie-Française in Jean Racine's play Britannicus, in the role of Junie. She played in many stage roles, and in some films.

She became the 394th member of the Comédie-Française in 1934. She retired in 1946, but continued to make tours or give lectures both in France and abroad. She died in Meaux, Seine-et-Marne, on 28 June 1995 at the home for actors at Couilly-Pont-aux-Dames, Seine-et-Marne.

== Theater ==
Her theater roles included:

| Play | Author | Role |
|---|---|---|
| Britannicus | Jean Racine | Junie |
| Le Cid | Pierre Corneille | Chimène |
| Andromaque | Racine | Hermione |
| Phèdre | Jean Racine | Aricie |
| Bérénice | Jean Racine | Bérénice |
| Ruy Blas | Victor Hugo | la Reine |
| On ne badine pas avec l'amour | Alfred de Musset | Camille |
| Le Malade imaginaire | Molière | Angélique |
| L'École des maris | Molière | Léonor |
| Cyrano de Bergerac | Edmond Rostand | Roxanne |
| Le Gendre de M. Poirier | Émile Augier and Jules Sandeau | Antoinette |
| Le Mariage de Figaro | Pierre Beaumarchais | Chérubin |
| Twelfth Night | William Shakespeare | Viola |
| Le Soulier de satin | Paul Claudel | doña Isabel |
| La Reine morte | Henry de Montherlant | Inès de Castro |

== Filmography ==
| year | Film | Director | Role |
|---|---|---|---|
| 1912 | Oedipe-roi (La Légende d'Œdipe) | Gaston Roudès | Antigone |
| 1934 | Une soirée à la Comédie-Française | Léonce Perret | Almanzor |
| 1937 | Sisters in Arms | Léon Poirier | Louise de Bettignies |
