= German occupation of north-east France during World War I =

Occupation of French territory by Germany between 1914 and 1918

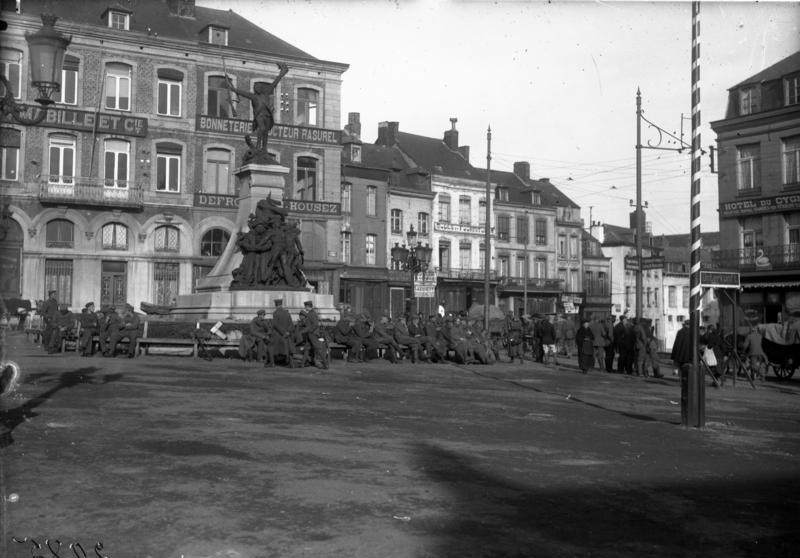
German soldiers resting during the occupation of the town of Hautmont.

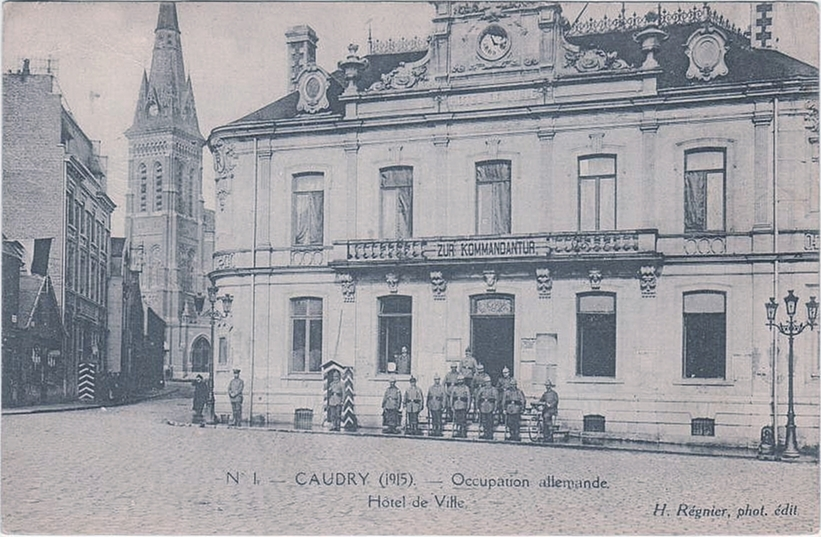
German occupation of the city hall (hôtel de ville) of Caudry, France, during World War I.

French territory, mostly north-east France along the border with Belgium and Luxembourg, was under military occupation by the German Empire during World War I. This entailed various impositions on the population, including malnutrition, forced labor, and requisitions of property, services, and goods.

== Territory occupied ==
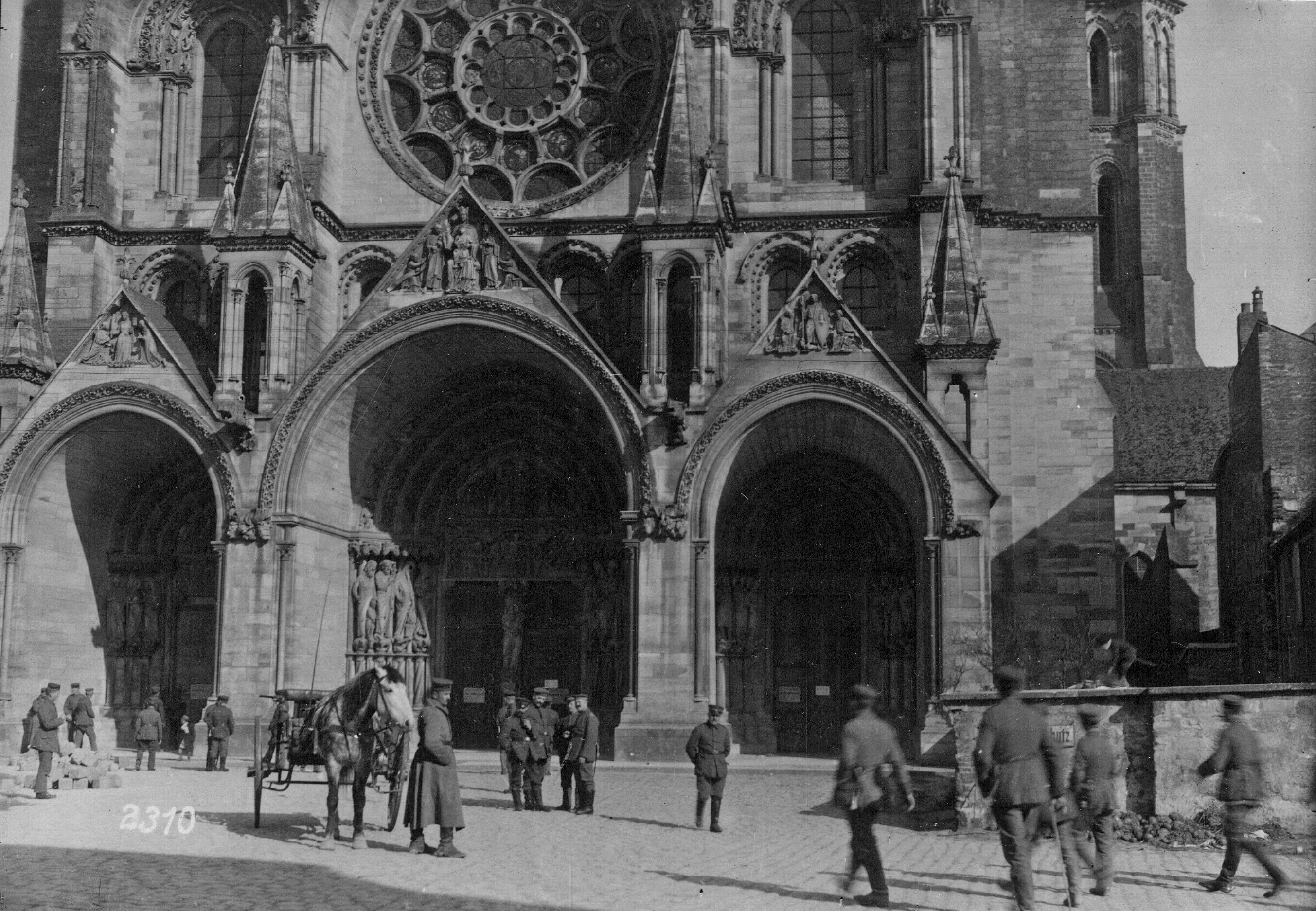
Scene in front of the Cathedral of Laon, France, March 1917.

The territory occupied by Germany at the end of 1914 included 10 départements in part or in full, includingː

- 70% of the Nord department;
- 25% of Pas-de-Calais;
- 16% of the Somme;
- 55% of the Aisne;
- 12% of Marne;
- 30% of Meuse;
- 25% of Meurthe-et-Moselle;
- 4.8% of Vosges;
- 100% of Ardennes.

These territories constituted 3.7% of the area and 8.2% of the population of France itself with about 2 million inhabitants.

The current departments of Bas-Rhin, Haut-Rhin, and Moselle, which were part of the German Reich from 1871 until their return to France at the end of the war in November 1918, are not included among the occupied territories.

The vast majority of the territory of neighboring Belgium was also occupied, with the exception of the western part of maritime Flanders, around Ypres. However, the Franco-Belgian border was maintained and the crossings controlled.

Part of Picardy was temporarily liberated in 1917 but the border area remained under German domination for four years: Lille for 1,465 days, Laon for 1,502 days, and Roubaix from October 14, 1914, to October 17, 1918.

The occupied zone was under military administration but some territories were assigned a particular status. The northern part of the valley of the Meuse River (including Givet and Fumay) was attached to the General Government of Belgium; the district of Briey was placed under German civil authority until December 1916, and was then subject to the military governor of Metz. The population of this area greatly decreased during this period due to both the excessive mortality relative to births as well as deportations and voluntary migration to unoccupied France. Thus, the department of the Ardennes, which had 319,000 inhabitants before the war, counted only 175,000 at the time of liberation. The population of Lille fell from 217,000 inhabitants at the beginning of 1914 to 112,000 in October 1918 and that of Roubaix from 122,723 to 77,824, while Tourcoing's population fell from 82,644 to 58,674. Some localities near the front and some towns in the Ardennes were emptied of the majority of their population. At the end of the war, Rethel had only 1,600 inhabitants, compared to 5,187 in 1911.

For the whole of the occupied territory, the statistics of the Food Committee of the North of France indicate 2,235,467 inhabitants in 1915, but only 1,663,340 as of June 30, 1918; the decrease over the entire period beginning in the autumn of 1914 was even higher.

The majority of the population was made up of women, children and the elderly, with most of the men having been mobilized.

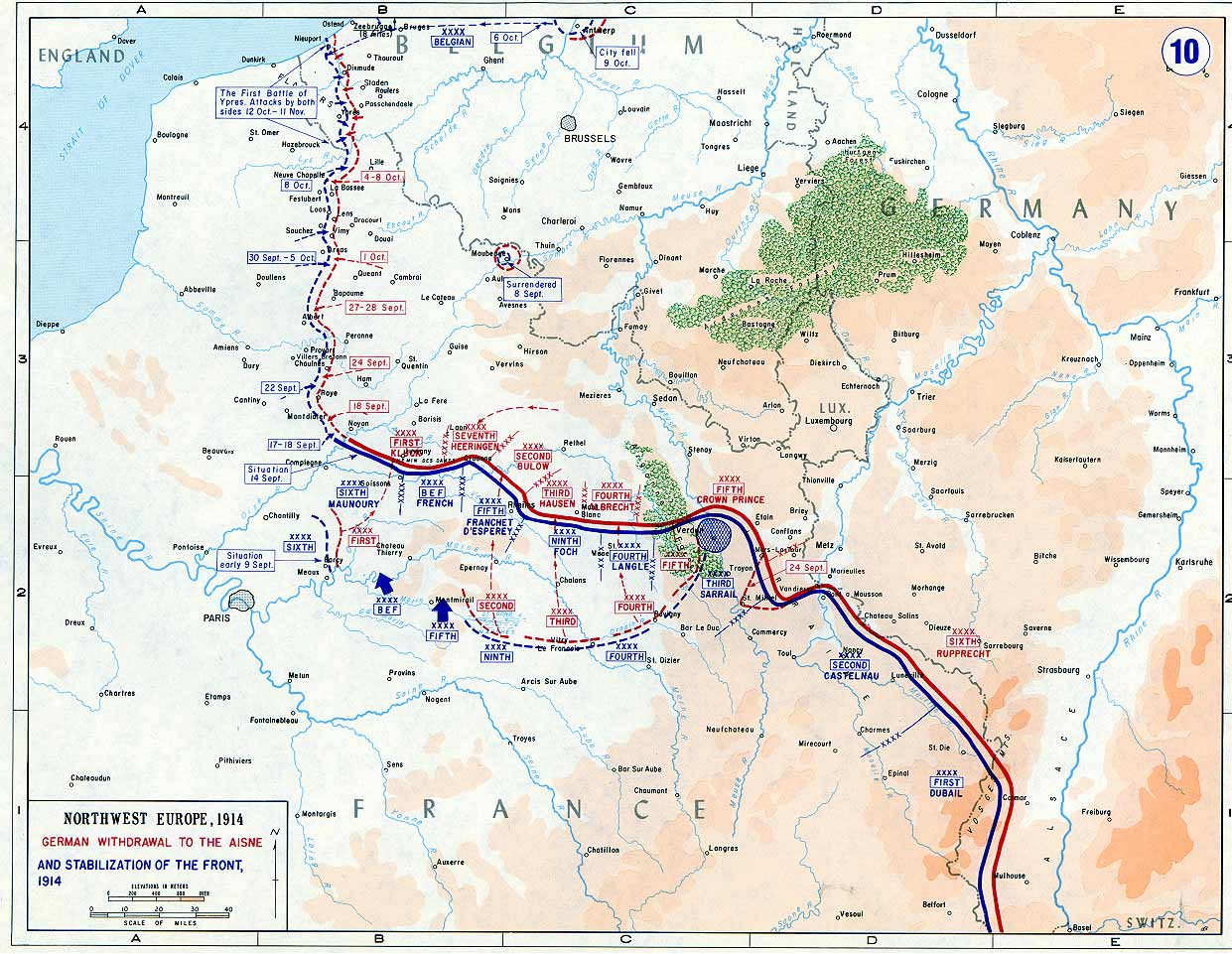
Front in 1914. Click to see enlarged version.

== History ==
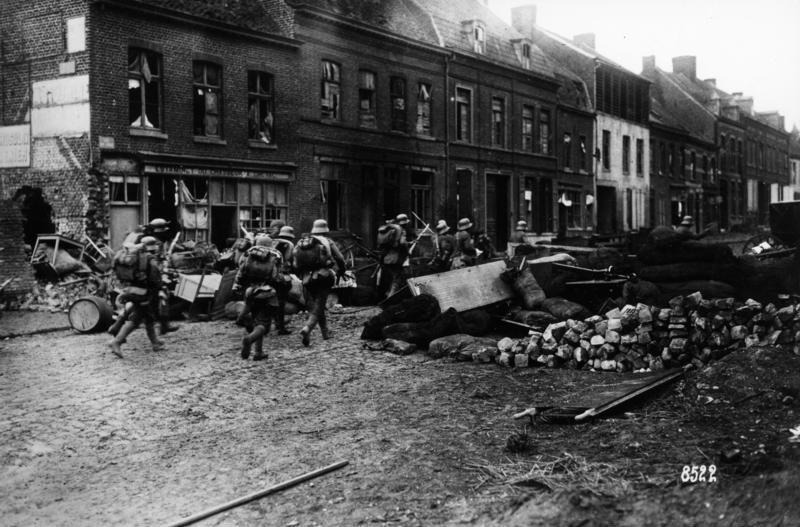
German troops wearing the Stahlhelm, advancing through a French town during World War I (c. 1916–18).

Owing to the speed of the German invasion of Belgium in 1914, fighting reached French soil early in the war. Though their advance was stopped at the First Battle of the Marne in September 1914, the Germans gained control of a portion of French territory, which remained under German occupation behind the stabilized Western Front for much of the rest of the war.

While the stories of the battlefield gained notoriety after the end of the war, the suffering of the occupied populations was often relegated to obscurity.

It would be hard to find war maps with captions to indicate occupied areas. During the duration of the hostilities, the combatants alone commanded the attention of the world. Considered as stolen and usurped, the occupied territories did not give rise to any particular graphic representation. Perceived as an area of the front, nothing designated them as occupied. This "unthinkable" has been perpetuated in memory. Hence physical violence has been erased from both physical and mental maps.

— Annette Becker, Les Cicatrices Rouges, Paris: Fayard, 2010, ISBN 978 2 213 65551 2, p. 10

Interest in the German occupation was in practice limited to the inhabitants of the affected areas in the years following the conflict.

== Isolated territory ==
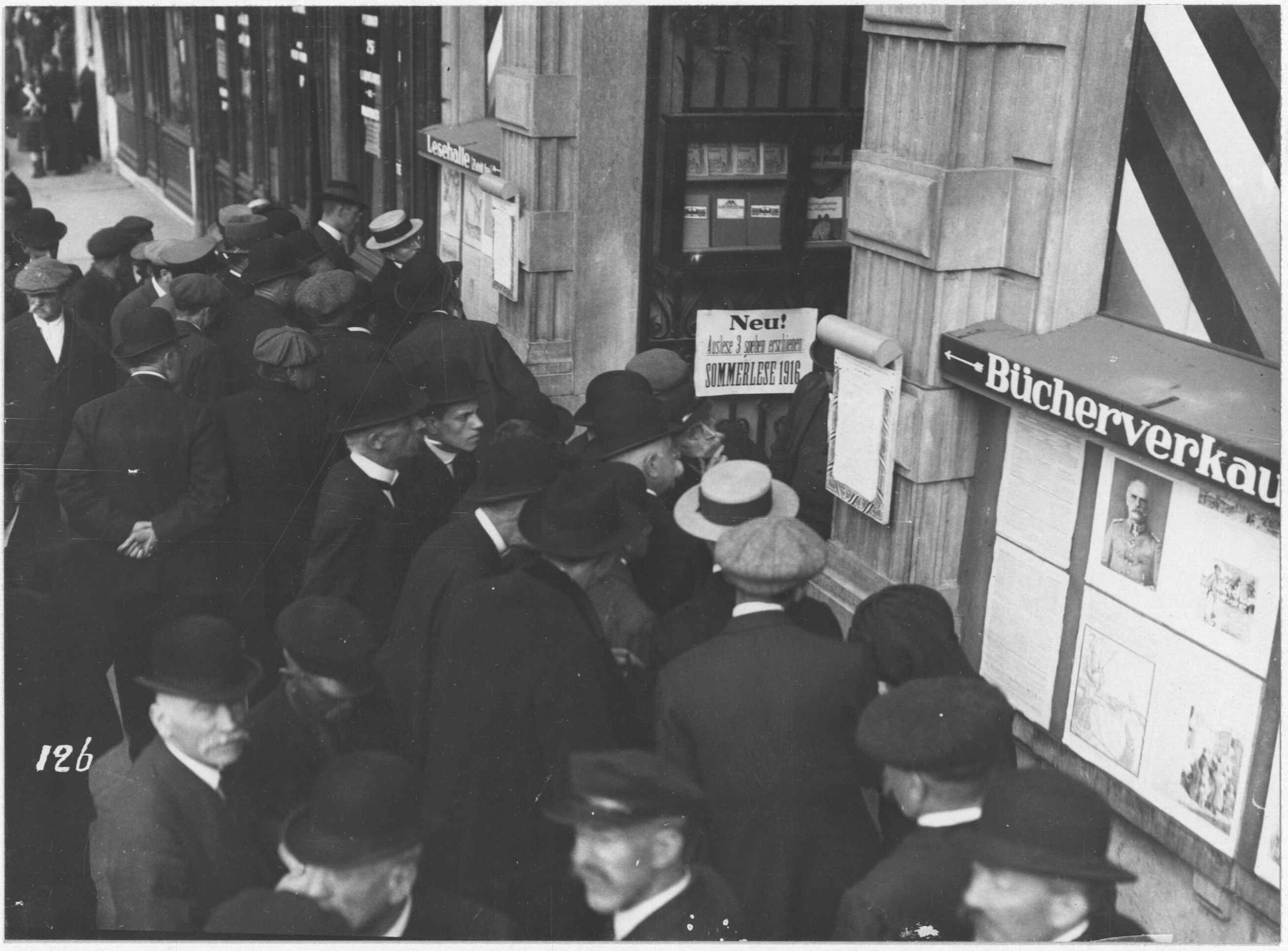
French citizens in Lille reading war reports, ca. 1917.

As soon as they arrived, the Germans hindered the movement of French residents and prevented the flow of information. Automobiles were requisitioned on October 15, 1914; next, bicycles, telephones and radio telegraphs were confiscated. Even pigeons had to be slaughtered for fear of transmission of messages by carrier pigeon.

Within the occupied territory, travel from one municipality to another required authorization from the German authorities and the issuing of a pass. Violations of these traffic rules could be punished with imprisonment or a fine. Such obstacles predictably increased the feeling of confinement for the French population.

Connections with unoccupied France were prohibited until April 1916. Only correspondence with relatives who were prisoners of war was authorized. It was limited to one card per month, and was also subject to censorship. Only half of the cards that passed through the Frankfurt Red Cross reached their recipients.

The publication of the prewar newspapers was also stopped, so the only periodicals available were the German propaganda newspaper La Gazette des Ardennes and the Bulletin de Lille, each published by the respective municipalities under German control. Even this was limited to practical and commercial information. Hence, news from the front could only filter through via underground newspapers with very low circulation or rumors. In practice, the majority of the population remained completely in the dark about external events.

Meanwhile, the occupied zone included some of the most industrialized parts of France: 64 percent of France's pig-iron production, 24 percent of its steel manufacturing and 40 percent of the total coal mining capacity was located in the zone, representing a major setback for the French industry. A number of important towns and cities were situated within it too, notably Lille, Douai, Cambrai, Valenciennes, Maubeuge and Avesnes. Partly because of its proximity to the front, occupied north-east France was ruled by the military, rather than by a civilian occupation administration. Economic exploitation of the occupied zone increased throughout the war. Forced labor became increasingly common as the war dragged on.

== Living conditions ==
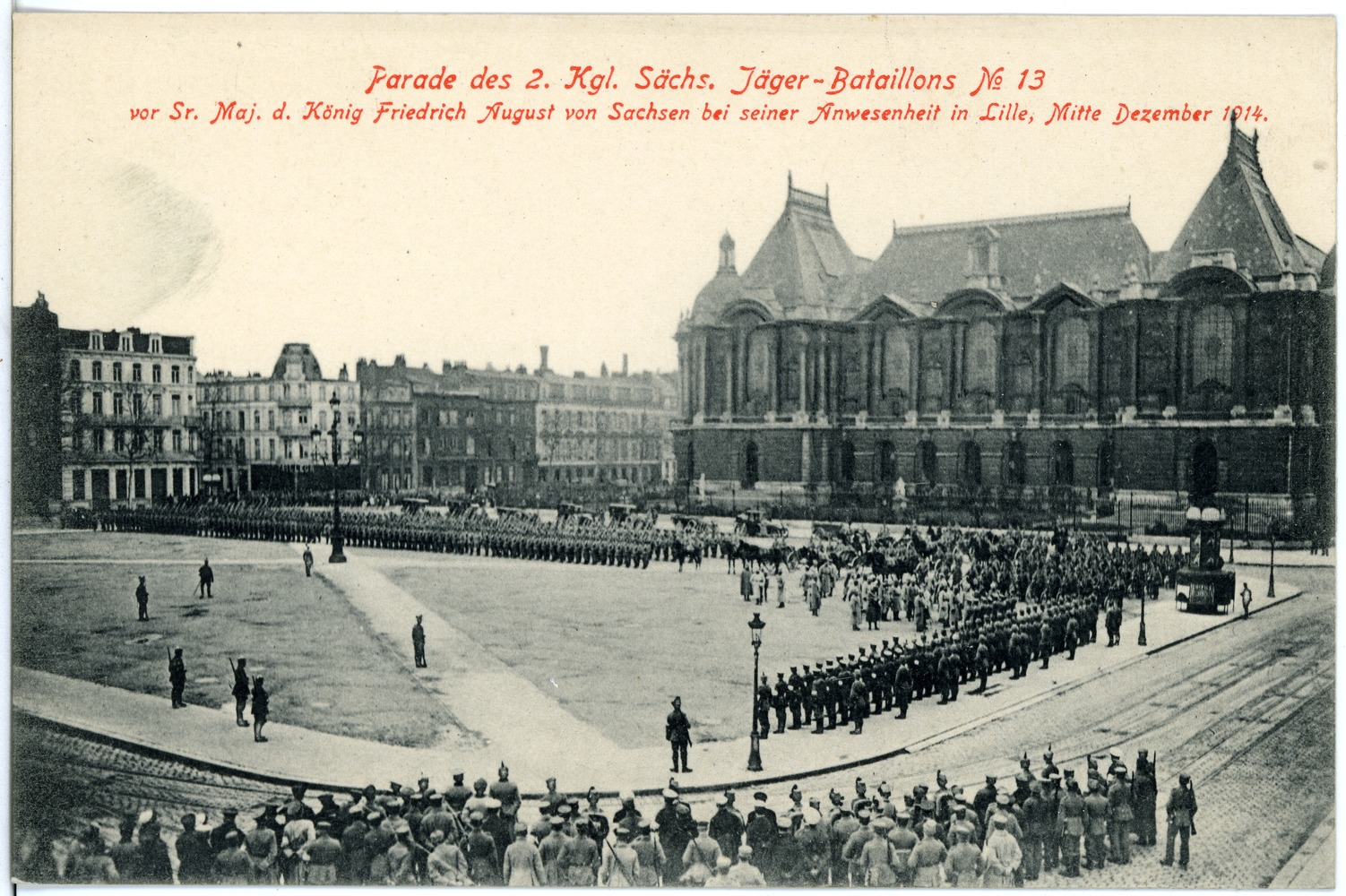
German military parade on the Place de la République in Lille, December 1914.

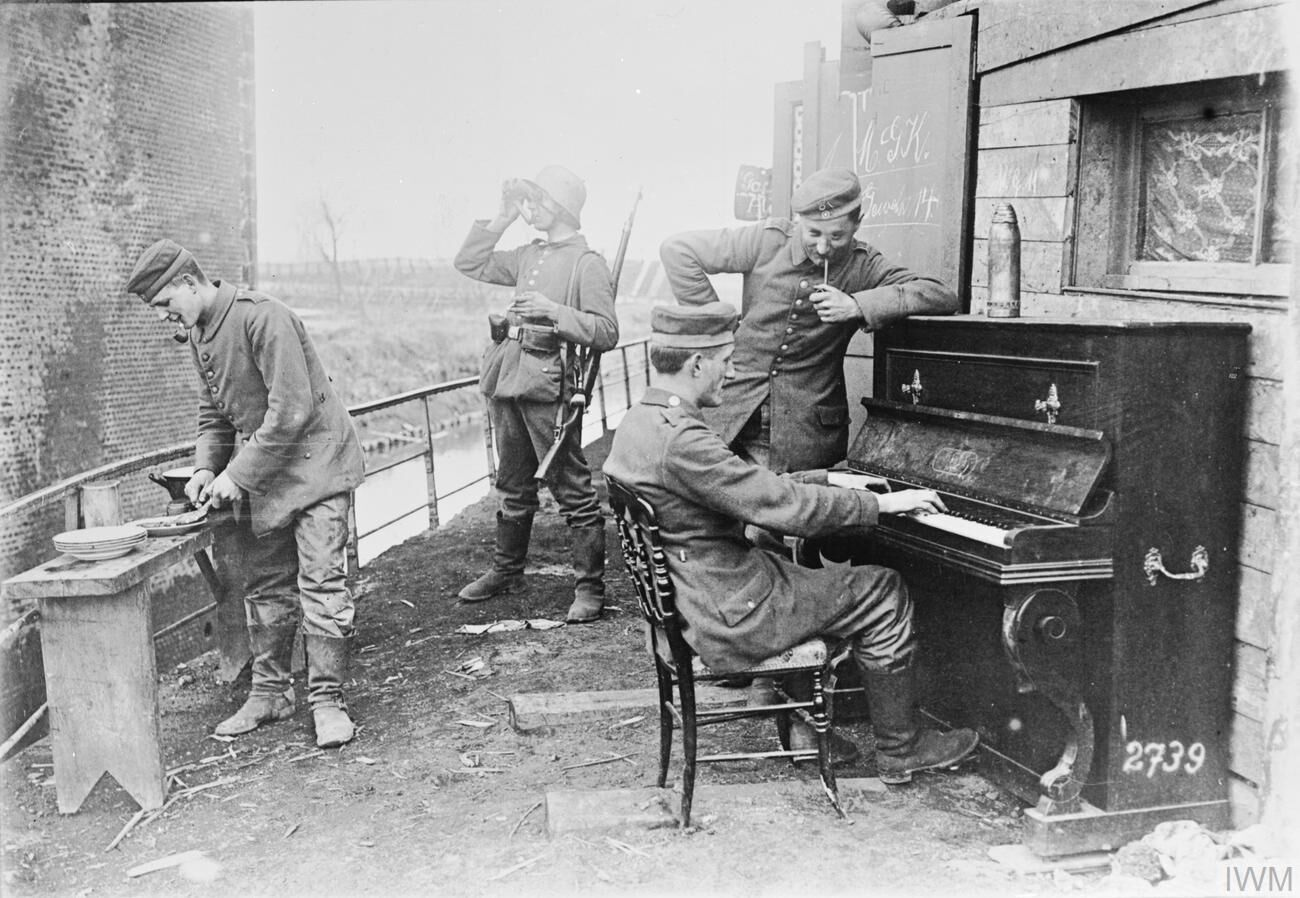
Leisure and entertainment at the Front: German troops relax outside their billet between Lens and Arras on the Western Front. Two are amusing themselves with a piano while a third is preparing food. In the background, a sentry keeps watch.

The German occupation did not respect the Hague Convention of 1907, which defined the rules applicable to the occupation of a territory by an enemy army, due to looting and the imposition of forced labor that contributed to their own war effort.

=== Omnipresence of the Germans ===
The Germans requisitioned most of the public buildings for their administration, the "Kommandantur" and for their troops; high schools and colleges were transformed into hospitals. Individual homes could at any time be requisitioned for soldiers. Large restaurants and places to relax were reserved exclusively for German troops, and military parades and concerts were organized. The proximity of the front (Lille was only fifteen kilometers away) generated constant troop movements. The larger cities became places of relaxation for soldiers on leave and, in Lille, those of the German General Staff. The considerable density of troops reached extreme proportions in localities such as Carvin with some 15,000 soldiers for 6,600 inhabitants.

=== Malnutrition ===
The shortage of food began shortly after the arrival of the occupying army. Germany itself, due to the British naval blockade of her ports, suffered from a lack of food and refused to support the populations of the occupied territories. This included almost all of Belgium, whose population totaled more than 10 million inhabitants. The Germans seized stocks as soon as they arrived and then made requisitions for the duration of the war. The Germans seized 80% of the 1915 wheat crop, and 75% of the potato crop. They also took the majority of the eggs and cattle. At the end of 1918, the livestock in the territories was reduced to a quarter compared to before the war. Famine loomed in the fall of 1914 and the question of food supplies was the main concern for the authorities in seeking aid from neutral countries.

The Mayor of Lille, Charles Delesalle, at first contacted Switzerland, on the advice of the Commander of the place, General von Heinrich. After this unsuccessful attempt, further steps led to an agreement signed on April 13, 1915 in Brussels between the Commission for Relief in Belgium, or CRB, and General von Bissing, the Senior Commander of the German Army in Belgium. This convention extended the food aid of the CRB, from which Belgium had benefited since October 22, 1914, to the populations of occupied France. The German army gave assurances that the goods would not be requisitioned. As in Belgium, the German authorities were interested in this aid, which avoided hunger riots and made it possible to continue levies on local agricultural production.

The CRB, funded by donations and grants from the United States Government, purchased food from the United States (42%), the British colonies (25%), Great Britain (24%), the Netherlands (9%) and a small quantity from France itself. Food imported into Belgium remained the property of the American Ambassador to Belgium, Brand Whitlock, until its distribution to the population.

Following Herbert Hoover's intervention with President Poincaré, France contributed to this aid by making payments to the Belgian government in exile (so that this indirect aid would be officially ignored by German authorities who actually knew about it). The financing of the CRB for a total amount of $700,000,000 throughout the war was provided at the level of $205,000,000 by the French Treasury $386,000,000 by the United States Treasury, $109,000,000 by the UK Treasury, and $52,000,000 of donations, mainly American).

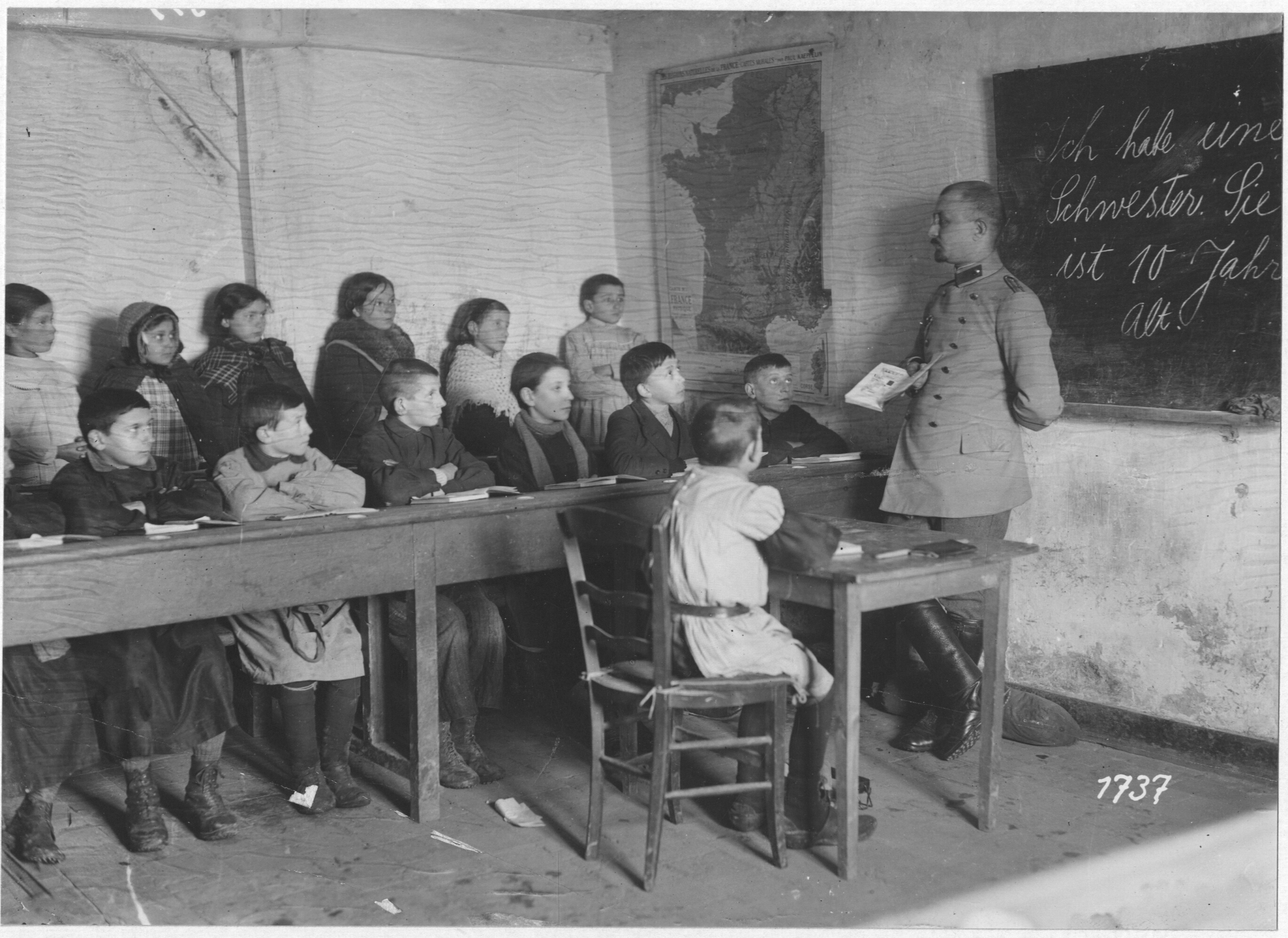
French children being instructed by a German teacher during the World War I occupation, Champagne, March 1917.

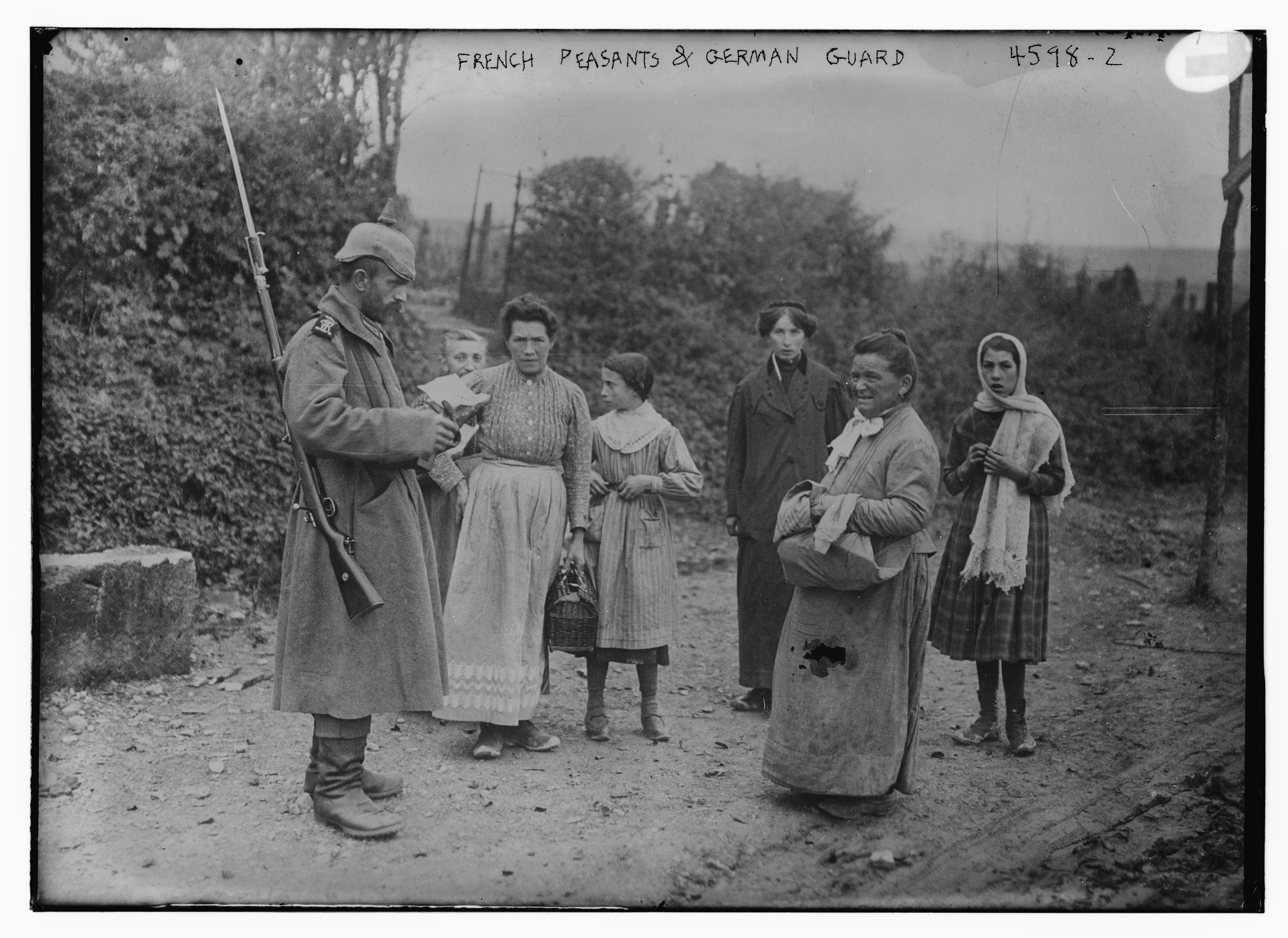
French peasants and a German guard, northeastern France, 1915.

The Food Committee of Northern France (CANF) was created under the patronage of the CRB and the National Relief and Food Committee (Belgian) for the distribution of food. Its administrative headquarters were in Brussels, and its executive committee chaired by Louis Guérin, a member of the Chamber of Commerce of Lille, at the Prefecture of the Nord département. Foodstuffs intended exclusively for distribution could not be traded. Offenses were punished with fines or imprisonment.

CANF included seven districts, in Lille, Valenciennes, Saint-Quentin, Marle, Tergnier, Fourmies and Longwy. Each commune had a local committee, warehouses and distribution offices. Lille had 60 offices, most of which were set up in schools, with the whole being managed by 800 civil servants. The municipalities paid for the supplies and passed on part of it to the inhabitants. The foodstuffs were transported from Belgium to depots mostly by river, due to rail transport being reserved for the German army. The aid of the CRB alleviated the shortage: its share in the supply is dominant in 1916, 1917 and 1918. The perception among prefects, the returnees, and in the general public was that "without American aid the population would have starved to death."

The food situation fluctuated; it deteriorated from October 1914 to April 1915; improved from the arrival of aid from the CRB in the spring of 1915; then deteriorated again from 1916. In Lille, the per capita daily rations fell to 1300 calories in 1917, then rose to 1400 in 1918 (intake in normal periods is on average of the order of 2800, a state of undernourishment is reached at below 2000). This insufficient amount of food was, moreover, unbalanced with severe deficiencies, particularly in vitamins.

The occupation of the city of Sedan and the difficult living situation were chronicled by Yves Congar who was only a child at the time. In his notebooks he describes the high inflation of food prices as well as the shortages affecting the territories occupied by the German army. Congar wrote on November 4, 1914, that "we don't have half a gram of bread left to eat."

Trade and catering remained free, but the prohibitive prices of the foodstuffs available made them accessible only to a privileged minority. The development of allotment gardens helped to alleviate the shortage somewhat. Complements were also provided by "go-getters" or "supply men", smugglers who got their supplies in Belgium; this was a very risky activity, which explains the high prices they charged. At first, some German soldiers and officers helped civilians, which was officially prohibited; but even this source of supply dried up from 1917 on, when the army itself began suffering from a shortage.

Although subjected to the levies of the enemy, the farmers, who managed to hide part of their production, suffered less from famine. Minors were also relatively privileged in the supply chain. The situation, very difficult in the towns, was particularly dramatic in Lille, which suffered throughout the occupation more severely than the region as a whole.

=== Public health ===
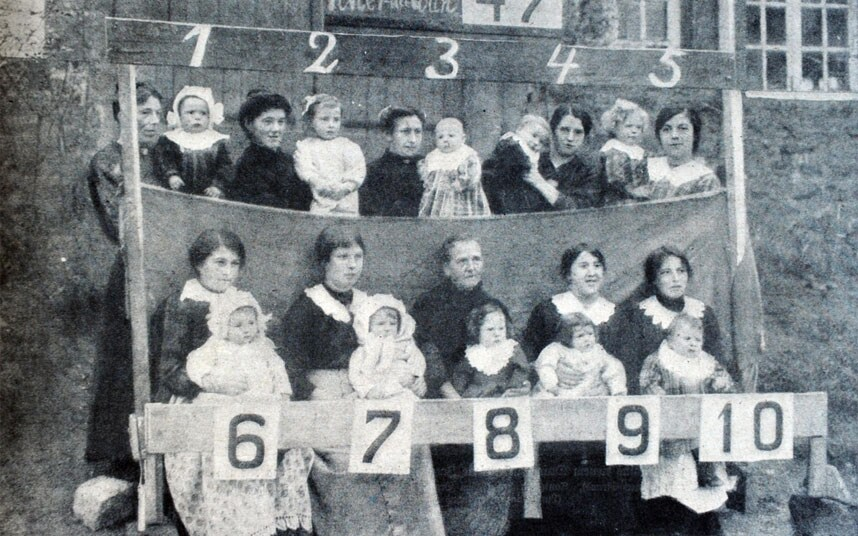

Malnutrition led to epidemics of typhoid in late 1915-early 1916, bacillary dysentery, increased deaths from tuberculosis and contributed to the general excess mortality. The mortality rate in Lille fluctuated according to the supply of food. In December 1915, it stood at 20‰, close to the average of the pre-war period, during one of the very rare periods when the supply is approaching normal. It rose to 42‰ in March 1916, fluctuated between 41 and 55‰ in 1917, and between 41 and 55‰ in 1918.

The birth rate, meanwhile, collapsed. The number of births in Lille dropped from 4885 in 1913 to 2154 in 1915, 602 in 1917, and 609 in 1918. Thus the demographic deficit, the excess of deaths over births, amounted to 14317 from October 1914 to February 1917. In 1918, 80% of adolescents were below normal weight.

Most of the hospitals were requisitioned by the German army; in Lille, this included the Saint-Sauveur hospital, the Hospice général, and the Lycée Faidherbe, a high school. During this period the Charité hospital remained the only civilian hospital in the city.

=== Abuses ===
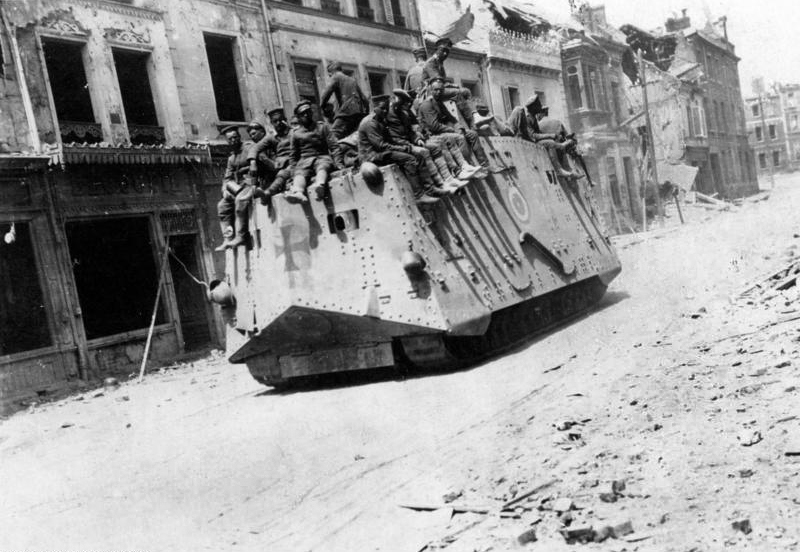
German troops photographed on a Sturmpanzerwagen (A7V tank) in Roye, France, 21 March 1918, during Operation Michael.

Atrocities were committed by the German troops on their entry into France in August and September 1914, which included the destruction of buildings and executions in retaliation for alleged resistance. Approximately 10,000 civilians, who were repatriated in February 1915, were deported to Germany, in particular to the camp of Holzminden. In most localities, major personalities were taken hostage. Thus, upon their arrival in Lille, the Germans took 19 hostages, the Mayor, the Prefect, the Bishop, and 8 municipal councilors, who were summoned daily to the Kommandantur and forced to report every 6 days to the Citadel.

Heavy monetary contributions were imposed on the municipalities as well. A first contribution of 1,300,000 F was requisitioned from the city of Lille on November 1, 1914 by the German authorities, which was raised to 1,500,000 F per month from January 1915. In total, 184 million F were paid by the city of Lille to the occupier in 4 years, 12.9 million by the city of Cambrai, 48 million by that of Roubaix, 25 million by that of Tourcoing. Small towns were not spared, either. Responding to the request of the municipalities, the French government granted loans through complex financial circuits to the major cities of the region.

=== Unemployment ===
The closure of textile factories, the largest employer in the Lille-Roubaix-Tourcoing agglomeration, and metallurgical industries, caused a high rate of unemployment. In 1918, 46,300 inhabitants of Lille received unemployment benefit (36% of the total population), 24,977 in Tourcoing (38%), 23,484 in Roubaix (38%). In 1916, only 35,000 inhabitants of Lille out of 150,000 could support themselves; three-quarters of the inhabitants of Tourcoing subsisted on relief; 80% of those in Valenciennes alone.

=== Industrial plunder ===
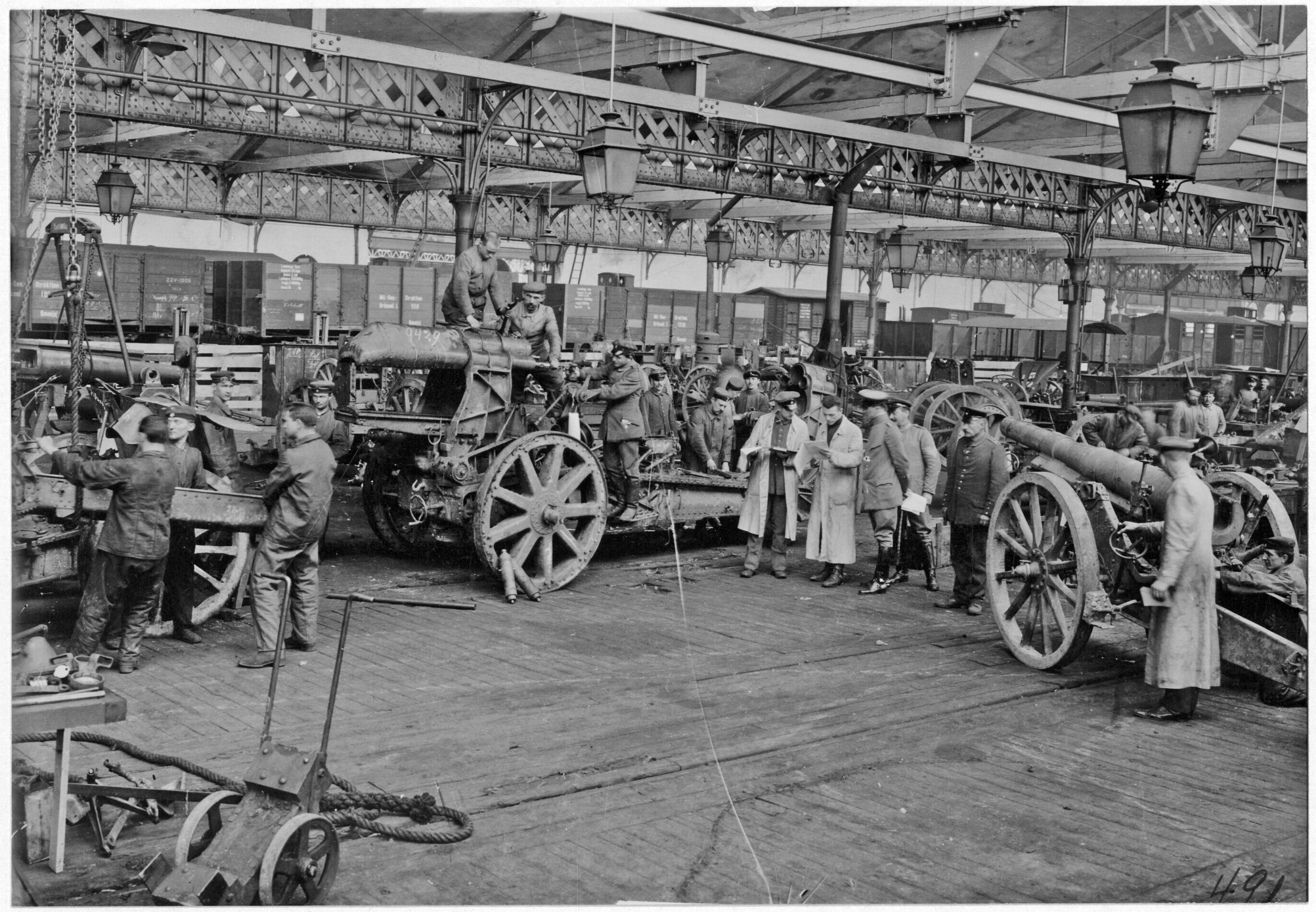
View of an artillery machine shop, Lille, France, 1917 or 1918.

An administration called the Schutzverwaltung, created at the start of the occupation, requisitioned supplies, leading to the cessation of industrial activity. This material was then systematically transferred to Germany. Factories emptied of their equipment were sometimes transformed for other uses: hospitals, prisons, stockyards, stables, etc. From the end of 1916, the equipment that remained in place and the buildings themselves were systematically destroyed to suppress competition from French industry after the war. During the retreat of the German army in September and October 1918, the mining installations were dynamited and the galleries flooded. The dismantling of all the breweries in the occupied areas to recover the copper is described in the Journal de Pabert.

=== Requisitions ===
As soon as the Germans arrived, all cars had to be handed over to the occupiers. Various products and objects of daily life were requisitioned, such as bicycles, household items, including copper, tin and alloys (essentially all metal objects), rubber (including bicycle tires), skins, oils, leather, wire, and finally the wool of mattresses and pillows, including those of the hospitals. This last confiscation particularly traumatized a starving population, including many patients, who were already deprived of heating and now of bedding, with the use of straw as a replacement being prohibited as well. These requisitions were accompanied by incessant excavations. Many works of art in public space made of bronze were likewise unbolted and melted down.

Bronze statues demounted and melted

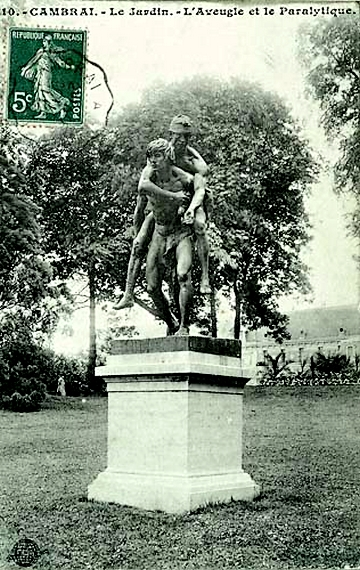
L'Aveugle et le Paralytique in Cambrai.

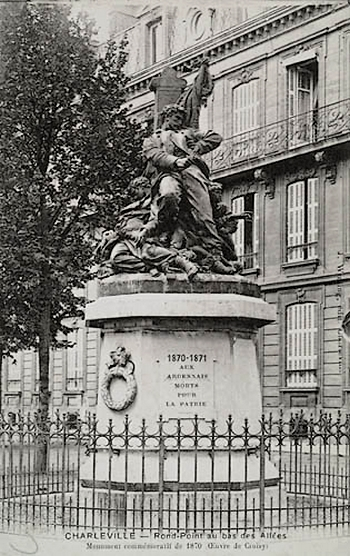
Monument to the dead of 1870 in Charleville-Mézières.

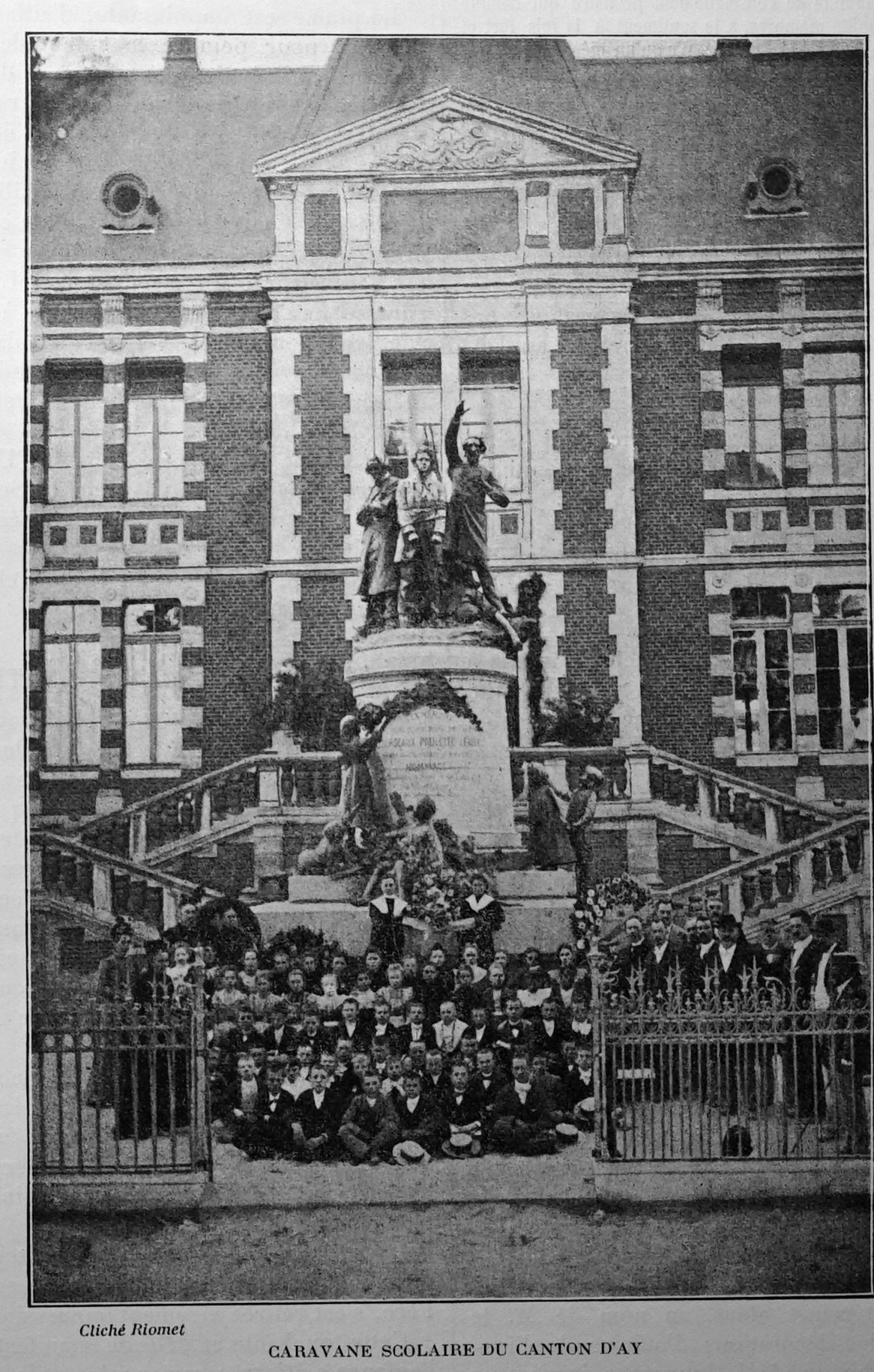
Monument to the teachers Debordeaux, Poulette and Leroy in Laon.

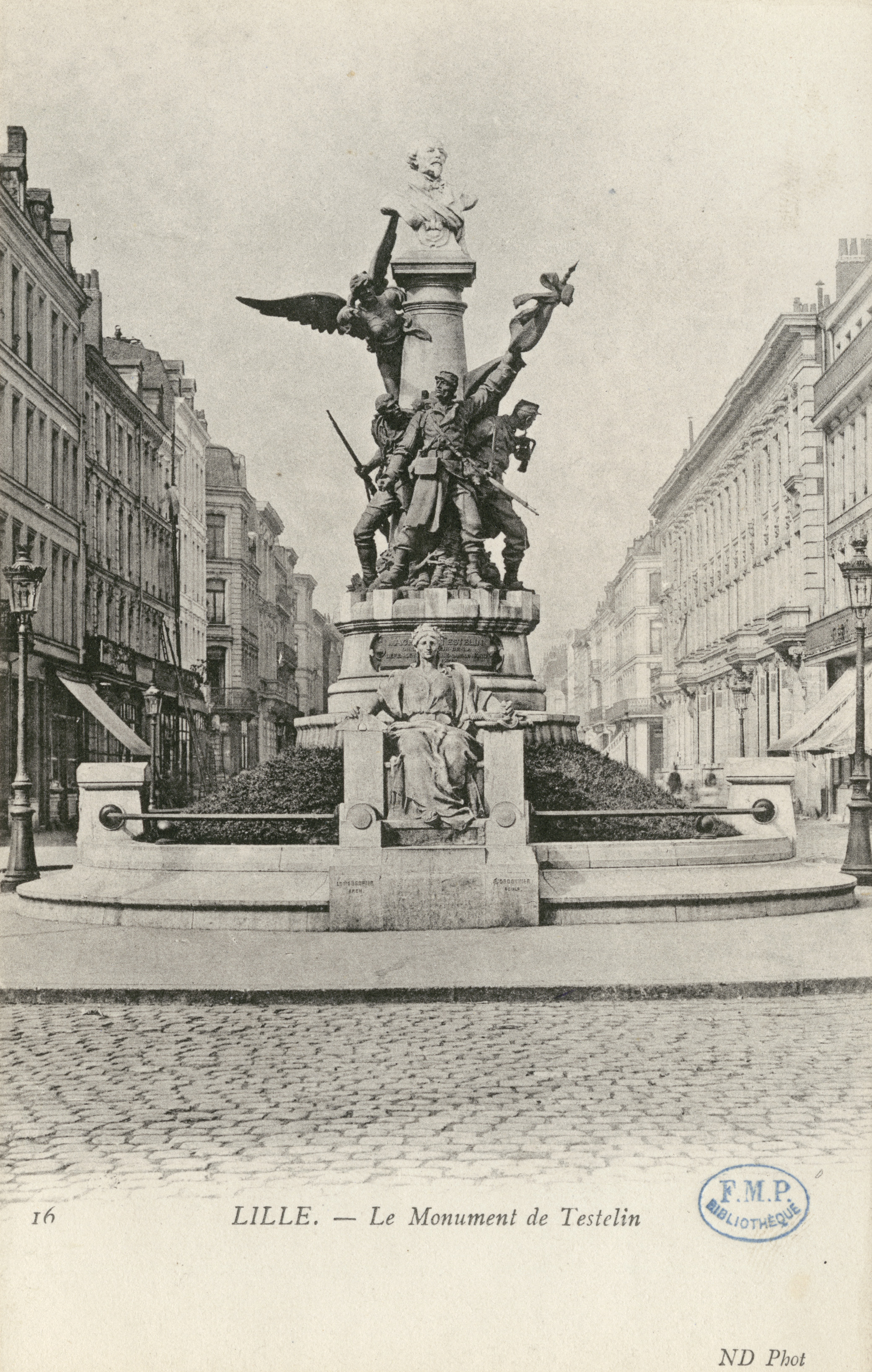
Commemorative monument to the national defense in 1870 in Lille.

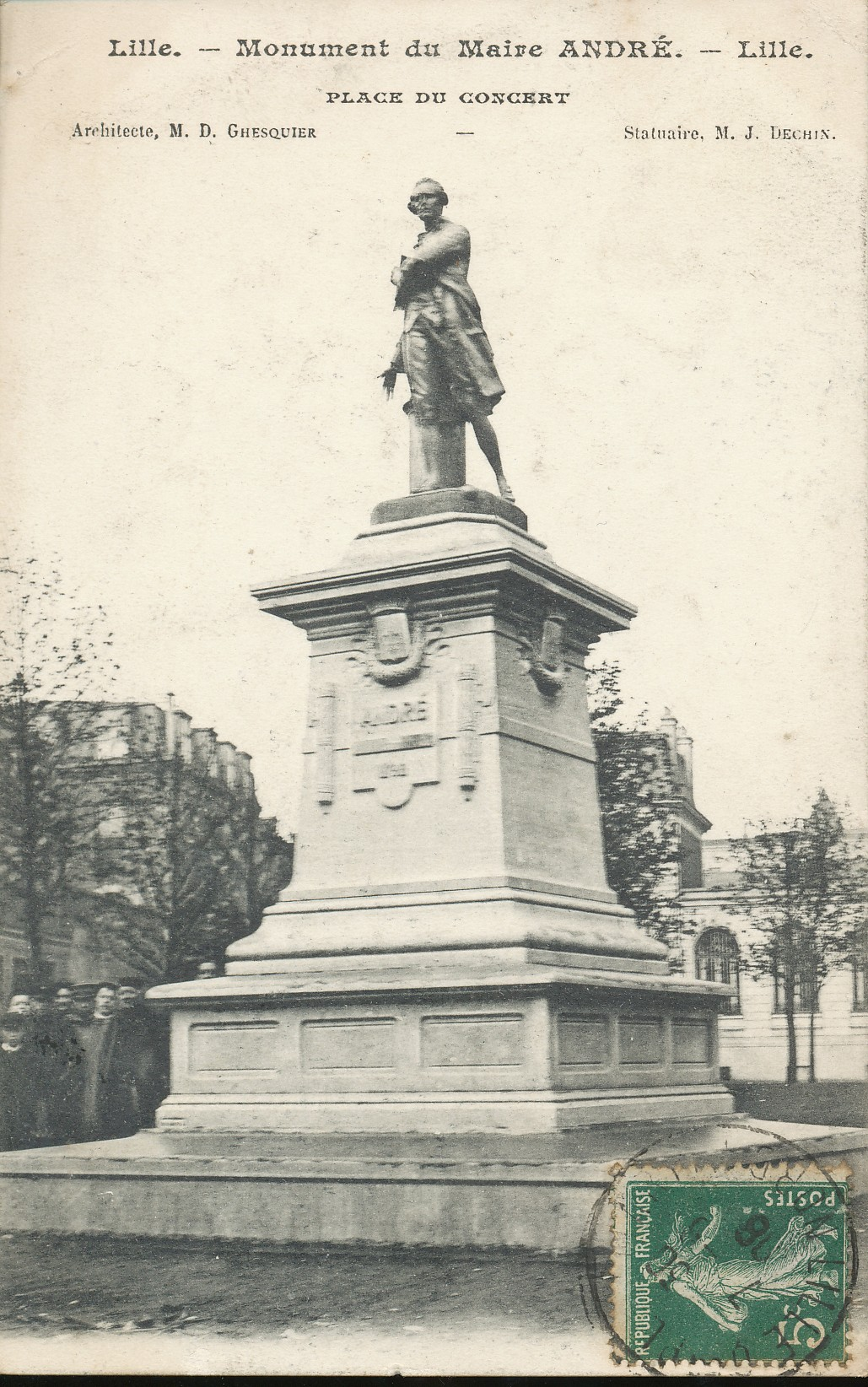
Statue of François André-Bonte on the Place du Concert in Lille.

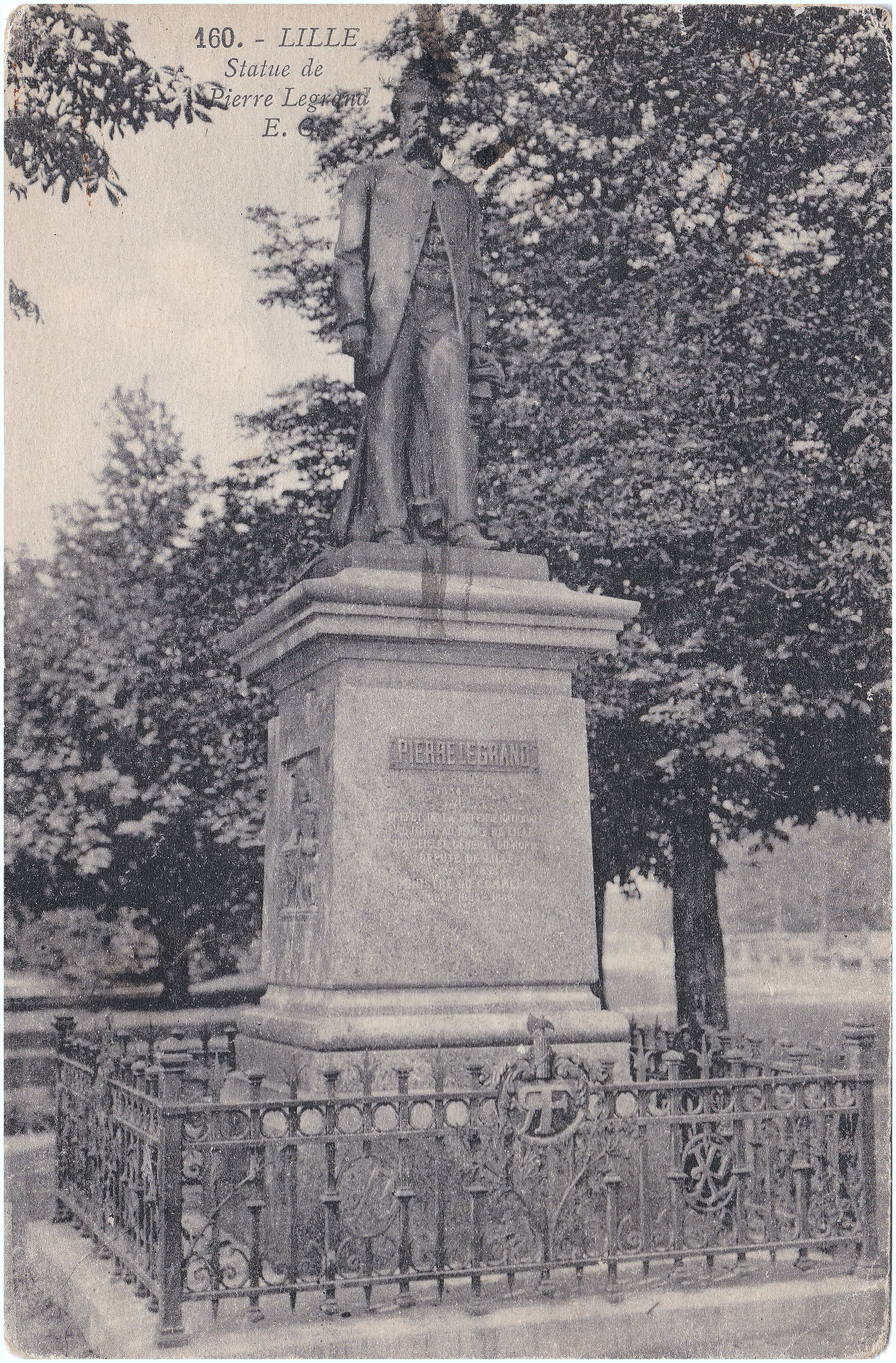
Statue of Pierre Legrand in Lille.

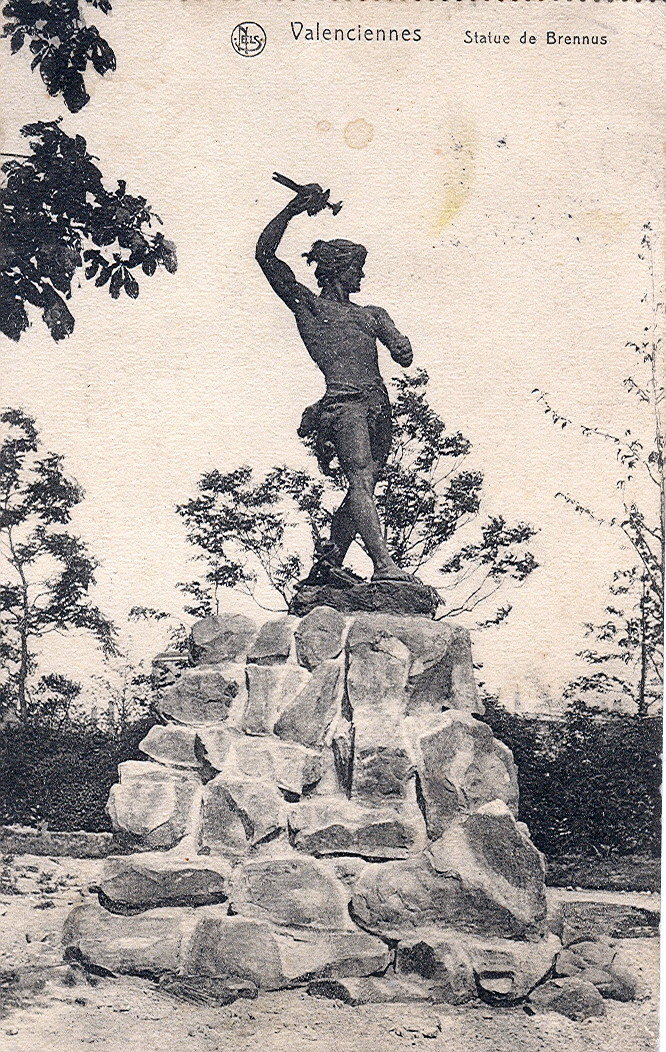
Statue of Brennus in Valenciennes.

=== Forced labor ===
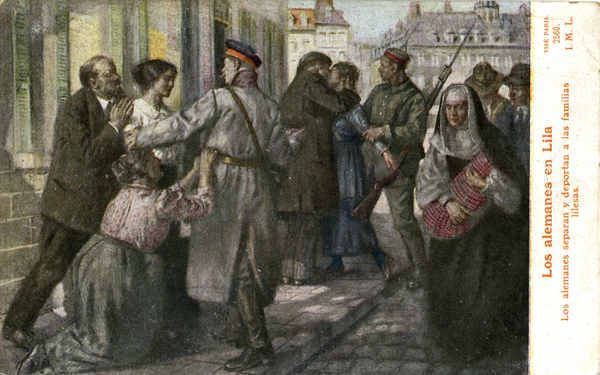
Families separated in Lille during the First World War.

The inhabitants were subjected to forced labor imposed not only on men but also on women and children starting at the age of 9. Workers were assigned to various jobs such as washing uniforms, earthworks, unloading wagons, and, just as France required for German prisoners, digging trenches and installing barbed wire, in violation of the Hague Conventions, which prohibited the employment of civilians for the war effort against their homeland.

Work camps were organized for which young girls and young women, torn from their families, were transported and loaded into cattle wagons for distant destinations; for example, from Lille to the Ardennes. The deportations of April 1916, which might be described as round-ups, affected 9,300 people in Lille and 4,399 in Tourcoing; in total 20,000 in the area, in the proportion of three women for every man. The health inspection imposed on young girls, similar to that imposed on prostitutes, was particularly traumatizing. The deportees were most often employed in agricultural work. Indeed, unlike the cities suffering from massive unemployment following the closure of factories, agriculture lacked manpower due to the departure of the mobilized men. In most cases, the workers (mostly women workers) were taken to the fields and watched by armed soldiers; they were subjected to exhausting work and suffered from malnutrition.

=== Evacuations and repatriations ===
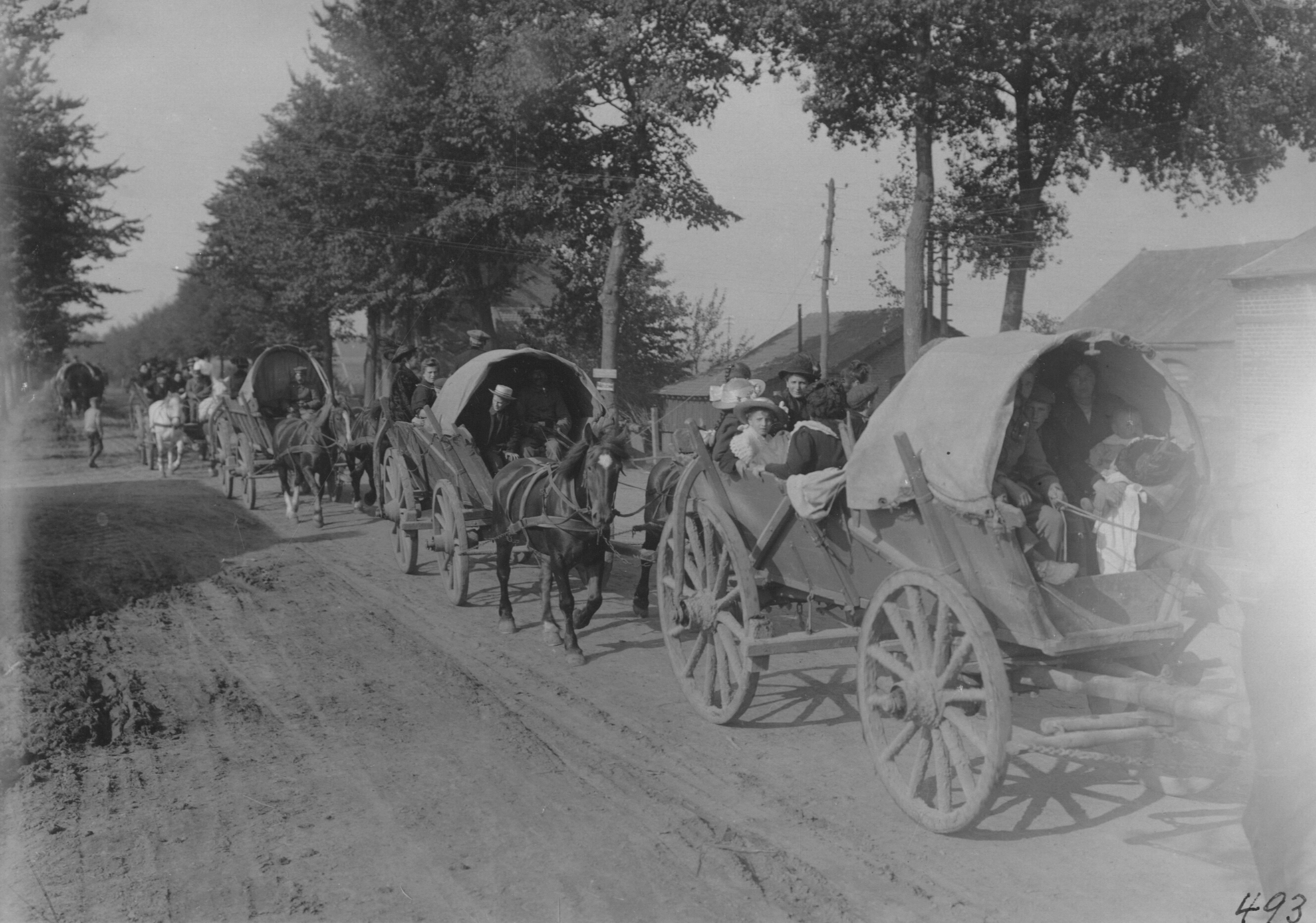
French citizens evacuating Bapaume, ca. 1917, in horse-drawn wagons.

The Germans evacuated the women, children and old people from their homes towards other parts of France, not to feed them, but to recover lodgings to house their own troops. After the inhabitants of Lille, whose homes were destroyed by the bombardments of the siege of October 11 and 12, 1914, were deported, the first evacuations began in January 1915. The trip via Switzerland with re-entry into France at Annemasse or Évian was at different times made by train, car or cattle wagon.

The first of these "repatriations" were imposed because the inhabitants preferred, initially, to undergo the difficulties of the occupation than to leave their place of life. Thus, the 450 people evacuated by train in March 1915 included only 47 volunteers. As early as 1915, the difficult supply situation, the requisitions and the abuses led a large number of inhabitants to escape from the suffering. In December 1915, a convoy of 750 only included five forced evacuees. Subsequently, when the number of desired departures began to outnumber the available spots in the convoys, the German authorities refused some of the requests. Some town hall officials who participated in the preparation of the lists were bribed by applicants to obtain a place.

In total, nearly 500,000 people out of a population of around 2 million in 1914 were repatriated via Switzerland from October 1914 until the end of the war. This represented a high rate of 25%.

== Acts of resistance ==
The resistance to the German occupation was evident but varied in degree. It included both passive resistance, such as indifference displayed towards the occupier or refusal to come into contact, and small forms of daily resistance such as opposition to requisitions and forced labor as well as provision of food aid to prisoners. All such acts were punishable with imprisonment. It also included the most active and risky actions of resistance, such as sabotage of railway tracks, aid to soldiers, organization of escape networks, publishing and distributing the underground press (with low circulation, in the best of cases several hundred, the press was sometimes limited to a few copies; the most notable was the newspaper Patience, which changed its name several times and whose group was dismantled by the Germans in 1916). It also entailed the collection of military intelligence communicated to the allies, activity organized in networks, with the best known being that of Jacquet, Trulin and Louise de Bettignies.

== Collaboration ==
Map of devastation of northeastern France. Zones totally destroyed: red. Significant damage: yellow.

Active collaboration was more limited than that experienced in occupied France during World War II. Collaboration inspired by intellectual or ideological support was practically non-existent except for correspondents of the propaganda periodical La Gazette des Ardennes. Economic collaboration was more widespread: voluntary or industrial work accepting orders for the army, mayors diverting food intended for civilians for soldiers, etc. The collaboration also took the form of denunciations, whether of concealed French soldiers, hiding places of weapons, food or objects withdrawn from requisitions. Most of these were motivated by local jealousy and the secret German military police (Geheime Feldpolizei) employed French informants.

=== Accommodations ===
Relations between occupiers and occupied, however, were not uniformly hostile. Cohabitation with soldiers in requisitioned housing was often cordial or even supportive and created bonds of friendship as well as romantic relationships, which could be genuine or motivated to facilitate the requisition of supplies. Although it is impossible to assess them, illegitimate births resulting from these unions appear to be quite numerous. Some marriages between soldiers and French women have been accepted by the authorities. Such women were generally stigmatized by part of the occupied population. These "Boche women" were often decried upon liberation.

== Aftermath ==
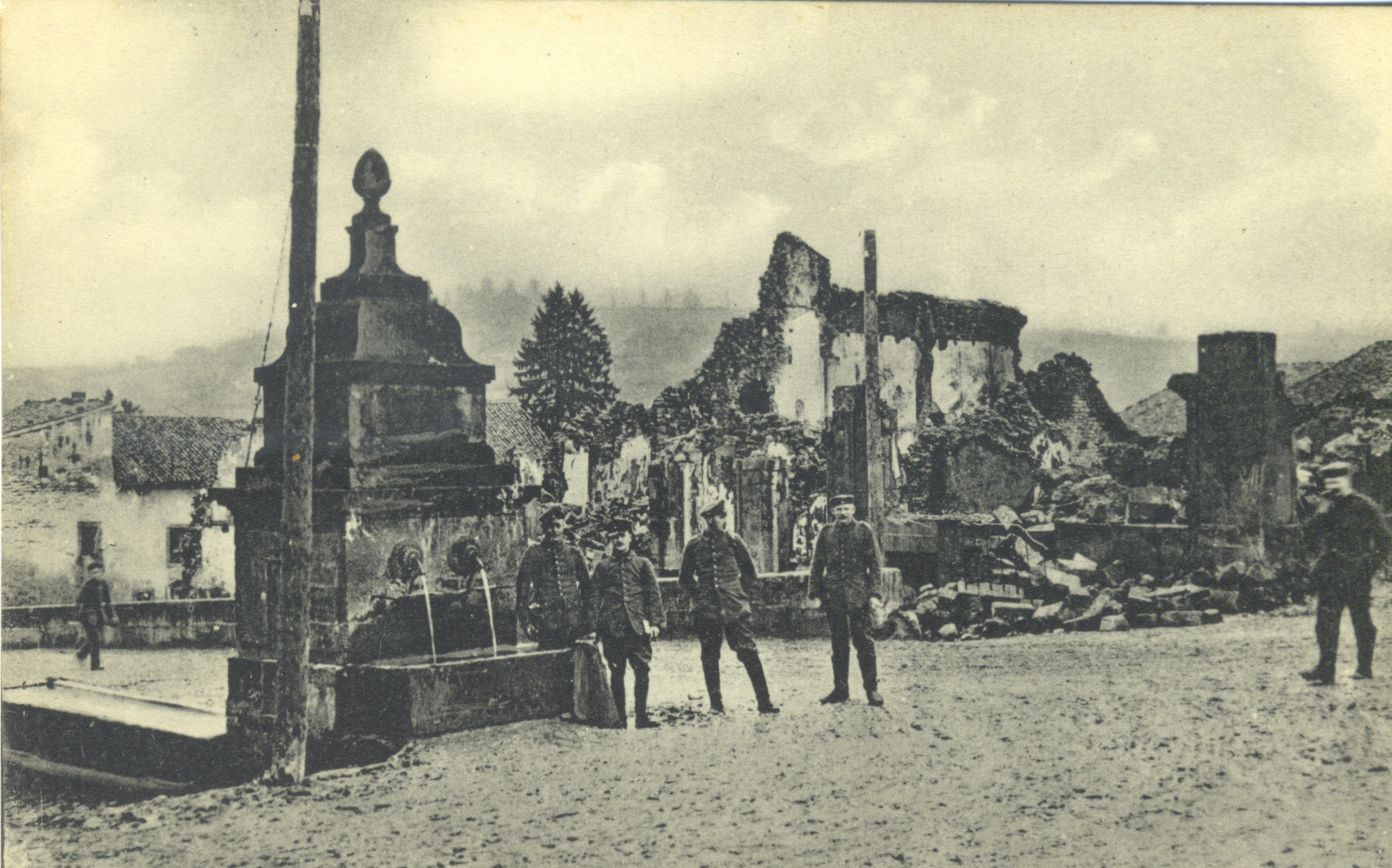
Postcard view of Marville, France, showing the devastation of World War I fighting.

According to the 1923 censuses of the Ministry of Liberated Regions, out of all the municipalities in the affected areas (including in addition to the occupied areas, that of the front), 620 were completely destroyed; 1,334 were destroyed to a degree of more than 50%; 2,349 were partially damaged; 423 remained intact; 293,043 buildings were completely destroyed and 148,948 severely damaged.

According to economist Alfred Sauvy, the cost of lost property and its restoration is estimated at 34 billion gold francs. Some of the equipment brought to Germany was recovered and the industry restarted fairly quickly in the early 1920s, but the slower reconstruction lasted into the mid-1930s.

The German government refused to extradite those responsible for the abuses and the open trials were unsuccessful. This impunity contributed to the feeling of injustice among the inhabitants.

The memory of the First World War prompted the majority of the population of the northern regions to flee to the south in June 1940. During the occupation of 1940–44, acts of resistance multiplied, collaboration was much weaker than in the rest of France, and the Vichy government was very unpopular in the north-east from November 1940.

=== Legacy ===
In the interwar years local narratives and studies were published, but subsequently these territories were neglected by the French historiography of the Great War. However, two accounts of this "forgotten" history were published in 2010, La France Occupée [Occupied France] by Philippe Nivet and Les Cicatrices Rouges [The Red Scars] by Annette Becker.

Those who were under occupation considered their experience too difficult to be understood by other French people.

Those who lived through both occupation periods considered the first to be infinitely harder than that of 1940–44, and in itself more trying in the prohibited zone compared to what was suffered in other parts of France, both in the free and occupied zones.

== In popular culture ==
Much of the 1928 novel Schlump by Hans Herbert Grimm is set in German-occupied France where the protagonist works in the occupation administration.

The Alice Network is a 2017 novel about a real allied spy ring of the same name, set in Lille.

== See also ==
- Nord-Pas de Calais Mining Basin
- World War I reparations

== Bibliography ==
- Wegner, Larissa (2014). "Occupations during the War (France and Belgium)". International Encyclopedia of the First World War.
- Kennedy, Paul (1989). The Rise and Fall of the Great Powers. Vintage Books. ISBN 0-679-72019-7.
- Becker, Annette (2010). Les cicatrices rouges 14-18 France et Belgique occupés (in French). Paris: Fayard. ISBN 978-2-213-65551-2.
- Buffetaud, Yves (2014). Le Nord en guerre. Ysec éditions. ISBN 978-2-84673-193-5.
- Deruyck, René (1992). Lille dans les serres allemandes. La Voix du Nord. ISBN 2-208-26023-6.
- Lembré, Stéphane (2016). La guerre des bouches (1914-1918). Ravitaillement et alimentation à Lille (in French). Villeneuve d'Ascq: Presses universitaires du Septentrion. ISBN 978-2-7574-1280-0.
- Nivet, Philippe (2011). La France occupée. 1914-1918 (in French). Paris: Armand Colin. ISBN 978-2-200-35094-9.
- Le Maner, Yves (2011). La grande guerre dans le Nord et le Pas-de-Calais 1914-1918 (in French). Lille: La Voix. ISBN 978-2-84393-181-9.
- Yves Congar, Journal de la Guerre (1914-1918)
