= The Alice Network =

2017 historical novel by Kate Quinn

- First edition (publ. William Morrow)
- Author: Kate Quinn
- Cover artist: Diahann Sturge
- Language: English
- Genre: Historical novel
- Publisher: William Morrow
- Publication date: 2017
- Publication place: United States
- Media type: Print (hardcover and paperback) and audiobook
- Pages: 560 (first edition, paperback)
- ISBN: 978-0062654199 (first edition, paperback)
- Website: www.katequinnauthor.com/books/the-alice-network

The Alice Network is a 2017 historical novel by American author Kate Quinn. It was a New York Times and USA Today bestseller.

The story is based on the real-life World War I spy ring called the Alice Network, which operated in German-occupied France and Belgium. Three historical figures are used as characters in the novel:

- Louise de Bettignies, the ring leader (code name Alice Dubois, called Lili in the book);
- Léonie van Houtte, her lieutenant (code name Violette Lameron in the book); and
- Cecil Aylmer Cameron, a British Intelligence officer (called Captain Cameron and Uncle Edward in the book), who recruited both women.

The novel uses a dual narrative approach, alternating between events that occurred beginning in 1915 and in 1947. The 1915 story involves a fictional character named Eve Gardiner (code name Marguerite Le François), who was selected by Captain Cameron to join the Alice Network in Lille, France, under the direction of Lili.

The primary character in the 1947 story is the fictional American college student Charlotte (Charlie) St. Clair. Charlie finds Eve in England and enlists her help to find Rose Fournier, Charlie's French cousin who went missing during World War II. In the end, Eve and Charlie find that they both have reason to hunt down a certain restaurant owner, profiteer and collaborator named René.

== Plot ==
The narrative starts in 1947. American college student Charlotte (Charlie) St. Clair is on her way to Switzerland with her mother, who has arranged for her to get an abortion. However, Charlie is more interested in finding her French cousin Rose Fournier, who disappeared during World War II. During a stopover in England, she slips away from her mother and tracks down World War I British spy Eve Gardiner, whose name appeared on a report Charlie's father had received when he was trying to locate Rose.

The story of Evelyn (Eve) Gardiner starts in London in 1915. She is recruited by "Uncle Edward" (Captain Cameron) to join the Alice Network, a group of mostly female spies working against the Germans in northeastern France. The ring is headed by “Lili” (Louise de Bettignies). Using the code name Marguerite Le François, Eve takes a waitress job in Lille at a restaurant named Le Lethe, which caters to German officers and is operated by René Bourdelon, a French collaborator and profiteer.

Eve conceals her fluency in German so she can eavesdrop on conversations at the restaurant and pass on valuable intelligence to Lili and her lieutenant “Violette” (Léonie van Houtte).

Over time, Bourdelon becomes attracted to Marguerite and seduces her. She accepts his advances so she can get even more information to pass on to Lili. Eventually, he discovers that she is a British spy. In attempting to get information from her, he breaks all of the joints of her fingers. When she refuses to tell him anything, he gives her opium and tells her afterwards that, while under the influence of the drug, she betrayed Lili and her network.

Eve and the others are arrested by the Germans and sent to Siegburg Prison, where Lili dies. Upon her release at the end of the war, Eve returns to England, where she refuses to accept the medals that she was awarded for her service because she believes that she doesn't deserve them. She lives on her pension and becomes an alcoholic, working for a time helping people locate family members during World War II. Because her misshapen hands keep her from doing many normal activities, she hires a Scotsman named Finn Kilgore as a cook and driver.

When Charlie finds Eve in 1947, she convinces her and Finn to help her look for her cousin. Eve agrees because Charlie has information that Rose had worked at a restaurant named Le Lethe for someone named René in Limoges. They learn that, during the war, René Bourdelon moved from Lille to Limoges, changed his name to René du Malassis, and opened a restaurant named Le Lethe like the one in Lille. While working at the restaurant, Rose also worked for the French Resistance using the name Hélène Joubert. She was killed by the Nazis in the Oradour-sur-Glane massacre based on information passed on by René.

Bent on vengeance, Eve and Charlie go with Finn to Grasse, where Eve remembers that René owned a villa. They find him there, now retired and using the last name Gautier. Eve shoots René at his villa and plans to kill herself, but Charlie intervenes. She had contacted Violette, who was able to find out from court records that someone named Mlle Tellier had informed on Lili, so Eve was not at fault after all.

In the end, Charlie decides not to have an abortion, marries Finn, and settles down with him in Grasse. Eve goes to France and visits Lili's grave with Violette. She goes on safaris, where she meets people who accept her for what she is, and stays in touch with Charlie, Finn, and her goddaughter Evelyn Rose Kilgore.

== Major themes ==
- Challenges of being a female spy during World War I
- Abortion
- Courageous women
- "Flowers who flourish in evil": references to the volume of poetry Les Fleurs du mal by French poet Charles Baudelaire.

== Background ==
The novel is inspired by the true story of the Alice Network, a group of women spies who worked for the British during World War I in the area of Lille, France, gathering information about German troop movements and battle plans. The characters Lili, Violette, and Cameron are based on historical figures.

== Reception ==
The Alice Network was a New York Times and USA Today bestseller. It was named one of NPR's Best Books of the Year. Matthew Jackson of BookPage declared Kate Quinn to be "one of the best artists" of historical fiction.
