= Schlump (novel) =

1928 semi-autobiographical novel by Hans Herbert Grimm

Schlump. The Story of an Unknown Soldier (Note: Its original German title was Schlump. Geschichten und Abenteuer aus dem Leben des unbekannten Musketiers Emil Schulz, genannt 'Schlump', von ihm selbst erzählt, or Schlump. Stories and adventures from the life of the unknown rifleman Emil Schulz, known as "Schlump", as told by himself. Kurt Wolff published the original edition in Hamburg.) is a 1928 semi-autobiographical novel by the German author Hans Herbert Grimm. Published anonymously by Kurt Wolff, the book relates the experiences of its protagonist, Emil Schulz, known as "Schlump", as a military policeman in German-occupied France during World War I. The work was burnt by the Nazis in 1933 because of its satirical and anti-war tone.

== History and legacy ==
Although briefly acclaimed after its initial publication, the book was almost immediately eclipsed by the success of Erich Maria Remarque's All Quiet on the Western Front, published in 1929. However, it regained momentary popularity in 2013 when Grimm was identified as the author, after his granddaughter reached out to German writer and literary critic Volker Weidermann following his inclusion of the novel in his Book of Burned Books. To that end, in 2015, an English edition was published by the New York Review of Books translated by Jamie Bulloch with an editorial commentary by Weidermann. However, remarking on the novel's waning popularity in 2021, Michael Shindler in the University Bookman notes, "Probably Schlump [...] will soon join that once-celebrated epic poem of the third-century Neoplatonist Zoticus, which told of the death of Atlantis, of which every verse has sunk below the horizon of human memory."

== See also ==
- The Case of Sergeant Grischa (1927)
