= Marie Léonie Vanhoutte =

French secret-agent during World War I (1888–1967)

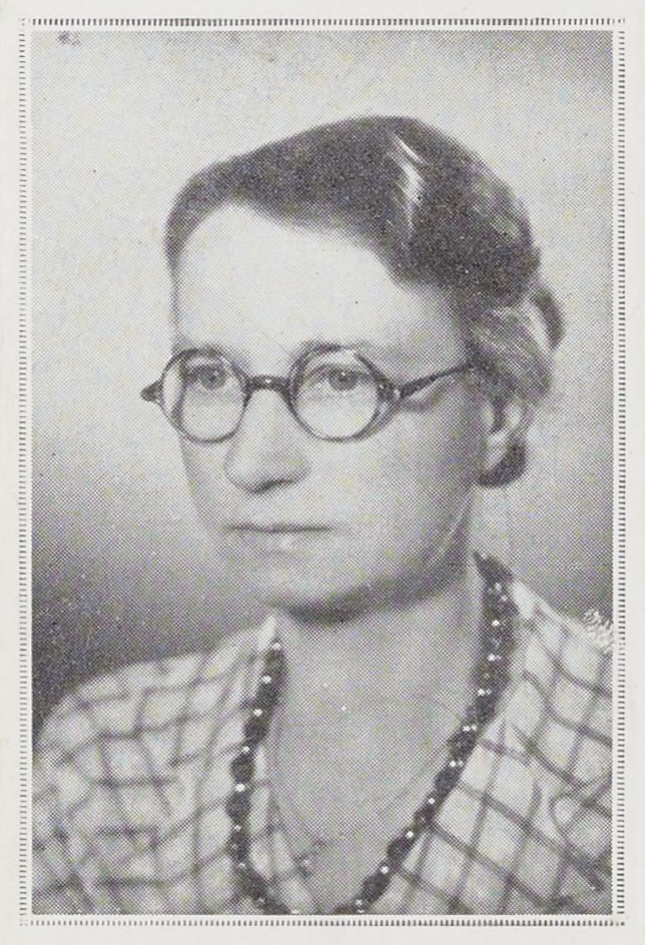
- Vanhoutte (1937)
- Born: 13 January 1888; Roubaix, France
- Died: 4 May 1967 (aged 79); Boulogne-Billancourt, France
- Other names: Charlotte Lameron, Marie-Leonie Vanhoutte, Leonie van Houtte
- Spouse: Antoine Rédier (m. 1934–1954, death)

Marie Léonie Vanhoutte, also known by the pseudonym Charlotte Lameron (1888 – 1967) was a French secret agent during World War I who worked at the French-Belgium border.

== Early life ==
Marie Léonie Vanhoutte was born on 13 January 1888 in Roubaix, France, in a house on Rue de la Vigne.

At the start of World War I, she was a nurse trainee at the Red Cross, but she did not stay long at that role since she did not want to treat the German soldiers medically. She travelled to Flanders to identify the places of passage for resistance networks for the French and the British to cross German lines. In August 1914 Vanhoutte was instrumental at planting ambulances and playing the role of "Charlotte Lameron". There is varying information about her character role, with some sources state "Charlotte" worked as a cheesemonger, but others called her a Red Cross nurse.

== Alice Network ==
She was put in contact with Louise de Bettignies (also known as "Alice Dubois") and they met at Prouvost-Masurel Castle, in Mouvaux. In the spring of 1915, Vanhoutte started to help Bettignies in the Alice Network, also known as the Alice Circle, expand the espionage circuit to the nearby towns of Cambrai, Valenciennes and Saint-Quentin. The networks were geographic areas, divided by sectors, to identify train passages, German troop movements, the location of ammunition stores and information regarding weaponry. They would write reports, code messages and transmit the messages through Belgium and the Netherlands. Vanhoutte was able to travel freely because of the ambulances and couriered the information to each location.

On 24 September 1915, Vanhoutte was arrested, was sent to the Saint-Gilles prison in Brussels and was sentenced to 15 years. The Germans used subterfuge to force Vanhoutte to identify Louise de Bettignies from photographs, which eventually resulting in Bettignies's arrest. When World War I ended in 1918, Vanhoutte was freed from prison.

Vanhoutte married the writer Antoine Rédier on 19 July 1934 in Paris. Attendees at their wedding included Maxime Weygand, André Tardieu and Henri Gouraud.

== Death and legacy ==
Vanhoutte died on 4 May 1967 in Boulogne-Billancourt. She is buried in Hauteville-sur-Mer, where the village square is dedicated to her honour.

In 1937, a film by Léon Poirier featured a Vanhoutte character, Soeurs d'Armes: Film (English: Sisters in Arms: Film). He also published a book related to the film.

The 2017 historical fiction novel The Alice Network also featured a fictionalized version of Vanhoutte as a supporting character.

== Awards ==
- Knight of the Legion of Honour (1927)
- Croix de guerre 1914–1918 (1919)
- Officer of the Legion of Honour (1966)
- Officer of the Order of the British Empire (1918)
