= Kate Quinn =

American author

- Born: Long Beach, California, United States
- Education: Boston University
- Occupation: Novelist
- Writing career
- Language: English
- Genre: Historical fiction
- Notable work: The Alice Network
- Website: www.katequinnauthor.com

Kate Quinn is an American writer known for her works of historical fiction.

== Early life and education ==
Quinn was born and raised in Long Beach, California. She graduated from Boston University with a BA (2004) and a master's degree (2006) in classical voice.

== Writing ==
Quinn's novels often focus on women's underrepresented roles in history.

Her works have been set in several historical eras, including five novels that take place in the Roman Empire, two books about the House of Borgia in the Italian Renaissance, and a series of novels set in the 1940s and 1950s during and after the Second World War.

She has also contributed to a series of historical novels that were collaboratively written with 5-6 other authors, in which each author writes a separate chapter presenting a different character's voice, which together make up a single overlapping story. The first of these, A Day of Fire: A Novel of Pompeii is in development for a limited series from Amazon Studios.

== Reception ==
Quinn's 2017 historical fiction novel, The Alice Network, was a New York Times and USA Today bestseller, and an NPR "Books We Loved" selection. Its 2019 follow-up, The Huntress, earned positive reviews in The Washington Post and Kirkus Reviews, and was also a New York Times bestseller. Her novels The Rose Code and The Diamond Eye were also New York Times bestsellers. In 2024, both The Phoenix Crown and The Briar Club made the NPR "Books We Loved" list. Booklist's starred review noted that The Briar Club is a "compulsively readable" book that would be well received by "those who love woman-led historical fiction with rich, appealing characters". Quinn's most recent novel, The Astral Library, published 2026, marks her first foray into fantasy and magical realism, expanding her genre repertoire beyond historical fiction.

== Personal life ==
Quinn resides with her husband in Maryland.

== Bibliography ==
=== Novels ===
==== The Empress of Rome Series ====
- Mistress of Rome (2010) ISBN 978-0-425-23247-7
- Daughters of Rome (2011) ISBN 978-0-425-23897-4
- Empress of the Seven Hills (2012) ISBN 978-0-425-24202-5
- The Three Fates (2015) ASIN B00TXRB1J0
- Lady of the Eternal City (2015) ISBN 978-0-425-25963-4

==== The Borgia Chronicles ====
- The Serpent and the Pearl (2013) ISBN 978-0-425-25946-7
- The Lion and the Rose (2014) ISBN 978-0-425-26876-6

==== Other novels ====
- The Alice Network (2017) ISBN 978-0-06-265419-9
- The Huntress (2019) ISBN 978-0-06-288434-3
- The Rose Code (2021) ISBN 978-0-06-294347-7
- The Diamond Eye (2022) ISBN 978-0-06-294351-4
- The Briar Club (2024) ISBN 978-0-06-324474-0
- The Astral Library (2026) ISBN 978-0-06-347975-3

=== Collaboratively written novels ===
- A Day of Fire: A Novel of Pompeii (with Stephanie Dray, Sophie Perinot, Ben Kane, and Vicky Alvear Shecter) (2014) ISBN 978-0-9903245-7-7
- A Year of Ravens: A Novel of Boudica's Rebellion (with Ruth Downie, Stephanie Dray, E Knight, Vicky Alvear Shecter, S. J. A. Turney, and Russell Whitfield) (2015) ISBN 978-1-5176-3541-1
- A Song of War: A Novel of Troy (with Christian Cameron, Libbie Hawker, Vicky Alvear Shecter, S. J. A. Turney, Stephanie Thornton, and Russell Whitfield) (2016) ISBN 978-1-5369-3185-3
- Ribbons of Scarlet: A Novel of the French Revolution's Women (with Stephanie Dray, Laura Kamoie, E Knight, Heather Webb, and Sophie Perinot) (2019) ISBN 978-0-06-295219-6
- The Phoenix Crown (with Janie Chang) (2024) ISBN 978-0-06-330473-4
