= Louise de Bettignies =

French secret agent

- Louise de Bettignies before the war
- Born: 15 July 1880; Saint-Amand-les-Eaux, France
- Died: 27 September 1918 (aged 38); Cologne, Germany
- Known for: Espionage

Louise Marie Jeanne Henriette de Bettignies (French pronunciation: [lwiz maʁi ʒan ɑ̃ʁjɛt də betiɲi]; 15 July 1880 - 27 September 1918) was a French secret agent who spied on the Germans for the British during World War I using the pseudonym of Alice Dubois.

She was arrested in October 1915 and imprisoned, dying shortly before the end of the war in captivity.

She was posthumously awarded the Cross of the Legion of Honour, the Croix de guerre 1914-1918 with palm, and the British Military Medal, and she was made an Officer of the Order of the British Empire.

== Family ==
Traces of the Bettignies family date back to 1228. The Lordship of Bettignies was located near the city of Mons in what is now Belgium. There are further traces of the family in 1507.

Peterinck de La Gohelle, de Bettignies’ great-grandfather, originated in Lille. He settled in Tournai in 1752, where he founded a factory of porcelain art on the quai des Salines. The factory was called the imperial and royal factory. In 1787, the Duke of Orleans ordered a magnificent service in blue decor from Tournai of which some pieces are held in the Musée royal de Mariemont.

In 1818, Maximilen Joseph de Bettignies, advocate to the council of Tournai, General Counsel and magistrate, opened a depot at rue du Wacq in Saint-Amand-les-Eaux, which he gave to his son Maximilian.

On 31 July 1818 M.J. de Bettignies filed a patent No. 521 on the paste with which to make large vases of bone china (Brev. d'inv., volume XVI, p. 276).

Tariffs were high, and the deposit became a factory after it had taken over the supply of material for the porcelain maker Fauquez, which he improved. First installed in rue Marion, the factory in 1837 was established at a place called Le Moulin des Loups, on the road to Valenciennes. In 1831, Maximilian Joseph obtained the French nationality. In 1833, he married, in Orchies, Adeline Armande Bocquet, who bore him four children, one of whom was Henri, Louise de Bettignies's father.

In 1866, Henri de Bettignies married Julienne Mabille de Poncheville, from an old family of lawyers in the northern France.

The Mabille family had its origins in the Pas-de-Calais and for several generations had notaries in Valenciennes.

On 30 June 1880, Henry and Maximilian de Bettignies ceded their business to Gustave Dubois and Léandre Bouquiaux. (Note: According to Louise's niece Marguerite de Bettignies, "They were too artistic, too proud to claim their due, for the "big people" of the world were failing to pay their bills, convinced no doubt that for them to order, and thus to recognize the talent of the Bettignies, was a distinction worth all the gold in the world. When the situation proved untenable, they preferred to put the key in the door, rather than letting their workers go unpaid.)

== Education and family ==
Despite her father's financial difficulties, de Bettignies obtained a secondary education in Valenciennes with the Sisters of the Sacred Heart. According to her cousin, André Mabille de Poncheville,

She was six years older than me. I saw her most often at Valenciennes, at the house of our common grandmother, [...] Louise was blonde, frail in appearance, with a mobile face and piercing eyes that seemed to dart in all directions ... It is true that the days when I saw her, when she was about twelve, were her holidays. She was a boarder with her sister, Germaine, at the Convent of the Holy Union of the Sacred Hearts, where the good nuns fed that lively child opinions that were similar to those of her grandmother. However, she worked so as to give them satisfaction.

According to Laure Marie Mabille de Poncheville,

... I still have vivid memories of my cousin from the time we spent at our grandmother's house on rue Capron Street, in Valenciennes ... Louise was then twelve. We were both students of the Dames de la Sainte-Union, she as a boarder and me as a day pupil. She already showed a strong character, playful ... Yes, Louise was very nice, very intelligent and showed a lot of personality. "

Her parents moved in Lille in 1895, but she left in 1898 for England to continue her higher studies with the Ursulines at Upton, Essex, and then with the Ursulines at Wimbledon and Oxford.

After the death of her father in 1903, she returned to Lille, where she graduated in the Faculty of Letters of the University of Lille in 1906. After her studies, she had a perfect mastery of English and a good knowledge of German and Italian.

== Early career ==
She worked as a tutor in Pierrefonds, Oise, and went to Milan, Italy, to the home of Giuseppe Visconti de Modrone. In 1906, when she was with the Viscontis, she travelled extensively throughout Italy. In 1911, she went to Count Mikiewsky, (Note: According to note 16 on page 29 of the book by René Deruyk, she was related to Adam Mickiewicz (1798-1855).) near Lemberg (Lviv), in Galicia. From 1911 to 1912, she was with Prince Carl Schwarzenberg, at the Orlík Castle.

She then moved to the Princess Elvira of Bavaria, at the Holeschau Castle, Austria-Hungary (now Moravia, Czech Republic). She is supposed to have met Rupprecht of Bavaria during her trip in 1915. It was there that she was offered the position of tutor of the children of Archduke Franz Ferdinand, the heir to the Austro-Hungarian throne. She declined the offer and returned to France.

Back in Lille in early 1914, where she was operated on for appendicitis, she went to her brother's home in Bully-les-Mines.

At the outbreak of the war, Louise lived in a villa at Wissant that was rented by her brother Albert.

== World War I ==
Before August was over, Louise left Wissant and returned to Saint-Omer. From there, she took the pretext of joining her sister Germaine, whose husband, Maurice Houzet was mobilized, to go to Lille.

=== Context in Lille ===
On 1 August 1914, Adolphe Messimy, Minister of War, suppressed, with the approval of René Viviani, President of the Council, the position of governor of Lille. He had exceeded his rights, as the decommissioning should have been enacted by law. Lille was then declared an "open city" (its fortifications were decommissioned in 1910) and the staff was evacuated on 24 August. On 22 August, after German patrols were seen in the vicinity of Lille, General Percin installed a 75 mm gun in front of each drawbridge of the Citadel. This initiative provoked the wrath of Charles Delesalle, the mayor, and of advocates of non-defense. Faced with this, Pervin retreated. Behind the back of the prefect, the supporters of non-defense created new initiatives to disarm the city. On August 24, the Staff evacuated Lille.

During this turbulent period, the government yielded to fear. The prefect Felix Trepont was ordered to retreat with the administrative and postal services to Dunkirk. Then a few days later, he was given a counter-order. Upon his return, the prefect found the offices of military buildings open to all the winds and the equipment abandoned. On 27 August Trepont asked John Vandenbosch, an industrialist, to move all military equipment to Dunkirk. Transport lasted for 21 days, and 278 trains were needed. On 2 September, the Germans entered the city, then departed after extorting ransom. They returned several times. On 4 October, a detachment of Wahnschaffe stumbled on a battalion of Chasseurs on foot, resting in the city. Taken aback, they retreated, burning some houses in the suburb of Fives.

Lille was invaded by a crowd of refugees. Until October 9, there was confusion in both prefecture and in the city.

On October 9, the commander Felix de Pardieu and his territorials were ordered to retreat in the region of Neuve-Chapelle, leaving Lille without defender. General Ferdinand Foch, who arrived on the night of 4 to 5 October, warned by the prefect, sent commander Pardieu back towards Lille under the protection of the 20th Regiment of mounted chasseurs. Delayed by the crowd, the ammunition convoy was attacked by a detachment of General Georg von der Marwitz. Tired of waiting for the start of the British offensive, Foch dispatched the cavalry corps of commander Conneau to Lille. On the stroke of noon on 12 October, Lille heard the gunfire coming closer. The corps of Conneau engaged in a famous battle, but did not persist, believing that Lille had succumbed. Surrounding the city, the Germans had between 50,000 and 80,000 men, facing a motley band of 2,795 men composed of chasseurs, goumiers and especially territorials, armed with a battery of artillery, with three 75mm guns and little ammunition.

=== Under fire ===
Louise and Germaine lived together at 166 rue d'Isly.

From 4 to 13 October 1914, by turning the only cannon that the Lille troops had, the defenders succeeded in deceiving the enemy and holding them for several days under an intense battle that destroyed more than 2,200 buildings and houses, particularly in the area of the station. Louise, moving through the ruins of Lille, ensured the supply of ammunition and food to the soldiers who were still firing on the attackers. In makeshift hospitals, she wrote letters in German dictated by dying Germans to their families.

=== Espionage service: the Alice Network ===
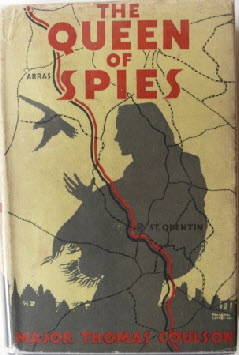
Cover of the book "The queen of spies" by Major Thomas Coulson

After the German army invaded Lille in October 1914, de Bettignies began carrying messages from people who were trapped there to and from their relatives in unoccupied France. She did this by writing them in lemon juice on a petticoat. Once at her destination, she ironed the petticoat to make the messages visible and cut them apart for delivery. Impressed by her cleverness and her language skills, officers of both the French and English intelligence agencies tried to recruit her. She decided to work for the British, who gave her the pseudonym Alice Dubois and helped her set up an intelligence network of some one hundred people.

The Alice Network provided important information to the British by way of occupied Belgium and the Netherlands. It is estimated that the network saved the lives of more than a thousand British soldiers during its 9 months of full operation from January to September 1915.

The network, which operated within forty kilometers of the front to the west and east of Lille, was so effective that she was nicknamed by her English superiors "the queen of spies." Starting in spring 1915, de Bettignies worked closely with Marie Léonie Vanhoutte, alias Charlotte Lameron.

De Bettignies smuggled men to England, provided valuable information to the Intelligence Service, and prepared for her superiors in London a grid map of the region around Lille. When the German army installed a new battery of artillery, the intelligence she provided allowed this camouflaged position to be bombed by the Royal Flying Corps within eight days.

Another opportunity allowed her to report the date and time of passage of the imperial train carrying the Kaiser on a secret visit to the front at Lille. During the approach to Lille, two British aircraft bombed the train and emerged, but missed their target. The German command did not understand the unique situation of these forty kilometers of "cursed" front (held by the British) out of nearly seven hundred miles of front.

One of her last messages announced the preparation of a massive German attack on Verdun in early 1916. The information was relayed to the French commander, but unfortunately, he refused to believe it.

Arrested by the Germans on 20 October 1915 near Tournai, she was sentenced to death on 16 March 1916 in Brussels. Her sentence was later commuted to forced labor for life. After being held for three years, she died on 27 September 1918 as a result of pleural abscesses poorly operated upon at St. Mary's Hospital in Cologne.

Her body was repatriated on 21 February 1920. On 16 March 1920 a funeral was held in Lille in which she was posthumously awarded the Cross of the Legion of Honor, the Croix de guerre 1914-1918 with palm, and the British Military Medal, and she was made an Officer of the Order of the British Empire. She is buried in the cemetery of Saint-Amand-les-Eaux.

== Tributes ==
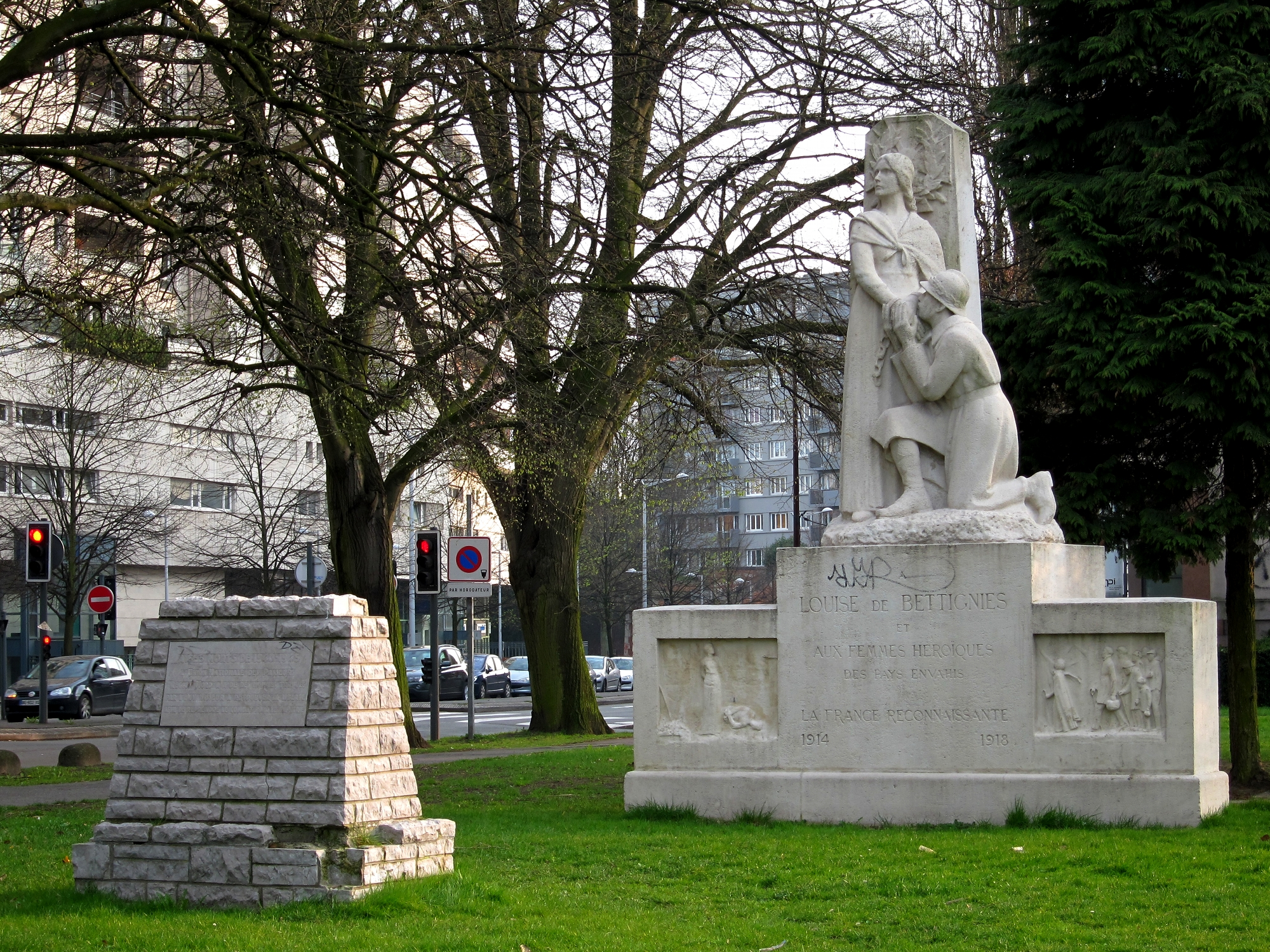
Monument to Louise de Bettignies in Lille

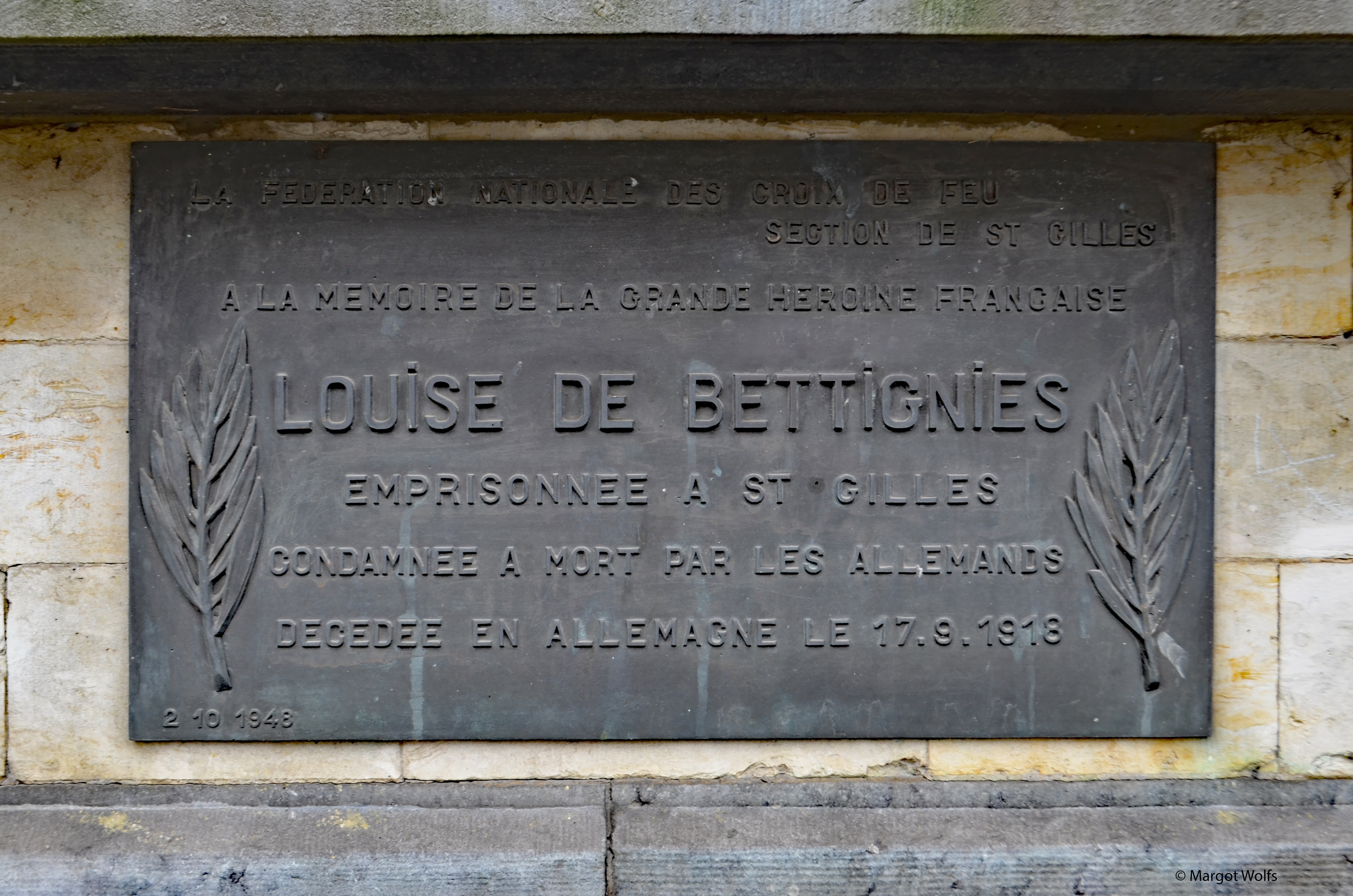
- In memory of Louise de Bettignies; in front of the prison of St. Gilles, Brussels, Belgium
  In Lille, there is a monument to Louise de Bettignies that includes a statue of her with a soldier kneeling and kissing her hand.
- In 2008, a small museum was established in her birthplace, rue Louise de Bettignies (formerly Rue de Conde) in Saint-Amand-les-Eaux. As of October 2021, a large portrait of de Bettignies was scheduled to be finished on the outside of the building, which was being converted to a resource center devoted to the emancipation of women.
- Several French towns have named streets, schools and other structures after her, for example, the school where Françoise Sagan studied (and was expelled from).
- De Bettignies is a secondary character in Kate Quinn's book The Alice Network, published in 2017.

== Sources ==
- "Alice". Pays du Nord (84). June–July 2008.
- "André Mabille de Poncheville (23 May 1886 - 20 May 1969)". La Voix du Nord. 30 September 1967.
- Bettignies, Bertin de (13 August 2008). "De Bettignies Louise (1880 - 1918)".
- Deruyk, René (1998). Louise de Bettignies: résistante lilloise (1880-1918). la Voix du Nord. ISBN 978-2-84393-007-2.
- "Madame Delcourt, née Laure Marie Mabille de Poncheville(1882-1977)". La Voix du Nord. 28 September 1968.
- Redier, Antoine (1924). La guerre des femmes (PDF). Paris: Éditions de la vrai France. (2nd edition 1946)
