= The Bread Peddler =

The Bread Peddler (French:La porteuse de pain or Italian:La Portatrice di pane) may refer to:

- The Bread Peddler (novel), an 1884 novel by the French writer Xavier de Montépin
- The Bread Peddler (1916 film), an Italian silent film
- The Bread Peddler (1923 film), a French silent film
- The Bread Peddler (1934 film), a French film
- The Bread Peddler (1950 film), a French-Italian film
- The Bread Peddler (1963 film), a French-Italian film
- The Bread Peddler (TV series), a 1973 French television adaptation

== See also ==
- The Bread Seller Woman, a 1965 Turkish film adaptation
