= Xavier de Montépin =

French novelist

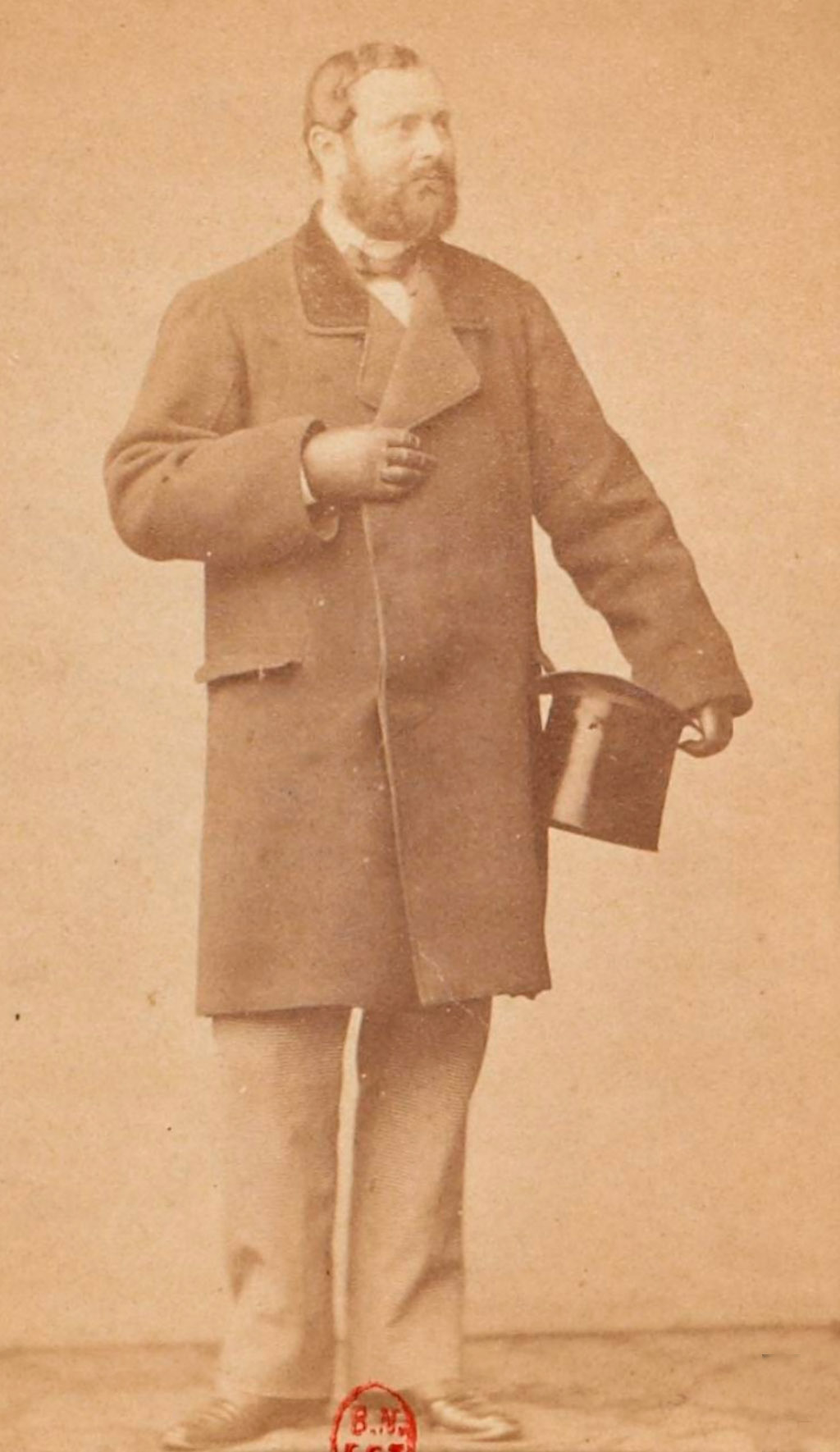
Xavier de Montépin c.1855

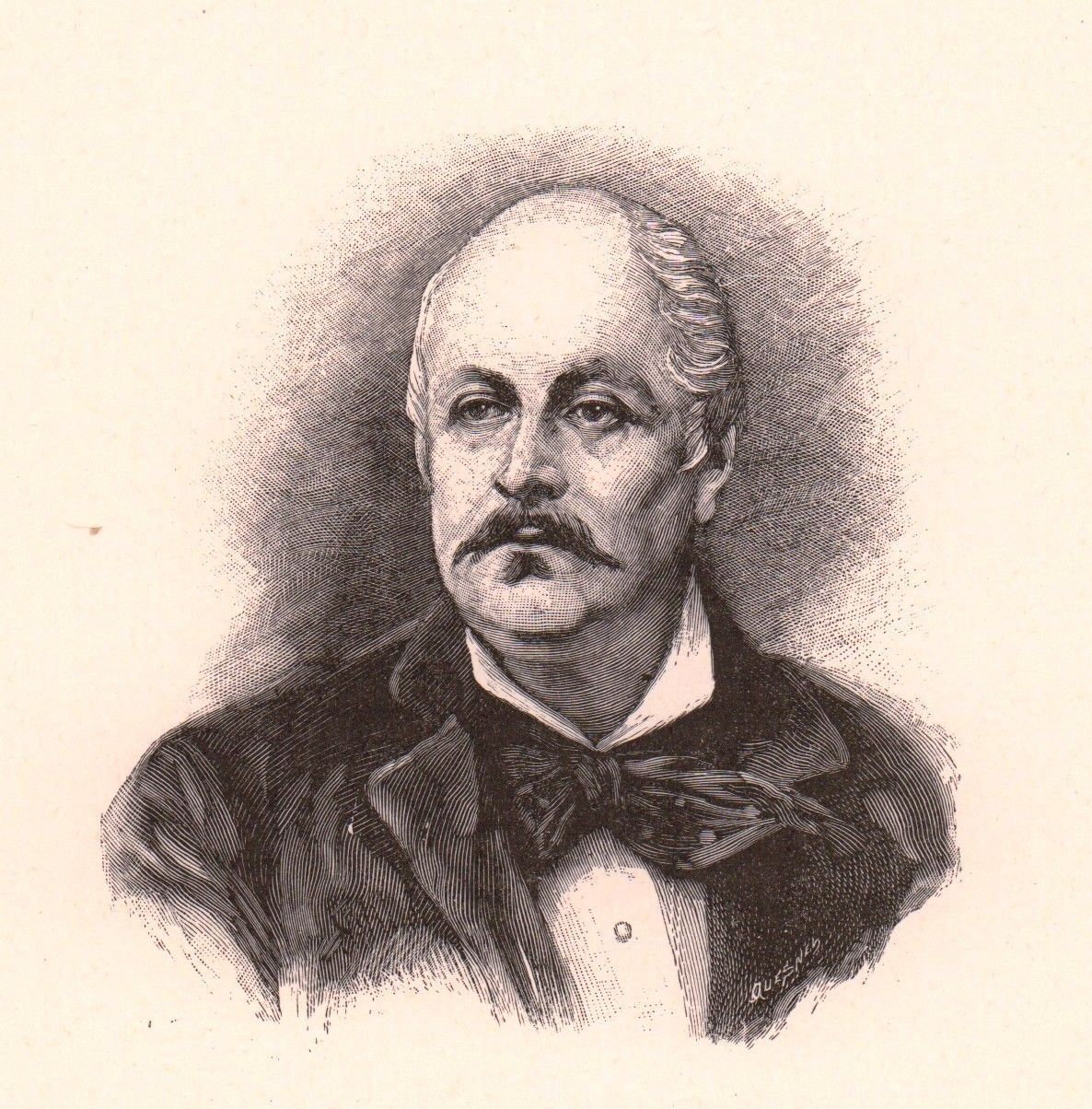
Engraving of Xavier de Montépin by Joseph Uzanne, 1899.

Xavier Henri Aymon Perrin, Count of Montépin (10 March 1823 in Apremont, Haute-Saône – 30 April 1902 in Paris) was a popular French novelist.

The author of serialised novels (feuilletons) and popular plays, he is best known for the 19th-Century best-seller, La Porteuse de pain (The Bread Peddler), which was first published in Le Petit Journal, from 1884 to 1889, and underwent many adaptations for theatre, film and television.

Le Médecin des pauvres (Physician to the Poor), appeared in 1861 and was the subject of a plagiarism suit by author Louis-Étienne Jousserandot. Although the evidence was strongly in favour of Jousserandot, neither party prevailed and both parties were ordered to pay the court costs.

Les Filles de plâtre (The Daughters of the Plasterer), appearing in 1855, was condemned as obscene and Perrin was tried and sentenced to three months in prison and a fine of 500 Francs.

== Selected works ==
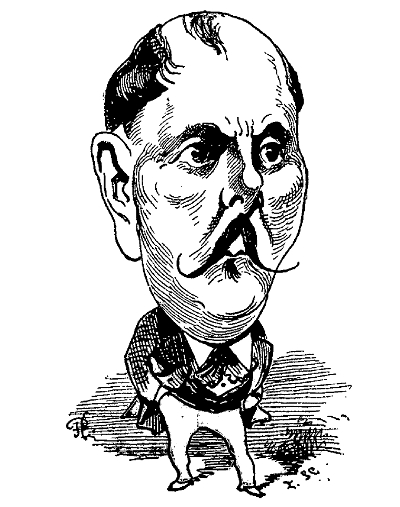
Caricature of Xavier de Montépin from Le Trombinoscope 1875

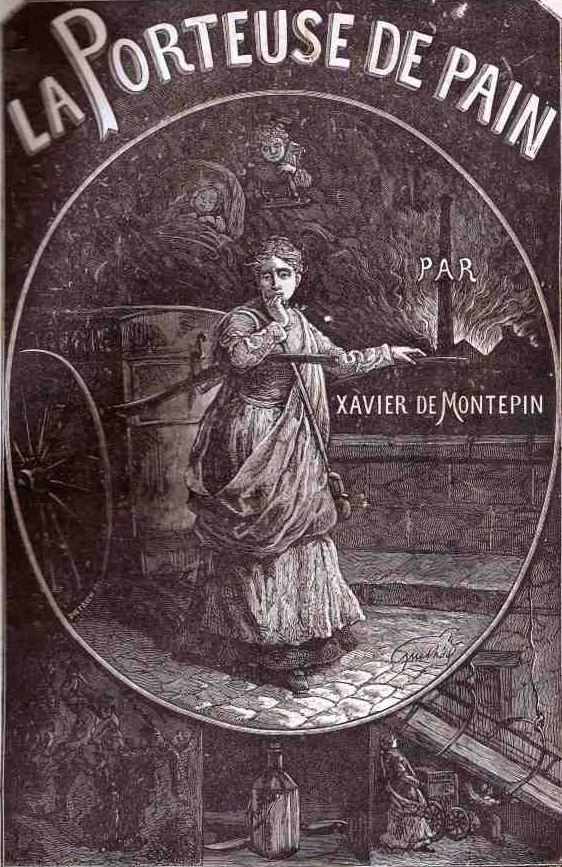
La Porteuse de pain

- Les Chevaliers du lansquenet (The Knights of the Lansquenet, 1847) (with the Marquis Théodore de Foudras (1800–1872))
- Les Amours d'un fou (The Love-Affairs of a Fool, 1849)
- Les Confessions d'un bohême (The Confessions of a Bohemian, 1849)
- Les Filles du saltimbanque (1849)
- Brelan de dames (Three of a Kind, 1850)
- La Baladine (1851)
- Le Loup noir (The Black Wolf, 1851)
- Geneviève Galliot (1852)
- Les Viveurs de Paris (The Pleasure-Seekers of Paris, 1852)
- L'Épée du commandeur (The Sword of the Commander, 1852)
- L'Auberge du Soleil d'or (The Inn of the Golden Sun, 1853)
- Un gentilhomme de grand chemin (A Nobleman of the High Road, 1853)
- Les Valets de cœur (The Knaves of Hearts, 1853)
- Mademoiselle Lucifer (1853)
- Les Filles de plâtre (The Daughters of the Plasterer, 1855)
- La Perle du Palais-royal (The Pearl of the Royal Palace, 1855)
- Le Château des fantômes (The Haunted Château, 1855)
- Les Filles de plâtre. Les trois débuts (1856)
- La Syrène (The Siren, 1856)
- Les Deux Bretons (The Two Bretons, 1857)
- Le Masque rouge (The Red Mask, 1858)
- L'Officier de fortune (1858)
- Les Pécheresses – Pivoine et Mignonne (The Fishwives – Pivoine and Mignonne, 1858)
- Les Viveurs de province (The Pleasure-Seekers of the Province, 1859)
- La Comtesse Marie (The Countess Marie, 1859)
- Le Château de Piriac (1859)
- La Maison rose (The Pink House, 1859)
- Les Chevaliers du poignard (1860)
- La Fille du maître d'école (1860)
- Les Marionnettes du diable (1860)
- Un Mystère de famille (The Family Mystery, 1860)
- Le Compère Leroux (1860)
- Une Fleur aux enchères (1860)
- Le Médecin des pauvres (Physician to the Poor, 1861)
- Le Parc aux biches (1862)
- Les Compagnons de la torche (1862)
- Les Métamorphoses du crime (1863)
- L'Amour d'une pécheresse (1864)
- L'Héritage d'un millionnaire (1864)
- Le Drame de Maisons-Lafitte (1864)
- Les Pirates de la Seine (1864)
- Les Amours de Vénus (1864)
- Bob le pendu (1864)
- Les Mystères du Palais-royal (1865)
- La Fille du meurtrier (1866)
- Le Moulin rouge (1866)
- La Sirène (1866)
- La Maison maudite (1867)
- La Femme de Paillasse. La Voyante (1873)
- L'Amant d'Alice (1873)
- La Comtesse de Nancey (1873)
- Le Mari de Marguerite (1873)
- Les Confessions de Tullia (1873)
- La Voyante (1873)
- Le Bigame (1874)
- Le Pendu (1874)
- Les Enfers de Paris (1874)
- La Maîtresse du mari (1876)
- Les Tragédies de Paris (1876)
- La Sorcière rouge (1876)
- L'Agent de police (1877)
- La Traite des blanches (1877)
- La Bâtarde (1877)
- Deux Amies de Saint-Denis (1878)
- La Femme de Paillasse (1878)
- Le Médecin des folles (1879)
- La Dame de pique (1879)
- Le Médecin des folles (1879)
- Le Fiacre Nº 13 (1880)
- Les Filles de bronze (1880)
- Le Dernier des Courtenay (1880)
- La Fille de Marguerite (1881)
- Son Altesse l'Amour (1881)
- Mam'zelle Mélie (1881)
- Madame de Trèves (1882)
- Les Pantins de madame le Diable (1882)
- Le Dernier Duc d'Hallali (1883)
- La Porteuse de pain (The Bread Peddler, 1884–1887)
- Deux Amours : Hermine (1885)
- Deux Amours : Odille (1885)
- Le Testament rouge (1888)
- Le Marchand de diamants (1889)
- Marâtre : la fille du fou (1889)
- Le Marchand de diamants (1889)
- Le Mariage de Lascars (1889)
- Les Drames de l'épée (1890)
- La Dame aux émeraudes (The Lady in Emeralds, 1891)
- Les Conquêtes de Narcisse Mistral (1894)
- La Demoiselle de compagnie (1900)
- Chanteuse des rues (The Street Singer, 1900)
- Le Marquis d'Espinchal (?)

== Filmography ==
- The Bread Peddler, directed by Romolo Bacchini (1911, based on the novel La Porteuse de pain)
- The Bread Peddler, directed by Georges Denola (1912, short film, based on the novel La Porteuse de pain)
- Sa Majesté l'argent, directed by Adrien Caillard (1914, short film, based on the novel Sa Majesté l'argent)
- Paolina, directed by Vitale De Stefano (1915, based on the play Pauline)
- Les Filles du saltimbanque, directed by Georges Tréville (1915, based on the novel Les Filles du saltimbanque)
- The Bread Peddler, directed by Giovanni Enrico Vidali (1916, based on the novel La Porteuse de pain)
- La Joueuse d'orgue, directed by Georges Denola (1916, based on the novel La Joueuse d'orgue)
- Il fiacre n. 13, directed by Alberto Capozzi and Gero Zambuto (1917, based on the novel Le Fiacre Nº 13)
- Le Secret de la comtesse, directed by Georges Denola (1917, based on the novel Le Secret de la comtesse)
- Il medico delle pazze, directed by Mario Roncoroni (1919, based on the novel Le Médecin des folles)
- Il Ventriloquo, directed by Guido Brignone (1920, based on the novel Le Ventriloque)
- Die Maske des Todes, directed by James Bauer (Germany, 1920)
- Tre milioni di dote, directed by Camillo De Riso (1920, based on the novel Trois millions de dot)
- Canaglia dorata, directed by Achille Consalvi (1921)
- The Bread Peddler, directed by René Le Somptier (1923, based on the novel La Porteuse de pain)
- La Mendiante de Sainte-Sulpice, directed by Charles Burguet (1924, based on the novel La Mendiante de Sainte-Sulpice)
- La Joueuse d'orgue, directed by Charles Burguet (1925, based on the novel La Joueuse d'orgue)
- Cab No. 13, directed by Michael Curtiz (Germany, 1926, based on the novel Le Fiacre Nº 13)
- The Bread Peddler, directed by René Sti (1934, based on the novel La Porteuse de pain)
- La Joueuse d'orgue, directed by Gaston Roudès (1936, based on the novel La Joueuse d'orgue)
- El médico de las locas, directed by Alfonso Patiño Gómez (Mexico, 1944, based on the novel Le Médecin des folles)
- Cab Number 13, directed by Mario Mattoli and Raoul André (1948, based on the novel Le Fiacre Nº 13)
- The Bread Peddler, directed by Maurice Cloche (1950, based on the novel La Porteuse de pain)
- بائعة الخبذ، فيلم بإخراج حسن الامام، وبطولة امينة رزق، وشادية وماجدة وشكري سرحان

وسليمان نجيب، زكي رستم،وعمر الحريري، وحسين رياض

La vendeuse de pain, film égyptien adapté en 1953, dirigé par Hassan El-Imam, avec Amina Rizk, Shadia, Omar El-Hariri, Hussein Riad, Magda, Shoukry Sarhan et Zaki Rostom.

The bread peddler, 1953 film, directed by Hassan El-Imam, starring Amina Rezk, Shadia, Omar el Hariry, Hussein Riad, Magda, Shoukry Sarhan, and Zaki Rostom.

- The Bread Peddler, directed by Maurice Cloche (1963, based on the novel La Porteuse de pain)
- The Bread Seller Woman, directed by Zafer Davutoğlu (Turkey, 1965, based on the novel La Porteuse de pain)
- The Bread Seller Woman, directed by Mehmet Dinler (Turkey, 1972, based on the novel La Porteuse de pain)
