= The Bread Peddler (novel) =

1884 novel by Xavier de Montépin

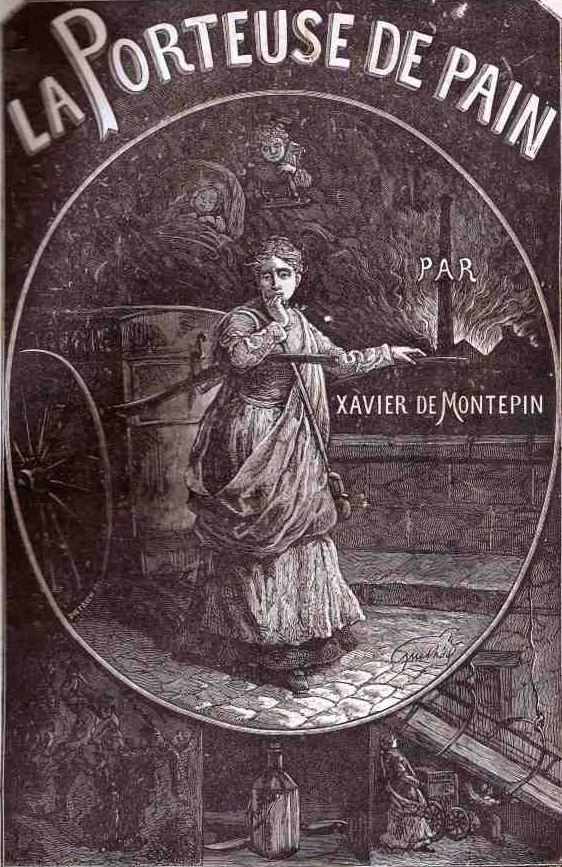
- Author: Xavier de Montépin
- Language: French
- Publication date: 1884
- Publication place: France
- Media type: Print

The Bread Peddler (French:La porteuse de pain) is an 1884 novel by the French writer Xavier de Montépin. It has been turned into a number of films and television adaptations.

== Films ==
- The Bread Peddler, directed by Romolo Bacchini (1911)
- The Bread Peddler, directed by Giovanni Enrico Vidali (1916)
- The Bread Peddler, directed by René Le Somptier (1923)
- The Bread Peddler, directed by René Sti (1934)
- The Bread Peddler, directed by Maurice Cloche (1950)
- The Bread Peddler, directed by Maurice Cloche (1963)
- The Bread Seller Woman, directed by Zafer Davutoğlu (Turkey, 1965)
- The Bread Seller Woman, directed by Mehmet Dinler (Turkey, 1972)

== Television series ==
- The Bread Peddler, directed by Marcel Camus (1973)

== Bibliography ==
- Goble, Alan. The Complete Index to Literary Sources in Film. Walter de Gruyter, 1999.
