= Samuel-Henri Berthoud =

French writer and journalist (1804–1891)

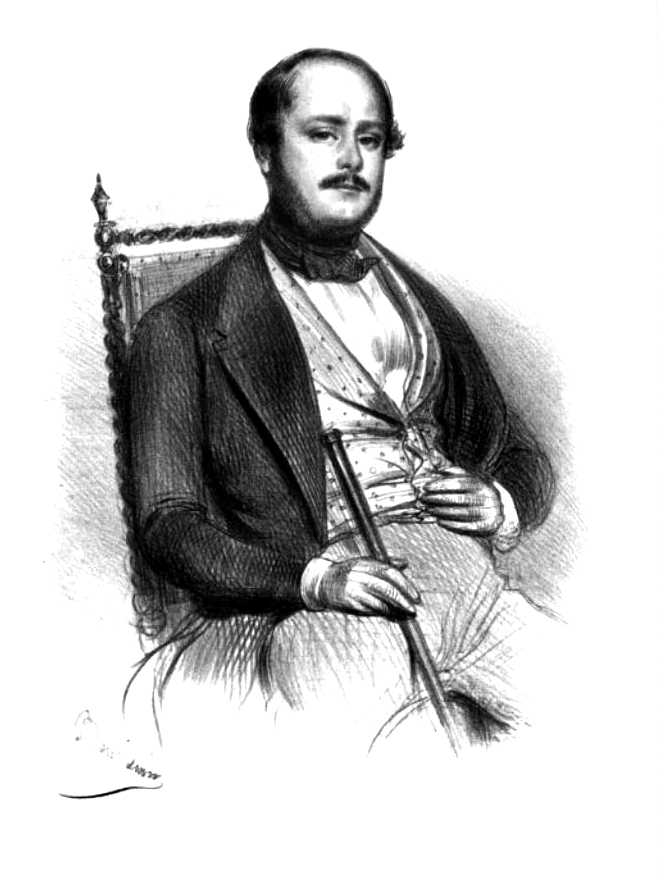
- Portrait of Berthoud, 1840
- Born: 19 January 1804; Cambrai, Hauts-de-France, France
- Died: 26 March 1891 (aged 87); Paris, France
- Occupations: Writer journalist

Samuel-Henri Berthoud (19 January 1804 – 26 March 1891) was a 19th-century French writer, journalist, and popular science writer for youth.

== Biographie ==
The son of a printer and bookseller of his hometown, after his studies on a scholarship at College d'Anchin, Berthoud wrote the newspaper his father had founded in 1828, the Gazette de Cambrai, and inserted there serials that were noticed and made him admit to major literary magazines, the Revue des deux Mondes, la Patrie (under the pen name " Sam "), la Mode etc. He was chief editor of the Musée des familles then of the Mercure de France, in which he wrote extensively.

At the same time, he instituted in his hometown of Cambrai, free courses of health, anatomy, business law, and undertook himself to teach literature. He completed his collection Chroniques et traditions surnaturelles de la Flandre, launched at that time, which he eventually brought to 3 volumes (1831–1834).

Marble bust from 1876 by Édouard Houssin, Musée de la Chartreuse.

Berthoud was not only a prolific writer: all his works start from a given morality, and his style is not lacking in verve. Among other works he published:

- 1831: Contes misanthropiques, in-8°;
- 1832: la Sœur de lait du vicaire, in-8°, first title was Bah !;
- 1833: le Cheveu du diable, (2 vol.), légende fantastique;
- 1834: Mater dolorosa, (2 vol.);
- 1837: l’Honnête homme, in-8°);
- 1840: Pierre-Paul Rubens, (2 vol.), first inserted in Musée des familles;
- 1842: la Bague antique, (4 vol.), novel in two series;
- 1843: Berthe Frémicourt, (2 vol.);
- 1843: l’Enfant sans mère, (2 vol.);
- 1844: le Fils du rabbin, (2 vol.);
- 1845: Daniel, 2 vol.), family tale;
- 1845: la Palette d’or;
- 1847: la Mare du diable;
- 1848: El-Hioudi, 4 vol.), études de mœurs algériennes;
- 1850:le Zéphyr d’El-Arouch, published in the paper le Pays.

For youth, he specifically wrote la France historique, industrielle et pittoresque (1835–1837. 3 vol.), and several volumes of the collection Petits livres de M. le curé (1844–1850), and also une Bonne qu’on renvoie, comédie en vaudevilles given in 1851 at the Théâtre des Variétés.

An amator of the game of dominoes, Berthoud was a member of the club of Dominotiers founded circa 1838 in Paris by the sculptor Dantan le Jeune. In 1848, another dominotier, Louis Jousserandot, wrote in tribute to Dominotiers and dominoes an epistle to Dantan le Jeune and Berthoud, dated Paris, 15 February 1848. It is available on line on the site Gallica of the BNF.

Berthoud was made a chevalier of the Légion d'honneur on 1 September 1844 and promoted an officer on 14 August 1867.

== Bibliography ==
- Denis Legros, Daniel Raichvarg, Le Chêne, l'Os et la Goutte d'eau : aventures et mésaventures du récit scientifique Romantisme 1989, volume n°65 p. 81–92 online
- Florian Balduc (éd.), Fantaisies Hoffmaniennes, Editions Otrante, 2016
