= Louis-Étienne =

Louis-Étienne is a French given name. Notable people with the name include:

- Louis-Étienne Héricart de Thury (1776–1854), French politician and man of science
- Louis-Étienne de Thouvenin (1791–1882), French Army general
- Louis Étienne Arthur Dubreuil, vicomte de La Guéronnière (1816–1875), French politician and aristocrat
- Louis-Étienne Parent (1875–1960), Liberal party member of the House of Commons of Canada
- Louis Étienne Ravaz (1863–1937), French specialist of ampelography
- Louis-Étienne Ricard (1740–1814), French politician
- Louis-Étienne Jousserandot (1813–1887), French prefect
