= Le p'tit Parigot =

1926 film

- Directed by: René Le Somptier
- Screenplay by: Paul Cartoux, Henri Decoin
- Story by: Paul Cartoux
- Produced by: Les Films Luminor
- Cinematography: Henri Barreyre, Léon Morizet
- Production company: Les Films Luminor
- Release date: 1926
- Running time: 331 minutes (6 parts)
- Country: France

Part 1

Part 2

Part 3

Part 4

Part 5

Part 6

Le p'tit Parigot (The Small Parisian One) is a 1926 French movie serial in six parts.

It was directed by René Le Somptier and starred Georges Biscot.
Costume design was by Sonia Delaunay and Philippe et Gaston.

- Part 1: "Première Epoque" (1 h 42 min)
- Part 2: "La Belle Inconnue" (47min)
- Part 3: "Le Complot" (49min)
- Part 4: "Le Mystere du Val d'Enfer" (47min)
- Part 5: "Zarka la Sorciere" (46min)
- Part 6: "La Loi des Jeunes" (40min)

== Cast ==
Actor	Role	Part 1	Part 2	Part 3	Part 4	Part 5	Part 6
Marcel Achard	(caméo)	*					
Georges Biscot	Georges Grigny-Latour (le P'tit Parigot)	*	*	*	*	*	*
Marquisette Bosky	Lucy Mesnil	*	*	*	*	*	*
Bouboule	Bouboule, Lucy's sister		*	*	*	*	*
Pauline Carton	La tante Prudence	*	*		*		*
Henri-Amédée Charpentier	M. Mesnil, Lucy's father		*		*		*
Suzanne Christy	Miss Suzanne, Georges' sister	*	*		*		*
André Dubosc	Mister Anicet Grigny-Latour	*	*		*		*
Suzanne Lenglen	(caméo)	*					
Yves du Manoir	(caméo)	*					
Jeanne Marie-Laurent	Mme Grigny-Latour	*	*				*
Georges Melchior	Robert de Monterval	*	*	*	*	*	*
Violetta Napierska	Gilberte d'Aragon	*		*		*	*
Georges Pelletier-Doisy	(caméo, Pivolo)	*					
Gabrielle Rosny	Sidonie alias Bécassine		*				*
Suzanne Wurtz	(caméo)			*		*	
