= Chinese Quarter (film) =

1947 film

- Directed by: René Sti
- Written by: Robert Bibal
- Starring: Michèle Alfa; Sessue Hayakawa; Alfred Adam
- Cinematography: René Colas
- Edited by: Marcelle Driguet
- Music by: Marcel Landowski
- Production company: Codo Cinéma
- Distributed by: Films Cristal
- Release date: 7 March 1947
- Running time: 90 minutes
- Country: France
- Language: French

Chinese Quarter (French: Quartier chinois) is a 1947 French crime film directed by René Sti and starring Michèle Alfa, Sessue Hayakawa and Alfred Adam. The film's sets were designed by the art director Louis Le Barbenchon.

== Synopsis ==
A female singer becomes involved with an opium-smuggling gang.

== Cast ==
- Michèle Alfa as Nata
- Sessue Hayakawa as Tchang
- Alfred Adam as Léo Seller
- Paul Azaïs as Toni
- Robert Pizani as Le chef de la police
- Martine Lancel as La boutiquière
- Bernard Amiot
- René Marc
- Raymondis
- Marie-Thérèse Teng

== Bibliography ==
- Alfred Krautz. International directory of cinematographers set- and costume designers in film. Saur, 1983.
