= İzzet Günay =

Turkish actor

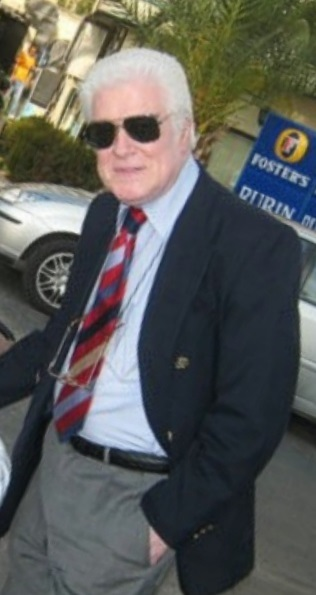
- Born: 21 August 1934 (age 91); Üsküdar, Istanbul, Turkey
- Occupation: Actor
- Years active: 1957–2005

İzzet Günay (born 21 August 1934) is Turkish film and stage actor. He is one of the most experienced and well-known Turkish actors with appearances in more than 100 films across six decades.

== Biography ==
Günay studied at Haydarpaşa High School and Deniz High School. He worked at the İstanbul Municipal Public Works department and then in the lignite business.

Günay answered a casting call in a newspaper and ended up being cast in Haldun Dormen's play Kara Ağaçlar Altında. He then appeared in several other plays such as Sokak Kızı İrma, and Pasifik Şarkısı Zafer Madalyası.

In 1959, Günay made his film debut in the Kemal Film production Kırık Plak as Zeki Müren's driver. After a number of small roles, he landed the main role in Varan Bir. For a short time, he had a musical career in classical music. He won the Best Actor award at the Antalya Golden Orange Festival for his role in Ağaçlar Ayakta Ölür in 1964.

== Filmography ==
- Aşka Sürgün - 2005
- Yadigar - 2004
- Bay E - 1995
- Unutulmayanlar - 1981
- Renkli Dünya - 1980
- Güngörmüşler - 1976
- Duyun Beni - 1975
- Kısmet - 1974
- Felek - 1973
- Çapkınlar Şahı / Don Juan 72 1972
- Kader Yolcuları - 1972
- Aşk Ve Cinayet Meleği - 1972
- Aşkım Kaderim Oldu - 1972
- Kefenin Cebi Yok Fırtına - 1972
- O Ağacın Altında - 1972
- Suya Düşen Hayal - 1972
- Hedefte Beş Adam - 1972
- Kaderin Esiriyiz - 1972
- Hayat Mı Bu - 1972
- Anneler Ve Kızları - 1971
- İki Belalı Adam - 1971
- Katil Kim - 1971
- Silahlar Konuşuyor - 1971
- Yarın Ağlayacağım - 1971
- Kezban Paris'te - 1971
- Ali Cengiz Oyunu - 1971
- Genç Kızlar Pansiyonu - 1971
- Gizli Aşk - 1971
- Katiller - 1971
- Bebek Gibi Maşallah - 1971
- Birleşen Yollar - 1970
- Kara Dutum - 1970
- Red Kit - 1970
- Duyduk Duymadık Demeyin - 1970
- Şıllık - 1970
- Günahsız Katiller - 1970
- Kanunsuz Kardeşler - 1970
- Şoför Nebahat - 1970
- Aşk Yarışı - 1969
- Esmerin Tadı Sarışının Adı - 1969
- Seninle Ölmek İstiyorum - 1969
- Şahane İntikam - 1969
- Asi Kabadayı - 1969
- Cesur Kabadayı - 1969
- Garibanlar Mahallesi - 1969
- Kadın Paylaşılmaz - 1969
- Tatlı Günler - 1969
- Fakir Kızı Leyla - 1969
- İncili Çavuş - 1968
- Affedilmeyen Suç - 1968
- Menderes Köprüsü - 1968
- Kara Atmaca'nın İntikamı - 1968
- Atlı Karınca Dönüyor - 1968
- Kezban - 1968
- Vesikalı Yarim - 1968
- Arkadaşımın Aşkısın (Kan Kardeşim) - 1968
- Kader Böyle İstedi - 1968
- Kalbimdeki Yabancı - 1968
- Dolmuş Şoförü - 1967
- Ağlayan Kadın - 1967
- Düşman Aşıklar - 1967
- Hayat Acıları - 1967
- Hırçın Kadın - 1967
- Kederli Günlerim - 1967
- Sefiller - 1967
- Kara Kartal (1) - 1967
- Zalimler De Sever - 1967
- Kara Atmaca - 1967
- Ayrılık Saati - 1967
- Kardeş Kavgası - 1967
- Kanlı Mezar - 1966
- Namus Kanla Yazılır - 1966
- Yumrukların Kanunu - 1966
- Ailenin Yüz Karası - 1966
- Tehlikeli Oyun - 1966
- Çeşmemeydanlı Ali - 1966
- Fakir Ve Mağrur - 1966
- Şeref Kavgası - 1966
- Akşam Güneşi - 1966
- Ümit Sokağı - 1966
- Ay Yıldız Fedaileri - 1966
- Beyoğlu Esrarı - 1966
- Kumarbaz - 1965
- Yabancı Olduk Şimdi - 1965
- Cici Kızlar - 1965
- Gurbet Türküsü - 1965
- Kolla Kendini Bebek - 1965
- Sevdalı Kabadayı - 1965
- Yalancı - 1965
- Nazar Değmez İnşallah - 1965
- Şeker Hafiye - 1965
- Eller Yukarı - 1965
- Severek Ölenler (Kartalların Öcü) - 1965
- Elveda Sevgilim - 1965
- Ekmekçi Kadın - 1965
- Tığ Gibi Delikanlı - 1964
- Fıstık Gibi Maşallah - 1964
- Macera Kadını - 1964
- Öpüşmek Yasak - 1964
- Anasının Kuzusu - 1964
- Anadolu Çocuğu - 1964
- Asfalt Rıza - 1964
- Aslan Marka Nihat (Aşk Otobüsü) - 1964
- Bomba Gibi Kız - 1964
- Ölümün Ücreti - 1964
- Kimse Fatma Gibi Öpemez - 1964
- Varan Bir - 1964
- Kavga Var - 1964
- Yiğitler Yatağı - 1964
- Tophaneli Osman - 1964
- Acemi Çapkın - 1964
- Ağaçlar Ayakta Ölür - 1964
- Afilli Delikanlılar - 1964
- Çalınan Aşk - 1963
- Hop Dedik - 1963
- Beni Osman Öldürdü - 1963
- Tatlı Sert - 1963
- Barut Fıçısı - 1963
- Çifte Nikah - 1962
- Fatoş'un Bebekleri - 1962
- Kırık Plak - 1959
