= The Bread Peddler (1963 film) =

1963 film directed by Maurice Cloche

- Directed by: Maurice Cloche
- Written by: Maurice Cloche; Christian Plume; Xavier de Montépin (novel)
- Starring: Suzanne Flon; Philippe Noiret; Jean Rochefort
- Cinematography: Henri Decaë
- Music by: René Sylviano
- Release date: 30 August 1963
- Running time: 122 minutes
- Countries: France; Italy
- Language: French

The Bread Peddler (French: La porteuse de pain, Italian: La portatrice di pane) is a 1963 French-Italian historical drama film directed by Maurice Cloche and starring Suzanne Flon, Philippe Noiret and Jean Rochefort. It is based on the novel of the same title by Xavier de Montépin.

== Cast ==
- Suzanne Flon as Maman Lison / Jeanne Fortier
- Philippe Noiret as Jacques Garaud / Paul Harmant
- Jean Rochefort as Ovide Soliveau
- Jeanne Valérie as Mary Harmant
- Michel Lemoine as Georges Darier
- José Greci as Amanda
- Marie-France Mignal as Lucie
- Michel Bardinet as Jules Labroue
- Bernard La Jarrige as Le préfet de police
- Pierre Doris as Le vendeur de journaux
- Paul Vervisch as Ricoux
- Albert Dinan as Le Tourangeau, un boulanger
- Pierre Mirat as La Brioche
- Aram Stephan as Le prince
- Claude Le Lorrain as Perkins
- Lisette Lebon as Marianne
- Philippe Castelli as Le premier policier aux ordres du préfet de police
- Bernard Musson as Le second policier aux ordres du préfet de police
- Pierre Duncan as L'officier de police
- Grégoire Gromoff as L'annonceur
- Max Montavon as Un gendarme
- Madeleine Suffel as La concierge
- Pierre Massimi as Lucien Labroue
- Alberto Lupo as Étienne Castel

== See also ==
- The Bread Peddler (1950, also directed by Maurice Cloche)

== Bibliography ==
- Goble, Alan. The Complete Index to Literary Sources in Film. Walter de Gruyter, 1999.
