= Thérèse Raquin (1928 film) =

1928 film by Jacques Feyder

- Directed by: Jacques Feyder
- Based on: Thérèse Raquin by Émile Zola
- Production company: Deutsche Film Union
- Release date: 1928
- Countries: France; Germany
- Language: Silent

Thérèse Raquin is a 1928 drama film directed by Jacques Feyder. It is the third silent film adaptation of the 1867 novel of the same name by Émile Zola. The film stars Gina Manès as Thérèse Raquin, Wolfgang Zilzer as Monsieur Raquin, and Jeanne Marie-Laurent as Madame Raquin. The décors of the Paris suburbs for the film were built by André Andrejew. The film was produced by Deutsche Film Union in Germany, with German and French actors, in a French-German co-production, to be later released at the same time in France as Thérèse Raquin and Germany as Du sollst nicht ehebrechen!

As no words were spoken, both versions differed only in the language of intertitles. The British title at the time of the film's original release was Thou Shalt Not. This is the last of the silent film imports distributed by Warner Bros.' newly acquired First National subsidiary, containing no dialogue with music score and sound effects.

Thérèse Raquin is now considered a lost film, and only some production stills have survived.

== Cast ==
- Gina Manès as Thérèse Raquin
- Hans Adalbert Schlettow as Laurent LeClaire
- Jeanne Marie-Laurent as Madame Raquin
- Wolfgang Zilzer as Camille Raquin
- La Jana as Susanne Michaud
- Paul Henckels as Grivet
- Charles Barrois as Michaud
- Peter C. Leska as Rolin

== See also ==
- List of lost films
