= Les Mystères de Marseille =

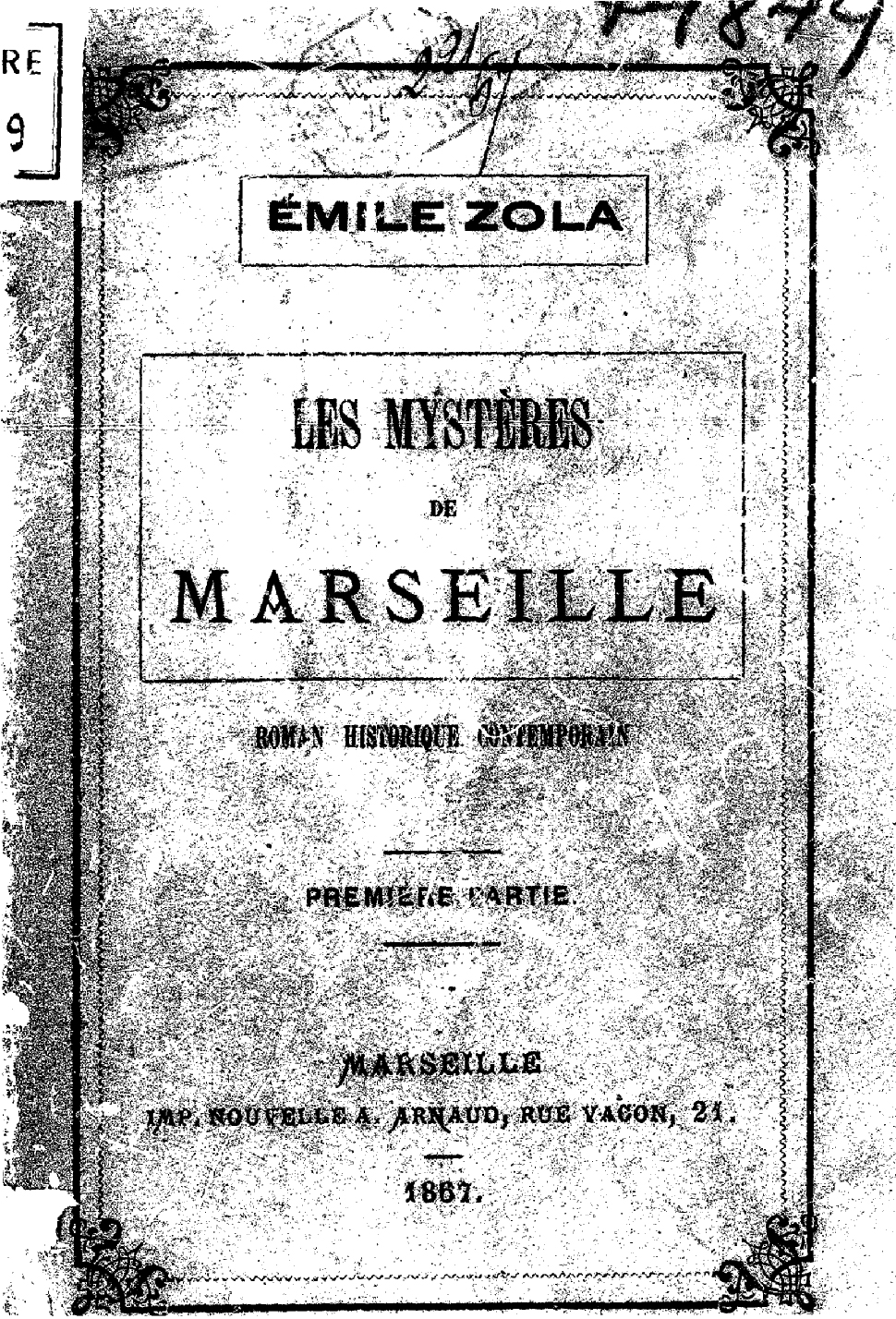
- Author: Émile Zola
- Original title: Les Mystères de Marseille
- Translator: Edward Vizetelly
- Language: French
- Genre: Naturalism, Psychological novel
- Publisher: Hutchinson (UK)
- Publication date: 1895
- Publication place: France
- Media type: Print (Hardback & Paperback)

The novel Les Mystères de Marseille by Émile Zola appeared as a serialized story in Le Messager de Provence in 1867, while Zola was writing Thérèse Raquin. As a work of his youth, it was thus also a commissioned work on which Zola cut his teeth. In it, he himself saw the amount of will and work that he had to expend to elevate himself to the literary effort of the Rougon – Macquart novels.

Indeed, in this popular novel, typical of the genre in its various and unexpected twists and turns, we can already see his style, his palate for real life, his indignation about injustice, and his art of depicting social strata (the wealthy, the clergy, the deviants, the common man) as well as events (the revolution of 1848, the cholera epidemic). With this canvas as a background, [he has painted] a breathtaking adventure, the thrilling story of an impossible love, that resembles the love of liberty.

It has been translated as The Mysteries of Marseilles (1895, London: Hutchinson) and as The Mysteries of Marseille (2008, New York: Mondial), both translations by Edward Vizetelly.

== Plot introduction ==
Les Mystères de Marseille recounts the love of Philippe Cayol, poor, untitled, republican, and of young Blanche de Cazalis, the niece of De Cazalis, a millionaire, politician and all-powerful in Marseilles. Philippe's brother, Marius devotes himself to protecting the two lovers – and the child Blanche gave birth to before entering a convent – from the anger of De Cazalis.
