= Thérèse Raquin =

1867 novel by Émile Zola

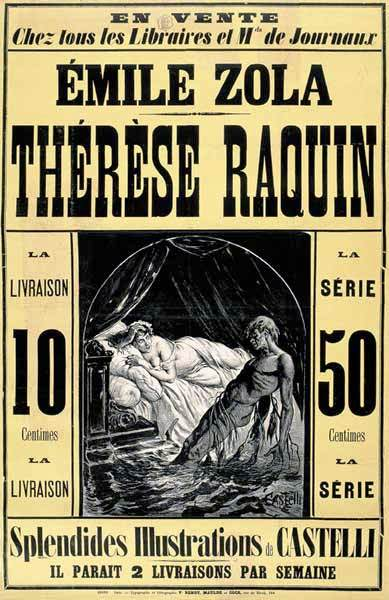
- Advertisement
- Author: Émile Zola
- Original title: Thérèse Raquin
- Language: French
- Genre: Naturalism, theatrical naturalism, psychological novel
- Set in: Paris, 1860s
- Published: L'Artiste magazine
- Publication date: 1867
- Publication place: France
- English publication date: 1881
- Media type: Print (Serial, Hardcover, Paperback)
- Pages: 305
- Dewey Decimal: 843.89
- LC Class: PQ2521.T3 E5
- Preceded by: Les Mystères de Marseille
- Followed by: Madeleine Férat
- Original text: Thérèse Raquin at French Wikisource

Thérèse Raquin (French pronunciation: [teʁɛz ʁakɛ̃]) is an early novel by French writer Émile Zola. The germ of the novel was present in his short story "Un Mariage d'Amour", published in December 1866. He then expanded the story into a novel, which appeared in serial form from August–October 1867 in the magazine L'Artiste. Later that year it was published in book form. Although it was Zola's third novel, Thérèse Raquin was the one that earned him fame and notoriety. The plot, with its focus on adultery and murder, was considered scandalous and described as "putrid literature" in a review in Le Figaro.

The novel tells the tale of a young woman, Thérèse Raquin, who is coerced by an overbearing aunt into a loveless marriage with her first cousin Camille. He is sickly and egocentric and when the opportunity arises, Thérèse enters into a turbulent, sordid affair with Camille's friend, Laurent. Despite their numerous trysts, Thérèse and Laurent are convinced they can only be truly happy if they are married. To do that, they must kill Camille, and so they carry out the murderous deed. The plan works – they wed two years after his death – but they are so haunted by guilt that they begin to hate each other.

In Zola's preface to the second edition, published in 1868, he explained that his goal was "to study, not characters, but temperaments". Because of its detached, scientific approach, the novel is considered a seminal work in the movement known as literary naturalism. Zola adapted Thérèse Raquin for the stage in 1873. It has since been adapted for other media including opera, musical theater, film, radio and television.

== Plot summary ==
Thérèse Raquin is the daughter of a French sea captain and Algerian mother. After her mother's early death, Thérèse is placed in the countryside with her aunt, Madame Raquin, and her aunt's valetudinarian son Camille. Because he is "ill", Madame Raquin dotes on him to the point of spoiling him, and he grows up self-centered. Thérèse and Camille are raised side-by-side. When Thérèse turns 21, Madame Raquin persuades the cousins to marry each other, though neither feels any love regarding the match. Shortly thereafter, Camille insists that the family must move to Paris so that he can find a profession.

To support him in Paris while he seeks employment, Madame Raquin and Thérèse set up a haberdashery shop in the Passage du Pont Neuf. Camille obtains an office job where he encounters Laurent, a childhood friend and amateur painter. Laurent visits the Raquins and, while painting a portrait of Camille, decides to seduce the lonely Thérèse, mostly because he cannot afford prostitutes anymore. It soon becomes a torrid affair. They have frequent late-afternoon rendezvous in Thérèse's room. But when Laurent's boss no longer allows him to leave work early, the lovers must think of some other means to be together. Since they are infatuated with the dream of living openly as a married couple, Thérèse suggests killing Camille: he is the obstacle to achieving their dream.

Laurent lures Camille, who cannot swim, into taking a boating trip along with Thérèse. At a secluded spot on the river, Laurent chokes Camille and attempts to throw him off the boat. While defending himself, Camille bites Laurent on the neck. Eventually, Laurent overpowers Camille and drowns him. Laurent goes to the authorities and says his friend is missing and may have fallen overboard. Laurent and Thérèse deliver the devastating news to Madame Raquin that her son has disappeared. Everyone believes it was a boating accident and that the two of them tried valiantly to save Camille. The body is not discovered for days. Laurent is uncertain about whether Camille is actually dead. Laurent often visits the mortuary, even though it disturbs him, until he finds Camille's corpse there. Thérèse becomes nervous and has nightmares; the previously calm and centered Laurent also grows agitated. Their feelings toward each other change. They do not renew their affair, but still devise a plan to marry, without raising suspicion, and thereby reap the rewards of their crime.

The widowed Thérèse acts depressed around family and acquaintances, and Laurent publicly shows concern for her mental state. Michaud advises that Thérèse should remarry to revive her spirits, and that the ideal husband would be Laurent. The two finally marry but are haunted by the memory of the murder; Laurent's bite scar serves as a reminder. They have hallucinations of the dead Camille visiting their bedroom at night. They vacillate between trying to rekindle their passion to rid themselves of disturbing visions (and maybe "heal" the bite scar), and at the same time starting to despise one another. Laurent resumes painting, but every picture he draws resembles the dead man. Sickened by this, Laurent gives up art. He and Thérèse must also tend to Madame Raquin, who suffered a stroke after Camille's death. She has a second stroke and becomes paralyzed and mute.

During a heated argument, Thérèse and Laurent reveal in Madame Raquin's presence that they murdered Camille. She had believed they loved her son and mourned his passing, but now she is filled with rage, disgust, and horror. While friends are visiting for an evening game of dominoes, she manages with extreme effort to move her finger in a writing motion on the table. She traces out the words "Thérèse et Laurent ont ...". The complete sentence was meant to be "Thérèse et Laurent ont tué Camille" (Thérèse and Laurent killed Camille), but her strength gives out before she can finish. The clueless Michaud interprets her intended message as, "Thérèse and Laurent ont bien soin de moi." (Thérèse and Laurent look after me very well.)

The married couple find life together intolerable. Laurent's extreme cruelty comes out; he savagely kills the family cat François. He starts beating Thérèse, something she provokes to distract her from her morbid thoughts. She spends hours praying at Madame Raquin's feet and covering the disabled woman with kisses, hoping for forgiveness. Thérèse and Laurent argue incessantly about who was more responsible for Camille's death. To escape this endless nightmare, they contemplate killing one another. At the novel's climax, they're about to do so when each realizes the other's plan. They break down sobbing in tacit agreement of what they must do next. After a last embrace, they carry out a mutual suicide pact by ingesting poison, all in front of the hate-filled, watchful gaze of Madame Raquin.

== Characters ==
- Thérèse Raquin – the eponymous protagonist, is married to Camille and the daughter of Madame Raquin's brother
- Camille Raquin – Thérèse's first cousin and eventual husband
- Madame Raquin – Camille's mother and Thérèse's aunt. She owns a small haberdashery shop to support her family.
- Laurent – Camille's childhood friend and co-worker, who seduces Thérèse
- Grivet – an elderly employee of the Orléans Railway Company, where Camille and Laurent work
- Michaud – a police commissioner and friend of Madame Raquin
- Olivier – Michaud's son who works at the police prefecture
- Suzanne – Olivier's wife
- François – the Raquin's cat

== Themes ==
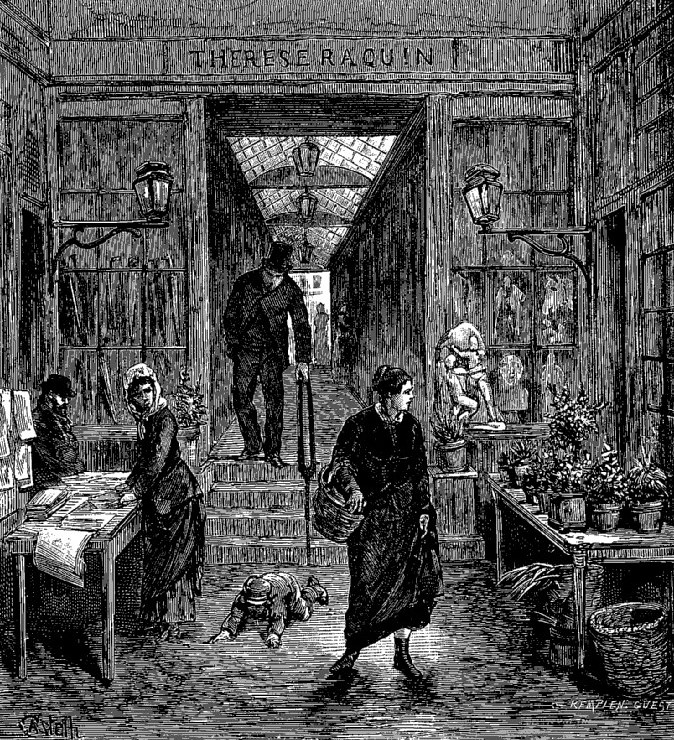
The Passage du Pont-Neuf. (illustration by Horace Castelli, 1883)

=== Punishment and imprisonment ===
Throughout the book, there are references to chains, cages, tombs, and pits. These contribute to the impression that Laurent and Thérèse are in a state of remorse and plagued by guilt. The book mentions how they claw at the chains binding them together. The haberdashery shop where Thérèse works is compared to a tomb, from which she watches corpses walk by in the day.

=== Temperaments ===
In his 1868 preface, Zola wrote that he set out to study temperaments. To his main characters, he assigns various humors according to Galen's four temperaments: Thérèse is melancholic, Laurent is sanguine, Camille is phlegmatic, and Madame Raquin is choleric. For Zola, the interactions of these personality types could only have the result that plays out in his plot.

=== The inner animal ===
Also in his preface, Zola calls both Thérèse and Laurent "human animals" and the novel's characters are often given animal tendencies. He writes:

I chose to portray individuals existing under the sovereign dominion of their nerves and their blood, devoid of free will and drawn into every act of their lives by the inescapable promptings of their flesh. Thérèse and Laurent are human animals, nothing more. In these animals, I set out to trace, step by step, the hidden workings of the passions, the urges of instinct, and the derangements of the brain which follow on from a nervous crisis. Love, for my two heroes, is the satisfaction of a physical need; the murder they commit is a consequence of their adultery, a consequence they accept as wolves accept the slaughter of sheep.... In a word, I had only one aim, which was: given a powerful man and an unsatisfied woman, to seek within them the animal, and even to see in them only the animal, to plunge them together into a violent drama and then take scrupulous note of their sensations and their actions. I simply carried out on two living bodies the same analytical examination that surgeons perform on corpses.

Zola would again take up this notion of the inner animal, the "human beast", in his 1890 novel La Bête humaine.

== Literary significance and reception ==
Thérèse Raquin is generally considered to be Zola's first major work. Upon its release in 1867, it was a commercial and artistic success, and quickly led to a second edition reprint in 1868. The novel gained notoriety when critic Louis Ulbach (pen name: Ferragus) labeled it "putrid literature" in a long diatribe for Le Figaro. Zola capitalized on this negative publicity, and even referred to the "putrid literature" comment in his preface to the second edition.

Zola's story about a woman in an unhappy marriage, who takes on a lover and then persuades him to help her kill her husband, has inspired many subsequent fictional works such as James M. Cain's 1934 novel, The Postman Always Rings Twice, which has a similar plot.

== Adaptations ==
=== Theatrical ===
Zola adapted the novel into a play, Thérèse Raquin, first staged in 1873. It was not performed in London until 1891, under the auspices of the Independent Theatre Society, since the Lord Chamberlain's Office refused to license it.

Stage productions of Zola's play include:

- 2006 for the Royal National Theatre, London, adaptation written by Nicholas Wright
- 2007 production of the Nicholas Wright adaptation by Quantum Theatre in Pittsburgh; staged in the empty swimming pool of the Carnegie Free Library of Braddock
- 2008 production at Riverside Studios, London, adaptation by Pauline McLynn
- 2009 production at Edinburgh Fringe Festival performed by pupils of the Cheltenham Ladies' College (adapted by Fiona Ross)
- 2014 production touring from Bath, adapted by Helen Edmundson
- 2014 production at Theatre Works, Melbourne, Australia; adapted and directed by Gary Abrahams
- 2015 Edmundson adaptation at the Roundabout Theater at Studio 54 (New York City)
- 2017 revival of the 2014 Gary Abrahams adaption touring Australia nationally

An opera based on the novel was written by composer Michael Finnissy and first performed in 1993. Another operatic adaptation, Thérèse Raquin, by Tobias Picker, opened in 2001.

The novel was made into the Broadway musical Thou Shalt Not, with music by Harry Connick Jr.

The play The Artificial Jungle by Charles Ludlam was an adaption of the novel, written in the hard-boiled crime style of James M. Cain.

Neal Bell adapted the novel into a play under the same title. It was first produced at New York University by Playwrights Horizons Theatre School on December 3, 1991, directed by Edward Elefterion, with Katie Bainbridge in the title role. Its first professional production was at the Williamstown Theatre Festival on June 30, 1993, directed by Michael Greif, with Lynn Hawley as Thérèse. On July 10, 1994, Greif, in conjunction with La Jolla Playhouse in San Diego, put on the West Coast premiere of the play, with Paul Giamatti in the role of Camille. The New York premiere was on October 27, 1997, at the Classic Stage Company, directed by David Esbjornson, with Elizabeth Marvel as Thérèse. The Los Angeles premiere was directed by Charlie Stratton, with Leslie Hope as Thérèse.

A 2014 UK musical, Thérèse Raquin, with music by Craig Adams and book and lyrics by Nona Shepphard, featured Julie Atherton as Thérèse, Tara Hugo as Madame Raquin, Jeremy Legat as Camille, and Ben Lewis/Greg Barnett as Laurent. After a sold-out run at Finborough Theatre, the Theatre Bench production moved to Park Theatre in Finsbury Park and was nominated for a West End Frame Award. A cast recording was released in 2015.

=== Film and television ===
Film and television adaptations of the novel include:

- Thérèse Raquin (1915), Italian silent film, directed by Nino Martoglio
- Thérèse Raquin (1928), German film
- Thérèse Raquin (1950), BBC adaptation starring Sonia Dresdel as Thérèse
- Thérèse Raquin (1953), with Simone Signoret
- Thérèse Raquin (1956), German TV movie
- Thérèse Raquin (1965), Swedish TV movie
- Thérèse Raquin (1966), German TV movie
- Teresa Raquin (1977), Mexican TV series
- Thérèse Raquin (1979), Belgian TV movie
- Thérèse Raquin (1980), BBC series starring Kate Nelligan as Thérèse, Brian Cox as Laurent LeClaire and Alan Rickman as Vidal (Laurent's artist friend, who is unnamed in the novel)
- Thérèse Raquin (1985), Italian miniseries
- Thirst (2009), Korean horror film which borrowed several plot elements from Thérèse Raquin
- In Secret (2013), American film starring Elizabeth Olsen as Thérèse, Jessica Lange as Madame Raquin, Oscar Isaac as Laurent and Tom Felton as Camille; directed by Charlie Stratton
- Locked In (2023), a psychological thriller that is a modern interpretation of Thérèse Raquin

=== Radio ===
- Thérèse Raquin (1998), BBC Radio 4 radio adaptation starring Anna Massey as Thérèse
- Thérèse Raquin (2009), BBC Radio 4 "Classic Serial" adaptation in two parts starring Charlotte Riley as Thérèse and Andrew Buchan as Laurent

== Publication history ==
- 1867 – France, Albert Lacroix (December 1867)

=== English translations ===
==== Expurgated ====
1. 1881 – Mary Neal Sherwood (Philadelphia: T. B. Peterson & Brothers)
2. 1886 – Ernest Alfred Vizetelly (London: Vizetelly & Co.)
3. 1892 – R. K. Fox (under the title, The Devil's Compact)

==== Unexpurgated ====
1. 1902 - Edward Vizetelly (Grant Richards)
2. 1952 – unknown for Corgi Books as Theresa
3. 1954 – Lee Marcourt (Ace Books)
4. 1955 – Philip G. Downs (William Heinemann Ltd)
5. 1960 – Willard R. Trask (Bantam Books)
6. 1962 – Leonard W. Tancock (Penguin Classics)
7. 1992 – Andrew Rothwell (Oxford World's Classics)
8. 1995 – Robin Buss (Penguin Classics)
9. 2013 – Adam Thorpe (Vintage, Random House)

== See also ==
- Four temperaments
- Naturalism
