= The Adventures of Pinocchio (unfinished film) =

1936 film

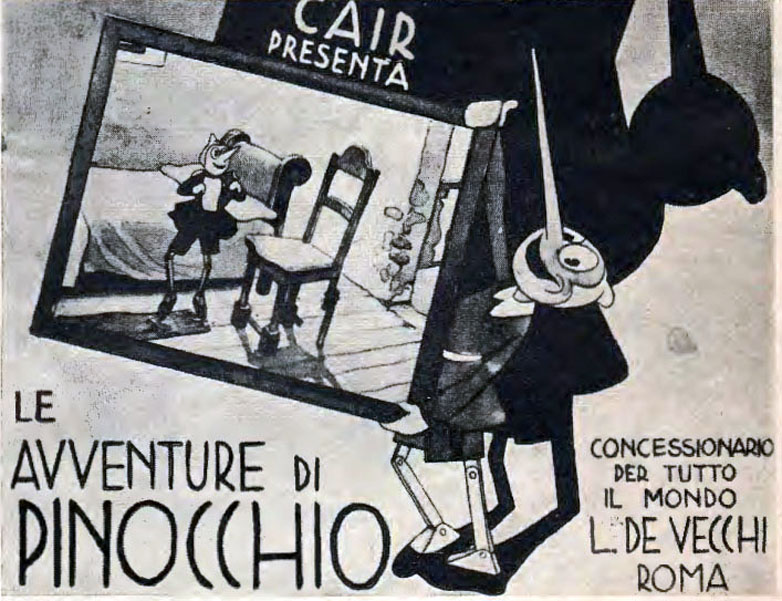
- Italian advertisement for the film.
- Directed by: Raoul Verdini; Umberto Spano
- Based on: The Adventures of Pinocchio by Carlo Collodi
- Produced by: CAIR (Cartoni Animati Italiani Roma)
- Production company: CAIR (Cartoni Animati Italiani Roma)
- Distributed by: De Vecchi
- Running time: 105 minutes
- Country: Italy
- Language: Italian
- Budget: ₤1,000,000

The Adventures of Pinocchio (Italian: Le avventure di Pinocchio) was an Italian animated film directed by Raoul Verdini and Umberto Spano. Created and produced by Cartoni Animati Italiani Roma (CAIR) and distributed by De Vecchi, this cartoon was based on the famous 1883 children's book The Adventures of Pinocchio by Carlo Collodi.

It was intended to be the first animated feature film from Italy, but was never completed; The Dynamite Brothers eventually became said film in 1949. It also would have been the first cel animated feature film ever, beating Snow White and the Seven Dwarfs, and the first animated film adaptation based on Collodi's novel. It is now considered lost, with only the original script and some still frames being all that survived of the film.

== Production ==
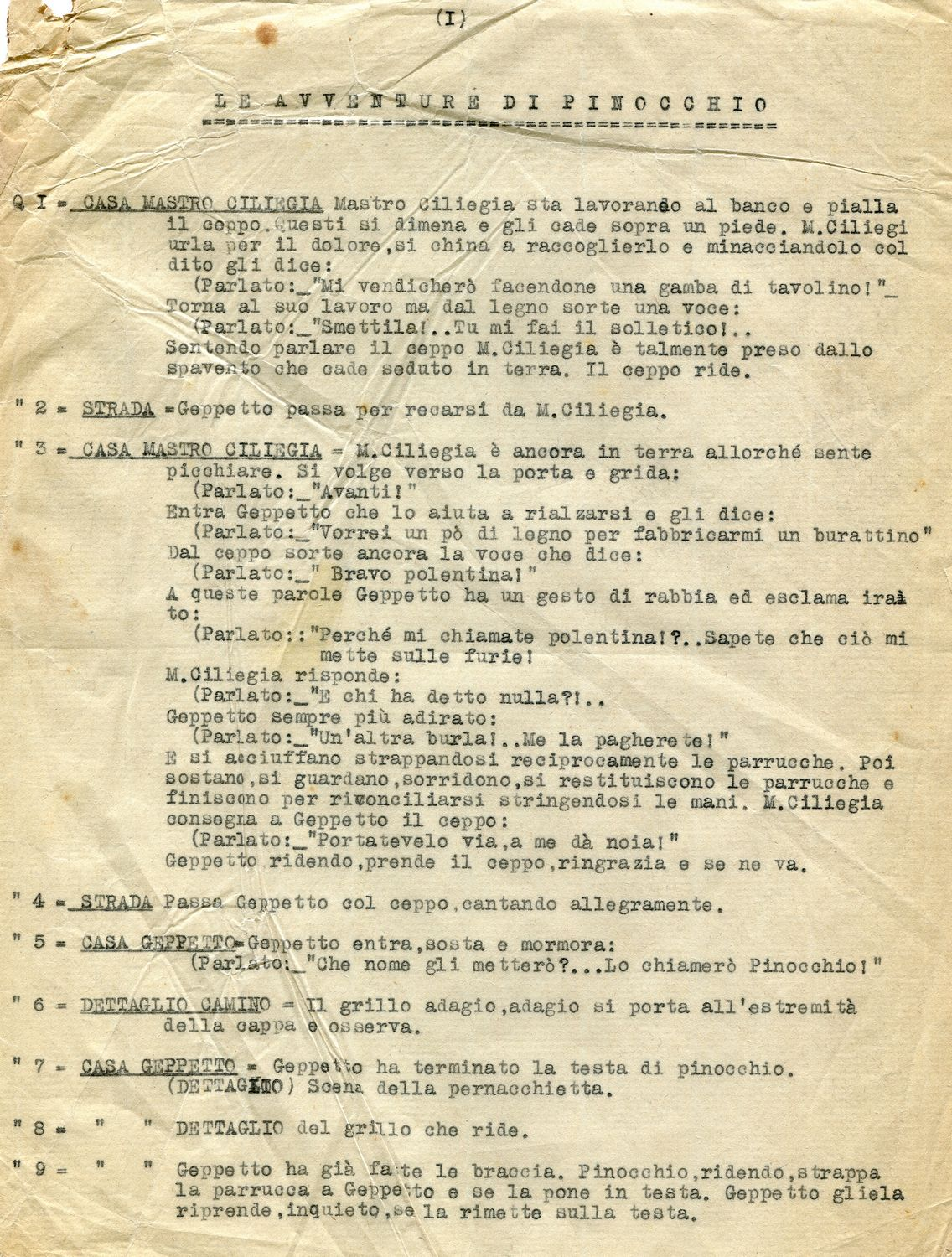
The first page of the original script

In January 1935, the politician Alfredo Rocco decided to commission the first Italian animated film at the newly formed CAIR. The studio chose to faithfully adapt the Collodi novel The Adventures of Pinocchio, and began work after buying the rights from its publisher, R. Bemporad & Figlio. To date, it is not clear who directed the film; some sources cite Umberto Spano and Raul Verdini, while others cite Romolo Bacchini and his son Carlo, who were also the photographers.

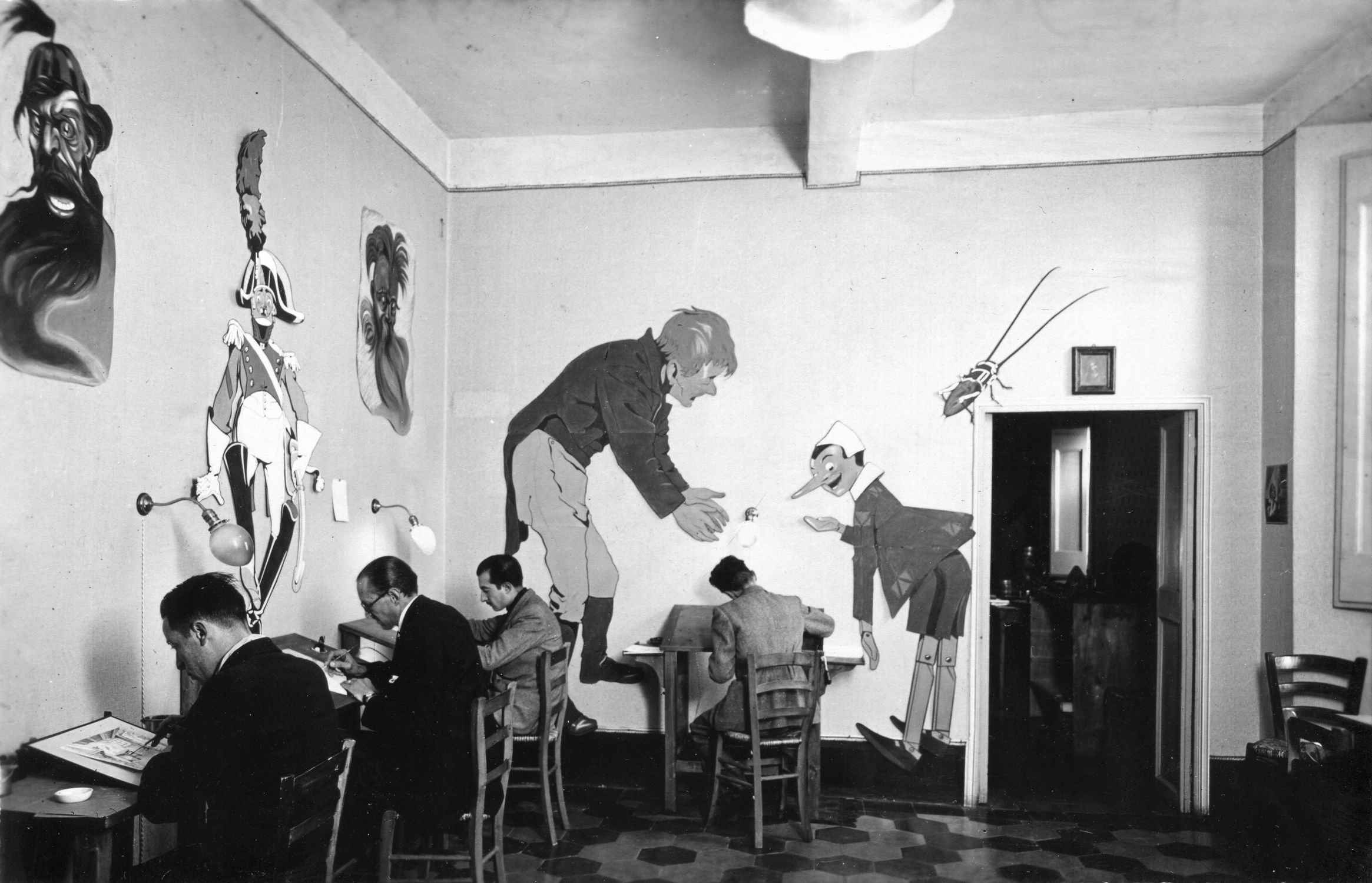
The animators of the film

The model sheet was made by Verdini and Barbara Mamelli, designers of the satirical newspaper Marc'Aurelio. Romolo Bacchini was also the producer and the artistic director with Verdini. The scenography was entrusted to Mario Pompei with Franco Fiorenzi and Gioacchino Colizzi. The composer has sometimes been credited as Umberto Giordano. Inking was done by Carlo Bacchini along with Ettore Ranalli, Ennio Zedda and Amerigo Tot.

The planned amount of drawings for a year of work was 110,000, with an estimated budget of ₤1 million, and the international distribution by De Vecchi was scheduled for fall of 1936.

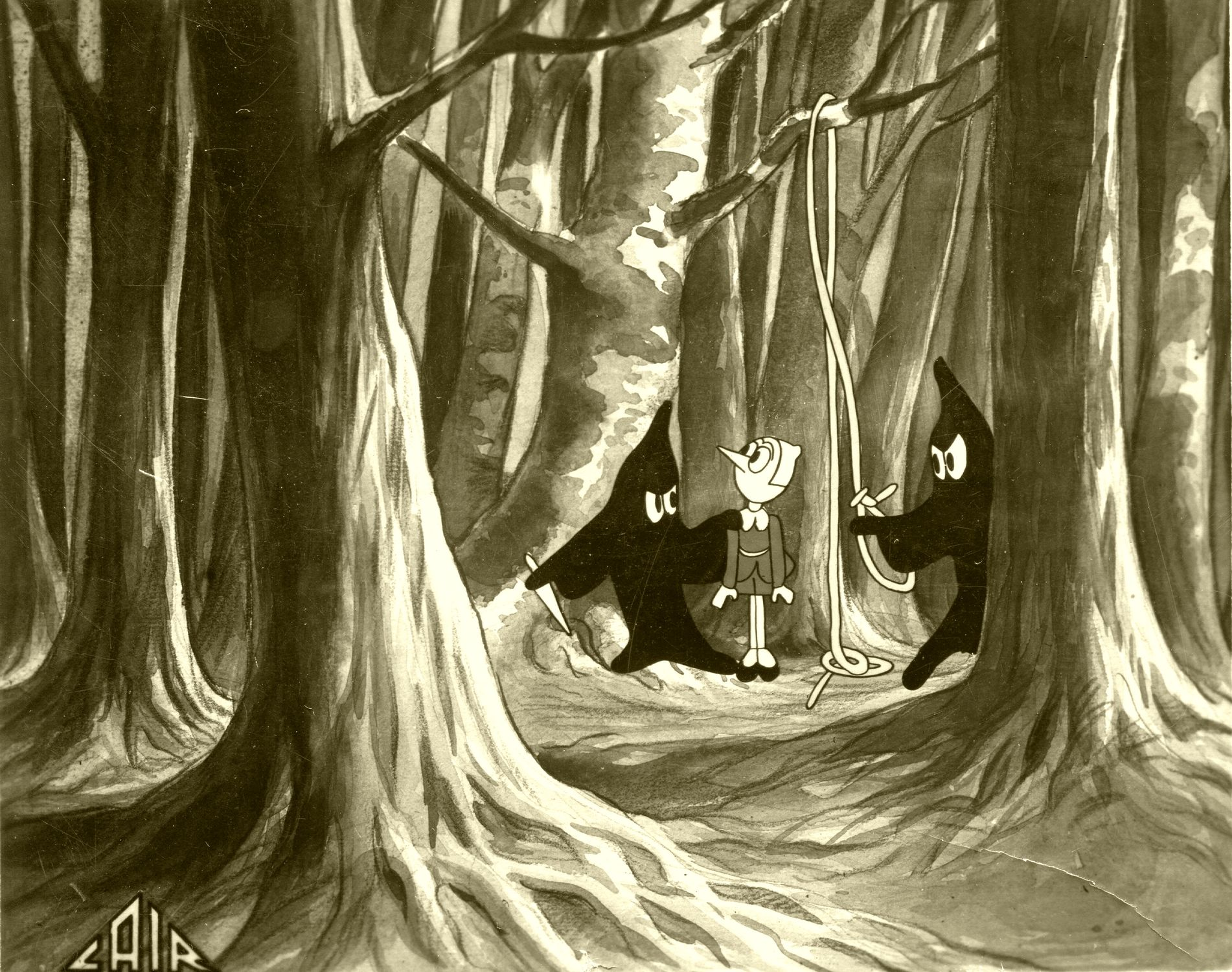
An original frame from the film, in which the Fox and the Cat in disguise hang Pinocchio

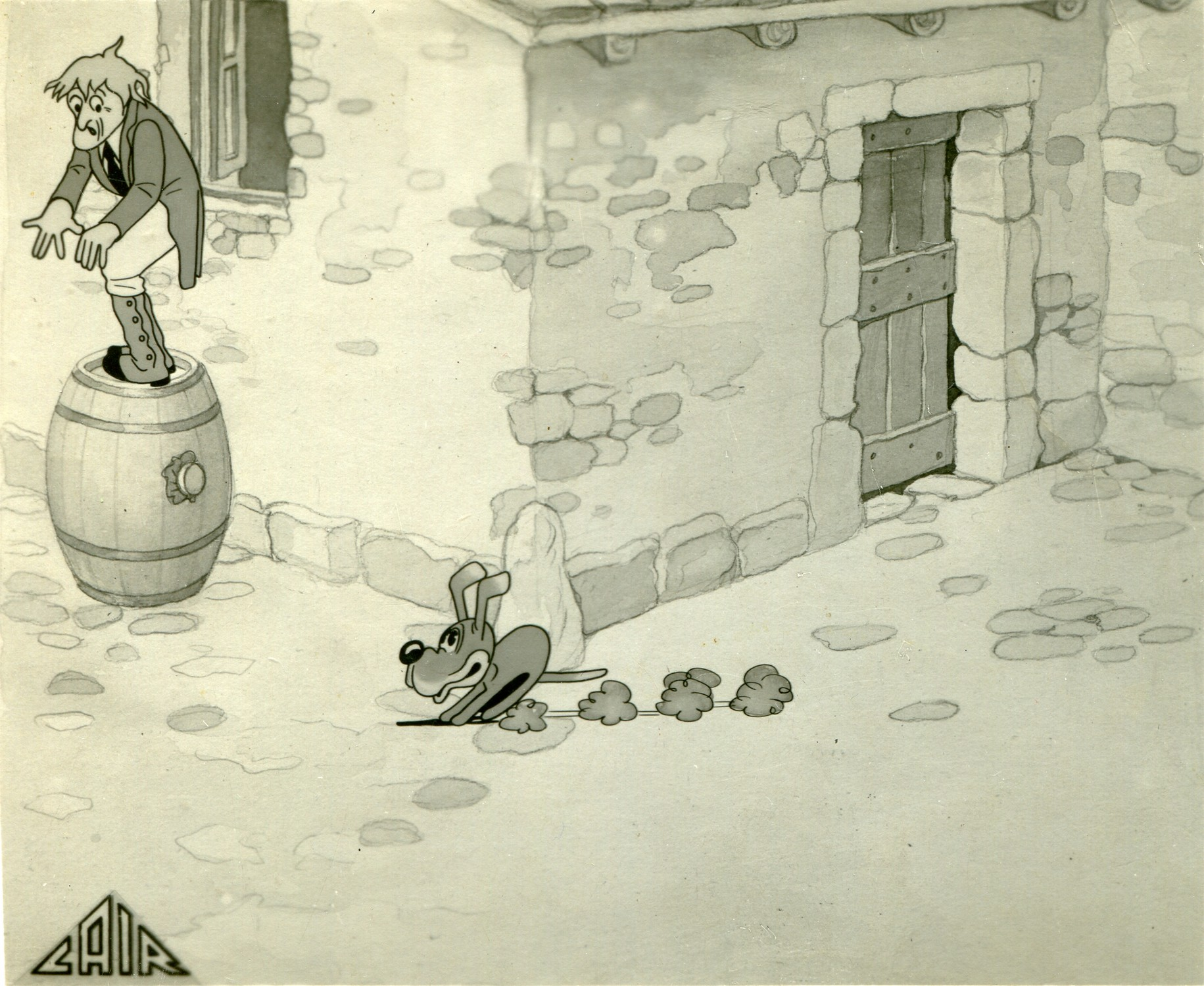
Geppetto in a frame of the film

However, various technical problems stalled production, as Barbara recalled in June 1992. By the end of 1936, CAIR had exhausted the film's financing, and ceased activities. All material was left unused, including about 150,000 drawings and 2,500 feet of film, estimated to last 105 minutes (1 hour and 45 minutes). Raoul Verdini attempted to finish the film while converting it to color with the Catalucci system, but was unsuccessful.

By this time, Walt Disney had acquired the rights to The Adventures of Pinocchio, and in 1940 his company Walt Disney Productions released their own adaptation as their second film, simply titled Pinocchio; some have suggested that Disney would buy the original negative of the unfinished movie.

== See also ==
- List of animated feature films
- List of lost films
