= Louis Ulbach =

French novelist, essayist and journalist (1822–1889)

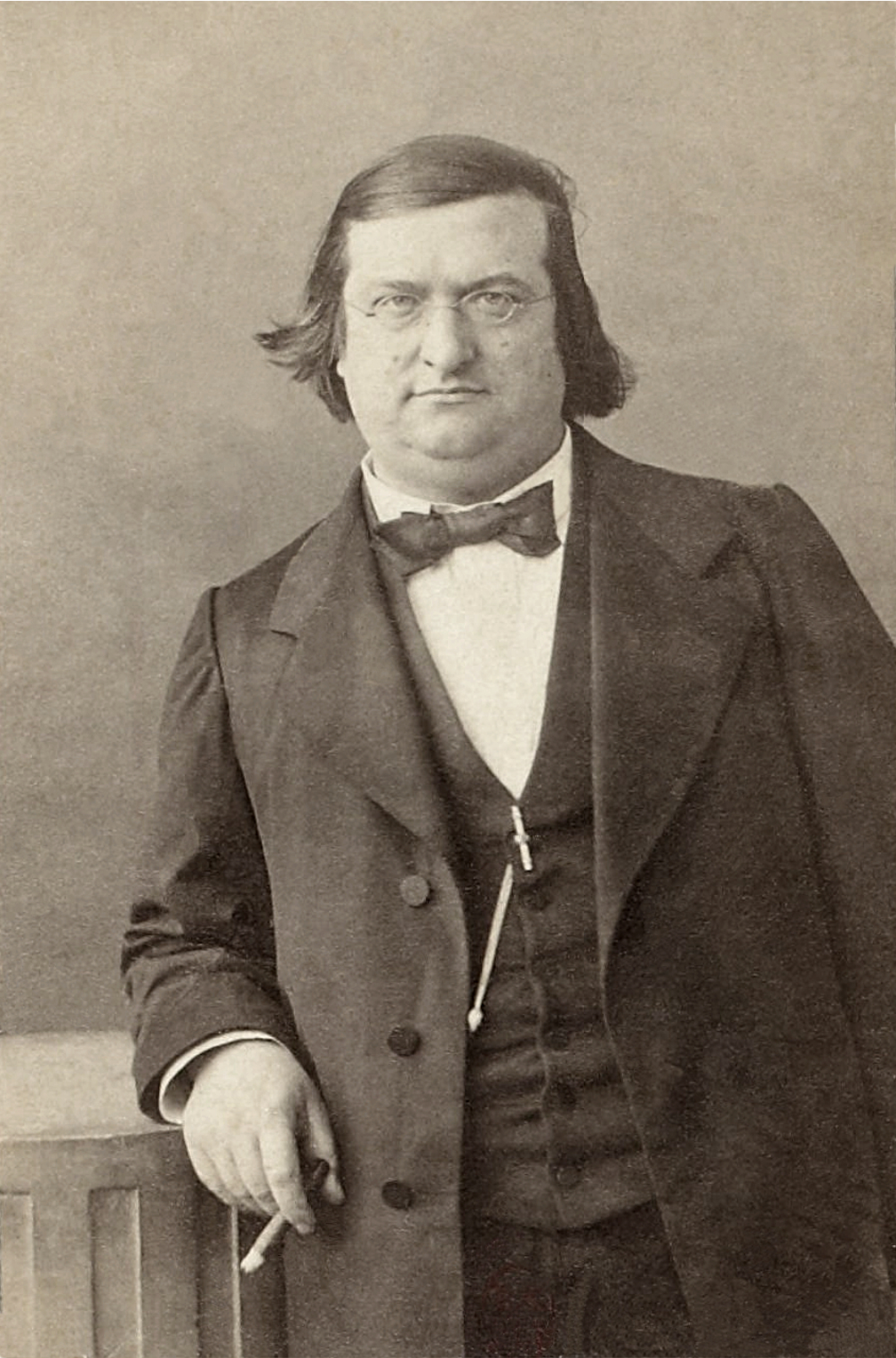
- Louis Ulbach, ca. 1865
- Born: 7 March 1822; Troyes, Aube, France
- Died: 16 April 1889 (aged 67); Paris, France
- Occupations: Author, editor, and publisher

Louis Ulbach (7 March 1822 – 16 April 1889) was a French novelist, essayist and journalist. He published seventy-six volumes, wrote three plays, and wrote numerous articles and political or biographical pamphlets. His romantic novels were compared to the works of Émile Zola and Alphonse Daudet.

He edited the Revue de Paris and published La Cloche, which was suppressed in 1869 for its hostility to the Second French Empire. He was imprisoned twice for his publication of La Cloche. He was a leader in the movement for perpetual copyright to authors.

In 1877, he was awarded the cross of the Legion of Honour.

== Personal life ==
Ulbach was born at Troyes in the department of Aube. He was described as a genial, intelligent, witty, and interesting man who was a notable conversationalist. He was a member of Jules Simon's salon with Edmond François Valentin About and other Frenchmen to discuss literary, political, and other current events. He was a popular leader within literary circles.

When Elisabeth of Wied, the Queen of Romania, was a girl, Ulbrach was said to have been her literary professor in Paris. Louis Ulbach was credited with "introducing the world to the pleasant pretty book of the Queen of Romania, the 'Pensees d'une Reine'." He was presented to the Queen at summer residence when he traveled to Sinaia in Romania. Upon seeing her works that were written in French, he encouraged her to publish a selection.

He died in Paris on 16 April 1889, after a long illness.

== Career and politics ==
He was encouraged to take up a literary career by Victor Hugo. When he was 22, Ulbach published a volume of poetry entitled Gloriana. After he graduated from college in 1845, he founded the La Revue des Famillies publication at Troyes. He moved to Paris in 1848 and saw the French Revolution of 1848. He took rank among the Republicans, and opposed the Empire as a Liberal.

He wrote a long series of novels and dramas of the French school of sensationalism. His romance novels were compared to the works of Émile Zola and Alphonse Daudet. Among his works are: Voyage autour de mon clocher (1864), Nos contemporains (1869–1871), Le Sacrifice of Aurélie (1873), Lettres d’une Honte Femme (written under the name Madeleine, 1873), La Ronde de Nuit (1874), Aventures de trois grandes dames de la cour de Vienne (3 vols., 1876); Le Baron Americain (1876), La Vie de Victor Hugo (1886), Le Compte Orphee (1878), and Les Buveurs de poisons: la fée verte (1879). He is also known for Mme. Gosselin, published in an English version, and his novels The Steel Hammer, and its sequel For Fifteen. The Confession of an Abbe was published in English by the month of his death. Described as a powerful story, it tells the story of a priest who "in a moment of passion forgets his vows." The Steel Hammer was another of his books that was translated into English.

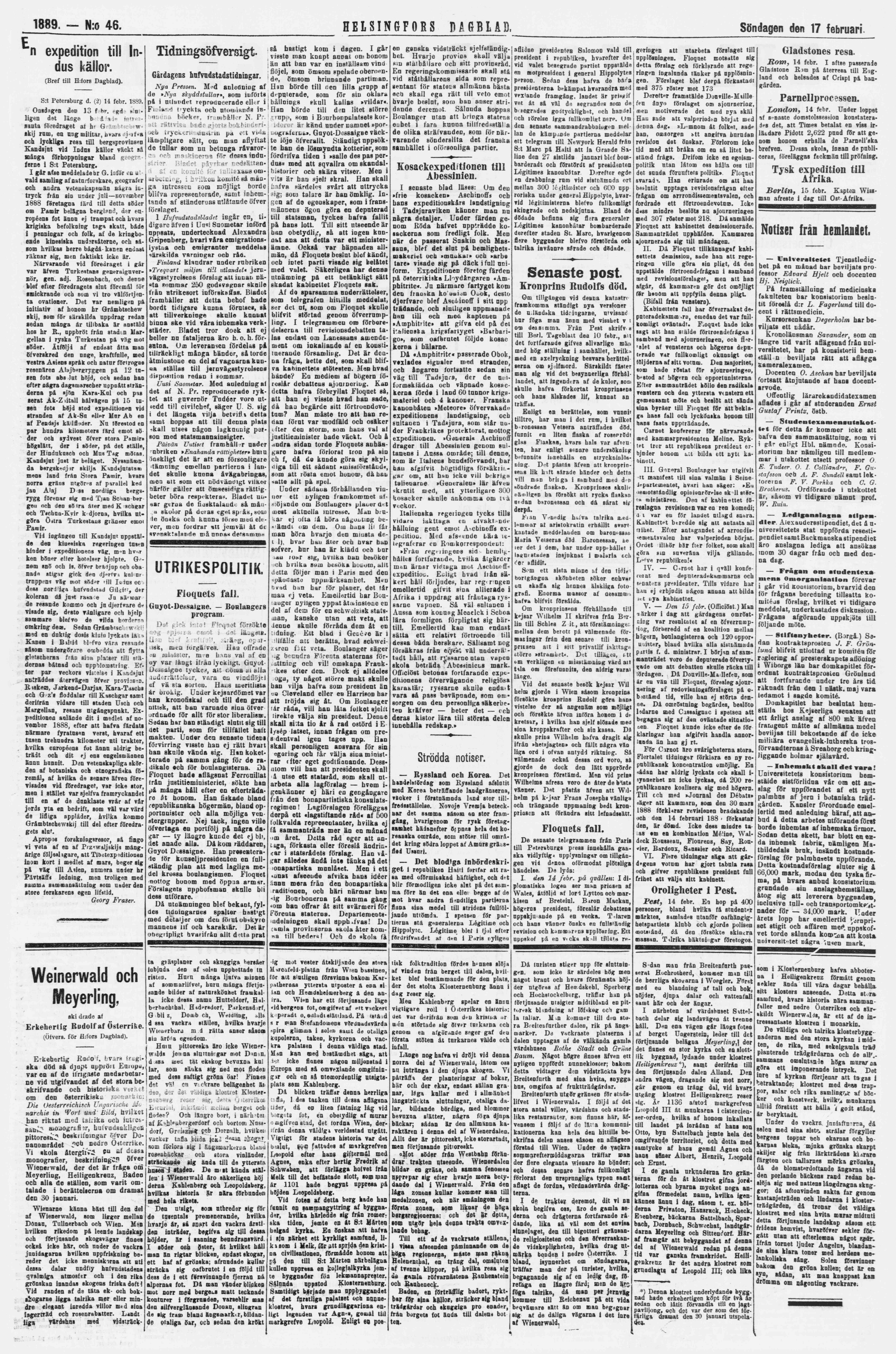
A page from the Finnish newspaper Helsingfors Dagblad (1889), showing a "ground floor" feuilleton

Ulbach was a Feuilletonist. The feuilleton was the literary consequence of the Coup of 18 Brumaire (Dix-huit-Brumaire). The feuilleton, which dealt ostensibly with literature, the drama and other harmless topics, but which, nevertheless, could make political capital out of the failure of a book or a play, under the Napoleonic nose, became a power.

He was connected with L'Indépendance Belge for many years. He edited the Revue de Paris from 1852 until its suppression in 1858. He became dramatic critic of the Temps, and attracted attention by a series of satirical letters addressed to Le Figaro over the signature of 'Ferragus', and published separately in 1868. As Ferragus, he called the novel Thérèse Raquin "putrid" in a long diatribe. It was said sarcastically of Ulbach that he was so painfully careful with his style that "he would split a hair in four."

In 1868 he founded a weekly journal, La Cloche, patterned after La Lanterne by Henri Rochefort. La Cloche was suppressed in 1869 for its hostility to the empire. Ulbach was imprisoned for six months at Sainte-Pélagie Prison after he had written that the Greek translation of Napoleon was "executioner". Upon on his release he revived the paper he got into trouble both with the commune and the government, and was again imprisoned in 1871–1872. When he was released, he devoted himself to literature and withdrew from politics. He was the editor of Raillement in 1876. In 1878 he was made librarian of the Bibliothèque de l'Arsenal.
