= The Bread Peddler (1916 film) =

- Directed by: Giovanni Enrico Vidali
- Written by: Xavier de Montépin (novel)
- Cinematography: Anchise Brizzi
- Production company: Vidali Film
- Distributed by: Vidali Film
- Release date: March 1916
- Country: Italy
- Languages: Silent; Italian intertitles

The Bread Peddler (Italian:La portatrice di pane) is a 1916 Italian silent drama film directed by Giovanni Enrico Vidali. It is based on the novel of the same name by Xavier de Montépin.

== Cast ==
- Maria Gandini
- Emilio Rodani
- Giovanni Enrico Vidali

== Bibliography ==
- Goble, Alan. The Complete Index to Literary Sources in Film. Walter de Gruyter, 1999.
