= The Bread Seller Woman =

- Film poster
- Directed by: Zafer Davutoğlu
- Written by: Osman F. Seden; Xavier de Montépin (novel)
- Produced by: Osman F. Seden
- Starring: Türkan Şoray; İzzet Günay; Çolpan İlhan
- Cinematography: Kenan Kurt
- Production company: Kemal Film
- Release date: 12 April 1965
- Country: Turkey
- Language: Turkish

The Bread Seller Woman (Turkish:Ekmekçi Kadın) is a 1965 Turkish drama film directed by Zafer Davutoğlu and starring Türkan Şoray, İzzet Günay and Çolpan İlhan. It is an adaptation of the French novel The Bread Peddler by Xavier de Montépin.

== Cast ==
- Türkan Şoray
- İzzet Günay
- Çolpan İlhan
- Kenan Pars
- Efgan Efekan
- Kadir Savun
- Hüseyin Baradan
- Faik Coşkun
- Hakkı Haktan
- Asim Nipton
- Senih Orkan
- Mürüvet Sim
- Nubar Terziyan

== Bibliography ==
- Laurence Raw. Exploring Turkish Cultures: Essays, Interviews and Reviews. Cambridge Scholars Publishing, 2011.
