= Jeanne Marie-Laurent =

French actress (1877–1964)

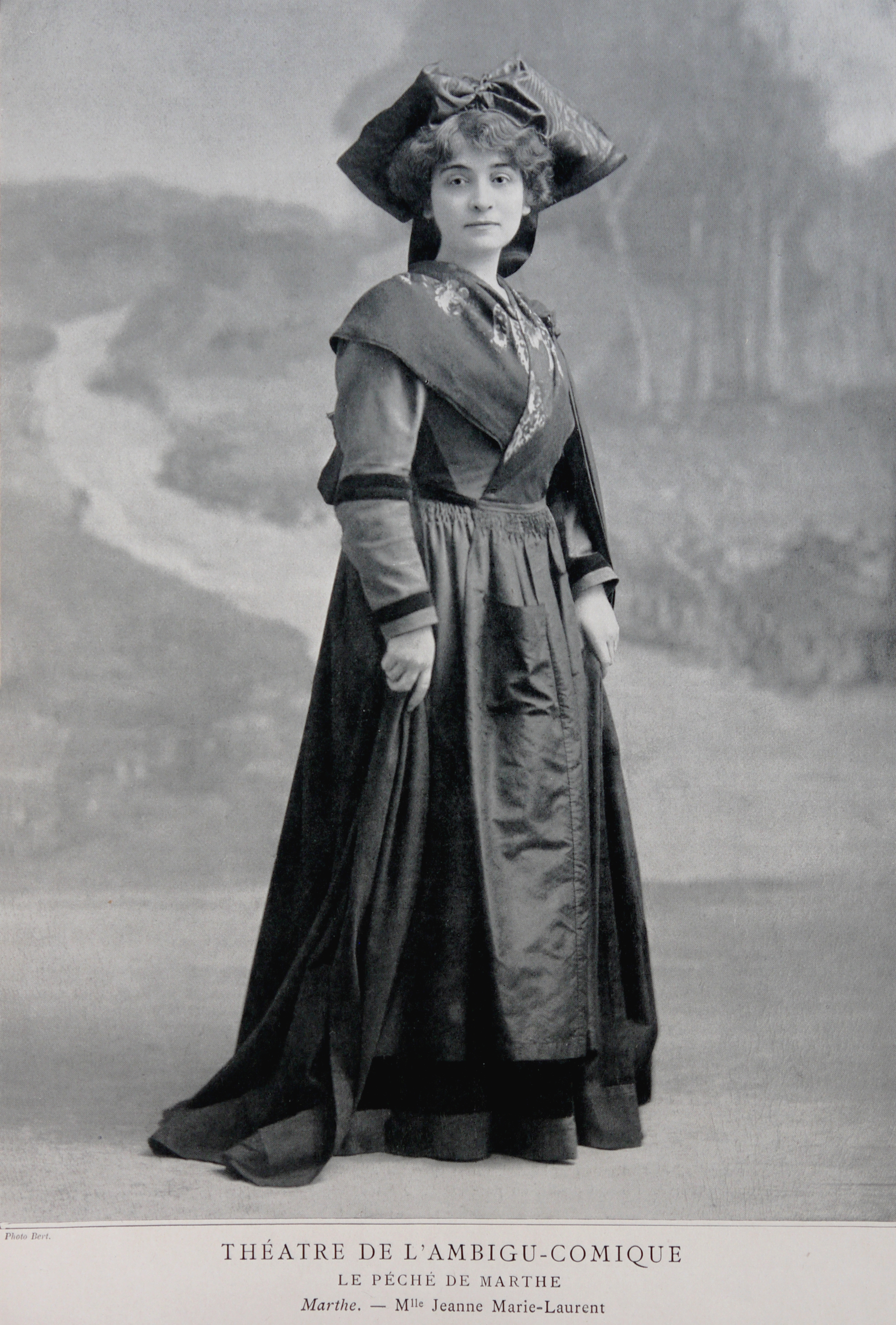
- Jeanne Marie-Laurent in 1910
- Born: 1 September 1877; Paris, France
- Died: 7 April 1964 (aged 86); Lagny-sur-Marne, Seine-et-Marne, France
- Other name: Jeanne Micheline Marie Quillevere
- Occupation: Actress
- Years active: 1908 - 1943 (film)

Jeanne Marie-Laurent (1 September 1877 – 7 April 1964) was a French film actress. She appeared in more than ninety films during her career, including the 1932 thriller Narcotics.

== Selected filmography ==
- Les Vampires (1916)
- Faces of Children (1925)
- Thérèse Raquin (1928)
- Verdun: Visions of History (1928)
- Narcotics (1932)
- The Crisis is Over (1934)
- The Bread Peddler (1934)
- The Call of Silence (1936)
- The Red Dancer (1937)
- Sisters in Arms (1937)
- Tamara (1938)
- Shot in the Night (1943)

== Bibliography ==
- Youngkin, Stephen. The Lost One: A Life of Peter Lorre. University Press of Kentucky, 2005.
