= The Bread Peddler (1934 film) =

- Directed by: René Sti
- Written by: Georges Berr; Jules Dornay; René Sti; Xavier de Montépin (novel)
- Produced by: Vladimir Zederbaum
- Starring: Germaine Dermoz; Jacques Grétillat; Simone Bourday
- Cinematography: Jacques Mercanton; Harry Stradling Sr.
- Edited by: Jacques Desagneaux
- Music by: Jacques Belasco
- Production company: Films Albatros
- Release date: 24 March 1934
- Running time: 100 minutes
- Country: France
- Language: French

The Bread Peddler (French: La porteuse de pain) is a 1934 French drama film directed by René Sti and starring Germaine Dermoz, Jacques Grétillat and Simone Bourday. It is based on Xavier de Montépin's novel of the same title.

The film's sets were designed by Eugène Lourié.

== Cast ==
- Germaine Dermoz as Jeanne Fortier
- Jacques Grétillat as Garaud
- Simone Bourday as Louise
- Fernandel as Billenbuis
- Mona Goya as Mary
- Madeleine Guitty as Rose
- Jeanne Marie-Laurent as Madame Darrier
- François Rozet as Lucien Labroue
- Samson Fainsilber as Castel
- Roger Dann as Georges Darrier
- Georges Paulais as L'avocat général
- Paul Clerget as L'abbé Laugier
- Alexandre Dréan as Cricri
- Daniel Mendaille as Soliveau
- Claude Borelli as Un petit garçon

== Bibliography ==
- Goble, Alan. The Complete Index to Literary Sources in Film. Walter de Gruyter, 1999.
