= The Bread Peddler (1923 film) =

1923 film

- Directed by: René Le Somptier
- Written by: Germaine Dulac; Xavier de Montépin (novel)
- Produced by: Marcel Vandal
- Starring: Suzanne Desprès; Gabriel Signoret; Geneviève Félix
- Cinematography: Amédée Morrin
- Production company: Les Films Marcel Vandal et Charles Delac
- Distributed by: Agence Générale Cinématographique
- Release date: 14 September 1923
- Country: France
- Languages: Silent; French intertitles

The Bread Peddler (French:La porteuse de pain) is a 1923 French silent drama film directed by René Le Somptier and starring Suzanne Desprès, Gabriel Signoret and Geneviève Félix. It is based on Xavier de Montépin's novel of the same title.

== Cast ==
- Suzanne Desprès as Jeanne Fortier
- Gabriel Signoret as Ovide Soliveau
- Geneviève Félix as Lucie Fortier
- Germaine Rouer as Mary Hartman
- Henri Baudin as Jacques Garraud
- Jacques Guilhène as Lucien Labroue
- René Koval as Cri-Cri
- Ernest Maupain as L'abbé Laugier
- Jacques Faure as Etienne Castel
- Pierre Almette as Georges Darrier
- Lucien Bataille
- Sylviane de Castillo as La bonne du curé
- Charles Dechamps
- Louis Kerly as Tête de Buis
- Peggy Vère

== Bibliography ==
- Goble, Alan. The Complete Index to Literary Sources in Film. Walter de Gruyter, 1999.
