= René Sti =

French film director

- Born: 23 April 1897; Iasi, Romania
- Died: 29 October 1951 (aged 54); Paris, France
- Other name: Adolf Ornstein
- Occupations: Director, Screenwriter
- Years active: 1926-1950 (film)

René Sti (1897–1951) was a Romanian-born French screenwriter and film director. He was the son-in-law of the actor André Dubosc. Of Jewish heritage the German Occupation of France in 1940 brought a halt to his film career. He was subsequently interned in Drancy internment camp. Having survived the war, he returned to filmmaking with his first post-war release Chinese Quarter in 1947.

== Selected filmography ==
- L'inconnue des six jours (1926)
- Gardez le sourire (1933)
- The Bread Peddler (1934)
- Le Bossu (1934)
- Ferdinand the Roisterer (1935)
- The Squadron's Baby (1935)
- Moutonnet (1936)
- Un scandale aux galeries (1937)
- Chinese Quarter (1947)
- Nous avons tous fait la même chose (1950)

== Bibliography ==
- Oscherwitz, Danya. Past Forward: French Cinema and the Post-Colonial Heritage. SIU Press, 2010.
- Rège, Philippe. Encyclopedia of French Film Directors, Volume 1. Scarecrow Press, 2009.
