= Romolo Bacchini =

Italian composer

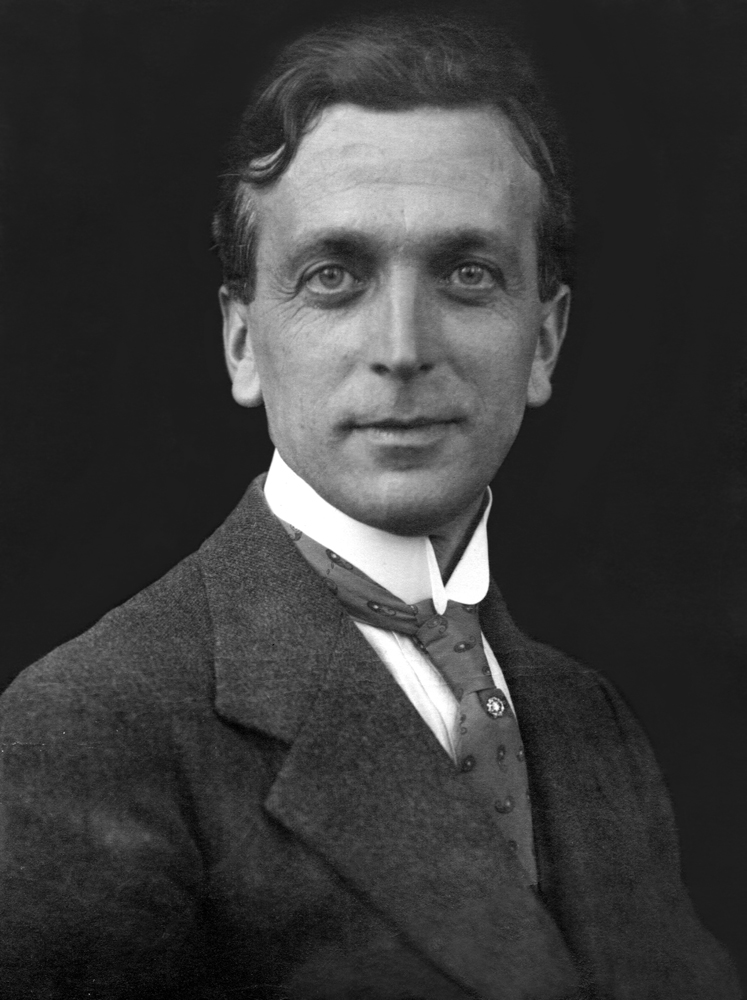
- Romolo Bacchini in the 1920s
- Born: Romolo Bachini; 11 April 1872; Rome, Italy
- Died: 27 March 1938; Rome, Italy
- Occupations: Director, musician, writer, painter
- Years active: 1893–1938

Romolo Bacchini, also credited as Bachini (11 April 1872 – 27 March 1938) was a filmmaker, musician, painter and Italian dialect poet, who spent his career during the silent film era.

== Biography ==
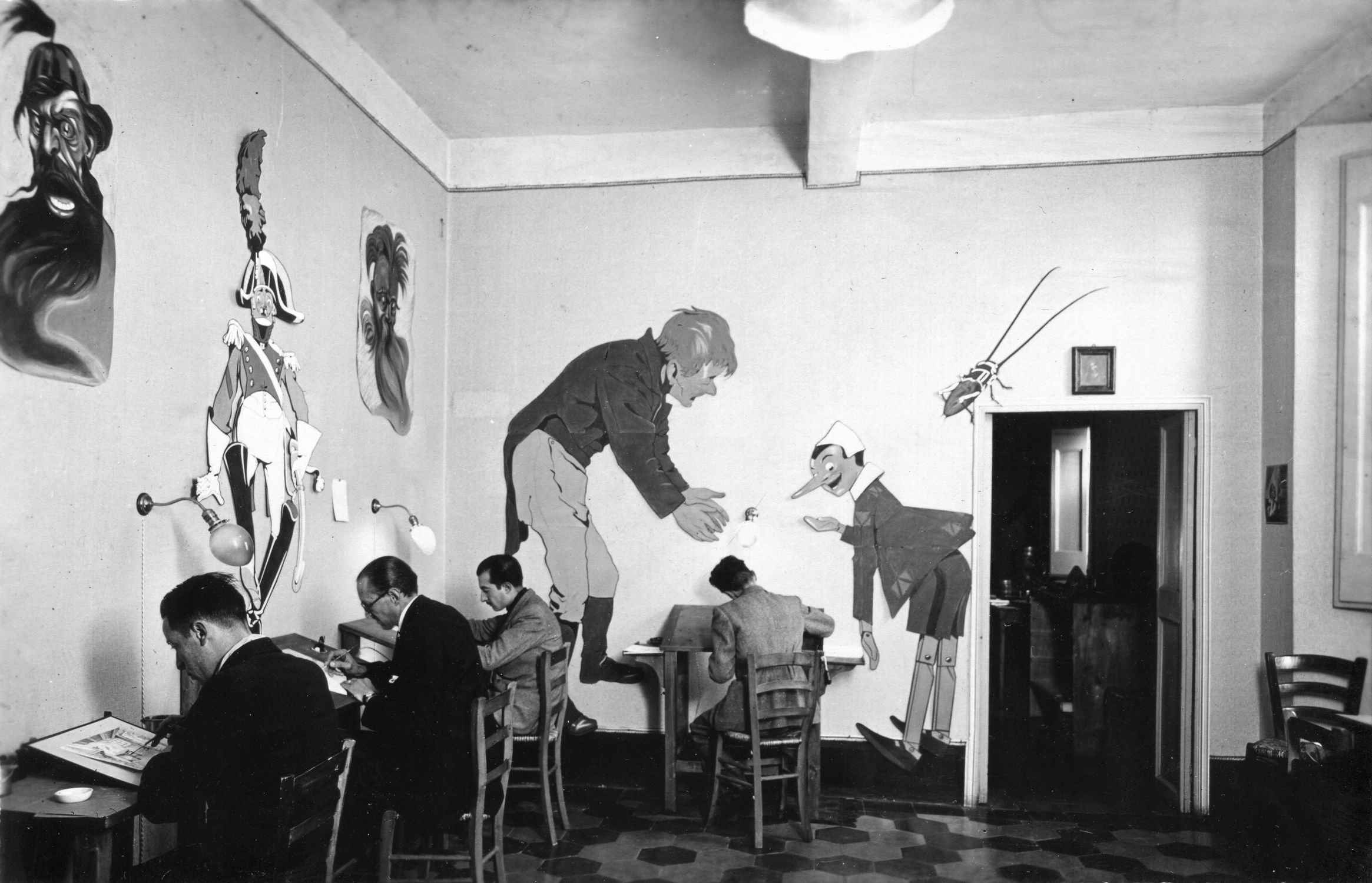
The processing of the cartoon "The Adventures of Pinocchio".

Born Romolo Bachini in Rome, Bacchini, as he later spelled it, was one of the pioneers of Italian silent cinema, directing, and sometimes acting in, more than 50 films. Some have been lost while others were recovered and restored, such as La leggenda dell'edelweiss, of which coils and the original screenplay have been found by researchers of the Museo internazionale del cinema e dello spettacolo (MICS) (International museum of film and entertainment), in 1988.

In 1909 he moved to Naples, where the fledgling movie company Vesuvio Films gave him the artistic direction of its productions. In the capital of Campania he directed many of his movies, among them the historical short film Corradino di Svevia (L'ultimo degli Hohenstaufen), one of the first Italian movies to be set in the Middle Ages.

In 1936, as art director for CAIR (Cartoni Animati Italiani Roma), he directed The Adventures of Pinocchio, which is believed to be the first animated film dedicated to the novel by Carlo Collodi.

== Complete filmography ==
=== Directed movies ===
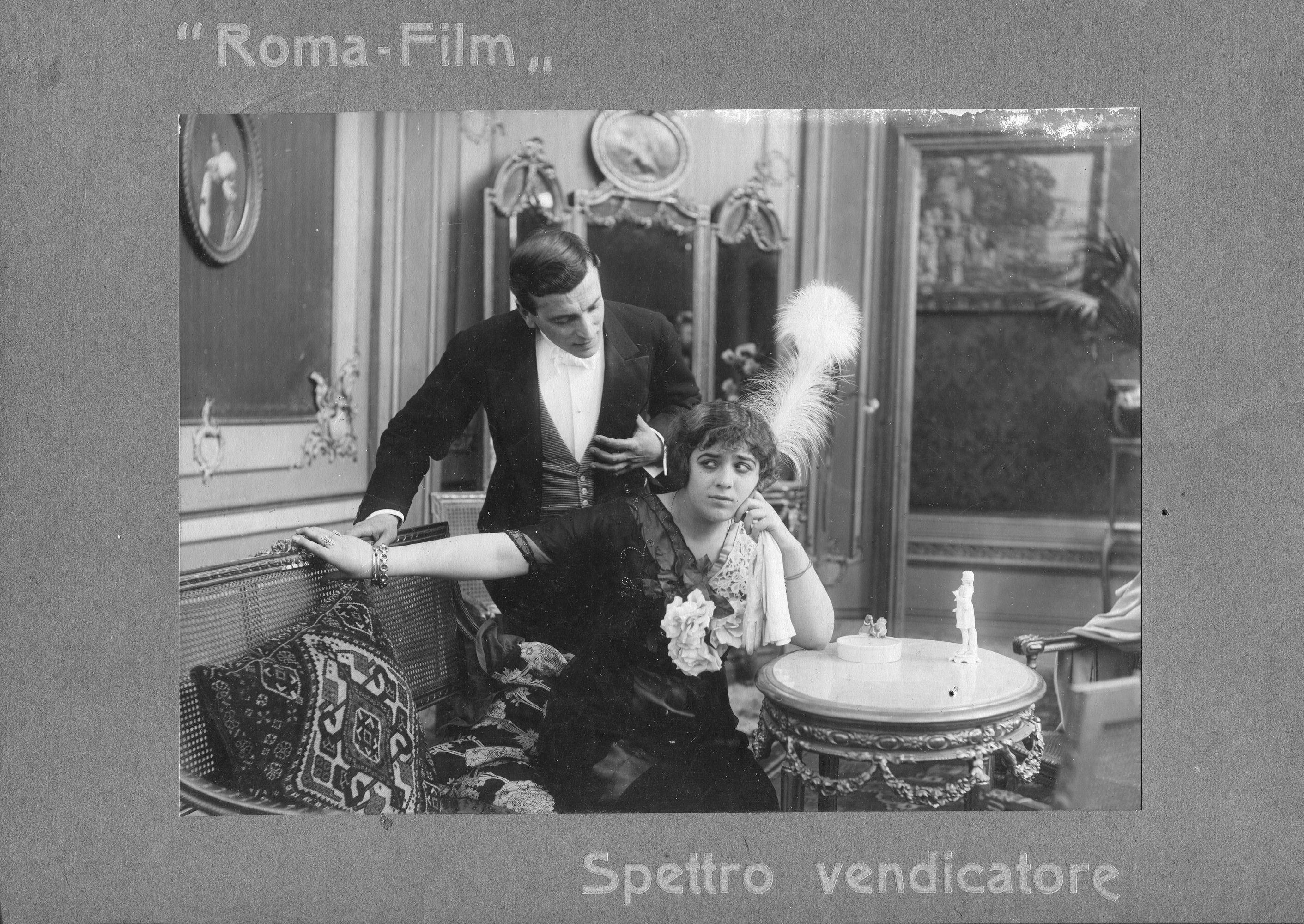
"Lo Spettro Vendicatore" (1914), in which Romolo Bacchini played both as actor and director.

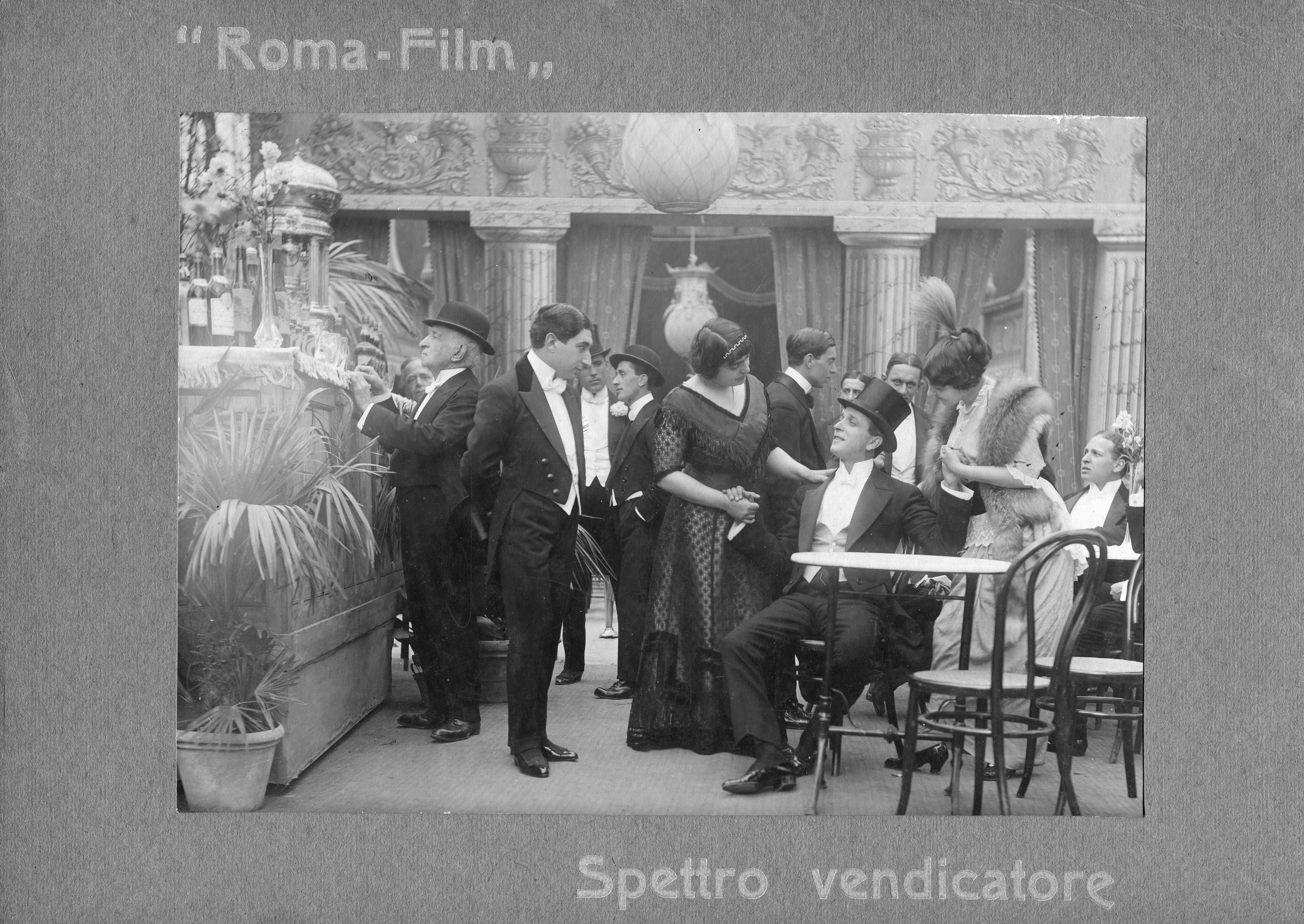
Wearing top in "Lo Spettro Vendicatore" (1914).

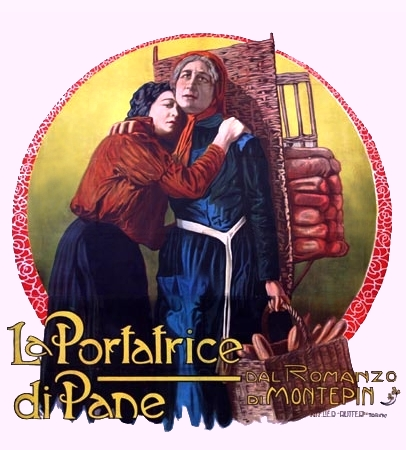
The playbill of "La portatrice di pane" (1911).

- Rolla e Michelangelo (1909)
- Per l'onore (1909)
- Odissea di una comparsa (1909)
- Nozze indiavolate (1909)
- Il ritorno del bersagliere (1909)
- Cuor di Pierrot (1909)
- Amore ed arte (1909)
- Vittima della Patria (1909)
- Odio infranto (1909)
- La vendetta dell'evaso (1909)
- Corradino di Svevia (L'ultimo degli Hohenstaufen) (1909)
- L'orologio accusatore (1909)
- Follia d'amore (1909)
- La figlia del saltimbanco (1910)
- Fermo posta (1910)
- La portatrice di pane (1911)
- Norma (Episodio della Gallia sotto il dominio di Roma Imperiale) (1911)
- Il dottore nell'ufficio (1911)
- Mondana, bandito e cavaliere (1911)
- La rivoluzione del settembre 1793 (1911)
- Adottato dal Re! (1912)
- Sotto la maschera (1913)
- Il tesoro di Kermadek (1913)
- L'artiglio spezzato (1913)
- Tragico ritorno (1914)
- Nel regno di Tersicore (1914)
- Dramma al teatro (1914)
- Insana vendetta (1914)
- Fior di passione (1914)
- Lo spettro vendicatore (1914)
- Espiazione (1914)
- Brescia, leonessa d'Italia (1915)
- Altri tempi... altri eroi (1916)
- Susanna e i vecchioni (1916)
- L'ostaggio (1916)
- La voragine (1917)
- Crevalcore (1917)
- L'artiglio del nibbio (1917)
- Il misterioso dramma del fiume (1918)
- La tigre vendicatrice (1918)
- La dama misteriosa (1918)
- Il segreto della badia (1918)
- Il trionfo di una martire (1918)
- Le gesta di John Blick (1918)
- La carezza del vampiro (1918)
- Il braccialetto misterioso (1919)
- Nel silenzio dell'anima (1919)
- L'ombra fatale (1919)
- Via Crucis (1919)
- Venere propizia (1919)
- Joseph (1920)
- Il mistero dell'uomo che sogna (1920)
- La leggenda dell'edelweiss (1922)

=== Director of photography ===
- I martiri di Belfiore (1915)
- Il tank della morte (1917)

=== Starred movies ===
- La collana del milione (1920)
- Catene di ferro e ghirlande di rose (1916)
- Susanna e i vecchioni (1916)
- Altri tempi... altri eroi (1916)
- Espiazione (1914)
- Lo spettro vendicatore (1914)
- Fior di passione (1914)

== Music ==
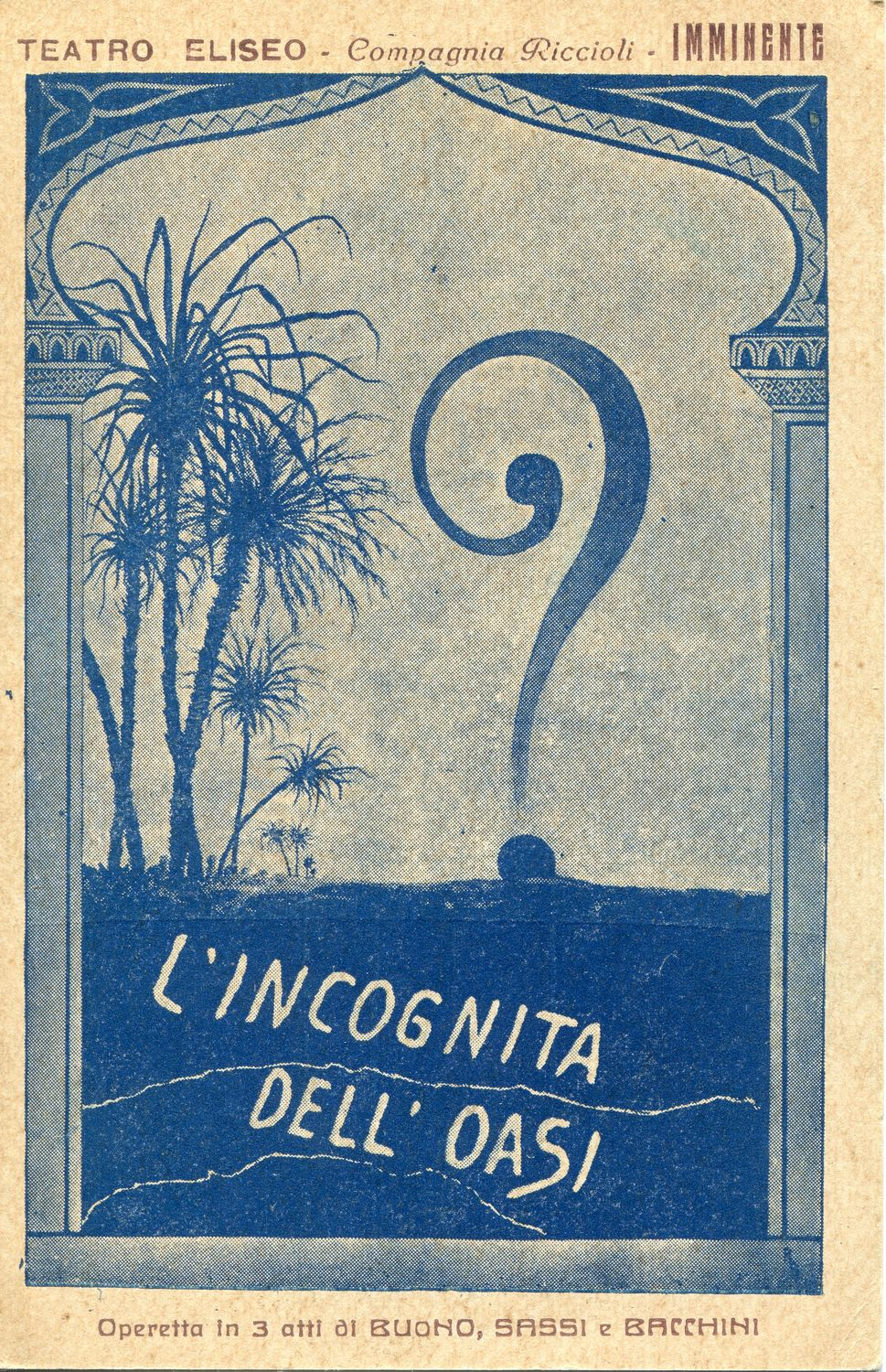
An advertising playbill for the operetta "L'incognita dell'oasi" (1920 ca.).

He graduated in composition and direction at the Conservatorio di San Pietro a Majella in Naples, and was a composer (he wrote several operas), director and conductor of the orchestra. He wrote plenty of accompanying music for films and was the first musician in the history of cinema to have composed – in 1905 – specifically created music to accompany a movie ("La Malìa dell'oro", by Filoteo Alberini).

== List of musical works (partial) ==
=== Directed operas ===
- Wanda (Fermo, Teatro dell'Aquila, 27 August 1896, libretto by Enrico Golisciani)
- Elki lo zingaro (Roma, Teatro Quirino, 12 July 1899, libretto by Augusto Turchi)
- L'abito fa il monaco (Paris, Téâtre Européen, 22 May 1902, choreography by Rossi)
- Estropiados (Marsiglia, 7 November 1902, choreography by Gautier, Rossi e Trave)
- Aprile d'amore (Roma, Teatro Argentina, 25 March 1905, libretto by Augusto Turchi)
- Incantesimo (lyrics by Conte di Lara, pseudonym of Domenico Milelli, music by Romolo Bacchini)

== Poetry ==
Contemporary and friend of poet and writer Augusto Jandolo, with him he was part of the "Gruppo dei Romanisti" as well as other intellectuals and artists who, during the charming times of Caffé Greco, animated the cultural salons of Rome. He wrote many poetical compositions, revealing himself as particularly inclined into poems, verses and sonnets in Roman dialect. In 1929 he wrote "Er Natale de Roma", a poem in blank verse and quatrains, all in Roman dialect, dealing with the birth of Rome and illustrated by the painter-ceramicist Romeo Berardi.
