= Louis-Étienne Jousserandot =

French lawyer, journalist and writer

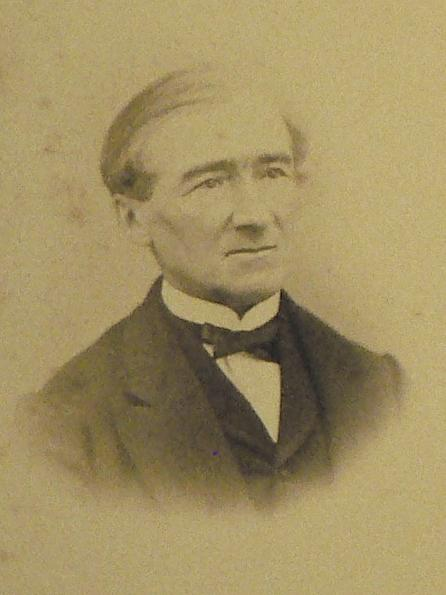
- Born: Lons-le-Saunier
- Died: 16 April 1887 (aged 73); Geneva
- Occupations: Lawyer, journalist, politician

Louis-Étienne Jousserandot (11 May 1813 – 26 April 1887) was a 19th-century French lawyer, journalist and writer. He was prefect of Pyrénées-Orientales then of Marne under the French Third Republic.

== Career ==
- September 1870 - November 1871: Prefect of Pyrénées-Orientales
- November 1871 - May 1873: Prefect of Marne

== Literary activity ==
Aa amator of the game of dominoes, Berthoud was a member of the club of Dominotiers founded circa 1838 in Paris by the sculptor Dantan le Jeune. In 1848, Jousserandot wrote an 11-page epistle in honour of the Deminotiers. It is available on line on the site Gallica of the BNF.

Le Médecin des pauvres, a novel published in 1861 by Xavier de Montépin, was the result of a real plagiarism from a book published in 1844, Le Diamant de la Vouivre by Louis Jousserandot who sued Xavier de Montépin. The latter being a famous writer and well in court and with many strong political support, his opponent could not succeed. Louis Jousserandot's claim was dismissed.

== Publications ==
- 1844: Le Diamant de la Vouivre
- 1845: Le Capitaine Lacuzon; 2 vol., Paris, L. de Potter, 1845, in-8°
- 1848: Le domino, épître à Dantan jeune et S.-H. Berthoud., publisher: impr. de Delanchy, Paris 1848, 8 p.; in-fol

=== Courses ===
Louis Jousserandot, La Civilisation moderne : cours professé à l'Académie de Lausanne, Paris, Didier, 1866, VIII-476 p., In-8°

=== Essais ===
- Louis Jousserandot: Du Pouvoir judiciaire et de son organisation en France, Paris, A. Marescq aîné, 1878, 187 p., In-8°
- Louis Jousserandot: Le Magistrat unique et le jury facultatif, Angers, impr. de A. Dedouvres, 1885, 16 p., In-8°
- Louis Jousserandot: De la Démocratie républicaine, Paris, Chevalier-Marescq, 1886, 84 p., In-8°
- Louis Jousserandot: Des Assesseurs près des tribunaux romains, Paris, Larose et Forcel, 1886, 21 p., In-8°

=== Theatre ===
- 1838: Lord Surrey, drame en 5 actes, Paris, Marchant, 28 p., Gr. in-8°
- 1847: Les Collaborateurs : comédie en 1 acte et en vers, Paris, N. Tresse, 55 p., In-8°

=== Bibliography ===
- Merlin, Pierre (2011). "Jousserandot (Louis-Étienne)". Nouveau Dictionnaire de Biographies Roussillonnaises 1789-2011. Vol. 1 Pouvoirs et société, t. 1 (A-L). Perpignan: Publications de l'olivier.
- Joseph Ramonéda, « Jousserandot, Louis-Étienne », dans La République concordataire et ses curés dans les Pyrénées-Orientales (1870-1905), Presses Universitaires de Perpignan, 2011, 168 p.
- Max Roche et Michel Vernus, « Jousserandot, Louis-Étienne », dans Dictionnaire biographique du département du Jura, Arts et littérature, 1996, 522 p
- Vincent Wright, « Jousserandot (Louis-Étienne) », dans Les préfets de Gambetta, Presses Paris Sorbonne, 2007, 482 p
