= René Le Somptier =

René Eugène Le Somptier (12 November 1884 in Caen – 23 September 1950 in Paris) was a French filmmaker and journalist.

He made his first short film, Poum à la chasse, in 1908 with his father as an actor. He was injured in World War I and after the war together with Charles Burguet made his first full-length film, La sultane de l’amour (1918).

In 1922 he produced La dame de Montsoreau based on a novel by Alexandre Dumas, starring Geneviève Félix. A colorized version was released in 1925.

== Films ==
- Poum à la chasse (1908)
- Un drame de l'air (1913)
- La sultane de l’amour (1918)
- La montée vers l'Acropole (1920)
- La dame de Montsoreau (1922)
- The Bread Peddler (1923)
- La forêt qui tue (1926)
- Le p'tit Parigot (1926) - a movie serial in 6 parts
- Le dernier conte de Shéhérazade (1937)

== Sources ==
- Hanotte, Caroline (2007-02-24). "René Le Somptier".
