= The Bread Peddler (1950 film) =

- Directed by: Maurice Cloche
- Written by: Xavier de Montépin (novel); Maurice Cloche; Yves Mirande
- Produced by: Livio Panarelli
- Starring: Vivi Gioi; Philippe Lemaire; Jean Tissier
- Cinematography: Carlo Montuori
- Edited by: Renée Gary
- Music by: Ettore Montanaro
- Production companies: Excelsa Film; Omnium International du Film
- Distributed by: Minerva Film
- Release date: 14 September 1950
- Running time: 98 minutes
- Countries: France; Italy
- Language: Italian

The Bread Peddler (French: La porteuse de pain, Italian: La portatrice di pane) is a 1950 French-Italian historical drama film directed by Maurice Cloche and starring Vivi Gioi, Philippe Lemaire and Jean Tissier. It is an adaptation of the novel The Bread Peddler by Xavier de Montépin. It was made at the Cinecittà Studios in Rome.

== Plot ==
France, 1860. In Alfortville, a town near Paris, Eng. Labroue has founded a mechanical workshop where his inventions are exploited. The engineer is assisted in his work by the chief engineer Jacques Garaud, intelligent and ambitious. Jacques Garaud has an unrequited love for Jeanne Fortier, a young widow doorkeeper in the workshop; Jeanne is the mother of two children: Georges, who lives with her mother, and Lucie, entrusted to a nurse. Jeanne is surprised by Eng. Labroue as she lights an oil lamp, which is prohibited because of the risk of fires, and is dismissed. Jacques Garaud plans to get rich by stealing the plans for a new machine designed by Eng. Labroue. Surprised by his master during the theft, Jacques kills him with a knife, sets fire to the workshop, makes believe that the fire was started by Jeanne and that he died charred. Jeanne is sentenced to life imprisonment and separated from her children.

In 1880 Jeanne escapes, goes to Paris, where she works as a bread peddler, calling herself Lise Perrin. Meanwhile, her two children are also in Paris, but both of them are unaware of their true identity: Georges, adopted by the painter Castel, has become a lawyer, Lucie is a seamstress. Jacques Garaud is also in Paris, and after assuming the identity of Paul Harmant and being widowed from a wealthy American lady, is now the owner of a factory run by Lucien Labroue, the son of Eng. Labroue assassinated in his time by Garaud. Garaud/Harmant has a daughter with a weak heart, Mary, who is in love with the young Lucien Labroue. Georges reconstructs his mother's legal case. Jacques Garaud is unmasked, daughter Mary dies of grief, Jeanne is finally reunited with her children, Lucie will marry Lucien Labroue.

== Cast ==
- Vivi Gioi as Jeanne Fortier / Lise Perrin
- Philippe Lemaire as Lucien Labroue
- Jean Tissier as Ovide Soliveau
- Gabriel Cattand as Georges Darier
- Carlo Ninchi as Jacques Garaud / Paul Harmant
- Nicole Francis as Lucie Fortier
- Giulio Battiferri
- Nino Bernardi as Castel
- Wanda Capodaglio
- Jacky Flynt as Amanda
- Giovanna Galletti as Madame Auguste
- Irene Genna as Marie Harmant
- Franco Pesce
- Georgette Tissier

== Bibliography ==
- Goble, Alan. The Complete Index to Literary Sources in Film. Walter de Gruyter, 1999.
