= The Fugitive =

A fugitive is a person fleeing from arrest.

The Fugitive, The Fugitives, Fugitive, or Fugitives may also refer to:

== Arts and entertainment ==
=== Films ===
- The Fugitive (1910 film), a film directed by D. W. Griffith set during the American Civil War
- The Fugitive (1914 film), a Russian-French short
- The Fugitive (1920 film), a French silent film directed by André Hugon
- The Fugitive (1925 film), an American silent film directed by Ben F. Wilson
- Fugitives (1929 film), an American film directed by William Beaudine
- The Fugitive (1933 film), an American western film starring Rex Bell
- The Fugitive (1939 film), the American title of the British film On the Night of the Fire
- The Fugitive (1947 film), an American film starring Henry Fonda and Dolores del Río
- The Fugitive (1947 French film), a French film directed by Robert Bibal
- The Fugitive (1965 film), a South Korean film starring Kim Ji-mee
- The Fugitive (1972 film), a Hong Kong film
- The Fugitives (1986 film), a French film directed by Francis Veber
- The Fugitive (1993 film), starring Harrison Ford and Tommy Lee Jones, based on the 1960s TV series
- Fugitives (2000 film), a Spanish drama road movie
- The Fugitive (2003 film), an Italian crime-drama film, Il fuggiasco, and its soundtrack
- The Fugitive (2019 film), an Indonesian film starring Adipati Dolken
- Fugitive (2019 film), a Nigerian film

=== Literature ===
- Fugitives (poets), a 1920s American literary circle at Vanderbilt University
- La Fugitive or Albertine disparue, the sixth volume of Marcel Proust's In Search of Lost Time
- "The Fugitive" (poem), an 1838 poem by Mikhail Lermontov
- The Fugitive (Ugo Betti play), a 1953 play by Ugo Betti
- The Fugitive, a 1913 play by John Galsworthy
- The Fugitive, a novel by Pramoedya Ananta Toer
- The Fugitives (novel), a 1908 novel by Johannes Linnankoski
- "Fugitives", a 2019 poem by Simon Armitage to commemorate 70 years of AONBs

=== Music ===
- The Fugitives (band), a 1960s California garage-rock band
- The Fugitives (spoken word), a Canadian music and spoken-word ensemble
- The Fugitive (album), a 1983 album by Tony Banks
- "Fugitive" (song), a 2008 song by David Gray
- "Fugitive", a song by Danger Danger from the album Revolve
- "Fugitive", a song by the Pet Shop Boys from Fundamental
- "The Fugitive" (song), a 1966 song by Merle Haggard
- "The Fugitive", a song by Debbie Harry from the album Debravation
- "The Fugitive", a song by Iron Maiden from Fear of the Dark

=== Painting ===
- The Fugitive (painting), an 1800 artwork by John Opie

=== Television ===
- The Fugitive (1963 TV series), a 1963–1967 American series starring David Janssen
- The Fugitive (2000 TV series), a 2000–2001 American remake of the 1960s series
- The Fugitive (2020 TV series), a 2020 American remake of the 1960s series
- The Fugitives (TV series), a 2005 British children's series
- Fugitive, the fourth volume of episodes in Heroes (season 3)
- "The Fugitive" (The Twilight Zone), a 1962 episode of the anthology
- "Fugitive" (The Professionals), a 1980 episode of the crime-action drama
- "The Fugitive" (Auf Wiedersehen, Pet), a 1984 episode
- "The Fugitive" (The Upper Hand), a 1992 sitcom episode
- "The Fugitives" (Wander Over Yonder), a 2013 episode of the animated series
- "Fugitive" (Star Wars: The Clone Wars), a 2014 episode of the animated series
- "The Fugitive" (Brooklyn Nine-Nine), a 2017 two-part episode of the police sitcom
- "Fugitive" (Grimm), a 2017 episode of the supernatural drama

== Other uses ==
- Fugitive (game), an outdoor tag game
- fugitive.vim, a plugin for the Vim text editor

== See also ==
- Fugitive pigment, pigments that change over time
