= Films Albatros =

French film company

- Industry: Film
- Founded: 1922
- Founder: Noë Bloch; Maurice Hache; Alexandre Kamenka

Films Albatros was a French film production company established in 1922. It was formed by a group of White Russian exiles who had been forced to flee following the 1917 Russian Revolution and subsequent Russian Civil War. Initially, the firm's personnel consisted mainly of Russian exiles, but over time, French actors and directors were employed by the company. Its operations continued until the late 1930s.

== History ==
Because of the difficult working conditions in Russia after the Revolution of 1917, the film producer Joseph Ermolieff decided to move his operations to Paris, where he had connections with the Pathé company. Arriving in 1920 with a group of close associates, Ermolieff took over a studio in Montreuil-sous-Bois in the eastern suburbs of Paris and began making films through his company, Ermolieff-Cinéma. His co-founder of the company was Alexandre Kamenka, another Russian exile, and when Ermolieff moved to Germany in 1922, Kamenka, together with his colleagues Noë Bloch and Maurice Hache, took over the company and re-established it as the Société des Films Albatros. He also set up a distribution company called Les Films Armor in order to control the distribution of his own films. Various explanations have been given for the choice of the name Albatros: the name of a boat which brought some of the émigrés from Russia; a symbol of White Russia; an incident with an albatros on the journey. As well as adopting the image of the albatros as its symbol, the company took the motto "Debout dans la tempête" ("upright in the storm").

Among the group of Russian artists who stayed to work with Albatros were the directors Victor Tourjansky and Alexandre Volkoff, the art director Alexandre Lochakoff, the costume designer Boris Bilinsky, and the actors Ivan Mosjoukine, Nathalie Lissenko, Nicolas Koline, and Nicolas Rimsky. Although this Russian company initially favoured Russian themes, Kamenka quickly realised the need for greater integration with French film production, and they turned increasingly to French subjects. In 1924, a number of Kamenka's Russian associates left Albatros, and Kamenka offered opportunities to several innovative French film-makers, including Jean Epstein, Jacques Feyder, Marcel L'Herbier and René Clair.

Kamenka's production policy combined prestige projects with openly commercial films, and his consistent record made him the most successful French producer during the 1920s, according to Charles Spaak, who came to the company as a script-writer in 1928. Kamenka successfully achieved international distribution for many of his films (even in Soviet Russia, with which his company had so little political sympathy) and from 1927 he entered into co-production arrangements with production companies in other European countries, driven by growing financial difficulties in the French film industry. The arrival of sound pictures posed a serious difficulty for Albatros, which had hitherto relied considerably upon Russian actors, especially Mosjoukine, whose accent precluded a successful transition into the talking era.

The company's output diminished in the 1930s, but it achieved one further artistic success of note when Jean Renoir joined them for his 1936 adaptation of Gorki's Les Bas-fonds. By this time, Albatros was the longest surviving film company operating in France, but with the outbreak of World War II, Kamenka wound up the company which had remained particularly associated with silent cinema.

== Films produced by Albatros ==
- 1922 : Nuit de carnaval (dir. Victor Tourjansky)
- 1923 : Calvaire d'amour (dir. Victor Tourjansky)
- 1923 : Le Chant de l'amour triomphant (dir. Victor Tourjansky)
- 1923 : La Maison du mystère (dir. Alexandre Volkoff)
- 1923 : Le Brasier ardent (dir. Ivan Mosjoukine)
- 1924 : Ce cochon de Morin (dir. Victor Tourjansky)
- 1924 : Le Chiffonnier de Paris (dir. Serge Nadejdine)
- 1924 : La Cible (dir. Serge Nadejdine)
- 1924 : La Dame masquée (dir. Victor Tourjansky)
- 1924 : L'Heureuse Mort (dir. Serge Nadejdine)
- 1924 : Kean (dir. Alexandre Volkoff)
- 1924 : Le Lion des Mogols (dir. Jean Epstein)
- 1924 : Les Ombres qui passent (dir. Alexandre Volkoff)
- 1925 : Les Aventures de Robert Macaire (dir. Jean Epstein)
- 1925 : Le Double Amour (dir. Jean Epstein)
- 1925 : Le Nègre blanc (dir. Serge Nadejdine, Nicolas Rimsky and Henry Wulschleger)
- 1925 : Paris en cinq jours (dir. Nicolas Rimsky and Pierre Colombier)
- 1926 : Carmen (dir. Jacques Feyder)
- 1926 : Feu Mathias Pascal (dir. Marcel L'Herbier)
- 1926 : Gribiche (dir. Jacques Feyder)
- 1926 : Jim la houlette, roi des voleurs (dir. Pierre Colombier, Roger Lion and Nicolas Rimsky)
- 1927 : Le Chasseur de chez Maxim's (dir. Roger Lion et Nicolas Rimsky)
- 1927 : Nocturne (dir. Marcel Silver) (short)
- 1927 : La Proie du vent (dir. René Clair)
- 1928 : La condesa María (dir. Benito Perojo)
- 1928 : Les Deux Timides (dir. René Clair)
- 1928 : La Tour (dir. René Clair) (short)
- 1928 : Un chapeau de paille d'Italie (dir. René Clair)
- 1929 : Cagliostro - Liebe und Leben eines großen Abenteurers (dir. Richard Oswald)
- 1929 : Harmonies de Paris (dir. Lucie Derain) (short)
- 1929 : Les Nouveaux Messieurs (dir. Jacques Feyder)
- 1929 : Baccarat (dir. Adelqui Migliar) (short)
- 1930 : Le Procureur Hallers (dir. Robert Wiene)
- 1931 : Le Monsieur de minuit (dir. Harry Lachman)
- 1932 : Il a été perdu une mariée (dir. Léo Joannon)
- 1932 : Un coup de téléphone (dir. Georges Lacombe)
- 1933 : La Femme invisible (dir. Georges Lacombe)
- 1934 : Le Bossu ou le petit parisien (dir. René Sti)
- 1934 : La Porteuse de pain (dir. René Sti)
- 1936 : Les Bas-fonds (dir. Jean Renoir)
- 1937 : Le Messager (dir. Raymond Rouleau)
- 1938 : Grisou (dir. Maurice de Canonge)
- 1939 : La vie est magnifique (dir. Maurice Cloche)
