= Nicolas Koline =

Russian actor

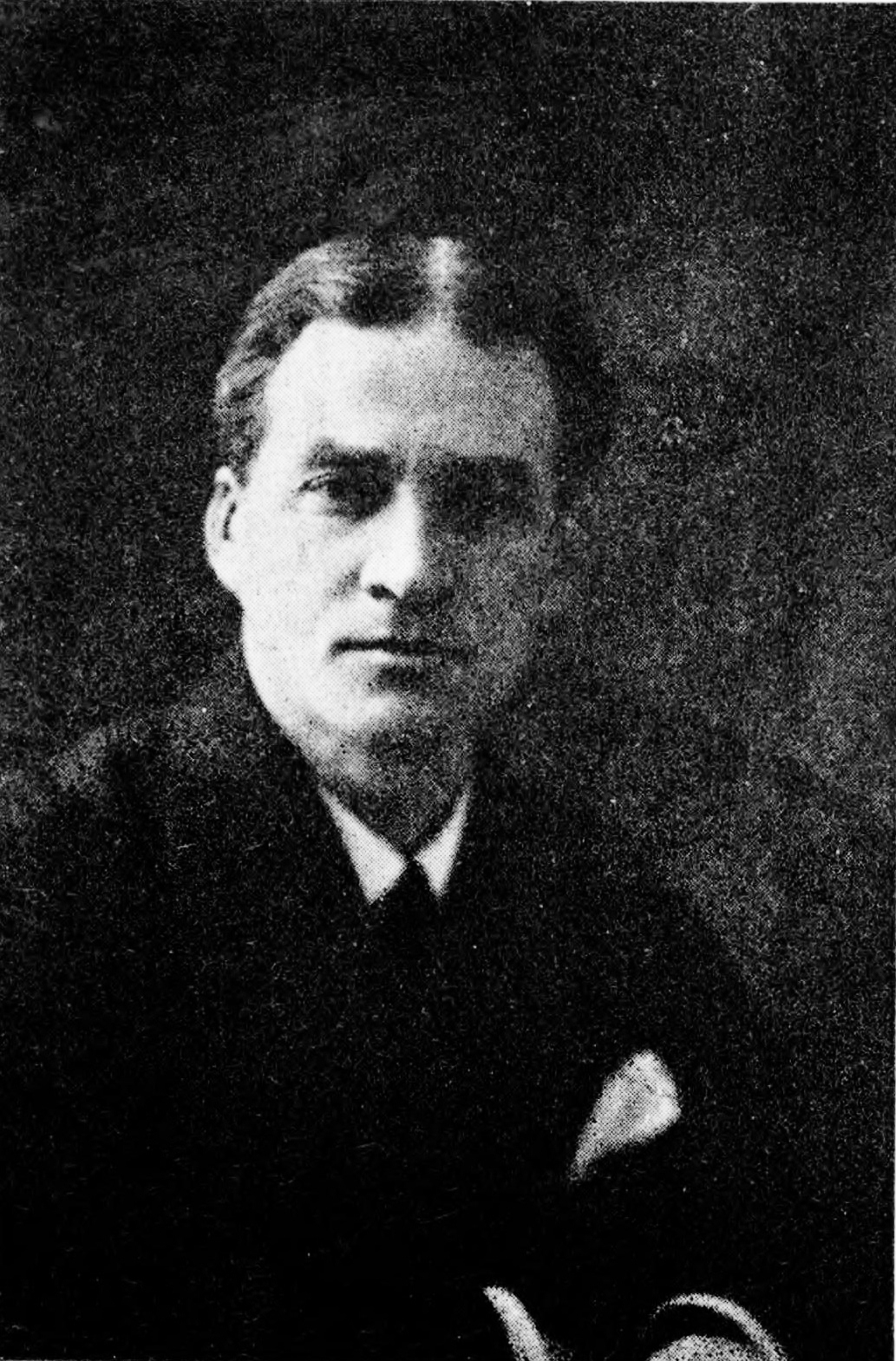
- Born: 7 May 1878; Saint Petersburg, Russian Empire
- Died: 3 June 1973 (aged 95); Nyack, New York, United States
- Other name: Nikolai Fjodorowitsch Kolin
- Occupation: Actor
- Years active: 1920-1955 (film)

Nicolas Fjodorowitsch Koline (1878–1973) was a Russian stage and film actor. Before spending life in film, he began training as a teacher, retraining as an actor in 1907.He established himself in Russia as a stage performer with the First Studio of the Moscow Art Theatre. During his time at MAT he was known for performing in shows such as Twelfth Night, Click on the Furnace, and Selie Stepanchikov. As well as this, he worked alongside other students to stage the opera Eugene Onegin. He emigrated from Russia in 1920 after the October Revolution of 1917 alongside a Polish colleague named Richard Boleslavsky, staying in Poland for a time. In Poland, there were no theaters using the Russian language and for the time being he gave lectures on Russian literature until he could afford to move further. He later came to France where he first began starred in films featuring Russian immigrants such as L'Angoissante aventure, Lea Brasier ardent, Le Chant de l'amour triumphant, and Kean. He later worked with the La Chauve-Souris cabaret run by Nikita Balieff. In Paris he then joined Joseph Ermolieff's film company at Montreuil. Starting in 1928, he moved to Munich, Germany and began to star in German films such as Geheimnisse des Orients as well as the French-German film Varieté. In 1947, after a gap in his career due to World War II, still living in Germany, he continued his career in film, namely with director Victor Tourjansky. In 1955, he ended his career in film after his role in Der Frontogeckel and moved to the United States with his wife in Najak, New York in 1956 where he lived the rest of his days in relative poverty. In 1963, his wife died and was buried by him, with his own life ending eight years later in 1973 in Nyack, New York.

== Selected filmography ==
- 1923: L'Angoissante aventure / The Sad Adventure (dir. Yakov Protazanov)
- 1923: Le Chant de l'amour triumphant (dir. Victor Tourjansky)
- 1923: La Maison du mystère / The House of Mystery (dir. Alexandre Volkoff)
- 1923: Le Brasier ardent (dir. Ivan Mosjoukine)
- 1924: Kean ou Désordre et génie / Kean (dir. Alexandre Volkoff)
- 1924: Âme d'artiste / Heart of an Actress (dir. Germaine Dulac)
- 1926: Michel Strogoff (dir. Victor Tourjansky)
- 1926: 600,000 francs par mois / 600,000 Francs a Month (dir. Nicolas Koline and Robert Péguy)
- 1927: Napoléon (dir. Abel Gance)
- 1927: Croquette (dir. Louis Mercanton)
- 1928: Hurrah! Ich lebe! / Hurrah! I Live! (dir. Wilhelm Thiele)
- 1928: Geheimnisse des Orients / Shéhérazade / Secrets of the Orient (dir. Alexandre Volkoff)
- 1935: Varieté / Variety (dir. Nicolas Farkas)
- 1937: Patrioten / Patriots (dir. Karl Ritter)
- 1937: Menschen ohne Vaterland / Men Without a Fatherland (dir. Herbert Maisch)
- 1938: Geheimzeichen LB 17 / Secret Code LB 17 (dir. Victor Tourjansky)
- 1939: Alarm auf Station III / Alarm at Station III (dir. Philipp Lothar Mayring)
- 1939: Der Gouverneur / The Governor (dir. Victor Tourjansky)
- 1940: Feinde / Enemies (dir. Victor Tourjansky)
- 1942: Anschlag auf Baku / Attack on Baku (dir. Fritz Kirchhoff)
- 1943: Johann
- 1944: Orient-Express (dir. Victor Tourjansky)
- 1948: Die Zeit mit dir / The Time with You (dir. George Hurdalek)
- 1948: Film ohne Titel / Film Without a Title (dir. Rudolf Jugert)
- 1948: Der Apfel ist ab / The Original Sin (dir. Helmut Käutner)
- 1949: Der blaue Strohhut / The Blue Straw Hat (dir. Victor Tourjansky)
- 1949: Nachtwache / Keepers of the Night (dir. Harald Braun)
- 1950: Der Mann, der sich selber sucht / The Man in Search of Himself (dir. Géza von Cziffra)
- 1950: Die Treppe / The Staircase (dir. Alfred Braun and Wolfgang Staudte)
- 1951: Der Tiger Akbar / The Tiger Akbar (dir. Harry Piel)
- 1952: Cuba Cabana (dir. Fritz Peter Buch)
- 1952: Lockende Sterne / Shooting Stars (dir. Hans Müller)
- 1952: Gift im Zoo / Poison in the Zoo (dir. Hans Müller and Wolfgang Staudte)
- 1953: Salto Mortale (dir. Victor Tourjansky)
- 1954: Der letzte Sommer / The Last Summer (dir. Harald Braun)
- 1954: Bildnis einer Unbekannten / Portrait of an Unknown Woman (dir. Helmut Käutner)
- 1955: Der dunkle Stern / The Dark Star (dir. Hermann Kugelstadt)
