= Le Double Amour =

1925 film directed by Jean Epstein

- Film poster
- Directed by: Jean Epstein
- Written by: Jean Epstein; Marie Epstein
- Produced by: Alexandre Kamenka
- Starring: Jean Angelo; Nathalie Lissenko; Camille Bardou; Pierre Batcheff
- Cinematography: Maurice Desfassiaux
- Production company: Films Albatros
- Distributed by: Films Armor
- Release date: 27 November 1925
- Running time: 103 minutes
- Country: France
- Languages: Silent film French intertitles

Le Double Amour (1925) by Jean Epstein

Le Double Amour (Double Love) is a 1925 French melodrama film directed by Jean Epstein and produced by the Films Albatros production company.

== Plot ==
Saint Blaise sur mer, 1904: Countess Laure Maresco sings for a charitable event at the Casino. She is told by her lover Jacques Prémont-Solène, son of a famous automobile manufacturer, that he has lost at Baccarat the money of the charity event that she had entrusted to him. When he threatens to commit suicide, she tells him that she will take the blame for the theft. Thanks to Baron de Curgis, a rich man in love with her, the scandal is avoided but she is ruined. In Paris, Jacques' father refuses to give him money and sends him to the United States to show what he can do by himself. Jacques writes her a letter confessing the theft and informing her that his father has forced him to go to America to start a new life. She considers suicide in front of the sea, but the fact that she is expecting a baby from Jacques gives her a new reason to live.

1924: Laure is now a renowned music-hall artist. Her son Jacques has inherited his father's addiction to gaming and Laure spends a large part of her money to reimburse his losses. Jacques Prémont-Solène, who has made a fortune in the United States, is back in France for his business. A friend takes him to a casino where he wins a large sum from his unknown son. When he wants to cash his chips, he is told that some of them, which are brand new, were stolen. From his description of the young man from whom he had won the chips, young Jacques is easily identified and arrested. He begs his mother to help him. Laure remembers the letter written by her lover twenty years earlier. She changes the date on the letter from 1904 to 1924 and brings it to the police claiming that Jacques Prémont-Solène is the thief. He confesses and, as he offers to reimburse the money, the Casino agrees to withdraw its complaint. Jacques proposes to take his son to America to secure his future and Laure agrees to accompany them.

== Cast ==
J. Angelo and N. Lissenko

- Nathalie Lissenko as Laure Maresco
- Jean Angelo as Jacques Prémont-Solène
- Camille Bardou as Baron de Curgis
- Pierre Batcheff as Jacques Maresco

== Production and reception ==
This is the third film, after The Lion of the Moguls and L'Affiche (fr), directed by Jean Epstein for Films Albatros. While this gave him access to the important financial means of the Russian Cinema School of Paris, it imposed on him to give a more commercial nature to his films.

The dresses for Nathalie Lissenko ware supplied by the great fashion designer Paul Poiret and indoor scenes were shot at the Albatros studios in Montreuil with spectacular Art Deco sets designed by Pierre Kéfer. Outdoor scenes were shot mostly on location in Cannes.

While the film was a success at the box office, some of the critics regretted that Epstein was moving away from the Avant-garde style shown in his earlier films such as Cœur fidèle. Henri Langlois on the other hand wrote: "You only need to screen one reel of Faithful Heart and one reel of Double Love to realize Epstein's progress. Despite his profession of faith, he had been able to assimilate the human element, get rid of this kind of rupture caused by the disproportion between the vigour and mastery of his technique and the poverty of his direction of actors."

== Restoration ==
The film was reconstructed in 1986 on the basis of the original camera negative acquired by the Cinémathèque Française in 1958. In 2009 a new tinted version close to the original colours and including a few supplementary scenes was produced with the help from the Franco-American Cultural Fund on the basis of the original negative and of a period tinted copy.
