= The Lower Depths (1936 film) =

1936 film directed by Jean Renoir

- Theatrical release poster
- Directed by: Jean Renoir
- Written by: Yevgeni Zamyatin; Jacques Companéez; Jean Renoir; Charles Spaak
- Based on: The Lower Depths; 1902 play by Maxim Gorky
- Produced by: Alexandre Kamenka
- Starring: Jean Gabin; Suzy Prim; Louis Jouvet
- Cinematography: Fédote Bourgasoff
- Edited by: Marguerite Renoir
- Music by: Jean Wiener
- Production company: Films Albatros
- Distributed by: Gaumont-Franco Film-Aubert
- Release dates: 11 December 1936 (France); 10 September 1937 (US)
- Running time: 95 minutes
- Country: France
- Language: French

The Lower Depths (French: Les bas-fonds) is a 1936 French drama film directed by Jean Renoir and starring Jean Gabin, Suzy Prim and Louis Jouvet. It is based on the 1902 play of the same title by Maxim Gorky. Its scenes contrast the life of the upper and lower classes to comedic effect. It was shot at the Epinay Studios of Eclair and on location between Epinay and Saint-Denis on the Seine. The film's sets were designed by the art director Eugène Lourié.

It received the first Louis Delluc Prize in 1937. The National Board of Review in the United States considered it a Top Ten Foreign Film for 1937.

== Plot ==
A wealthy baron (Jouvet) becomes bankrupt through gambling. Contemplating suicide, he finds his gun missing and confronts the thief Pépel (Gabin) who plans to rob him. Instead they share "a drink between colleagues" in a scene played as light comedy and become friends. The baron allows Pépel to leave with a bronze sculpture. Creditors seize the baron's household furnishings. The baron tells his servant Félix that he hopes all that Félix has stolen from him will cover his unpaid wages, to which Félix agrees. Pépel is arrested for stealing the bronze. Pépel jokes with the police until the baron arrives to identify him as a "dear friend". The story shifts to life in the slums, where men argue at cards. They mock a woman who reads romantic tales, and many individuals have brief character portraits. The baron arrives to become a lodger in the slums and Pépel sets him up with a bed. The baron joins the card game.

The police inspector meets with the slum landlord Kostylev and eyes his wife's sister Natasha. Pépel speaks with Vassilissa, regretting he never loved her but remembering their good times. She wants him to kill her husband, the landlord, who is old and mean. A scene of mourning for a woman who has died follows, with fatalistic comments from the neighbors. Pépel tells Natasha she should leave with him, but she says she'll leave for a man with a job, not a thief like him. Vassilissa finds them speaking and is jealous. The woman who reads romances recounts them to the baron and Natasha as if they were her own adventures. The police inspector tells the landlord an inspection has been ordered. Trying to devise a way to bribe him, the landlord and his wife suggest her sister Natasha. Vassilissa persuades Natasha to serve the inspector tea, though Natasha has declared he disgusts her. The inspector invites Natasha on a date and she cries, but he promises her a better life.

Pépel and the baron discuss life along the river bank. Pépel believes only leaving with Natasha could save him from going to prison one day like his father before him. The inspector and Natasha dine alone indoors while other couples dine outdoors as a band plays. She resists his advances. Those partying outside include Pépel, pursued by Vassilissa. She tells him Natasha is not the innocent dreamer he imagines. Pépel find Natasha drunkenly enjoying the inspector's company. The men fight and Pépel leads Natasha away as the inspector cries for help. Pépel and Natasha confess their love.

Kostylev and Vassilissa insist Natasha make up with the inspector. They beat her and the whole neighborhood listens. Pépel intervenes and soon all the lodgers join him in attacking their hated landlord. The fight ends with Kostylev dead, though no one appears responsible. Vassilissa denounces Pépel to the police as a murderer. The baron tells them it was a brawl and everyone is guilty. Others say how they participated and that "the lower depths killed him". The police find Pépel comforting Natasha and lead him away.

In an epilogue, Vassilissa leaves the slum, Natasha brings Pépel home from prison, and the slum's strangest resident, a combination madman and drunkard called "the actor", commits suicide. Natasha and Pépel take to the road with just a few possessions.

== Cast ==
- Jean Gabin as Wasska Pépel
- Suzy Prim as Vassilissa Kostyleva
- Louis Jouvet as The Baron
- Jany Holt as Nastia
- Vladimir Sokoloff as Kostylev
- Robert Le Vigan as The Alcoholic Actor
- Camille Bert as The Count
- René Génin as Louka
- Paul Temps as Satine
- Robert Ozanne as Jabot de Travers
- Henri Saint-Isle as Kletsch
- Junie Astor as Natascha
- Maurice Baquet as Alouchka

== Reception ==
Writing for Night and Day in 1937, Graham Greene gave the film a mild mixed review. Describing the film as "a slow agreeable undistinguished picture", Greene finds the production "oddly stagy and unconvincing" in its depiction of poverty. Film historian François Poulle considered the film to have begun the group of poetic realism films produced in the years before the Second World War.

== See also ==
- The Lower Depths (1957 film)
- Cinema of France
- List of French language films

== Bibliography ==
- Bergan, Ronald. Jean Renoir: Projections of Paradise. Skyhorse, 2016.
- O'Shaughnessy, Martin. Jean Renoir. Manchester University Press, 2019.
