= Hurrah! I Live! =

1928 film

- Directed by: Wilhelm Thiele
- Written by: Friedrich Raff; Julius Urgiß
- Based on: Der mutige Seefahrer (play) by Georg Kaiser
- Produced by: Noë Bloch; Gregor Rabinovitch
- Starring: Nicolas Koline; Max Gülstorff; Alexej Bondireff
- Cinematography: Fédote Bourgasoff; Curt Courant
- Music by: Willy Schmidt-Gentner
- Production company: UFA
- Distributed by: UFA
- Release date: 21 December 1928
- Country: Germany
- Languages: Silent; German intertitles

Hurrah! I Live! (German: Hurrah! Ich lebe!) is a 1928 German silent comedy film directed by Wilhelm Thiele and starring Nicolas Koline, Max Gülstorff, and Alexej Bondireff. It was adapted from the play Der mutige Seefahrer by Georg Kaiser.

The film's sets were designed by the art directors Max Knaake and Vladimir Meingard

== Cast ==
- Nicolas Koline as Pieter Kruis
- Max Gülstorff as Jens
- Alexej Bondireff as Niels
- Nathalie Lissenko as Johanne Kruis
- Gustav Fröhlich as Hendrik Hansen
- Betty Astor as Mabel Jefferson
- Dimitri Dimitriev
- Fritz Greiner
- Walia Ostermann
- Georg H. Schnell as Joe Jefferson

== Bibliography ==
- Bock, Hans-Michael; Bergfelder, Tim, eds. (2009). The Concise Cinegraph: Encyclopaedia of German Cinema. New York: Berghahn Books. ISBN 978-1-57181-655-9.
