= Penzensky =

Penzensky (masculine), Penzenskaya (feminine), or Penzenskoye (neuter) may refer to:

- Penzensky District, a district of Penza Oblast, Russia
- Penza Oblast (Penzenskaya oblast), a federal subject of Russia
- Penzenskoye, a rural locality (a selo) in Sakhalin Oblast, Russia
