= Le Brasier ardent =

1923 film by Ivan Mosjoukine

- Poster for the film
- Directed by: Ivan Mosjoukine
- Written by: Ivan Mosjoukine
- Starring: Ivan Mosjoukine; Nathalie Lissenko; Nicolas Koline
- Cinematography: Joseph-Louis Mundwiller; Nicolas Toporkoff
- Production company: Films Albatros
- Distributed by: Pathé Consortium Cinéma
- Release date: 1 June 1923 (France)
- Running time: 106 minutes (2196 metres)
- Country: France
- Language: Silent (French intertitles)

Le Brasier ardent is a 1923 French film directed by Ivan Mosjoukine. It combines elements of comedy, mystery, romance and psychological drama. The title has been variously translated into English as The Blazing Inferno, The Burning Crucible, The Burning Brazier, The Burning Cauldron, and Burning Embers.

== Plot ==
Le Brasier ardent (1923)

A woman, known only as Elle ("She"), has a nightmare in which she encounters a man chained to a tree above a blazing pyre into which he tries to pull her by the hair, an elegant gentleman in evening dress who pursues her into an opium den full of dazed women, a bishop who instructs her to return to her home, and a ragged beggar who attempts to embrace her before stabbing himself. Upon waking she realises that they each had the features of Z, a detective and master of disguise whose memoirs she has been reading in bed. Her wealthy husband, whom she married after he had saved her from drowning, is concerned about her mental state and her diminishing affection for him. He wants to take her away from the temptations of Paris, back to his home country in South America, but his plan is impeded by her resistance and by a burglary in which some important documents have been stolen. The husband hires a detective agency to recover the documents and to find the means of restoring his wife's affection; the detective assigned to his case is Z.

Z quickly works out that the burglary was faked by Elle in order to obstruct her husband from taking her away from her beloved Paris. While pretending to continue his search for the documents, Z extends his acquaintance with Elle and realises that they are falling in love with each other. In order to fulfil his contract with the husband, Z goes to a nightclub with Elle and stages a contest of endurance dancing for women, in which the winner seemingly dances herself to death. Elle is so distraught by this that she rushes home and begs her husband to take her away from the odious city.

The husband arranges their immediate departure on a transatlantic liner. Z hands over the missing documents and stoically makes his farewell to the couple. At the port of Le Havre, the husband tells his wife that he has forgotten to give Z his promised fee and he asks her to travel quickly to Paris to deliver it in person. As Elle and Z are re-united, a letter from the husband tells them that he has understood his wife's change of affection and he gives them his blessing, as he departs alone.

== Cast ==
- Ivan Mosjoukine as Detective Z
- Nathalie Lissenko as the woman ("Elle")
- Nicolas Koline as the husband
- Camille Bardou as the President of the Club
- Madame Lacroix (credited as Madame A. de la Croix) as Z's grandmother

== Production ==
After a group of Russian film technicians and actors left the new Soviet Republic and established themselves at Montreuil in Paris in 1920, Ivan Mosjoukine became not only their leading star but also wrote scenarios and had the opportunity to direct his first film, L'Enfant du carnaval, in 1921. In 1922 Mosjoukine wrote and directed his second film, Le Brasier ardent, as one of the first productions for Films Albatros, and he again drew upon many of his Russian compatriots for his team: the actors Nathalie Lissenko (Mosjoukine's wife) and Nicolas Koline, the set designers Alexandre Lochakoff and Edouard Gosch, and the cameraman Nikolai Toporkoff, who shared the filming with Joseph-Louis Mundwiller. The setting however was entirely French with much location work done in Paris and some in Marseille.

In his preparatory notes for the production, Mosjoukine wrote that his subject was the love between a man and a woman, and it made no claim to originality or to moral or philosophical significance. It was an old theme which remained eternally fresh: "It is She and He, caught by surprise by the camera lens at the moment of their unexpected meeting. A presentiment separates them against their will, to give way in the end to a mutual attraction." He also indicated that he wanted to construct the film upon contrasts, alternating dramatic highlights with "the comedy of life".

The mixture of styles made the film difficult to label with any specific genre but it placed it firmly among the avant-garde trends of French cinema, perhaps drawing on developments in current American and German films, as well as imitating French genres of the serial, the melodrama, and fantasy. "The film thus juxtaposes, like so many bravura episodes, various 'styles' (the smoky dream of the opening scene, the dark streets with sparse street-lamps, the farcical comedy of a detective agency, the sentimental scenes, etc.) as demanded by the plot-pretext."

The film features two sequences of rapid editing, a practice then in vogue among French avant-garde film-makers (following Abel Gance's notable demonstrations of it in La Roue, released early in 1923). One is used in the first section of the opening nightmare scene, conveying the woman's sense of panic as she is pulled ever closer to the flames of the burning pyre. The second occurs in the dance contest, as the accelerating pace of the music and dancing is reflected in the impressionistic fragments of the editing rhythm.

== Reception ==
The film was first released in an exclusive run at the Salle Marivaux in Paris beginning on 1 June 1923. It attracted considerable attention and admiring responses from a number of critics and commentators. Jean Mitry was one who judged that Mosjoukine, hitherto known as a great actor, had now shown himself to be capable of becoming a great director as well; and while his film did not offer novelty of technique or visual style, he had taken his inspiration from what was best in present-day film-makers, such as Abel Gance, Marcel L'Herbier, Louis Delluc, and Léon Poirier.

The film theorist Ricciotto Canudo praised the freshness and ambition of Mosjoukine's conception, and his ability to construct a genuinely symbolic drama, but he expressed reservations about the mixture of visual styles ("visionary and magnificent" at the beginning but lapsing later into "an often irritating realism" of sentimental comedy). Nevertheless, he asserted the significance of Mosjoukine's achievement: "This Slavic film is as astonishing as the first ballets of Diaghilev."

Other commentators also highlighted the film's unfamiliar form and unusual blending of genres, with one of them making comparison with D. W. Griffith's recently released comic mystery drama, One Exciting Night, as well as finding other reference points in The Cabinet of Dr. Caligari and in Cubism; the result was a psychological fantasy of a kind not previously seen.

Writing in 1938, Jean Renoir recalled his encounter with the film as a life-changing experience: "One day at the Coliseum cinema, I saw Le Brasier ardent directed by Mosjoukine, and produced by the courageous Alexandre Kamenka, of Films Albatros. The audience was yelling and whistling, shocked by this film that was so different from their usual fodder. I was thrilled. At last I had before my eyes a good film in France. Admittedly it was made by Russians, but in Montreuil, in a French atmosphere, in our conditions; the film was released in a good theatre, not successfully, but it was released. I decided to abandon my profession, which was ceramics, and to set about making films."

After its exclusive run, Le Brasier ardent was generally released in France on 2 November 1923. However it proved to be a serious commercial failure, and it marked the end of Mosjoukine's short career as a director.

== Home media ==
A restored copy of Le Brasier ardent, tinted and toned, and based on the original negative at the Cinémathèque française, was included in a DVD set of Films Albatros productions issued by Flicker Alley in 2013 under the title "French masterworks: Russian emigrés in Paris 1923-1929".

Reviewers of this set showed a similar mixture of responses to the film as its original audiences. One described it as "one of the 1920s' most unfettered explosions of heedless style", and continued: "Mosjoukine tricks out the proceedings with editing hijinks, arch perpectival designs and camera tricks you could swear he stole from Murnau, Eisenstein, Epstein, Kuleshov and Leni, if in fact their imitable films didn't all follow several years after."

Another found more modern points of comparison for the film's visual extravagance: "The movie opens with a burst of wild imagery ...in which Mosjoukine appears in roles as widely varied as a martyr burning at the stake and a silk-hatted roué visiting the sort of underground cabaret-brothel-opium-den that David Lynch would be conjuring 70 years later. (More Lynchian than Lynch, Mosjoukine's nightclub comes equipped with a curtain that burns from the bottom up as it is being raised)." He also found greater coherence in its structure: "But for most of its running time, Le Brasier ardent seems to be following a similarly oneiric, free-associative structure, as the husband finds himself hiring Z (a partner in an exclusive, clandestine detective agency, where the operatives are psychologists as well as investigators) in a misguided attempt to recapture his wife's affections. It's all the more impressive, then, when the film finally reveals itself to have been following the sequence of events laid out in the dream sequence all along."
