= The Lion of the Moguls =

1924 film directed by Jean Epstein

Le Lion des Mogols
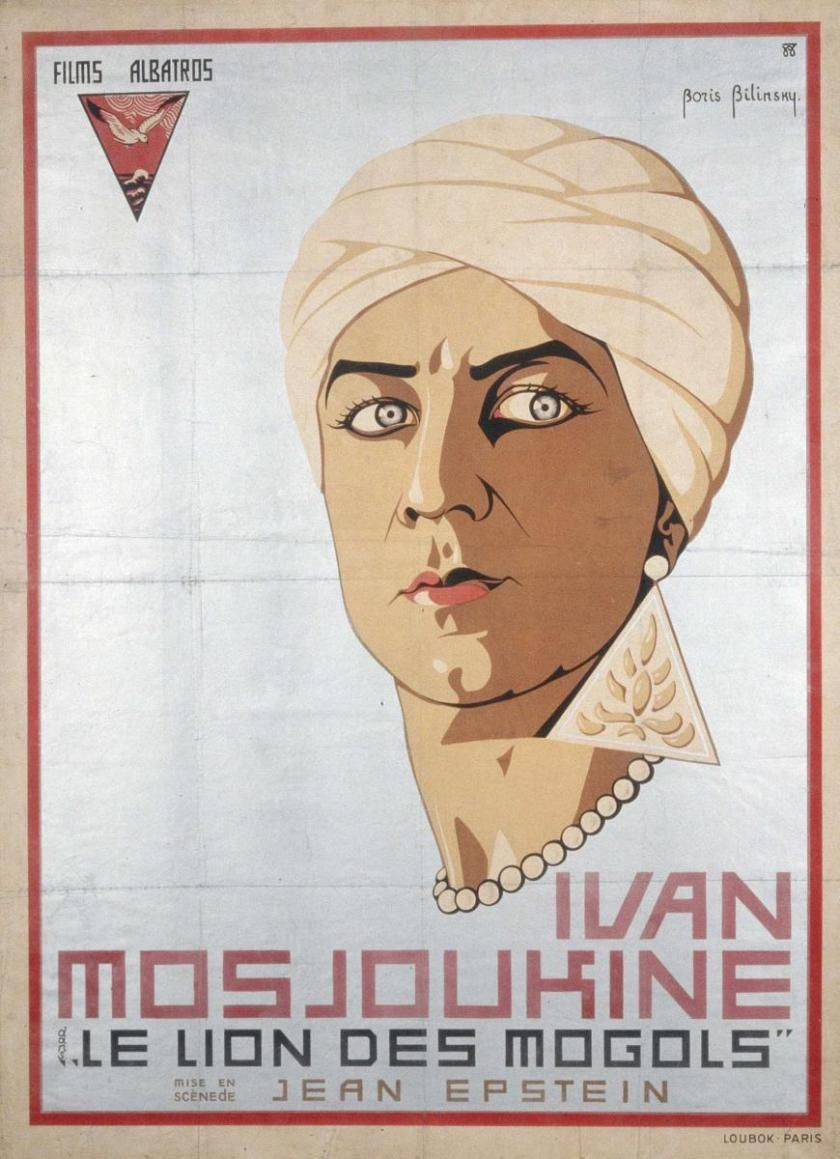
- Directed by: Jean Epstein
- Written by: Jean Epstein; Ivan Mozzhukhin
- Produced by: Alexandre Kamenka
- Starring: Ivan Mozzhukhin; Nathalie Lissenko; Camille Bardou
- Cinematography: Fédote Bourgasoff; Joseph-Louis Mundwiller
- Production company: Films Albatros
- Release date: 24 December 1924
- Running time: 102 minutes (on DVD 2013)
- Country: France
- Languages: Silent film French intertitles

The Lion of the Moguls (1924) by Jean Epstein

Le Lion des Mogols (The Lion of the Moguls) is a 1924 French drama film directed by Jean Epstein. It is the first film that he directed for the Films Albatros production company.

== Plot ==
In a sacred city of Tibet, the cruel Grand Khan, who has been usurping power for 15 years, orders that Zemgali, a young woman loved by Prince Roundhito-Sing, be taken to his palace. The Prince frees her but she is recaptured and he must flee the country.

On the boat which takes him to France, he falls in love with film star Anna and she convinces him to become an actor and play with her in a film. In Paris, the Prince is cast opposite Anna in a film about his own story. Anna's lover Morel, a banker who produces the film, is becoming more and more jealous and takes advantage of the Prince's naivety to make him sign a bad check for a large sum of money. To disarm Morel's jealousy Anna tells him she does not love the Prince, who is devastated when he overhears their conversation.

The Prince goes to a dance where he gets drunk and at dawn asks a taxi driver to drive through Paris as fast as possible. The following day, Anna and the Prince go back to his hotel after shooting a scene where they kiss each other. Mad with jealously, Morel calls the police and makes a complaint about the bad check made by the Prince. After looking for him at the studio, the police go to the hotel. Meanwhile, four countrymen of the Prince have arrived in Paris and are looking for him. They also end up at the hotel, where a big masked ball is going on.

Morel threatens the Prince with a gun but one of the Prince's countrymen kills him, saving the Prince, who is wounded. Anna and the Prince put on masks and hide among the dancers of the masked ball. Anna reveals to the Prince that she is his sister and how she had managed to flee when the usurper had killed the King, their father. The police tell the dancers that a criminal is hiding among them and request that they take off their masks. The Prince is identified but before the police can arrest him, one of his compatriots announce that he has come to Paris to announce that the Prince has become the new sovereign of his country following the usurper's death. A few months later, the Prince goes back to his country, where he solemnly marries Zemgali.

== Cast ==
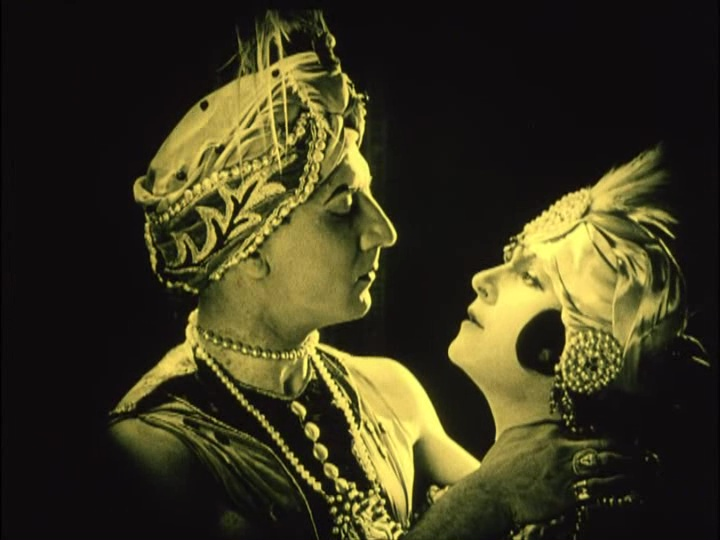
I. Mozzhukhin and N. Lissenko

- Ivan Mozzhukhin as Prince Roundghito-Sing (as Ivan Mosjoukine)
- Nathalie Lissenko as Anna
- Camille Bardou as Morel
- Alexiane as Zemgali
- François Viguier as The Grand Khan

== Production and reception ==
Jean Epstein had already established himself as an innovative film theorist and director with the publication of several books and the direction of several films, notably L'Auberge rouge and Cœur fidèle, when he was introduced to Russian exile Alexandre Kamenka, the co-founder of Films Albatros. He signed on to direct a film based on an idea by Ivan Mozzhukhin, the star of the studio. This would give him access to the important means of the Russian Cinema School of Paris but would oblige him to make a more commercial film than what he had done until then. Epstein solved the challenge by giving different styles to the different parts of the film. The exotic scenes are filmed in a rather conventional way, with the lavish sets and costumes characteristic of the Albatros productions. Conversely, for the Parisian scenes, he used his personal style with close-ups, fast editing and camera movements.

Most of the film was shot at the Albatros studios in Montreuil with on-location shots in Paris and on a boat in Marseille.

The film was a success both at the box office and with critics. La Cinématographie Française characterised it as "a strange and fantastical adventure in which the middle part is taking place in a chimerical Asia, allowing artists such as Epstein for cutting and lighting, Lochakoff for the sets, Mozzhukhin for the interpretation and Bilinsky for the costumes, to indulge in wonderful extravagances." Georges Sadoul on the other hand found the film "romantic and violent" and more a film by Ivan Mozzhukhin than by Jean Epstein.

== Restoration ==
The film was reconstructed in 1966 by Marie Epstein on the basis of the original camera negative acquired by the Cinémathèque Française in 1958 and lost since. In 2008 the Cinetaca de la Universidad de Chile located a period tinted copy which made it possible to reconstitute a print close to the original colours. The restoration for the production of the 2014 DVD were realised by the Laboratory of the Cinemateca Portuguesa, thanks to a grant from the Franco-American Cultural Fund.
