= The Porter from Maxim's =

The Porter from Maxim's (French: Le chasseur de chez Maxim's) may refer to:

- The Porter from Maxim's (play), a 1923 play by the French writers Yves Mirande and Gustave Quinson
- The Porter from Maxim's (1927 film), a French silent film directed by Roger Lion
- The Porter from Maxim's (1933 film), a French film directed by Karl Anton
- The Porter from Maxim's (1939 film), a French film directed by Maurice Cammage
- The Porter from Maxim's (1953 film), a French film directed by Henri Diamant-Berger
- The Porter from Maxim's (1976 film), a French film directed by Claude Vital
