= Paris in Five Days =

1926 French film

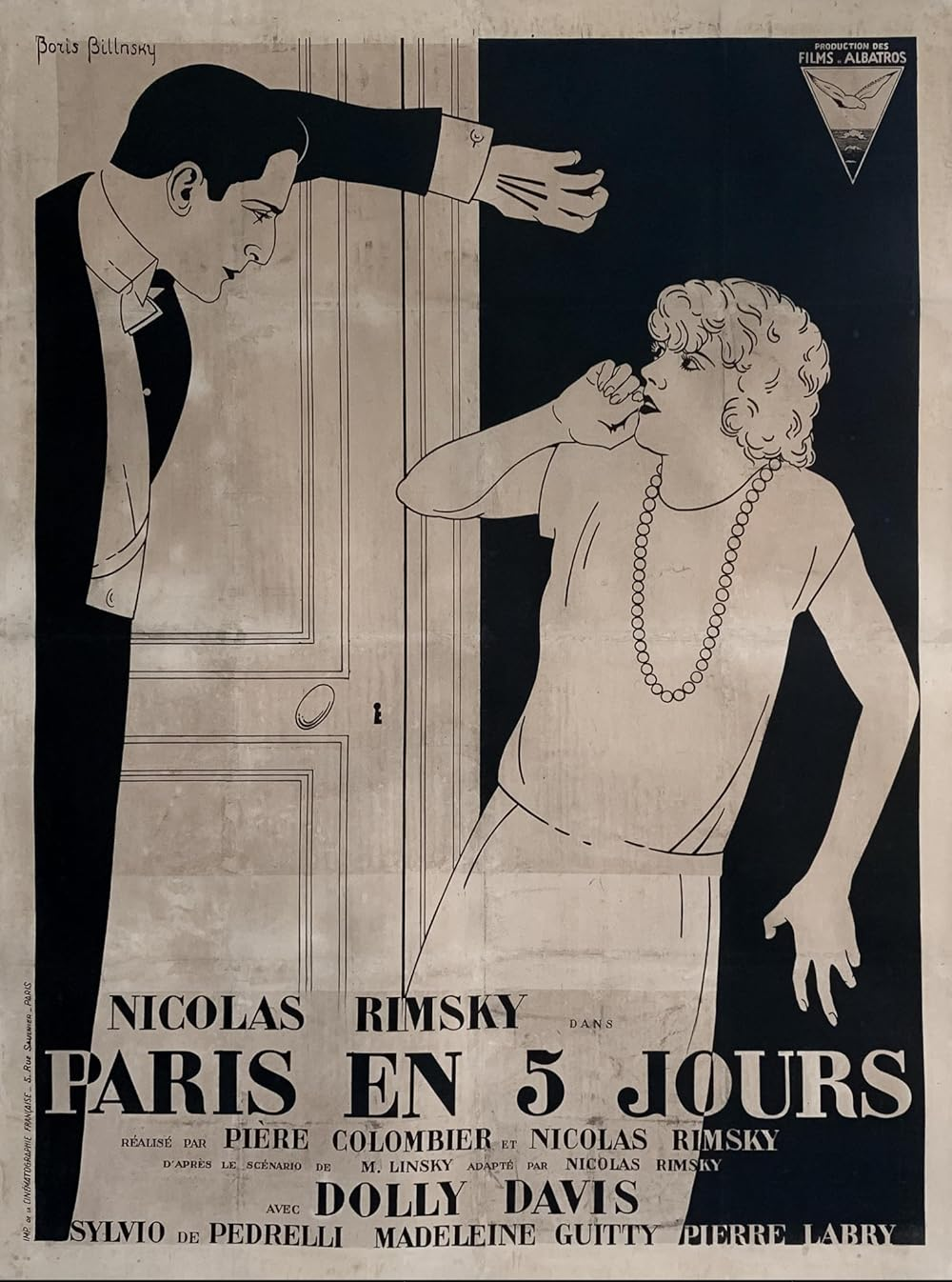
- Directed by: Pierre Colombier; Nicolas Rimsky
- Written by: Michel Linsky; Raoul Ploquin; Nicolas Rimsky
- Produced by: Alexandre Kamenka
- Starring: Nicolas Rimsky; Dolly Davis; Madeleine Guitty
- Cinematography: Gaston Chelle; Paul Guichard; Nikolas Roudakoff
- Production company: Films Albatros
- Distributed by: Les Films Armor
- Release date: 9 November 1926
- Running time: 75 minutes
- Country: France
- Languages: Silent; French intertitles

Paris in Five Days (French: Paris en cinq jours) is a 1926 French silent comedy film directed by Pierre Colombier and Nicolas Rimsky and starring Rimsky, Dolly Davis and Madeleine Guitty. The film's sets were designed by the art director Lazare Meerson.

== Synopsis ==
Paris in Five Days (1926)

American accountant Harry meets Dolly after he rescues her, and the two become engaged. When he makes a fortune from his stock market investment he takes his fiancée for a five-day trip to see Paris, where they enjoy a series of adventures.

== Cast ==
- Nicolas Rimsky as Harry Mascaret
- Dolly Davis as Dolly - la fiancée d'Harry
- Sylvio De Pedrelli as Le comte Costa de Corvinatza / Pablo Kornovadso
- Madeleine Guitty as Grace Pumpkin - La capitaine de l'Armée du Salut
- Pierre Labry as Jerry Bennett
- Irma Gray as Mrs. Bennett
- Max Lerel as Lloyd Bennett
- Valeska Rimsky as Mistress Cool
- Léon Courtois as Ted Broadcast - Le guide
- Louis Monfils as Le commissaire
- Hubert Daix as L'Américain à Opéra

== Bibliography ==
- Rège, Philippe. Encyclopedia of French Film Directors, Volume 1. Scarecrow Press, 2009.
