= Julien Sorel =

- Le Rouge et le Noir character
- Created by: Stendhal
- Portrayed by: Gérard Philipe (1954) Robert Etcheverry (1961); Ewan McGregor (1993) Kim Rossi Stuart (1997)

In-universe information
- Gender: Male
- Title: Monsieur le Chevalier Julien Sorel de la Vernaye
- Occupation: Preceptor, secretary
- Family: father, brothers

Julien Sorel is the protagonist of The Red and the Black by Stendhal, published in 1830. Originally, the novel was meant to be eponymous.

== Biography ==
An intelligent, handsome, and ambitious young man, he was born in Verrières, a small imaginary town in Doubs, though not based on any real geographical location. The son of a carpenter, he was despised by his father and his brothers for his weakness ("his puny physique, ill adapted as it was to manual labour") and his bookish nature. He was a passionate admirer of Napoleon Bonaparte. The local bishop, Bishop Chélan, taught him Latin, allowing him to become a preceptor for the children of the mayor of Verrières, M de Rênal.

He plans his social ascension through two different means. He was a servant, like Jean-Jacques Rousseau from the Confessions, and an aspiring clerk. He dreams of integrating high society by the Red of the military uniform or the Black of the clergy.

Though the red refers to another aspiration: that of love and seduction, also similar to the young Jean-Jacques Rousseau and his tryst with the older Mme de Warens. Julien refuses the servant girl's advances and instead focuses on the conquest of the soft and fragile Mme de Rênal. His affair with her leads him to success, though Stendhal never delves into what exactly his feelings for Mme de Rênal are, whereas her affections are quite clear. That said, one of the scenes at the start of the novel clearly shows the young man's psychology, when Julien grabs Mme de Rênal's hand at night. This seduction scene is described, in Stendhal's ironic style, as a fight scene: "Au moment précis où dix heures sonneront, j'exécuterai ce que, pendant toute la journée, je me suis promis de faire ce soir, ou je monterai chez moi me brûler la cervelle". Julien, an admirer of Napoleon, believes no decision should be made without a combative mindset. His pride is explained by the fact he has warrior ideals, transparent in this scene: the rest of the novel stems from his choice.

Because of social morality, he is forced to quit Verrières and a destroyed Mme de Rênal. He has no great qualms about leaving. He stops at the Besançon seminary and discovers the power struggles of the clergy. He then sets off for Paris and builds himself a prosperous future as secretary of the Marquess de la Mole. His intelligence and his prodigious memory lead him to great success, both in the artistic circles of Paris and in diplomatic missions in foreign parts. But slowly, he becomes enamoured with the arrogant daughter of the Marquess, Mathilde de la Mole, who is also infatuated with Julien. For the latter, Mathilde is desirable since others desire her. Her social rank pushes him to accept their affair. But Mathilde falls pregnant, and to avoid any dishonour, the marquess gives Julien a great sum of money, ennobles him as Julien Sorel de la Vernaye and makes him a lieutenant of the Hussards. But Julien abandons his new life when he attempts to murder Mme de Rênal in the church at Verrières, since she exposed Julien's immorality to the marquess as her confessor advised her to.

Mme de Rênal visits Julien in the Besançon prison. Their meeting revives the passion they shared for one other, to Mathilde's dismay. Julien makes it his goal to denounce the justice system as classist and his judges as biased. He adopts the role of a revolutionary, condemned for his social audacity, and not for attempted murder. He refuses to beg for mercy and is killed in a dignified manner. In the last moments of his life, he defines his death as a consequence of his fight, as if he was in control of his life until the very end. Mathilde, like her ancestor, makes Julien's severed head the center of a romantic cult. Mme de Rênal dies three days later.

== Description ==
At the beginning of the novel, Julien is described this way:

He was a young man of eighteen to nineteen years old, and of puny appearance, with irregular but delicate features, and an aquiline nose. The big black eyes which betokened in their tranquil moments a temperament at once fiery and reflective were at the present moment animated by an expression of the most ferocious hate. Dark chestnut hair, which came low down over his brow, made his forehead appear small and gave him a sinister look during his angry moods. It is doubtful if any face out of all the innumerable varieties of the human physiognomy was ever distinguished by a more arresting individuality. A supple well-knit figure, indicated agility rather than strength. His air of extreme pensiveness and his great pallor had given his father the idea that he would not live, or that if he did, it would only be to be a burden to his family. The butt of the whole house, he hated his brothers and his father. He was regularly beaten in the Sunday sports in the public square.

== The inspirations behind the character ==
=== Antoine Berthet ===
The most obvious inspiration is Antoine Berthet, the real-life perpetrator of a scandalous crime. Berthet a man from lowly origins, nevertheless achieved a considerable degree of learning and was employed as a tutor by the Michoud family. It is not known whether Berthet had a sexual relationship with Madam Michoud or not (at his trial he denied it), but he certainly appears to have had a very close emotional relationship with her. At some point Berthet left the Michoud family and was employed as a tutor by the Aristocratic Cordon family, and again became emotionally embroiled, this time with the Cordon daughter. After having been dismissed by the Cordons, and for reasons that were not entirely clear, Berthet vowed to kill Mm. Michoud, and in June 1826 he entered the church in which she was worshipping and shot her. He also attempted to kill himself. Both attempts failed, but he was nevertheless executed by guillotine at Grenoble in February, 1828, aged 25 years. The life of Stendhal's Julien Sorel mirrors events in the life of Antoine Berthet to a remarkable degree. A small collection of dossiers on 'L'affaire Berthet' (including some newspaper accounts of the trial and the execution), are appended to the 1997 Livre de Poche edition of Le Rouge at le Noir. Stendhal, (1997) Le Rouge et le Noir. Chronique de 1830. Preface, commentaries and notes by Michel Crouzet. Paris. Le Livre de Poche.

=== Jenrel ===
Julien Sorel himself links his name to that of Louis Jenrel, a criminal whose extract in his journal talks of execution, seeing in it his inevitable, predestined tragic fate. The link is strengthened by the fact Louis Jenrel and Julien Sorel are exact anagrams.

== Portrayals ==
Julien Sorel has been interpreted by :

- by Ivan Mosjoukine in the film by Gennaro Righelli released in 1927;
- by Gérard Philipe in the film by Claude Autant-Lara released in 1954;
- by Robert Etcheverry in the TV film by Pierre Cardinal, 1961, alongside Micheline Presle, Marie Laforêt, Jean-Roger Caussimon;
- by Nikolaï Eremenko in The Red and the Black by Sergueï Guerassimov released in 1976;
- by Ewan McGregor in the BBC's TV film by Ben Bolt, 1993, with Rachel Weisz and Alice Krige;
- then by Kim Rossi Stuart in the TV film by Jean-Daniel Verhaeghe released on the channel TF1 in 1997, with Carole Bouquet, Judith Godrèche, Claude Rich, etc.
- Julien Sorel will also be portrayed by Côme (finalist of The Voice (France) 2015) in the musical Le Rouge et Le Noir, l'Opéra Rock.
- The Japanese Takarazuka Revue Theatre adapted The Red and the Black into a musical several times: 2020 the latest, when Julien Sorel was portrayed by the current top star of Moon Troupe, Tamaki Ryou
