= Children's Souls Accuse You =

1927 film

- Directed by: Curtis Bernhardt
- Written by: Paul Keller; Henry Koster; Luitpold Nusser
- Starring: Albert Steinrück; Nathalie Lissenko; Walter Rilla
- Cinematography: Willy Goldberger
- Music by: Hans May
- Production company: Leo-Film
- Release date: 24 March 1927
- Country: Germany
- Languages: Silent; German intertitles

Children's Souls Accuse You (German: Kinderseelen klagen euch an) is a 1927 German silent drama film directed by Curtis Bernhardt and starring Albert Steinrück, Nathalie Lissenko and Walter Rilla. It was made with an anti-abortion theme. It was shot at the Terra Studios in Berlin. The film's sets were designed by the art director Heinrich Richter.

== Cast ==
- Albert Steinrück as Kommerzienrat Enzenberg
- Nathalie Lissenko as Luise Enzenberg
- Walter Rilla
- Claire Rommer as Annemarie Trebisch
- Fritz Rasp as Heinrich Voss – Enzenbergs Sekretär
- Harry Hardt as Buchhalter Banthler
- Carla Bartheel as Hilda – Heinrichs Schwester
- Bruno Ziener as Josef – Diener
- Evi Moog as Die kleine Helmuth

== Bibliography ==
- Bergfelder, Tim; Bock, Hans-Michael (2009). The Concise Cinegraph: Encyclopaedia of German Cinema. Berghahn Books.
