= Father Sergius (1918 film) =

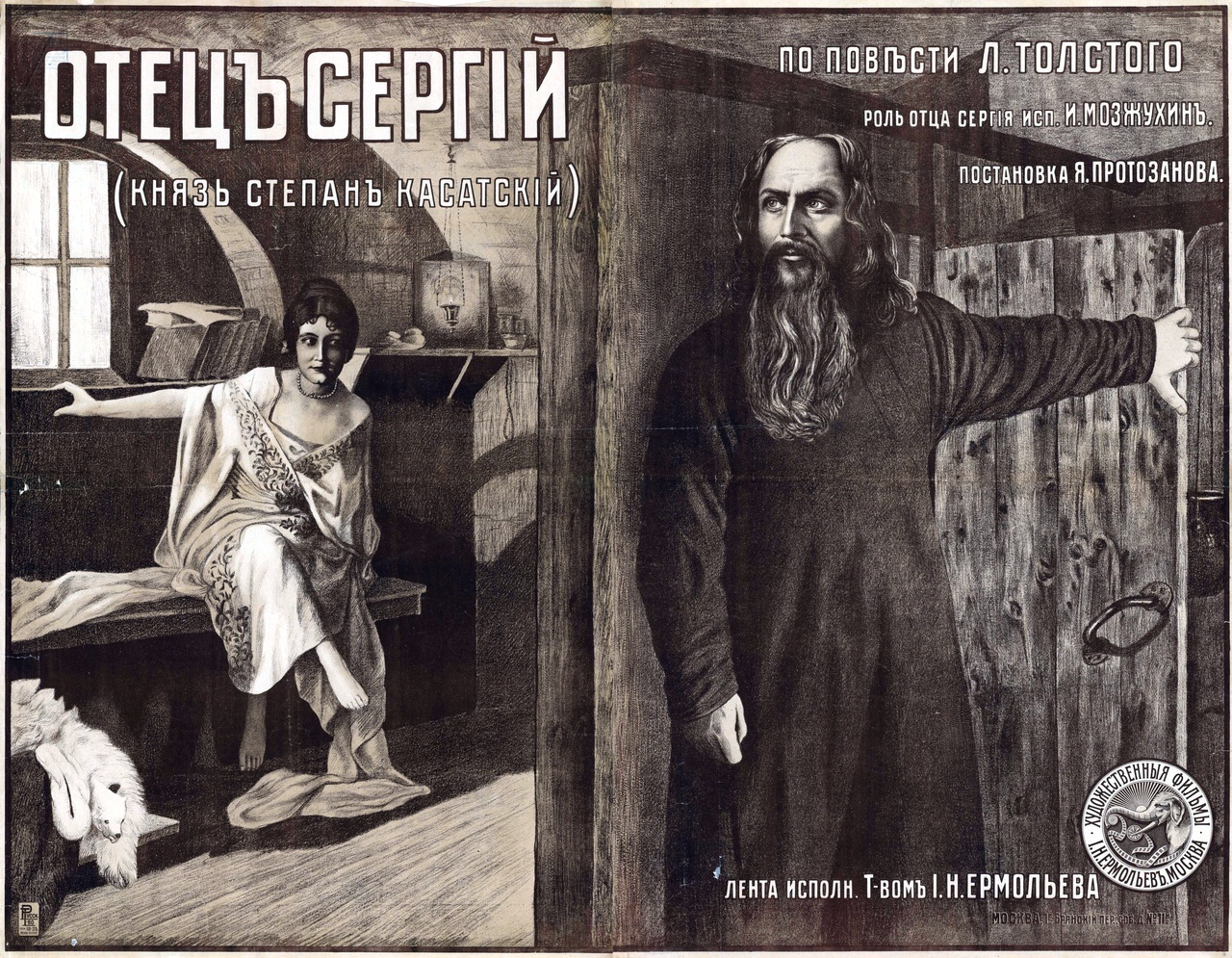
- Directed by: Yakov Protazanov; Alexandre Volkoff
- Written by: Leo Tolstoy (novel); Alexandre Volkoff
- Produced by: Joseph N. Ermolieff
- Starring: Ivan Mosjoukine
- Cinematography: Fédote Bourgasoff; Nikolas Roudakoff
- Music by: Y. Bukke
- Release date: 1918
- Running time: 112 minutes
- Country: Soviet Russia
- Languages: Silent film with Russian intertitles

Father Sergius

Father Sergius (Russian: Отец Сергий, translit. Otets Sergiy) is a 1918 Soviet Russian silent film directed by Yakov Protazanov and Alexandre Volkoff. It is based on the 1911 posthumously published story of the same name by Leo Tolstoy.

This was the first film version of the story, as the depiction of priests was not permitted in the film industry of the Russian Empire until after the October Revolution in 1917. Ivan Mosjoukine plays the title role.

Father Sergius was screened in the United Kingdom in 1920 and 1927.

The film is set during the reign of Russian Tsar Nicholas I, where Prince Kasatsky discovers that his fiancée has an affair with the Tsar. He decides to break his engagement and retires to a convent where he tries to reach holiness.

== Plot ==
The story follows the tumultuous life of Prince Kasatsky, a young aristocrat from a prestigious family in 19th-century Tsarist Russia. Devoted to Tsar Nicholas I and in love with the beautiful Maria Korotkova, Kasatsky is unaware that she is also the mistress of the Tsar. This ill-fated romance leads to his downfall: he loses his military rank, resigns as a Guards officer, and retreats to a monastery to become a priest, adopting the name Father Sergius. However, inner turmoil continues to plague him, as he struggles to reconcile his spiritual aspirations with the worldly influences he perceives around him. Eventually, he leaves the monastery and withdraws to a remote hermitage, embracing an ascetic existence.

Six years later, a lively group of travelers crosses paths with him, including the worldly and pleasure-seeking Makovkina. Intrigued by Sergius's austere lifestyle, she sets out to seduce him by pretending to be a helpless, freezing woman in need of shelter. Sergius perceives her as a temptation sent by the devil. Overcome by the struggle against carnal desire, he takes a drastic step and cuts off one of his fingers in a fit of defiance. Shocked by his extreme act, Makovkina realizes the gravity of her actions and asks for his forgiveness.

A year later, transformed by the encounter, Makovkina has entered a convent. Meanwhile, Kasatsky, now Father Sergius, gains a reputation for holiness among the local peasants, who revere him as a saint, even as idlers mock his piety. Despite this newfound respect, he remains restless. His past catches up with him when he is pursued by the authorities and eventually captured. Sergius is exiled to Siberia, still a tormented soul searching for inner peace.

== Reception ==
A review in The Bioscope, from the time of the film's screening in the United Kingdom in 1920, was critical of the technical qualities of the film, but commented on Moskoujine's "remarkable emotional acting", stating that the film's "emotional power and sincerity will be recognised by every spectator".

== Cast ==
- Ivan Mosjoukine as Prince Kasatsky, later Father Sergius
- Olga Kondorova as Countess Korotkova
- V. Dzheneyeva as Maria - her daughter
- Vladimir Gajdarov as Tsar Nicholas I
- Nikolai Panov as Kasatsky's father
- Natalya Lisenko as Widow of the merchant Makovkin
- Iona Talanov as Merchant
- Vera Orlova as Merchant's daughter
- Pyotr Baksheyev
- Polikarp Pavlov
- Nicolas Rimsky
