= Kean (1924 film) =

1924 film

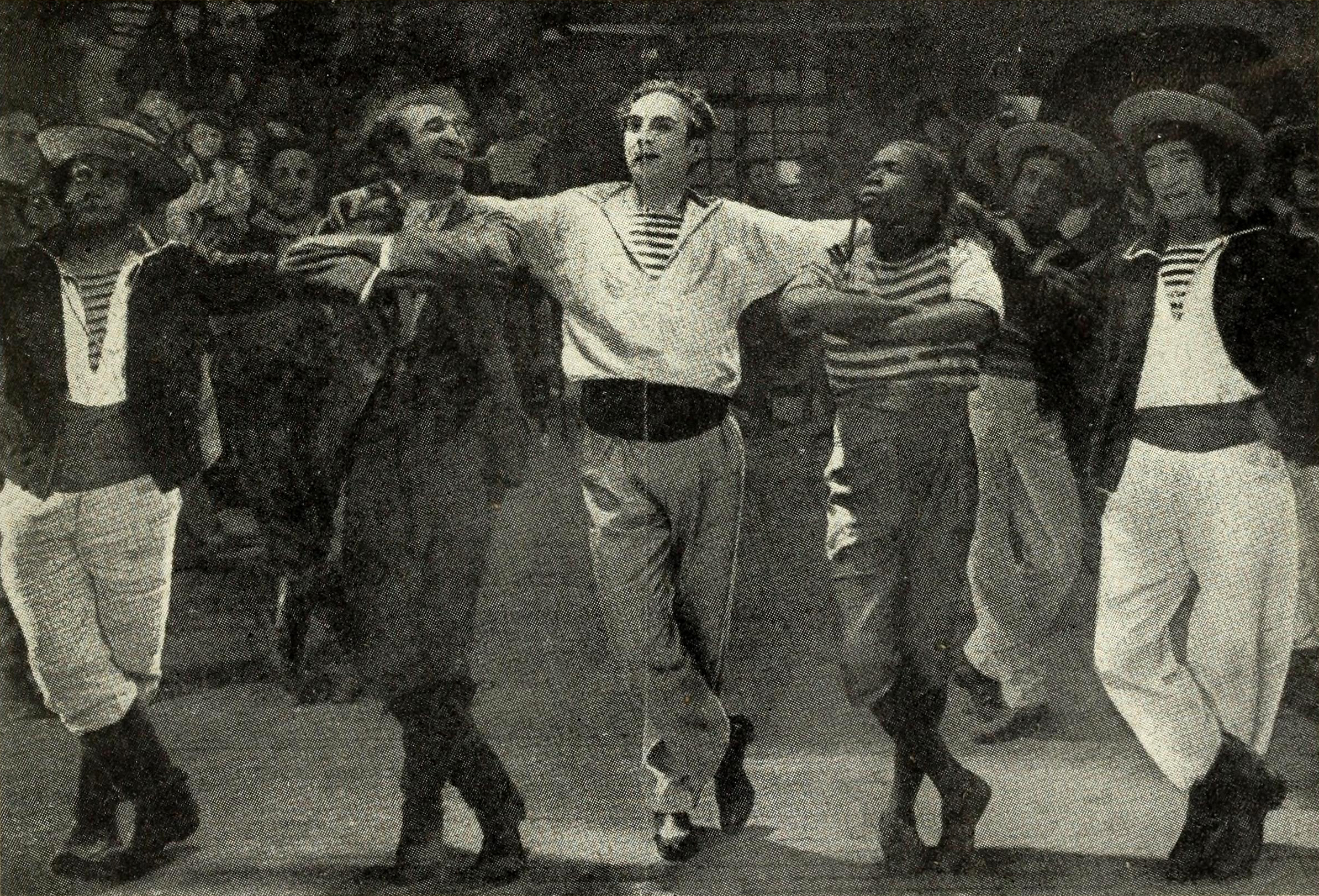
- Directed by: Alexandre Volkoff
- Written by: Kenelm Foss; Alexandre Mozzhukhin; Alexandre Volkoff
- Based on: play Kean by Alexandre Dumas, père
- Produced by: Alexandre Kamenka
- Starring: Ivan Mosjoukine; Nathalie Lissenko
- Production company: Films Albatros
- Distributed by: Compagnie Vitagraph de France (France); Sequana Films (worldwide)
- Release date: 15 February 1924
- Running time: 136 minutes
- Country: France
- Language: Silent

Kean (1924)

Kean, ou Désordre et génie (also known as Edmund Kean: Prince Among Lovers) is a 1924 French drama film directed by Alexandre Volkoff, and starring Ivan Mosjoukine as the actor Edmund Kean. It is an adaptation of the 1836 play Kean by Alexandre Dumas.

== Cast ==
- Ivan Mosjoukine as Edmund Kean
- Nathalie Lissenko as La comtesse Elena de Koefeld
- Nicolas Koline as Solomon
- Otto Detlefsen as Prince of Wales
- Mary Odette as Anna Damby
- Kenelm Foss as Lord Mewill
- Pauline Po as Ophélie / Juliette
