= The House of Mystery (1923 film) =

1923 film

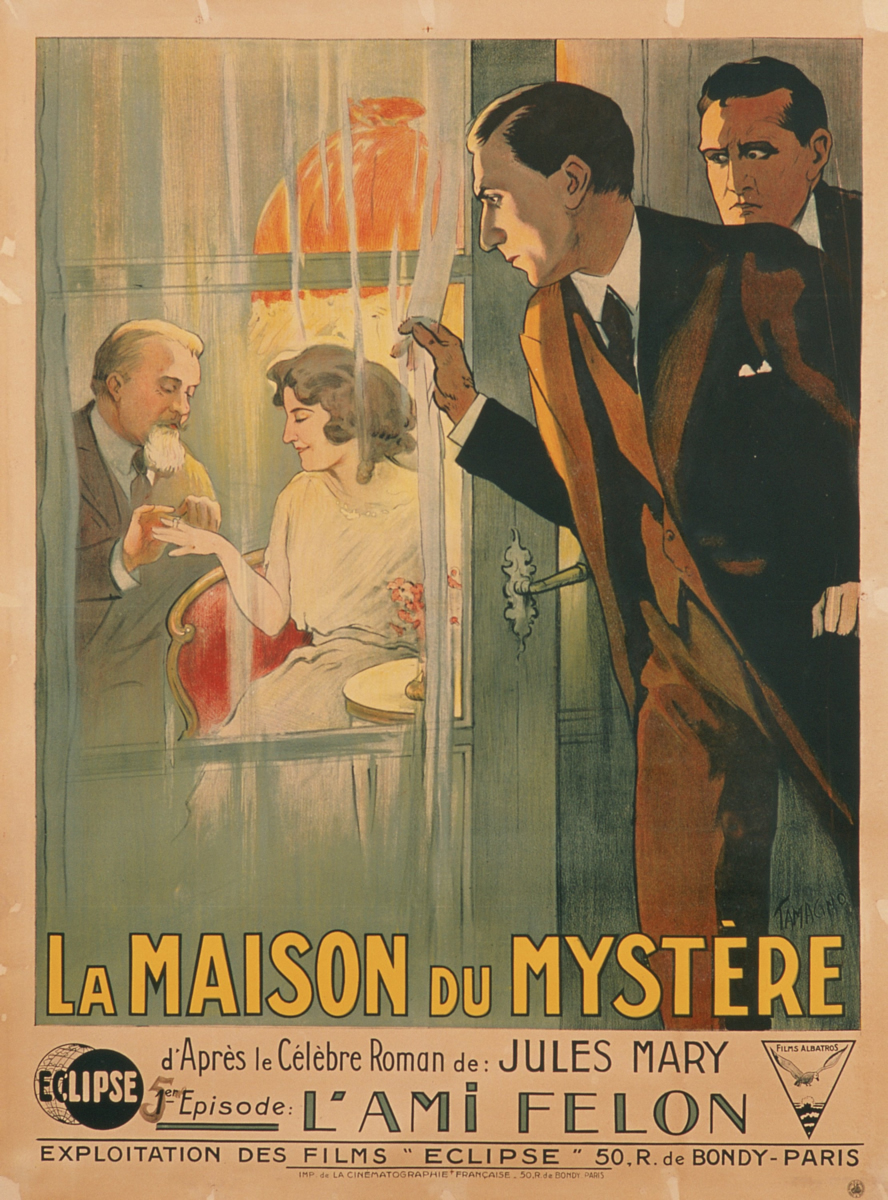
- Poster for first episode
- Original title: La Maison du mystère
- Directed by: Alexandre Volkoff
- Written by: Ivan Mosjoukine; Alexandre Volkoff
- Based on: a novel by Jules Mary
- Starring: Ivan Mosjoukine; Charles Vanel; Nicolas Koline; Hélène Darly
- Cinematography: Nikolai Toporkoff; Joseph-Louis Mundwiller; Fédote Bourgasoff
- Production companies: Ermolieff-Cinéma; Films Albatros
- Release date: 1923
- Running time: 381 minutes
- Country: France
- Languages: Silent; French intertitles

La Maison du mystère (English: The House of Mystery) is a French silent serial film directed by Alexandre Volkoff for the Albatros film company. It was made during 1921 and 1922 and was first shown in 1923. It was co-written by and starred Ivan Mosjoukine.

== Plot ==
Julien Villandrit is the owner of the estate of Les Basses-Bruyères and its textile factory, where the manager is his childhood friend Corradin. Julien marries his neighbour Régine, unaware that Corradin also loves her. Julien is sent to gaol for a murder actually committed by Corradin. The only witness to the truth is the woodsman Rudeberg and Corradin buys his silence by paying for the education of his son Pascal. Julien's struggle to clear his name and to rescue Régine and their daughter Christiane from Corradin's scheming extends over many years and faces many setbacks.

Episode 1

Episode 2

Episode 3

Episode 4

Episode 5

Episode 6

Episode 7

Episode 8

Episode 9

Episode 10

== Cast ==
- Ivan Mosjoukine as Julien Villandrit
- Charles Vanel as Henri Corradin
- Hélène Darly as Régine de Bettigny
- Francine Mussey as Christiane, daughter of Julien and Régine
- Nicolas Koline as Rudeberg
- Wladimir Strijiewsky as Pascal, son of Rudeberg
- Bartkevitch as Marjory
- Sylvia Gray as Marjorie
- Claude Benedict as Général de Bettigny
- Nina Raievska as Mme de Bettigny
- Gilbert Dacheux as Urbain
- Simone Genevois as young Christiane
- Fabien Haziza as young Pascal

== Production ==
In 1921 the Russian émigré producer Joseph N. Ermolieff undertook three film serials through his company Ermolieff-Cinéma, including one based on La Maison du mystère by the novelist Jules Mary. Filming began in the summer of 1921 but was then interrupted for six months when its star, Ivan Mosjoukine, contracted typhoid fever. When production resumed in 1922, it was under the aegis of Films Albatros, the successor to Ermolieff's company. The first episode was released in France on 23 March 1923 with its remaining nine episodes appearing at weekly intervals.

The titles of the ten parts of the serial were: Episode 1: L'Ami félon. Episode 2: Le Secret de l'étang. Episode 3: L'Ambition au service de la haine. Episode 4: L'Implacable Verdict. Episode 5: Le Pont vivant. Episode 6: La Voix du sang. Episode 7: Les Caprices du destin. Episode 8: Champ clos. Episode 9: Les Angoisses de Corradin. Episode 10: Le Triomphe de l'amour.

Studio scenes were filmed in Montreuil and some location shooting was carried out in Nice and Cannes. A number of the cast and the technicians were Russians who had moved to France after the Russian Revolution. The story allowed Ivan Mosjoukine to appear in numerous disguises in the course of the film and to display the range of his acting.

== Reception ==
The response to the serial's release was positive: "Its success was immediate and phenomenal. Critics who had previously denounced the serial as artless, lowbrow fare were almost fulsome in their praise of the film's stylish upgrading of melodramatic clichés, sheer pictorial elegance, and narrative imagination, not to mention the utter credibility of the performances. For Mosjoukine it was the ultimate consecration after four succès d'estime, and once again served as a showcase for his multifarious talent. But the film also opened doors for Charles Vanel ... and the astonishing Nicolas Koline..."

One critic in 1923 admitted that his longstanding disdain for the serial film had been overturned by this example of the form: "It is no longer a case of a film made of preposterous situations, of astonishing escapades, of heroines ten times slain and ten times resurrected, but, on the contrary, of a very lucid adaptation of Jules Mary's novel. A grasp of rhythm, of weight, of truth, and beautiful photography full of clever discoveries are the mark of M. Volkoff's direction...."

The film was re-released as a feature film in 1929 (with a running time of 159 minutes).

It was remade as a sound feature film with the same title directed by Gaston Roudès in 1933.

== Restoration ==
The 1929 feature version of the film was restored in 1985 for the Cinémathèque française by Renée Lichtig, and she completed a restoration of the serial version with tinting in 1992. A 3-disk DVD edition of the serial was issued in the USA by Flicker Alley in 2015.
