= Secrets of the Orient =

1928 film

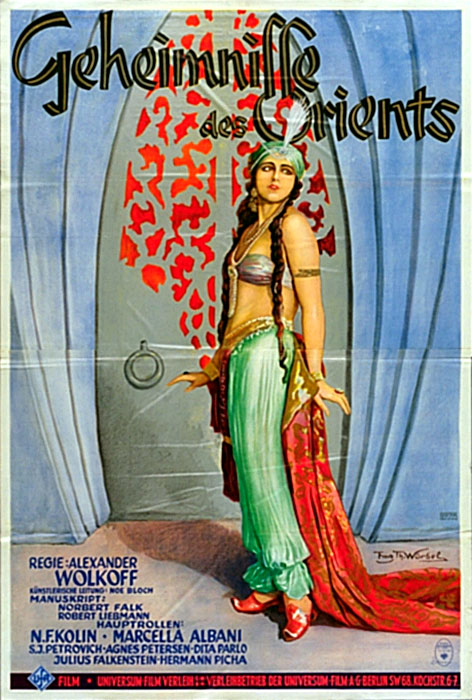
- Directed by: Alexandre Volkoff
- Written by: Norbert Falk; Robert Liebmann; Alexandre Volkoff
- Produced by: Noë Bloch; Gregor Rabinovitch
- Starring: Nikolas Kolin; Iván Petrovich; Dimitri Dimitriev; Gaston Modot
- Cinematography: Fédote Bourgasoff; Curt Courant; Nikolai Toporkoff
- Music by: Willy Schmidt-Gentner
- Production companies: UFA; Ciné-Alliance
- Distributed by: UFA (Germany)
- Release date: 19 October 1928
- Running time: 103 minutes
- Countries: Germany; France
- Languages: Silent Version; German Intertitles Sound (Synchronzied) English Intertitles

Secrets of the Orient (German: Geheimnisse des Orients) is a 1928 German-French silent drama film directed by Alexandre Volkoff and starring Nikolas Kolin, Iván Petrovich and Dimitri Dimitriev. It was made at the Babelsberg Studios in Berlin while Location shooting took place in Nice and French Tunisia. The film's sets were designed by the art directors Alexandre Lochakoff and Vladimir Meingard. A sound version of the film was prepared by Gaumont for English speaking audiences. While the sound version has no audible dialog, it features a synchronized musical score with sound effects using both the sound-on-disc and sound-on-film process.

== Cast ==
- Nikolas Kolin as Ali, shoemaker in Cairo
- Iván Petrovich as Prince Achmed
- Dimitri Dimitriev as Sultan Schariah
- Gaston Modot as Prince Hussein
- Julius Falkenstein as Astrologer
- Hermann Picha as Sultan's fool
- Aleksandr Vertinsky as Vezir
- Marcella Albani as Sobeide, Sultan's favorite
- Agnes Petersen-Mozzuchinowa as Princess Gylnare, daughter of Sultan
- Nina Koshetz as Fatme, wife of Ali
- Dita Parlo as Slave of the Princess
- Brigitte Helm
- Steffie Vida

== Music ==
The sound version features a theme song entitled “In Old Kashmir” which was composed by Ed Elton.

== Bibliography ==
- Bock, Hans-Michael. Das Ufa-Buch. Zweitausendeins, 1992.
