= Penzensky District =

Penzensky District Пензенский район (Russian)
- District
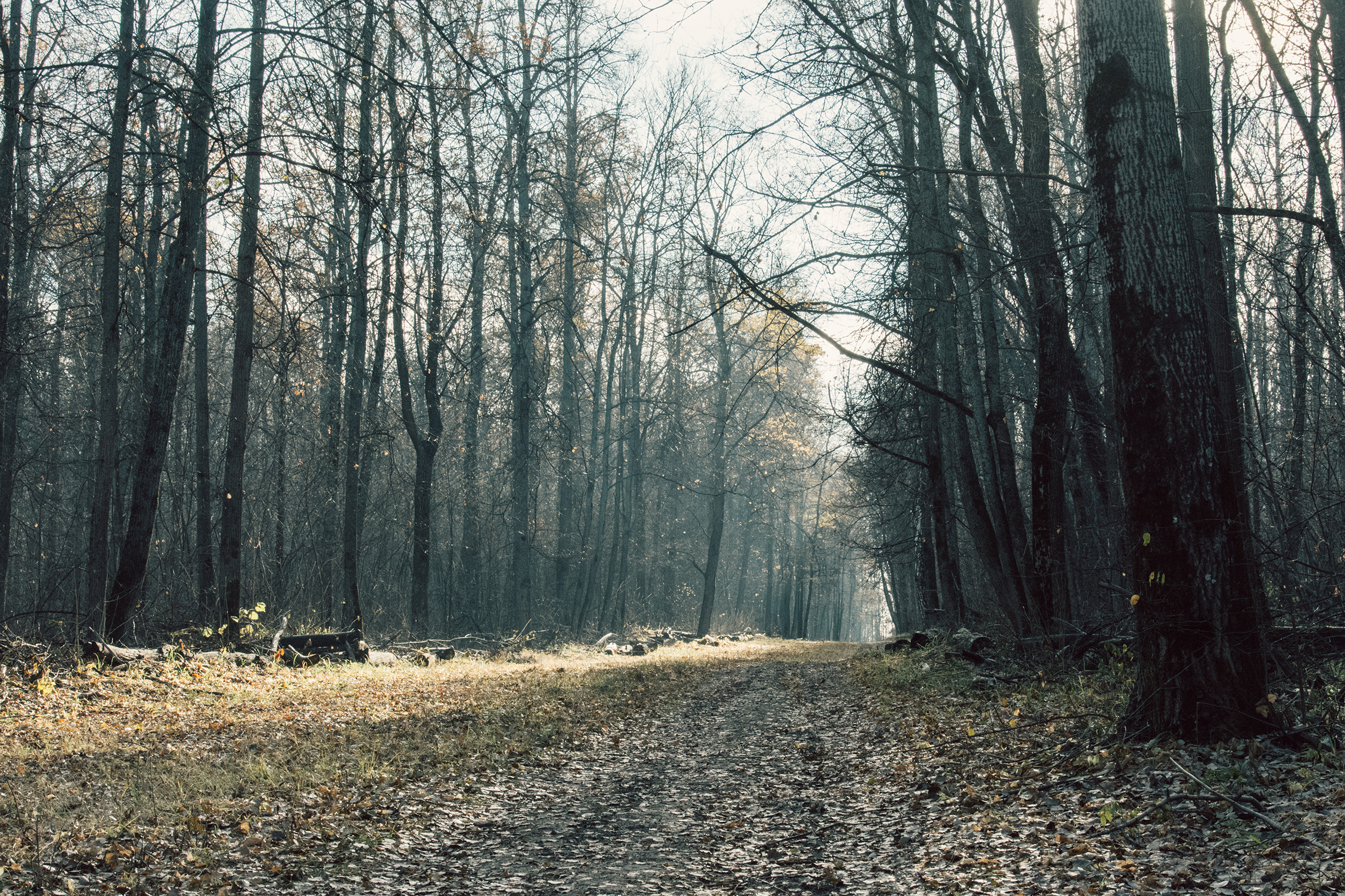
- Arbekovsky Forest, Penzensky District

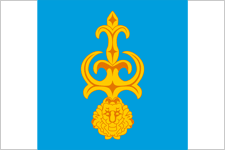
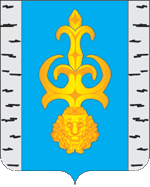
- Flag Coat of arms
- Location of Penzensky District in Penza Oblast
- Coordinates: 52°48′56″N 45°03′05″E
- Country: Russia
- Federal subject: Penza Oblast
- Established: 16 July 1928
- Administrative center: Kondol

Area
  - Total: 2,823.8 km^{2} (1,090.3 sq mi)

Population (2010 Census)
  - Total: 51,308
  - Density: 18.170/km^{2} (47.060/sq mi)
  - Urban: 5.1%
  - Rural: 94.9%

Administrative structure
  - Administrative divisions: 1 Work settlements, 17 Selsoviets
  - Inhabited localities: 1 urban-type settlements, 111 rural localities

Municipal structure
  - Municipally incorporated as: Penzensky Municipal District
  - Municipal divisions: 1 urban settlements, 17 rural settlements
- Time zone: UTC+3 (MSK)
- OKTMO ID: 56655000
- Website: http://rpenz.pnzreg.ru/

Penzensky District (Russian: Пе́нзенский райо́н) is an administrative and municipal district (raion), one of the twenty-seven in Penza Oblast, Russia. It is located in the center of the oblast. The area of the district is 2,823.8 square kilometers (1,090.3 sq mi). Its administrative center is the rural locality (a selo) of Kondol. Population: 51,308 (2010 Census); 41,318 (2002 census); 41,323 (1989 Soviet census). The population of Kondol accounts for 6.5% of the district's total population.

== Notable residents ==
- Vyacheslav Gladkov (born 1969), politician, born in the village of Kuchki
- Ivan Mosjoukine (1889–1939), silent film actor, born in Kondol
