= Nikolai Toporkoff =

Russian Empire-born French cinematographer

- Born: 20 June 1885; Moscow, Russian Empire
- Died: 20 June 1965 (aged 80); Paris, France
- Occupation: Cinematographer
- Years active: 1917-1954 (film)

Nikolai Toporkoff (1885–1965) was a Russian-born French cinematographer. Toporkoff fled his homeland following the 1917 Russian Revolution, moving to France where he shot around seventy films including the 1927 historical The Loves of Casanova.

== Selected filmography ==
- The House of Mystery (1923)
- Le Brasier ardent (1923)
- The Masked Woman (1924)
- Heart of an Actress (1924)
- Prince Charming (1925)
- The Loves of Casanova (1927)
- Secrets of the Orient (1928)
- The Model from Montparnasse (1929)
- The Adjutant of the Czar (1929)
- Troika (1930)
- The White Devil (1930)
- Nights of Princes (1930)
- The Mystery of the Yellow Room (1930)
- La Femme d'une nuit (1931)
- Suzanne (1932)
- Take Care of Amelie (1932)
- Sergeant X (1932)
- 600,000 Francs a Month (1933)
- Let's Touch Wood (1933)
- King of the Camargue (1935)
- The Mascot (1935)
- Rose (1936)
- In the Service of the Tsar (1936)
- The Red Dancer (1937)
- Ramuntcho (1938)
- Vidocq (1939)
- My Aunt the Dictator (1939)
- Camp Thirteen (1940)
- Those of the Sky (1941)
- The White Truck (1943)
- The Ménard Collection (1944)
- The Last Judgment (1945)
- Secret Documents (1945)
- The Eternal Husband (1946)
- Monsieur Grégoire Escapes (1946)
- Third at Heart (1947)
- The Crowned Fish Tavern (1947)
- Du Guesclin (1949)
- The White Squadron (1949)
- Chéri (1950)
- Agnes of Nothing (1950)
- Farewell Mister Grock (1950)
- My Seal and Them (1951)
- My Friend Oscar (1951)
- Alone in the World (1952)
- The Unfrocked One (1954)
- Leguignon the Healer (1954)

== Bibliography ==
- Klossner, Michael. The Europe of 1500-1815 on film and television. McFarland & Co, 2002.
