= Two Timid Souls (1928 film) =

1928 film directed by René Clair

- Directed by: René Clair
- Written by: play by Eugène Labiche
- Screenplay by: René Clair
- Produced by: Alexandre Kamenka
- Cinematography: Robert Batton; Nikolas Roudakoff
- Production companies: Films Albatros; Sequana Films
- Distributed by: Films Albatros
- Release dates: 5 December 1928 (U.S.); 1 March 1929 (France)
- Running time: 72 minutes (19f/s)
- Country: France
- Language: Silent

Two Timid Souls (French: Les Deux Timides) is a 1928 French silent film comedy directed by René Clair, and based on the 1860 play Les Deux Timides by Eugène Labiche. It was made by the Films Albatros production company. The sets were designed by the art director Lazare Meerson.

== Plot ==
A very shy lawyer, Fremissin, is tasked with defending Garadoux, a man charged rightfully with beating his wife. Fremissin gets nervous at the trial, and ends up demanding the harshest possible sentence for Garadoux, making him spend several months in prison. After a few years, Fremissin has fallen in love with a woman (Cecile Thibaudier). Garadoux sees this and tries to seduce her to get back at Fremissin for getting him sent to prison. Garadoux abuses Fremissin's timid nature, in hilarious acts like posing as a bandit and leaving him disturbing notes telling him not to leave home. After various trials, and meeting his shy counterpart in Cecile's father, Fremissin finally gets to Cecile in time to ask for her hand in marriage, and has a big fight with the Thibaudier and Garadoux family. He then defends the Thibaudier family successfully in court.

== Cast ==
- Pierre Batcheff as Fremissin
- Jim Gérald as Garadoux
- Véra Flory as Cecile Thibaudier
- Maurice de Féraudy as Thibaudier
- Françoise Rosay as The aunt
- Madeleine Guitty as The maid
- Yvette Andréyor as Mme. Garadoux
- Léon Larive
- Anna Lefeuvrier
- Louis Pré Fils
- Antoine Stacquet
- Odette Talazac

== Bibliography ==
- Celia McGerr. René Clair. Twayne Publishers, 1980.
