= Pavel Koshetz =

Russian opera singer (1863–1904)

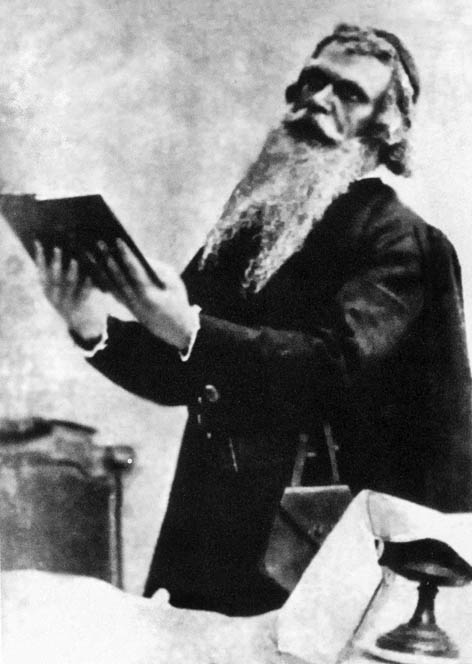
- Born: 14 December 1863
- Died: 2 March 1904 (aged 40)

Pavlo Koshyts (Ukrainian: Павло Олексійович Кошиць; Russian: Павел Алексеевич Кошиц; real last name is Poray-Koshytsi (uk:Порай-Кошиці); 14 December 1863 in Kiev Governorate, Russian Empire – 2 March 1904 in Moscow) was a Russian opera singer (tenor).

== Career ==
Koshetz was born on 14 December 1863 in the village of Kyrylivka (now Shevchenkove in Cherkasy Oblast). He came from an old priestly family.

He studied at the Kiev Theological Academy, then at the Moscow Conservatory (a teacher: Fyodor Petrovich Komissarzhevsky). At the end of 1886 Pavel Koshetz went to study in Milan (Italy). In 1886 - 1889 he sang in opera theatres in Italy, Greece, Catalonia and the Americas. In Italy, he specifically sang at the Nizhny Novgorod chapel of merchant V. Rukavyshnikov. Then he returned to Russia and worked in different cities.

In 1893 Pavel Koshetz was invited at the Bolshoi Theatre. He became a performer for more than 30 operatic roles.

Gradually, the singer began to lose his voice. Theater administration moved him to the teaching work, but in 1904 he was fired. It became for him a huge psychological blow. Pavel Koshetz committed suicide on 2 March 1904.

His daughter Nina was at this time 12 years. She decided to become an opera singer.

After some time, in memory of Pavel Koshetz Leonid Sobinov organized two concerts, which involved famous singers partners of Pavel Koshetz.
