= Kondol =

Rural locality in Penza Oblast, Russia

Coordinates: 52°49′12″N 45°03′22″E

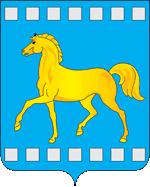
Coat of arms of Kondol (Penza oblast).

Kondol (Russian: Ко́ндоль) is a rural locality (a selo) and the administrative center of Penzensky District, Penza Oblast, Russia. Population: 3,324 (2010 census); 3,660 (2002 census); 4,023 (1989 Soviet census).

== Notable people ==
- Ivan Mosjoukine (1889–1939), actor
