= The Loves of Casanova =

1927 film

- Rina De Liguoro with Ivan Mosjoukine
- Directed by: Alexandre Volkoff
- Written by: Norbert Falk; Alexandre Volkoff; Ivan Mosjoukine
- Produced by: Noë Bloch; Gregor Rabinovitch
- Starring: Ivan Mosjoukine; Suzanne Bianchetti; Diana Karenne; Jenny Jugo; Rina De Liguoro
- Cinematography: Fédote Bourgasoff; Léonce-Henri Burel; Nikolai Toporkoff
- Production companies: Ciné-Alliance; Deulig Europa-Produktion; Société des Cinéromans
- Distributed by: Pathé
- Release date: 23 December 1927
- Running time: 132 minutes
- Country: France
- Languages: Silent Version; French Intertitle; Sound (Synchronized); English Intertitles

The Loves of Casanova or Casanova is a 1927 French Historical drama film directed by Alexandre Volkoff and starring Ivan Mozzhukhin, Suzanne Bianchetti and Diana Karenne. The film portrays the life and adventures of Giacomo Casanova (1725-1798). Many of those involved with the film were Russian emigres who had come to France following the Russian Revolution. A sound version was prepared by Metro-Goldwyn Mayer in 1929. While the sound version has no audible dialog, it features a synchronized musical score with sound effects using both the sound-on-disc and sound-on-film process.

Full film

== Cast ==
- Ivan Mosjoukine as Casanova
- Suzanne Bianchetti as Catherine II
- Diana Karenne as Maria, Duchess de Lardi
- Jenny Jugo as Thérèse
- Rina De Liguoro as Corticelli
- Nina Koshetz as Countess Vorontzoff
- Raymond Bouamerane as Djimmy
- Olga Day as Lady Stanhope
- Albert Decoeur as Duke of Bayreuth
- Dimitri Dimitriev as Lord Stanhope
- Paul Franceschi
- Paul Guidé as Gregori Orloff
- Rudolf Klein-Rogge as Czar Peter III
- Nathalie Lissenko
- Michel Simon as henchman
- Carlo Tedeschi as Menucci
- Maria Ivogün as soprano

== Music ==
The sound version features a theme song entitled “Until the Moon” by Julian Wright (words) and Horace Shepherd (music).

== Costume design ==
Boris Bilinsky designed with Barbara Karinska who went on to win an Oscar in 1948 for her color costume design on Joan of Arc.
