= People Die for Metal =

- Russian: Люди гибнут за металл
- Directed by: Alexandre Volkoff
- Starring: Zoya Karabanova; Iona Talanov; Yuri Yurovsky; Nicolas Rimsky; Elizaveta Valerskaya; Olga Kondorova; Klein; Popov
- Release date: 1919
- Country: Russian Empire
- Language: Russian

People Die for Metal (Russian: Люди гибнут за металл) is a 1919 silent film directed by Alexandre Volkoff.

== Plot ==
The film tells about a millionaire Gornostaev and ballerina Ilona, who cannot agree on the opinion what is more important - beauty and youth or money. Gornostaev gives a promise to Ilona for two years to prove that wealth is more important.

== Starring ==
- Zoya Karabanova
- Iona Talanov
- Yuri Yurovsky
- Nicolas Rimsky
- Elizaveta Valerskaya
- Olga Kondorova
- Klein
- Popov
