= The Porter from Maxim's (1927 film) =

1927 film

- Directed by: Roger Lion; Nicolas Rimsky
- Written by: Max Linder; Michel Linsky; Yves Mirande (play); Gustave Quinson (play)
- Produced by: Alexandre Kamenka
- Starring: Nicolas Rimsky; Pépa Bonafé; Simone Vaudry
- Cinematography: Maurice Desfassiaux; Paul Guichard
- Production company: Films Albatros
- Distributed by: Les Films Armor
- Release date: 14 October 1927
- Running time: 114 minutes
- Country: France
- Languages: Silent; French intertitles

The Porter from Maxim's (French: Le chasseur de chez Maxim's) is a 1927 French silent comedy film directed by Roger Lion and Nicolas Rimsky and starring Rimsky, Pépa Bonafé, and Simone Vaudry. It is based on the 1923 play of the same title, which has been made into films several times.

It was made by Films Albatros, a company established by exiles from the Russian Revolution. Art director Lazare Meerson worked on the film's set design. It was released in Germany in 1928 by the giant UFA.

== Cast ==
- Nicolas Rimsky as Julien Pauphilat
- Pépa Bonafé as Totoche
- Simone Vaudry as Mimi Pauphilat
- Eric Barclay as Marquis de la Guérinière
- Valeska Rimsky as Claire, Mimi's aunt
- Max Lerel as Octave
- Emile Royol as Jacobin Candebec
- Yvonneck as Florent Carambagnac
- Lou Davy
- Olga Day as Cricri
- Alexej Bondireff

== Bibliography ==
- Rearick, Charles. Paris Dreams, Paris Memories: The City and Its Mystique. Stanford University Press, 2011.
