= The Fugitive (1914 film) =

- Russian: Беглец
- Directed by: Alexandre Volkoff
- Starring: Asho Shakhatuni; Alesandr Rusteikis
- Release date: 1914
- Countries: Russian Empire; France
- Language: Russian

The Fugitive (Russian: Беглец, romanized: Beglets) is a 1914 Russian-French short film directed by Alexandre Volkoff.

== Plot ==
The film is based on a poem by Mikhail Lermontov.

Part 1. There are folk festivals in the village. Russian troops are approaching. Harun goes to war. During the battle, Harun's father and two brothers are killed, and he flees the battlefield out of fear.

Part 2 (not preserved). Harun wanders, returns to the aul, tries to justify himself to his relatives and dies.

== Cast ==
- Asho Shakhatuni
- Alesandr Rusteikis
