= Fugitive (Grimm) =

- Grimm episode
- Episode no.: Season 6 Episode 1
- Directed by: Aaron Lipstadt
- Written by: Jim Kouf; David Greenwalt
- Cinematography by: Eliot Rockett
- Editing by: George Pilkinton
- Production code: 601
- Original air date: January 6, 2017
- Running time: 42 minutes

Guest appearances
- Jacqueline Toboni as Theresa "Trubel" Rubel; Danny Bruno as Bud Wurstner; David Starzyk as Judge Stancroft; Hannah R. Loyd as Diana Schade-Renard; Robert Blanche as Sgt. Franco

Episode chronology
← Previous "The Beginning of the End"	Next → "Trust Me Knot"
- Grimm season 6

"Fugitive" is the first episode and season premiere of season 6 of the supernatural drama television series Grimm and the 111th episode overall, which premiered on January 6, 2017, on the cable network NBC. The episode was written by series creators David Greenwalt and Jim Kouf and was directed by Aaron Lipstadt.

== Plot ==
Opening quote: "Maybe this world is another planet's hell."

The episode opens on Nick Burkhardt and Sean Renard in Nick's loft, the scene of the previous season finale's final battle in which major Black Claw figure Bonaparte was killed by Sean's sword. Nick tentatively thanks Sean, but Sean admits to being unsure of his contribution. He wonders how Nick can be alive in spite of being hit by bullets, and Nick says he's unsure. Sean departs, leaving his sword.

Meanwhile, Monroe, Rosalee, Hank, Wu, Eve and Trubel are all still in the tunnel system accessed through the loft. Monroe and Rosalee are one of two groups separated in search for an exit. Rosalee brings up her pregnancy, and she and Monroe agree to not disclose it to anybody else. Both search parties return, and Nick meets the scared group who expect an attacker and marvel at Nick's being alive.

Sean meets Adalind at the mansion and tells her of Bonaparte's demise, mentioning he does not intend to confess his role and will instead blame Nick. He plays at Diana's possible involvement and also suggests Adalind will be sorry she fell in love with Nick. Adalind finds Diana in bed, and a doll and pin at the foot end, and Diana confirms that she played with her doll and did not want Bonaparte to ever hurt Adalind again.

Having returned from the tunnels, Nick's group splits up to remove evidence of the fights at Nick's loft and Rosalee's shop. At the shop, one of the corpses grips Eve's arm, and she enters a trancelike state. Rosalee identifies this as the Death Grip, and on consulting a book hacks off the attacker's hand as a remedy. Eve then returns to consciousness. Rosalee mentions that the Death Grip can return a dead wesen to life if they offer up a pure soul as barter. The group wonders how Eve's soul can be pure. At the loft, Adalind calls Nick, asking him to see her and Kelly and he agrees.

From the conversation with Adalind earlier, Nick goes to the Black Claw mansion to see Adalind. They kiss and reconcile. Nick gets to see Kelly and they talk about Diana. The meeting ends with a make-out session between her and Nick.

Trubel notices she still has the cloth that the mysterious stick was wrapped in, and shows it to Eve, who is able to see patterns on it that Trubel cannot, and which match marks Eve saw on the dead wesen's face during her Death Grip trance.

Meanwhile, Renard has obtained warrants for various premises and a shoot to kill order on Nick, and Hank and Wu relay inside police info to Nick, who has gone into hiding at Bud's place. At a meeting of Nick's group at Bud's, the group decides that Nick should leave Portland, and Eve explains to Nick that it might not be wise to use the stick continuously. As the episode closes, Nick and the group are still hiding at Bud's place, which is completely surrounded by heavily armed police.

== Reception ==
=== Viewers ===
The episode was viewed by 4.49 million people, earning a 0.9/4 in the 18-49 rating demographics on the Nielson ratings scale, ranking third on its timeslot and ninth for the night in the 18-49 demographics, behind Last Man Standing, MacGyver, Dr. Ken, Shark Tank, Hawaii Five-0, Emerald City, 20/20, and Blue Bloods. This was a 10% increase in viewership from the previous episode, which was watched by 4.03 million viewers with a 0.9/4 and it's also a 10% increase from the previous season premiere, which was watched by 4.04 million viewers with a 1.1/4 in the 18-49 demographics. This means that 0.9 percent of all households with televisions watched the episode, while 4 percent of all households watching television at that time watched it.

=== Critical reviews ===
"Fugitive" received positive reviews. The A.V. Club's Les Chappell gave the episode a "B−" grade and wrote, "“Fugitive” doesn’t provide an answer to the question right away, but that’s not a big surprise since Grimm’s season premieres are rarely when the show puts its best foot/paw/wing forward. The show’s predilection for the explosive finale means they always begin a new year picking through the shrapnel, and “The Beginning Of The End” left even more shrapnel than usual. The shattering of Hadrian’s Wall and Black Claw, Diana’s ability to kill off enemies with the power of her mind, and twin resurrections by the Splinter of Destiny are all big developments, and Team Grimm is battered around by all of them. The episode is a bit bowed by its obligation to introduce a new status quo, especially with the knowledge of an end date that means it could be the last one they ever do."

Kathleen Wiedel from TV Fanatic, gave a 4.0 star rating out of 5, stating: "There was barely a chance to take a breath at all during this episode, and the mostly tight story kept the tension properly ramped up for the situation."

Sara Netzley from EW, gave the episode a "B+" grade and wrote, "And despite having to watch Hank inform every single other character on the show that Nick is a wanted man, tonight’s season premiere was a tightly plotted slice of character-driven storytelling that heralds good things for the final 13 episodes of the little fairy tale show that could."
