= Natalya Lisenko =

Russian actress

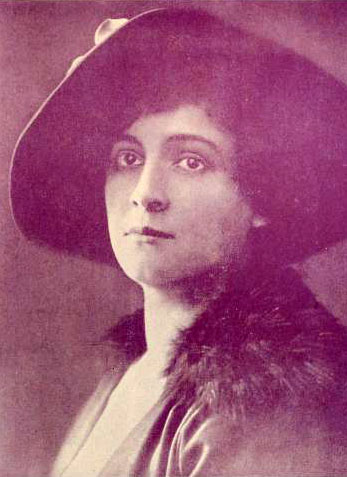
- Born: Natalya Andrianovna Lisenko; 10 August 1884; Nikolayev, Russian Empire
- Died: 7 October 1969 (aged 85); Paris, France
- Occupation: Actress
- Years active: 1915–1939
- Spouse(s): Nikolai Radin (divorced); Ivan Mosjoukine (divorced 1927)
- Relatives: Mykola Lysenko (uncle)

Natalya Andrianovna Lisenko (Russian: Наталья Андриановна Лисенко; 10 August 1884 – 7 October 1969), also known as Nathalie Lissenko, was a Russian actress who was active during the silent era.

== Biography ==
Natalya Andrianovna Lisenko was born on 10 August 1884 to Andrew Lisenko (1851–1910), a physician. She had an older brother, Yuriy Lisenko (1881–1958). Some sources list Lisenko's birth date as 1886. She was the niece of the Ukrainian composer Mykola Lysenko.

In 1904 she left school at Moscow Art Theatre and started to work in theater with her first husband Nikolai Radin. After they were divorced, Natalya Lisenko became the wife of the well known Russian actor Ivan Mosjoukine, and they appeared in multiple films together.

Her film debut was in Katyusha Maslova (1915), directed by Pyotr Chardynin and based on Leo Tolstoy's novel Resurrection.

In 1920, Natalya Lisenko, alongside her husband and several other actors, left Russia and moved to Paris. There, she continued her film career, starring in productions such as Kean (1924) and The Lion of the Moguls (1924). Her final film appearance was in The Fatted Calf (1939).

She died in Paris and is buried in Sainte-Geneviève-des-Bois Russian Cemetery near her second husband Mosjoukine.

== Roles in cinema ==
- 1915 — film: Катюша Маслова / Katyusha Maslova — role: Katyusha Maslova
- 1915 — Леон Дрей — Berth
- 1915 — На окраинах Москвы — Vasilisa, a cook
- 1915 — Наташа Проскурова — Natasha
- 1915 — Николай Ставрогин
- 1915 — Тайна нижегородской ярмарки
- 1916 — Без вины виноватые — Kruchinina
- 1916 — Грех — Yelena
- 1916 — Жизнь — миг, искусство — вечно
- 1916 — И песнь осталась недопетой — a countess Валишевская
- 1916 — Любовь сильна не страстью поцелуя — a singer in cabaret
- 1916 — На бойком месте — Yevgenia
- 1916 — Нищая — an actress
- 1916 — Суд божий — Rybtsova
- 1916 — Сын гадалки — a fortuneteller
- 1916 — Ястребиное гнездо — Глаша, любовница Осоргина
- 1917 — Во власти греха — Елена
- 1917 — Горькая доля — Катерина
- 1917 — Кулисы экрана — actress Natalya Lisenko (cameo)
- 1917 — Не говорите мне, он умер — Jeanna, the wife of the artist
- 1917 — Прокурор — actress Бетти Клай
- 1917 — Сатана ликующий (Satan Triumphant) — Esfire
- 1918 — Богатырь духа — Iza
- 1918 — Father Sergius
- 1918 — Малютка Элли — Клара Кларсон
- 1918 — Немой страж — The mistress of the count
- 1918 — Черная стая
- 1918 — Член парламента
- 1919 — Голгофа женщины
- 1919 — Наследник по заказу
- 1919 — Ответный удар
- 1919 — Тайна королевы — Queen
- L'Angoissante aventure (France, 1920), as Yvonne Lelys
- L'Enfant du carnaval (France, 1921), as Yvonne
- 1921 — Закон и любовь
- Justice d'abord (France, 1921)
- 1921 — Слуга слепого долга
- Tempêtes, (France, 1922), as Sonia
- 1922 — Голос совести
- La Fille sauvage (France, 1922), as Jacqueline Gervoise
- Nuit de carnaval (France, 1922)
- La Riposte (France, 1922)
- 1923 — Когда дьявол спит
- Le Brasier ardent (France, 1923), as The woman
- Calvaire d'amour (France, 1923), as Hélène Brémond
- 1923 — Проходящие тени
- 1923 — Страшное приключение (Germany, France) — Clarisse
- L'Affiche (France, 1924), as Marie
- Kean (France, 1924), as Countess Elena de Koefeld
- Les Ombres qui passent (France, 1924), as Jaqueline del Sorio
- The Lion of the Moguls (France, 1924), as Anna
- Le Double Amour (France, 1925), as Countess Laure Maresco
- Children's Souls Accuse You (Germany, 1927), as Luise Enzenberg
- The Loves of Casanova (France, 1927)
- En rade (France, 1927)
- Rasputin, the Holy Sinner (Germany, 1928), as Mrs. Tatarinoff
- Five Anxious Days (Germany, 1928), as Wladimir Voikoff's mother
- Hurrah! I Live! (Germany, 1928), as Johanne Kruis
- Nights of Princes (France, 1930)
- That Scoundrel Morin (France, 1932)
- Mirages de Paris (France, 1933)
- The 1002nd Night (France, 1933), as Fatima
- The Fatted Calf (France, 1939), as La dame de compagnie
