= Fugitive.vim =

fugitive.vim
- An example of using fugitive.vim's :Gblame feature
- Original author: Tim Pope
- Developer: Tim Pope et al.
- Initial release: 15 February 2010; 15 years ago
- Stable release: 3.7 / 7 June 2022; 3 years ago
- Repository: github.com/tpope/vim-fugitive
- Written in: Vim script
- Operating system: Unix, Linux, Windows NT, macOS, iOS, Android, AmigaOS
- Available in: English
- Type: Git wrapper; Text editor plugin
- License: Free software (Vim License), charityware

fugitive.vim, also called vim-fugitive or just fugitive, is a Git wrapper written as a plugin for the Vim text editor. It was originally developed by Tim Pope, who still maintains the plugin.

== Name ==
As with other plugins by Tim Pope, the name of the plugin obliquely refers to its functionality. "fugitive.vim" contains the substring "git", as it is a Git wrapper. Pope later wrote rhubarb.vim, whose name contains the substring "hub", as it provides the :Gbrowse command to work with GitHub. In a talk, Pope explained, "It's got the word 'git' in it because it works with Git. It was either that or 'agitate' and I think that might have been a better choice."

"fugitive.vim" is the plugin's filename, while "vim-fugitive" is used for the GitHub repository name as well as for the package name in several Linux distributions.

== History ==
The initial commit to the Git repository of the project was made on October 10, 2009.

The initial version (version 1.0) was released on February 15, 2010.

Starting in March 2014 fugitive.vim was included in Debian's unstable branch.

== Features ==
The plugin provides standard Git commands from inside Vim, such as :Gstatus for git status.

It also allows an interactive vertical split for git blame.

== Reception ==
fugitive.vim is one of around 30 Vim plugins to have its own package in the Ubuntu package repository. It is also one of 16 Vim plugins in the official Fedora package repository. The plugin is also available from the Arch Linux packages repository.

The plugin is part of Vim distributions including spf13 and Janus.

Drew Neil of Vimcasts covered fugitive.vim favorably in a multi-part series.

The scripts page for fugitive.vim on the Vim website shows that the plugin has been downloaded almost 13,000 times. As of February 2017, the plugin's repository on GitHub has nearly 8,000 stars, and is the eighth most popular Vim script GitHub repository by number of stars.

== See also ==
- Magit, a Git wrapper for GNU Emacs
