= Fédote Bourgasoff =

Russian cinematographer

- Born: 9 March 1890; Lokhvitsa, Russian Empire (now Ukraine)
- Died: 12 May 1945 (aged 55); Boulogne-Billancourt, France
- Other name: Fiodor Burgasow
- Occupation: Cinematographer
- Years active: 1917-1944 (film)

Fédote Bourgasoff (9 March 1890 – 12 May 1945) was a Russian-born French cinematographer.

== Life and career ==
He was born Fyodor Burgasow in Lokhvitsa, Poltava then in the Russian Empire and now in Ukraine. After establishing himself in Russian Empire cinema, Bourgasoff fled to France following the Russian Revolution. He worked frequently on films there until his death, often on projects involving many other Russian exiles.

Burgasov began his career as a still photographer and cameraman with Iosif Ermolev's company and subsequently lensed Yakov Protazanov's Father Sergius (1918), among other films. After his immigration to France as a member of Ermolev's entourage, Burgasov became the most prolific cinematographer in the newly founded Paris company Les Films Ermolieff, renamed later, after Ermolev's departure, Productions Albatros. Thus, he filmed Aleksandr Volkov's serial The House of Mystery (1923), Viacheslav Turzhanski's The Song of Triumphant Love (1923), and numerous others. Burgasov successfully worked with French directors whose films also were produced by Ermolev, including Jean Epstein (The Lion of the Moguls, 1924) and Marcel L’Herbier (The Late Mattia Pascal, 1925). He was the cameraman on several sound versions of silent movie hits such as The Loves of Casanova (1933) and The Child of Carnival (1934); among his noteworthy works are Jean Renoir's The Lower Depths (1936) from Maksim Gorky's play, and Max Ophüls's Werther (1938), an adaptation of Goethe's novel. His last film was Sacha Guitry's La Malibran (1944), a biopic about a French opera singer.

== Selected filmography ==
- Father Sergius (1917)
- The House of Mystery (1923)
- The Loves of Casanova (1927)
- Muche (1927)
- Secrets of the Orient (1928)
- Checkmate (1931)
- The Malay Dagger (1931)
- Imperial Violets (1932)
- Beauty Spot (1932)
- Rouletabille the Aviator (1932)
- Knock (1933)
- The Orderly (1933)
- Casanova (1934)
- Skylark (1934)
- The Mysteries of Paris (1935)
- Juanita (1935)
- Adémaï in the Middle Ages (1935)
- The Volga Boatman (1936)
- The Lower Depths (1936)
- Nights of Princes (1938)
- The Novel of Werther (1938)
- That's Sport (1938)
- The Black Diamond (1941)
- Happy Days (1941)
- Notre-Dame de la Mouise (1941)
- Last Adventure (1942)
- The Newspaper Falls at Five O'Clock (1942)
- My Last Mistress (1943)

== Bibliography ==
- Klossner, Michael. The Europe of 1500-1815 on film and television. McFarland & Co, 2002.
