= Alexandre Volkoff (actor) =

Russian actor and film director (1885–1942)

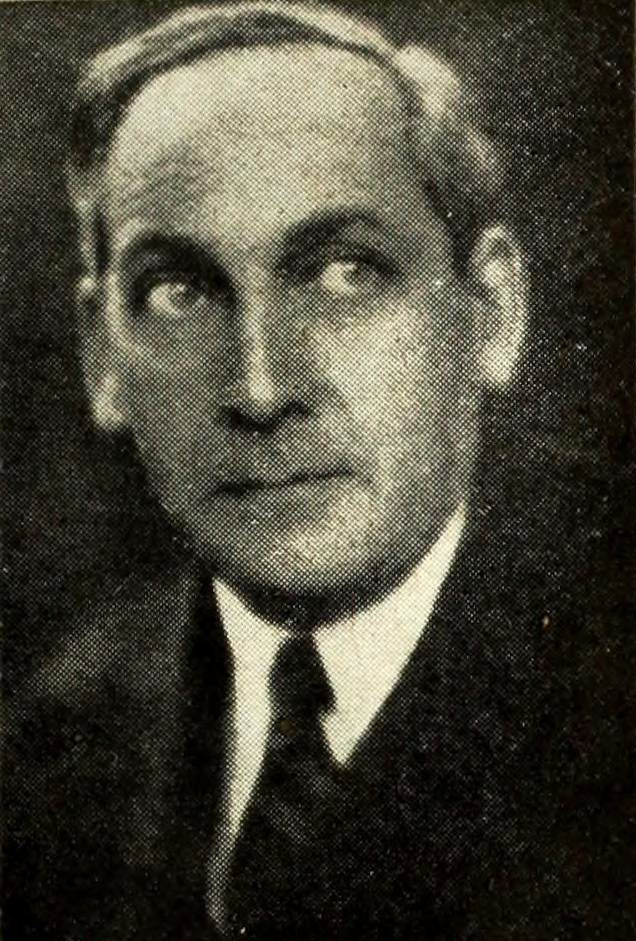
- Born: 27 December 1885; Moscow, Russia
- Died: 22 May 1942 (aged 56); Rome, Italy
- Other name: Alexander Wolkoff
- Occupations: Actor; screenwriter; film director
- Years active: 1913–1941

Alexandre Volkoff (Russian: Александр Александрович Волков, romanized: Aleksandr Aleksandrovich Volkov; 27 December 1885 – 22 May 1942) was a Russian actor, screenwriter and film director. He established his film career in Russia and was one of a significant number of film artists who fled the country following the Bolshevik takeover.

The bulk of his output was in France where he was known as Alexandre Volkoff. He also made films in Germany and later Italy and collaborated several times with his fellow Russian exile, the actor Ivan Mozzhukhin.

== Selected filmography ==
=== Director ===
Features unless otherwise specified:

- The Fugitive – a short film, Russia, France
- The Green Spider (1916) – a short film, Russia
- Father Sergius (1917) – co-director, Russia
- People Die for Metal (1919) – Russia
- The House of Mystery (1923) – France
- Les Ombres qui passent (1924) – France
- Kean (1924) – France
- The Loves of Casanova (1927) – France
- Secrets of the Orient (1928) – France
- The White Devil (1930) – Germany
- Stjenka Rasin (1936) – Germany
- Amore imperiale (1941) – Italy

=== Screenwriter ===
- Heart of an Actress (1924, dir. Germaine Dulac) – France

== Bibliography ==
- Phillips, Alastair. City of Darkness, City of Light: Émigré Filmmakers in Paris, 1929–1939. Amsterdam University Press, 2004.
