= Ivan Mosjoukine =

Russian actor (1889–1939)

- Иван Мозжухин
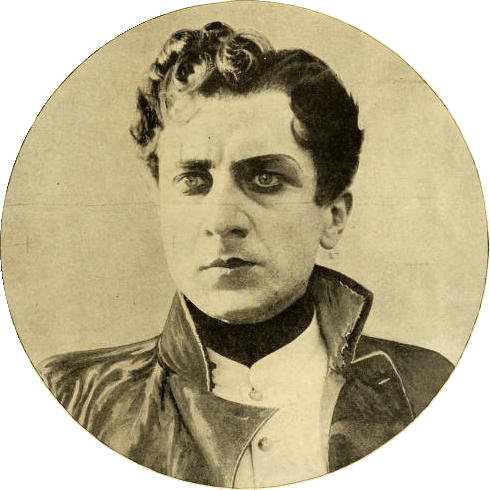
- Mosjoukine in 1917
- Born: Ivan Ilyich Mozzhukhin; 26 September 1889; Kondol, Russia
- Died: 18 January 1939 (aged 49); Paris, France
- Other names: Jwan Mosjukin; Ivan Mozzukhine; Iwan Mosjoukine
- Occupation: Actor
- Years active: 1911–1936
- Spouse(s): Natalya Lisenko (m. 1912; div. 1927) Agnes Petersen (m. 1928, divorced) Tania Fédor (divorced)

Ivan Ilyich Mozzhukhin (Russian: Иван Ильич Мозжухин, Russian pronunciation: [ɪˈvan ɨˈlʲjitɕ mɐˈʑːʉxʲɪn]; 26 September [O.S. 14 September] 1889 – 18 January 1939), usually billed using the French transliteration Ivan Mosjoukine, was a Russian silent film actor.

== Career in Russia ==
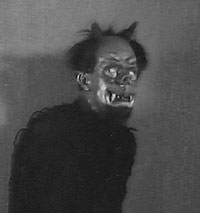
Mosjoukine as the demon in The Night Before Christmas (1913)

Ivan Mozzhukhin was born in Kondol, in Saratov Governorate of the Russian Empire (present-day Penza Oblast), the youngest of four brothers. His mother Rachel Ivanovna Mozzhukhina (née Lastochkina) was the daughter of a Russian Orthodox priest, while his father Ilya Ivanovich Mozzhukhin came from peasants and served as an estate manager for the noble Obolensky family. He inherited this position from his own father—a serf whose children were granted freedom as a gratitude for his service.

While all three elder brothers finished seminary, Ivan was sent to the Penza gymnasium for boys and later studied law at the Moscow State University. In 1910, he left academic life to join a troupe of traveling actors from Kiev, with which he toured for a year, gaining experience and a reputation for dynamic stage presence. Upon returning to Moscow, he launched his screen career with the 1911 adaptation of Tolstoy's The Kreutzer Sonata. He also starred in A House in Kolomna (1913, after Pushkin), Pyotr Chardynin directed drama Do You Remember? opposite the popular Russian ballerina Vera Karalli (1914), Nikolay Stavrogin (1915, after Dostoyevsky's The Devils, or The Possessed), The Queen of Spades (1916, after Pushkin) and other adaptations of Russian classics.

== The Kuleshov Effect ==
Mosjoukine's most lasting contribution to the theoretical concept of film as image is the legacy of his own face in recurring representation of illusory reactions seen in Lev Kuleshov's psychological montage experiment which demonstrated the Kuleshov Effect. In 1918, the first full year of the Russian Revolution, Kuleshov assembled his revolutionary illustration of the application of the principles of film editing out of footage from one of Mosjoukine's Tsarist-era films which had been left behind when he, along with his entire film production company, departed for the relative safety of Crimea in 1917.

== Career in France ==
At the end of 1919, Mosjoukine arrived in Paris and quickly established himself as one of the top stars of the French silent cinema, starring in one successful film after another. Handsome, tall, and possessing a powerful screen presence, he won a considerable following as a mysterious and exotic romantic figure.

The first film of his French career was also his final Russian film. L'Angoissante Aventure (The Harrowing Adventure) was a dramatized record of the difficult and dangerous journey of Russian actors, directors and other film artists as they made their way from Crimea into the chaos of Ottoman Turkey in the midst of the post–World War I fall of the Sultanate. The group was headed by the renowned director Yakov Protazanov and included Mosjoukine's frequent leading lady Natalya Lisenko (billed in France as Nathalie Lissenko), whom he married and later divorced. Their ultimate destination was Paris, which became the new capital for most of the exiled former aristocrats and other refugees escaping the Russian Civil War. The film was completed and released in Paris in November 1920.

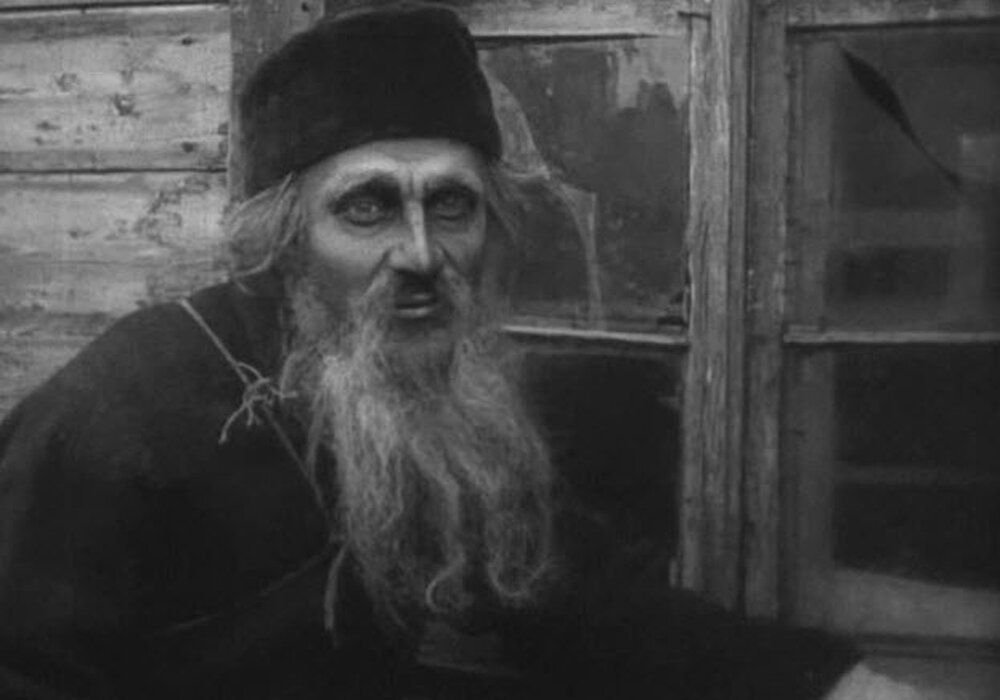
Ivan Mosjoukine as Father Sergius in the 1917 film

Mosjoukine's film stardom was assured and during the 1920s, his face with the trademark hypnotic stare appeared on covers of film magazines all over Europe. He wrote the screenplays for most of his starring vehicles and directed two of them, L'Enfant du carnaval (Child of the Carnival), released on 29 August 1921 and Le Brasier ardent (The Blazing Inferno), released on 2 November 1923. The leading lady in both films was the then–"Madame Mosjoukine", Nathalie Lissenko. Brasier, in particular, was highly praised for its innovative and inventive concepts, but ultimately proved too surreal and bizarre to become financially successful. Styled like a semi-comic Kafkaesque nightmare, the film has him playing a detective known only as "Z" hired by an older husband to follow his adventurous young wife. However, the plot was only the device which Mosjoukine and his assistant director Alexandre Volkoff used to experiment with the audience's perception of reality. Many of the scenes seem to be taking place on sets that are disconcertingly larger than normal and one particularly striking staging has the husband entering the detective agency to find a synchronized line of men, presumably detectives, all wearing tuxedos and gliding about in formation. Mosjoukine received praise for his enthusiastic acting and display of emotion.

== Surrender in Hollywood ==
According to popular myth, when Rudolph Valentino died on 23 August 1926, Hollywood producers began searching for another face or image that might capture some iota of that unique screen presence radiated by "The Great Lover". However, Mosjoukine was signed by Universal before Valentino's death, as the 14 August 1926 edition of Motion Picture News mentions Mosjoukine's role in Michel Strogoff as Universal had just announced that they were bringing the film to the American market. Universal's Laemmle was mentioned as having signed Mosjoukine to come to America that fall. A few of the French productions which starred Mosjoukine were seen in large U.S. cities, where multitudes of cinemas regularly presented European films, but he was a generally unfamiliar persona to the large majority of American audiences. Universal's Carl Laemmle, who had employed Valentino as a supporting actor in two 1919–1920 films, found out that Mosjoukine was frequently described by the European press as the Russian Valentino.

However, as it turned out, Surrender, filmed in the summer of 1927, did not trust Mosjukine to carry the storyline. He was only the film's co-star, with the top billing and the central role going to Mary Philbin, a popular leading lady of the period who, eighteen months earlier, had the showy role of Christine, the focus of Lon Chaney's obsession and love in The Phantom of the Opera. The recent Russian Revolution was a popular film subject of the time, with the 1928 John Barrymore-Camilla Horn teaming in Tempest and the Emil Jannings vehicle The Last Command, released three months after Surrender, being two examples of the genre. Since Laemmle's new star was a genuine survivor of the Revolution, it seemed only natural that the story would be set in that milieu.

Symptomatic of Mosjoukine's co-star status, he does not even appear in the first fifteen minutes of the film, which are occupied with the depiction of life in an Eastern European Jewish settlement on the eve of World War I. Eventually, at the centerpiece of the plot Mary Philbin, as the virginal daughter of the village rabbi, is confronted with the startling choice of willingly "surrendering" her maidenhood to Mosjoukine's aristocratic leader of the Cossack detachment sent to wipe out her village, or refusing and seeing him carry out his assignment. While this type of personality fitted into Valentino's past Son of the Sheik characterization of a dominant, forceful lover who initially takes women against their will, until they melt under the radiance of his sheer animal magnetism, it ran against Mosjoukine's European Casanova image as a fatalistically irresistible paramour to whom women flock and "surrender" without any hint of force or threat, but simply because of their inability to resist.

This basic misunderstanding of the dissimilarity between Valentino and Mosjoukine combined with journeyman direction by Edward Sloman and Mary Philbin's unresponsiveness and lack of chemistry with her leading man, consigned the film to a tepid reception by the critics and the public. Although moderately profitable, it was not the money-making hit that Laemmle expected. Mosjoukine received some good notices, but a number of critics doubted his suitability for American audiences. An even more ominous note, however, was sounded at the film's Broadway premiere on 10 October 1927. Another film, playing across the street, had its premiere four days earlier, on 6 October. The Jazz Singer was attracting much bigger audiences than Surrender and, as it was ushering in voice-on-film, would soon sound the death knell for Mosjoukine's career as a silent film star, as his heavy Russian accent eventually dealt a crippling blow to his hopes of continuing in talkies.

== Return to Europe ==
After the unsuccessful attempt at a Hollywood career, Mosjoukine returned to Europe. The remainder of his film career, appearing in a new film every year until at least 1936, was spent in Europe. He appeared mainly in German films in the last years of the Weimar Republic, moving to France after the rise of the Nazis to power. In both countries he was often given roles in films with a Russian background. Many of his films were directed by fellow Russian emigres Vladimir Strizhevsky, Victor Tourjansky, and Alexandre Volkoff.

== Personal life ==
Mosjoukine had three elder brothers. Alexander Mozzhukhin (1878–1972) was a famous opera singer who also left Russia for Paris in 1926. After his death his wife Cleo Carini returned to the Soviet Union, bringing her husband's archives along with her which included many documents. Among them was an autobiography and many letters from his family members, including Ivan. They are currently stored in the Russian State Archive of Literature and Art and in several museums.

Mosjoukine's second brother Aleksey (born 1880) served as an officer in the Imperial Russian Army and was later enrolled to the Red Army. In 1931 he was arrested and sentenced to three years in prison for Anti-Soviet agitation. In 1937 he was arrested for the second time on the same account and by the NKVD troika's decision sentenced to death. Konstantin Mozzhukhin (born 1882) was also an army officer who served in the Imperial Russian Navy. In 1935 he and his father were arrested and sent to Yrgyz in the Kazakh SSR. In 1937 he was arrested for the second time, also for Anti-Soviet agitation, and sentenced to ten years of labor camps. The date of his death is unknown.

Mosjoukine was officially married three times. His first wife was the Russian actress Natalya Lisenko (1884–1960). They married in 1912 and divorced in 1927. In 1928 Mosjoukine married a Danish actress Agnes Petersen (1906–1973). His third wife was a French actress of Russian origin Tania Fédor (1905–1985), although they were married only for a brief period of time.

As a teenager Mosjoukine became romantically involved with Olga Bronitskaya (born Telegina)—an actress from the popular traveling troupe led by her brother Petr Zarechny. In 1908 she gave birth to their illegitimate son Aleksandr who was registered as the son of Petr Zarechny under his official family name. Thus the boy was raised as Aleksandr Petrovich Telegin, although he was made aware of his real father. For several years Mosjoukine traveled with his civil wife and his son before returning to Moscow and marrying Natalya Lisenko. According to Telegin, his father always supported them by sending letters, money and packages until his name came under a ban in the Soviet Union. Telegin and his family lived in Moscow, although they had to conceal their origin. To this day he remains Mosjoukine's only confirmed offspring.

French novelist Romain Gary claimed that his birth was the result of an affair between Mosjoukine and his mother Nina Owczyńska, a Polish-Jewish actress who later married Arieh Kacew. In 1960 he wrote a novelized autobiographical account of his mother's struggles and triumphs, La promesse de l'aube (Promise at Dawn), which became the basis for an English-language play and a French-American film. The play, Samuel A. Taylor's First Love, opened on Broadway at the Morosco Theatre on Christmas Day 1961 and closed on 13 January 1962, after 24 performances. In 1970, returning to its original title, it was adapted for the screen and directed by Jules Dassin as a vehicle for his wife Melina Mercouri (then aged 49), who played Nina. Dassin, who was 59 years old at the time, chose to play Mosjoukine himself in the single scene that the character appears in the film.

== Death ==
Ivan Mosjoukine died of tuberculosis in a Neuilly-sur-Seine clinic. All available sources give his age as 49 and year of birth as 1889. However, his gravestone at the Russian cemetery in the Parisian suburb of Sainte-Genevieve-des-Bois is inscribed with the year 1887.

== Selected filmography ==
- The Kreutzer Sonata (1911, dir. Pyotr Chardynin), as Troukhatchevsky
- Defence of Sevastopol (1911, dir. Vasily Goncharov and Aleksandr Khanzhonkov), as Admiral Vladimir Kornilov
- The Night Before Christmas (1913, dir. Ladislas Starevich), as The demon
- Domik v Kolomne (The Little House in Kolomna) (1913)
- The Queen of Spades (1916, dir. Yakov Protazanov), as Hermann
- Satan Triumphant (1917, dir. Yakov Protazanov)
- Father Sergius (1917, dir. Yakov Protazanov and Alexandre Volkoff), as Prince Kasatsky / Father Sergius
- L'Angoissante aventure (1920, dir. Yakov Protazanov), as Henri de Granier
- L'Enfant du carnaval (1921, dir. Ivan Mosjoukine), as Marquis Serge de Granier
- Justice d'abord (1921, dir. Yakov Protazanov)
- Tempêtes (1922, dir. Robert Boudrioz), as Henri
- The House of Mystery (1923, dir. Alexandre Volkoff), as Julien Villandrit
- Le Brasier ardent (1923, dir. Ivan Mosjoukine), as Z
- Kean (1924, dir. Alexandre Volkoff), as Edmund Kean
- Les Ombres qui passent (1924, dir. Alexandre Volkoff), as Louis Barclay
- The Lion of the Moguls (1924, dir. Jean Epstein), as Prince Roundghito-Sing
- Feu Mathias Pascal (1925, dir. Marcel L'Herbier), as Mathias Pascal
- Michel Strogoff (1926, dir. Victor Tourjansky), as Michael Strogoff
- The Loves of Casanova (1927, dir. Alexandre Volkoff), as Giacomo Casanova
- Surrender (1927, dir. Edward Sloman), as Constantine
- The President (1928, dir. Gennaro Righelli), as Pepe Torre
- The Secret Courier (1928, dir. Gennaro Righelli), as Julien Sorel
- The Adjutant of the Czar (1929, dir. Vladimir Strizhevsky), as Prince Boris Kurbski
- Manolescu (1929, dir. Victor Tourjansky), as Georges Manolescu
- The White Devil (1930, dir. Alexandre Volkoff), as Hadji Murat
- Sergeant X (1932, dir. Vladimir Strizhevsky), as Jean Renaud
- The 1002nd Night (1933, dir. Alexandre Volkoff), as Prince Tahar
- Casanova (1934, dir. René Barberis), as Giacomo Casanova
- L'Enfant du carnaval (1934, dir. Alexandre Volkoff), as Henri Strogonoff
- Nitchevo (1936, dir. Jacques de Baroncelli), as Meuter

== See also ==
- Aleksandr Khanzhonkov
- Ossip Runitsch
- Vitold Polonsky
- Pyotr Chardynin
