= Alexandre Kamenka =

Russian-French film producer

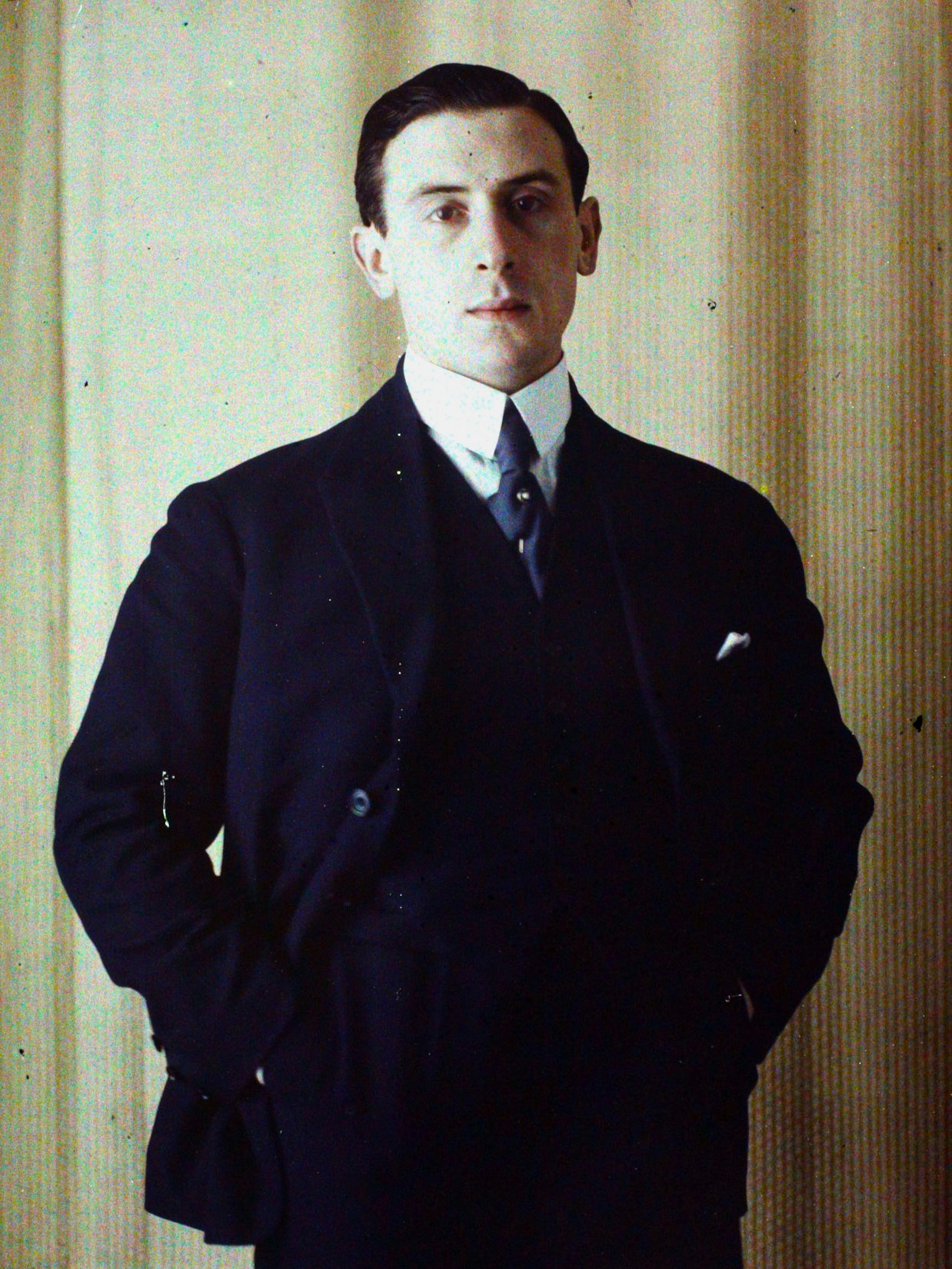
- 1919 Autochrome by Auguste Léon
- Born: 8 May 1888; Odessa, Kherson Governorate, Russian Empire
- Died: 3 December 1969 (aged 81); Paris, France
- Occupation: Producer
- Years active: 1923 - 1960 (film)

Alexandre Kamenka (8 May 1888 – 3 December 1969) was a Russian-French film producer. He was born the son of Boris Kamenka in Odessa, Russian Empire. He fled following the Russian Revolution and went to France where he established the production company Films Albatros. A number of other Russian exiles were involved with the company.

== Selected filmography ==
- Kean (1924)
- That Scoundrel Morin (1924)
- Carmen (1926)
- The Porter from Maxim's (1927)
- The Italian Straw Hat (1928)
- Two Timid Souls (1928)
- Baccarat (1929)
- Cagliostro (1929)
- Antoinette (1932)
- The Invisible Woman (1933)
- Hotel Free Exchange (1934)
- The Messenger (1937)
- The Bouquinquant Brothers (1947)
- The Barton Mystery (1949)
- Guilty? (1951)

== Bibliography ==
- Andrew, Dudley. Mists of Regret: Culture and Sensibility in Classic French Film. Princeton University Press, 1995.
