= Michael Strogoff (disambiguation) =

Michael Strogoff is an 1876 novel by Jules Verne.

Michael Strogoff may also refer to:

- Michel Strogoff (1926 film), a French silent historical adventure film
- Michel Strogoff (1936 film), a French historical adventure film
- Michael Strogoff (1944 film), a Mexican historical drama film
- Michel Strogoff (1956 film), a historical adventure film
- Michel Strogoff (miniseries), a French / Italian / West German miniseries
