= Nights of Princes =

Nights of Princes (French: Nuits de princes) may refer to:

- Nights of Princes (novel), a 1927 novel by Joseph Kessel
- Nights of Princes (1930 film), a French film adaptation directed by Marcel L'Herbier
- Nights of Princes (1938 film), a French film adaptation directed by Vladimir Strizhevsky
