= The Soldier and the Lady =

1937 film directed by George Nicholls, Jr.

- Directed by: George Nicholls, Jr. Edward Donahue (assistant)
- Screenplay by: Mortimer Offner; Anthony Veiller; Anne Morrison Chapin
- Based on: Michel Strogoff; 1876 novel by Jules Verne
- Produced by: Pandro S. Berman; Joseph Ermolieff (associate)
- Starring: Anton Walbrook; Elizabeth Allan; Margot Grahame; Akim Tamiroff; Fay Bainter; Eric Blore
- Cinematography: Joseph H. August
- Edited by: Frederic Knudtson
- Music by: Nathaniel Shilkret
- Production company: RKO Radio Pictures
- Distributed by: RKO Radio Pictures
- Release date: April 9, 1937 (US)
- Running time: 85 minutes
- Country: United States
- Language: English

The Soldier and the Lady is the 1937 American adventure film version of the oft-produced 1876 Jules Verne novel, Michel Strogoff. Produced by Pandro S. Berman, he hired as his associate producer, Joseph Ermolieff. Ermolieff had produced two earlier versions of the film, Michel Strogoff in France, and The Czar's Courier in Germany, both released in 1936. Both the earlier films had starred the German actor Adolf Wohlbrück. Berman also imported Wohlbrück, changing his name to Anton Walbrook to have him star in the American version. Other stars of the film were Elizabeth Allan, Margot Grahame, Akim Tamiroff, Fay Bainter and Eric Blore. RKO Radio Pictures had purchased the rights to the French version of the movie, and used footage from that film in the American production. The film was released on April 9, 1937.

== Plot ==
The Tsar sends courier Michael Strogoff to deliver vital information to Grand Duke Vladimir far away in Siberia. The Tartars, aided by renegade Ogareff, have risen up against the Russian Empire.

== Cast ==
- Anton Walbrook as Michael Strogoff
- Elizabeth Allan as Nadia
- Akim Tamiroff as Ogareff
- Margot Grahame as Zangarra
- Fay Bainter as Strogoff's Mother
- Eric Blore as Blount
- Edward Brophy as Packer
- Paul Guilfoyle as Vasiley
- William Stack as Grand Duke
- Paul Harvey as Tsar
- Michael Visaroff as Innkeeper
- Leonard Ceeley as Tsar's aide (uncredited)

== Reception ==
Writing for Night and Day in 1937, Graham Greene gave the film a mildly positive review, claiming that this version of the film was a great cinematographic improvement of the 1926 classic directed by Ivan Mosjoukine. Comparing the film to a "dashing and open-air ... good Western" Greene found the film to be "motivated in the grand manner", and noted that although the film "remains incurably comic even in tragedy", it remains a "simple, passionate and certainly sensuous [film] like a poem for boys, and not a bad poem either."
