= Heinz Goldberg =

German director and screenwriter (1891–1969)

- Born: 30 May 1891; Königsberg, East Prussia, German Empire
- Died: July 1969 (aged 78); West Berlin, West Germany
- Occupations: Writer, Director
- Years active: 1923–1936 (film)

Heinz Goldberg (1891–1969) was a German screenwriter. He also directed two silent films. Following the Nazi Party's rise to power in 1933, the Jewish Goldberg went into exile in several countries including Austria and the Soviet Union before settling in Britain. He returned to Germany in the 1950s.

== Filmography ==
- Paganini (dir. Heinz Goldberg, 1923)
- The Money Devil (dir. Heinz Goldberg, 1923)
- Rags and Silk (dir. Richard Oswald, 1925)
- The Director General (dir. Fritz Wendhausen, 1925)
- The Elegant Bunch (dir. Jaap Speyer, 1925)
- A Woman with Style (dir. Fritz Wendhausen, 1928)
- The Little Slave (dir. Luise Fleck and Jacob Fleck, 1928)
- Children of the Street (dir. Carl Boese, 1929)
- The Last Company (dir. Curtis Bernhardt, 1930)
- Dreyfus (dir. Richard Oswald, 1930)
- L'Homme qui assassina (dir. Curtis Bernhardt and Jean Tarride, 1931)
  - The Man Who Murdered (dir. Curtis Bernhardt, 1931)
  - Stamboul (dir. Dimitri Buchowetzki, 1931)
  - El hombre que asesinó (dir. Dimitri Buchowetzki and Fernando Gomis, 1932)
- 1914 (dir. Richard Oswald, 1931)
- Danton (dir. Hans Behrendt, 1931)
- Poor as a Church Mouse (dir. Richard Oswald, 1931)
- Distorting at the Resort (dir. Victor Janson, 1932)
- Chauffeur Antoinette (dir. Herbert Selpin, 1932)
  - The Love Contract (dir. Herbert Selpin, 1932)
  - Conduisez-moi Madame (dir. Herbert Selpin, 1932)
- Holzapfel Knows Everything (dir. Victor Janson, 1932)
- Unheimliche Geschichten (dir. Richard Oswald, 1932)
- Was sagt Onkel Emil dazu? (dir. Adolf E. Licho, 1932, short)
- Honour Among Thieves (dir. Richard Oswald, 1933)
- The Flower of Hawaii (dir. Richard Oswald, 1933)
- A Song Goes Round the World (dir. Richard Oswald, 1933)
- Last Love (dir. Fritz Schulz, 1935)
- Heut' ist der schönste Tag in meinem Leben (dir. Richard Oswald, 1936)
- Merijntje Gijzens Jeugd (dir. Kurt Gerron, 1936)

== Bibliography ==
- Mitchell, Charles P. The Great Composers Portrayed on Film, 1913 through 2002. McFarland, 2004.
- Prawer, S.S. Between Two Worlds: The Jewish Presence in German and Austrian Film, 1910-1933. Berghahn Books, 2005.
