= Peter Voß =

German actor (1891–1979)

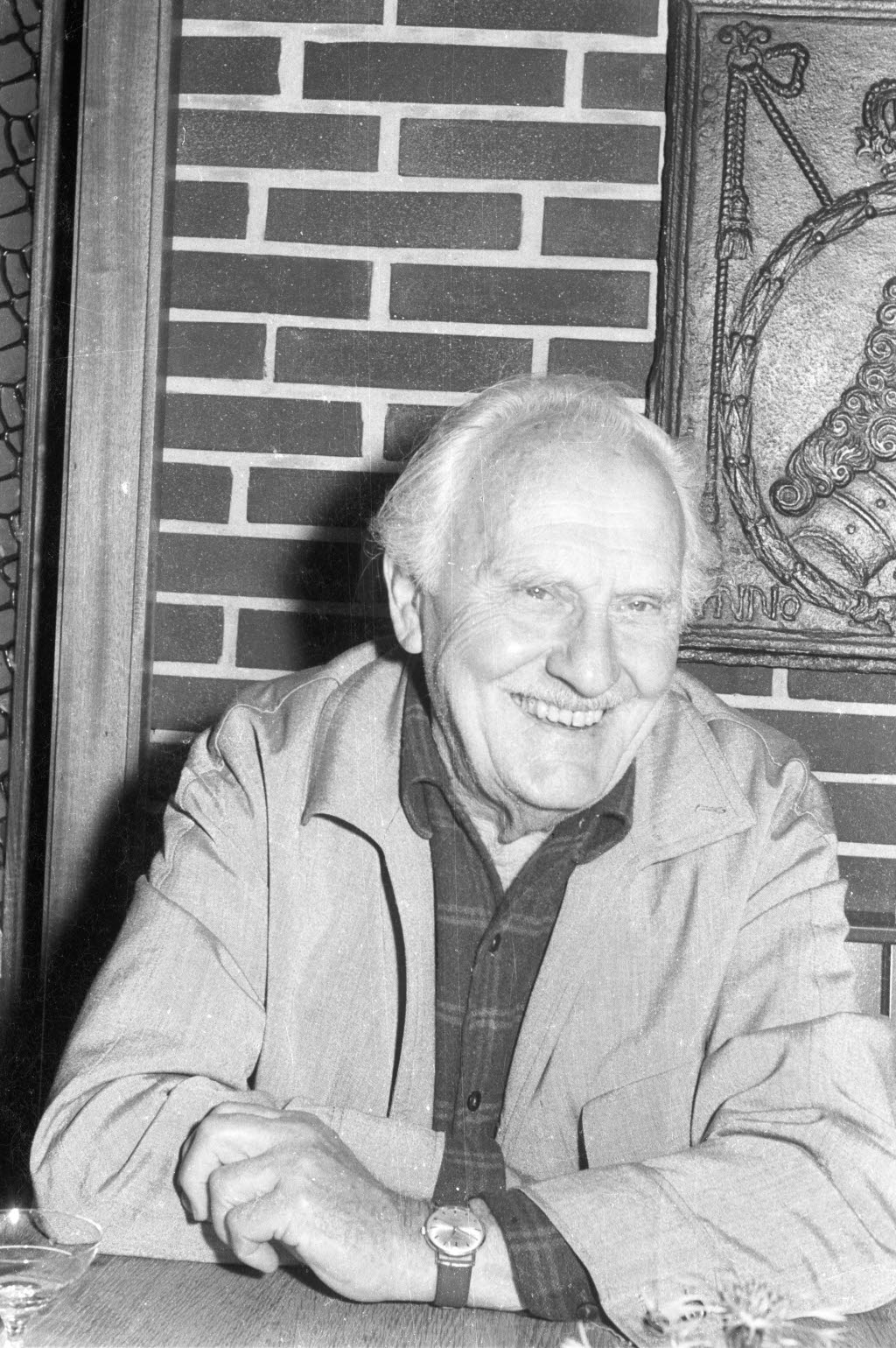
- Voß in 1967
- Born: 29 June 1891; Fiefhusen, Schleswig-Holstein, German Empire
- Died: 9 January 1979 (aged 87); Nortorf, Kiel, West Germany
- Occupation: Film actor
- Years active: 1925–1959

Peter Voß (29 June 1891 – 9 January 1979) was a German film actor. His acting career started in the late 1920s in the last years of the silent film era and continued into the sound era until 1959.

== Partial filmography ==
- Love and Trumpets (1925) - Rekrut Dirmoser
- Struggle for the Matterhorn (1928) - Edward Whymper
- Diane - Die Geschichte einer Pariserin (1929) - Kapitän Rimbaud
- The Jolly Peasant (1929)
- Tracks in the Snow (1929) - Klaus Meill
- Storm of Love (1929) - Matei
- Katharina Knie (1929) - Rothhacker, Gutsbesitzer
- The Ring of the Empress (1930)
- Two Worlds (1930) - Stanislaus (German Version)
- Love's Carnival (1930) - Harold Hofmann - Oberleutnant
- Two Worlds (1930) - Leutnant Stanislaus von Kaminsky
- The Stranger (1931)
- The Night of Decision (1931) - Viktor Boris Sablin
- The Paw (1931) - Propagandachef Gastal
- Sergeant X (1932)
- The Four from Bob 13 (1932) - Baron Plessow
- The Heath Is Green (1932) - Walter - Ein junger Förster
- Death Over Shanghai (1932) - John Baxter
- Schüsse an der Grenze (1933) - Nr. 34
- Ripening Youth (1933) - Studienassesor Dr. Kerner
- The Love Hotel (1933) - Joachim, Kunstmaler
- Mother and Child (1934) - Jürgen
- The Riders of German East Africa (1934) - Englischer Farmer Robert Cresswell
- My Life for Maria Isabella (1935) - Rittmeister Graf Bottenlauben
- Hundred Days (1935) - Wellington
- Anschlag auf Schweda (1935) - Schweda
- Fährmann Maria (1936) - The Man in Black (Death)
- The Adventurer of Paris (1936) - Mitja, Fürst Artamanow
- The Hound of the Baskervilles (1937) - Lord Henry Baskerville
- Alarm in Peking (1937) - Captain Cunningham
- After Midnight (1938) - Petroff
- Sergeant Berry (1938) - Oberst Turner
- Water for Canitoga (1939) - Gilbert Trafford
- A Man Astray (1940) - Sully
- Trenck the Pandur (1940) - Fürst Khevenhüller
- Achtung! Feind hört mit! (1940) - General vom Technischen Amt der Wehrmacht
- Battle Squadron Lützow (1941) - Major Hagen
- Laugh Pagliacci (1943)
- Laugh Bajazzo (1943) - Claudio Lanzoni
- Titanic (1943) - Schiffsarzt (uncredited)
- When the Evening Bells Ring (1951) - Gutsherr von Brenda
- When the Alpine Roses Bloom (1955) - Hotelbesitzer Wernecke
- Darkness Fell on Gotenhafen (1960) - Kapitän Petersen (final film role)
