= Gantillon =

Gantillon is a French surname. Notable people with the surname include:

- Bruno Gantillon (born 1944), French screenwriter and film director
- Simon Gantillon (1887–1961), French screenwriter and playwright
