= The Ring of the Empress =

1930 film

- Directed by: Vladimir Strizhevsky
- Written by: Max Dauthendey (play); Michel Linsky; Vladimir Strizhevsky
- Produced by: Georg Witt
- Starring: Lil Dagover
- Cinematography: Mutz Greenbaum
- Production company: Greenbaum-Film
- Distributed by: Süd-Film
- Release date: 27 January 1930
- Country: Germany
- Languages: Silent; German intertitles

The Ring of the Empress (German: Spielereien einer Kaiserin) is a 1930 German silent film directed by Vladimir Strizhevsky and starring Lil Dagover. It was shot at the Babelsberg Studios in Potsdam. The film's sets were designed by the art director Otto Erdmann and Hans Sohnle.

== Cast ==
In alphabetical order

- Eugen Burg
- Lil Dagover as Catherine I of Russia
- Boris de Fast
- Jaro Fürth
- Nikolai Malikoff
- Sybill Morel
- Alexander Murski
- Vera Pawlowa
- Dimitri Smirnoff as Peter the Great
- Dina Smirnova
- Peter Voß as Alexander Danilovich Menshikov

== Bibliography ==
- Goble, Alan. The Complete Index to Literary Sources in Film. Walter de Gruyter, 1999.
