= Jean Bernard-Luc =

French screenwriter

Jean Bernard-Luc, real name Lucien Boudousse, (Guatemala City, 8 February 1909 – Pontoise (Val-d'Oise), 18 May 1985) was a 20th-century French screenwriter and dialoguist.

== Biography ==
Born in Guatemala, he arrived in France with his parents aged 3. He studied at Gerson, at the lycée Janson-de-Sailly, then in an École supérieure de commerce.

In 1935, he participated to the writing of the film Michel Strogoff, directed by Jacques de Baroncelli. During World War II, he joined the army. Taken prisoner, he managed to escape and enter the zone libre. He would then write many scenarios, including that of Les Cadets de l'océan by Jean Dréville in 1945.

During the 1950s and 1960s, Jean-Luc Bernard wrote many films, some of which obtained a great success. The second part of his career was essentially dedicated to television but also to a new genre, biology-science-fiction novels.

Jean Bernard-Luc died in 1985 at Pontoise, after a long illness.

== Theatre ==
Author

- 1947: L'amour vient en jouant, directed by Pierre-Louis, Théâtre Édouard VII
- 1949: Nuit des hommes, directed by André Barsacq, Théâtre de l'Atelier
- 1950: Le Complexe de Philémon, directed by Christian-Gérard, Théâtre Montparnasse
- 1952: La Feuille de vigne, directed by Pierre Dux, Théâtre de la Madeleine
- 1954: "Carlos et Marguerite" (Christian Gérard) Théâtre de la Madeleine
- 1955: Les Amants novices, directed by Jean Mercure, Théâtre Montparnasse
- 1957: Hibernatus, directed by Georges Vitaly, Théâtre de l'Athénée
- 1964: "Quand épousez-vous ma femme ?" (Jean Le Poulain) (Théâtre du Vaudeville) (in collab. with Jean-Pierre Conty)

Adaptator

- 1955 : La Lune est bleue by Hugh Herbert, directed by Jacques Charon, Théâtre Michel

== Filmography ==
- 1936: Michel Strogoff by Jacques de Baroncelli
- 1936: La Route impériale by Marcel L'Herbier
- 1938: Nights of Princes by Vladimir Strizhevsky
- 1941: Une femme dans la nuit by Edmond T. Greville
- 1942: The Beautiful Adventure by Marc Allégret
- 1942: Don't Shout It from the Rooftops by Jacques Daniel-Norman
- 1942: Les Cadets de l'océan by Jean Dréville
- 1946: The Visitor by Jean Dréville
- 1947: Monsieur Vincent by Maurice Cloche
- 1948: After love by Maurice Tourneur
- 1948: The Genius by Miguel M. Delgado
- 1949: White Paws by Jean Grémillon
- 1949: Doctor Laennec by Maurice Cloche
- 1949: Prelude to Glory by Georges Lacombe
- 1951: Bluebeard by Christian-Jaque
- 1953: The Enchanting Enemy by Claudio Gora
- 1954: Les Amants de la Villa Borghese (Villa Borghese) by Gianni Franciolini
- 1955: Meeting in Paris by Georges Lampin
- 1958: Seventh Heaven by Raymond Bernard
- 1959: Die schöne Lügnerin by Axel von Ambesser
- 1960: The Nabob Affair by Ralph Habib
- 1960: Le Caïd by Bernard Borderie
- 1961: The Three Musketeers by Bernard Borderie
- 1961: Le Tracassin by Alex Joffé
- 1962: La Fayette by Jean Dréville
- 1963: Relaxe-toi chérie by Jean Boyer
- 1964: Requiem pour un caïd by Maurice Cloche
- 1967: Les Cracks by Alex Joffé
- 1969: Hibernatus by Édouard Molinaro
