= Nights of Princes (1930 film) =

1930 film directed by Marcel L'Herbier

- French: Nuits de princes
- Directed by: Marcel L'Herbier
- Written by: Marcel L'Herbier
- Based on: Nights of Princes by Joseph Kessel
- Starring: Gina Manès; Jaque Catelain; Harry Nestor
- Cinematography: Léonce-Henri Burel; Nikolai Toporkoff
- Music by: Michel Michelet
- Production company: Sequana Films
- Distributed by: Films Louis Aubert
- Release date: 4 March 1930
- Running time: 80 minutes
- Country: France
- Language: French

Nights of Princes (French: Nuits de princes) is a 1930 French drama film directed by Marcel L'Herbier and starring Gina Manès, Jaque Catelain and Harry Nestor. It is an adaptation of the 1927 novel of the same title by Joseph Kessel. The story was remade as a 1938 film directed by Vladimir Strizhevsky.

It was shot at the Billancourt Studios in Paris. The film's sets were designed by the art directors Serge Piménoff and Pierre Schild.

== Plot ==
A White Russian woman working as a dancer in a Paris nightclub finds her past returning to haunt her when her husband, an engineer long believed dead in the Russian Civil War, reappears to seek her help.

== Cast ==
- Gina Manès as Helene Vronsky
- Jaque Catelain as Prince Vassia Heridze
- Harry Nestor as Prince Fedor Achkeliani
- Alice Tissot as Mlle. Mesureux
- Dimitri Dimitriev as Anton Irtych
- Alexandre Mihalesco as Stéphane
- Walia Ostermann as Nathalia Vronsky
- Jean Toulout as Admiral Alexeieff
- Nathalie Lissenko as Vera Petrovna
- Kinny Dorlay as young gypsy
- Alex Bernard as Dr. Alexei Barkoff
- André de Schack as Prince Michel Rizine
- G. Clein as Dr. Chouvaloff
- Behrs as Prince Heridze
