= Marina Koshetz =

American opera singer

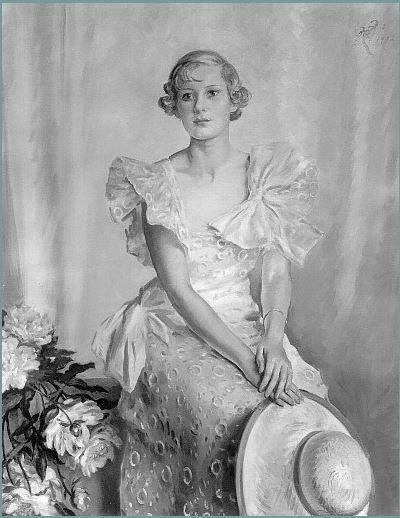
- Marina Koshetz, 1932 (by Ranken)
- Born: August 6, 1912; Moscow
- Died: December 9, 2000 (aged 88); Santa Monica, California, US
- Occupations: Opera singer, actress

Marina Koshetz (August 6, 1912, Moscow – December 9, 2000, Santa Monica, California) was an American opera singer (soprano) and actress. She was the daughter of the prominent singer Nina Koshetz and the actor Alexander von Schubert. She used Marina Schubert as her name for her early film work.

Koshetz sang in staged opera. She also sang in films and wrote a biography about her mother as well as a screenplay about her mother's affair with Rachmaninoff, both titled The Last Love Song.

== Selected filmography ==
- Little Women (1933)
- The Fountain (1934)
- British Agent (1934)
- Millions in the Air (1935)
- Nights of Princes (1938)
- Two Sisters from Boston (1946)
- No Leave, No Love (1946)
- Holiday in Mexico (1946)
- Luxury Liner (1948)
- The Great Caruso (1951)
- Bells Are Ringing (1960)
- Please Don't Eat the Daisies (1960)
- The Glass Cage (1964)
- The Busy Body (1967)
- The Singing Nun (1967)
