= Michel Michelet =

Ukrainian musician and composer (1894–1995)

- Born: July 14, 1894; Kiev, Russian Empire
- Died: December 28, 1995 (aged 101); Los Angeles, California, United States
- Other name: Michel Lévine
- Occupation: Composer
- Years active: 1930–1978

Michel Michelet (June 14, 1893 – December 28, 1995) was a composer of film scores. Born as Mordkhay Khaimovich Levin to a Jewish family in Kyiv (then in the Russian Empire), he moved to Western Europe before settling in France where he became a celebrated composer. He worked on many films during the 1930s following the introduction of sound film. Following the Nazi invasion of France in 1940, he immigrated to the United States where he continued to work on Hollywood productions including several films noir. Later he provided scores for some European films in the post-war era.

He was nominated twice at the 17th Academy Awards for Best Original Score but did not win.

== Selected filmography ==
- Nights of Princes (1930)
- Queen of the Night (1931)
- La Femme d'une nuit (1931)
- That Scoundrel Morin (1932)
- The Abbot Constantine (1933)
- The Faceless Voice (1933)
- The Scandal (1934)
- Skylark (1934)
- Les yeux noirs (1935)
- Compliments of Mister Flow (1936)
- In the Service of the Tsar (1936)
- The Volga Boatman (1936)
- Forty Little Mothers (1936)
- The Lie of Nina Petrovna (1937)
- The Cheat (1937)
- After Midnight (1938)
- Alert in the Mediterranean (1938)
- The Postmaster's Daughter (1938)
- A Foolish Maiden (1938)
- Nights of Princes (1938)
- La Brigade sauvage (1939)
- Serge Panine (1939)
- Personal Column (1939)
- Immediate Call (1939)
- Deputy Eusèbe (1939)
- Savage Brigade (1939)
- The Emigrant (1940)
- Miss Annie Rooney (1942)
- The Crime Doctor's Strangest Case (1943)
- Up in Mabel's Room (1944)
- The Hairy Ape (1944)
- Voice in the Wind (1944)
- Music for Millions (1944)
- The Diary of a Chambermaid (1946)
- The Chase (1946)
- Lured (1947)
- Impact (1949)
- Outpost in Morocco (1949)
- The Man on the Eiffel Tower (1949)
- Siren of Atlantis (1949)
- Once a Thief (1950)
- M (1951)
- Tarzan and the Jungle Queen (1951)
- Fort Algiers (1953)
- The Body Beautiful (1953)
- The Beast from 20,000 Fathoms (1953) [Not used]
- A Missionary (1955)
- Desert Warrior (1957)
- The Tiger of Eschnapur (1959)
- The Indian Tomb (1959)
- Girl from Hong Kong (1961)
- A Queen for Caesar (1962)
- Captain Sindbad (1963)

== Bibliography ==
- Geoff Mayer & Brian McDonnell. Encyclopedia of Film Noir. ABC-CLIO, 2007.
