= After Midnight (1938 film) =

1938 film directed by Carl Hoffmann

- Directed by: Carl Hoffmann
- Written by: Joseph N. Ermolieff; Walter Zerlett-Olfenius
- Based on: Nights of Princes by Joseph Kessel
- Produced by: Herbert Engelsing; Joseph N. Ermolieff
- Starring: Gina Falckenberg; Peter Voß; René Deltgen
- Cinematography: Karl Löb
- Edited by: Carl Forcht
- Music by: Michel Michelet
- Production companies: Ermolieff Films; Tobis Film
- Distributed by: Tobis Film
- Release date: 8 April 1938
- Running time: 78 minutes
- Countries: France; Germany
- Language: German

After Midnight (German: Ab Mitternacht) is a 1938 French-German drama film directed by Carl Hoffmann and starring Gina Falckenberg, Peter Voß and René Deltgen. It was shot as a German-language version of the French film Nights of Princes, produced as a co-production between the French subsidiary of Tobis Film and the producer Joseph N. Ermolieff. Such multiple-language versions were common during the decade. Both films were based on the 1927 novel Nights of Princes by Joseph Kessel.

It was shot at the Epinay Studios in Paris. The film's sets were designed by the art directors Alexandre Lochakoff and Vladimir Meingard.

== Synopsis ==
Helene performs in a Paris nightclub run by White Russian exiles. When her husband, an engineer she believed had died in the Russian Civil War, reappears she tries to assist him. However, this opens her to blackmail by her dancing partner Fedor.

== Cast ==
- Gina Falckenberg as Helene
- Peter Voß as Petroff
- René Deltgen as Fedor
- Marina Shubert as Vera
- Alexander Engel as Wronski
- Hubert von Meyerinck as Ricin
- Nicolas Koline as Schuwaloff
- Eva Tinschmann as Mme. Mesureux
- Katja Bennefeld as Secretary
- Hertha Windschild as Yvette

== Bibliography ==
- Goble, Alan. The Complete Index to Literary Sources in Film. Walter de Gruyter, 1999.
