= Simon Gantillon =

French screenwriter and playwright

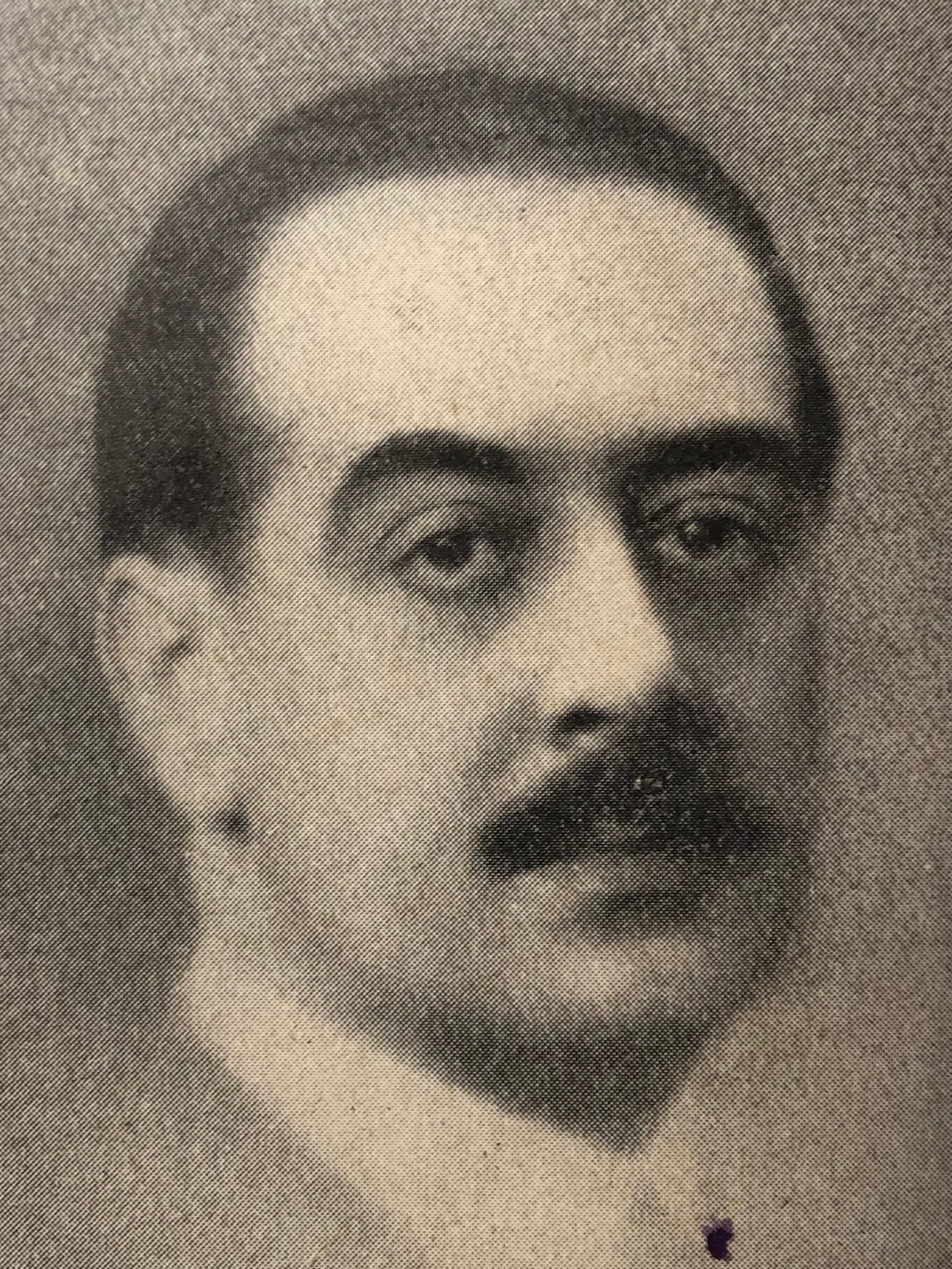
Simon Gantillon portrait

Simon Gantillon (7 January 1887 in Lyon – 9 September 1961 in Neuilly-sur-Seine) was a 20th-century French screenwriter and playwright.

== Filmography ==
Screenwriter

- 1932: Sergeant X by Vladimir Strizhevsky
- 1938: Gibraltar by Fedor Ozep
- 1938: Sirocco by Pierre Chenal
- 1939: Personal Column by Robert Siodmak
- 1945: Mission spéciale by Maurice de Canonge
- 1947: La Figure de proue by Christian Stengel
- 1947: Rumours by Jacques Daroy
- 1947: Love Around the House by Pierre de Hérain (dialoguist only)
- 1947: Lured by Douglas Sirk
- 1949: Maya by Raymond Bernard

== Plays ==
- 1923: Cyclone
- 1924: Maya
- 1928: Départs
- 1931: Bifur
- Mirages
- Fugues
- Iles fortunées
