= Walter Zerlett-Olfenius =

Nazi propaganda filmmaker

Walter Zerlett-Olfenius (7 April 1897 – 18 April 1975) was a German screenwriter, who worked on films for UFA (Universum Film AG), from 1936 until 1945. His most notable project was the 1943 Nazi film about the sinking of the RMS Titanic. The film cost four million Reichsmarks (equivalent to 16 million € 2021).

== Career ==
After attending schools in Hanover and his hometown of Wiesbaden, Zerlett-Olfenius enlisted with the Fusilier Regiment 80 in Wiesbaden at the outbreak of World War I in 1914. He initially served as a cadet, and (as of summer 1915) was a lieutenant in the later course of the war. Because of his language skills (English and French) in the Intelligence Service (NOB) of the General Staff work, after the war ended in 1918, he served briefly in the protection Regiment Greater Berlin.

In the early 1920s, Zerlett-Olfenius studied with the son of the music director at Berlin's Friedrich-Wilhelm University and attended the Graduate School. At the same time, he made his first professional steps in civilian life in the insurance industry. From 1922 to 1924, he worked as general manager and later as a partner in a Berlin factory. After losing his fortune as a purchasing agent for the British company London General Company of Trade, in 1925, Zerlett-Olfenius joined as Secretary General for German Radio Technical Association (DFTV). Serving the DFTV, Zerlett-Olfenius first worked as a writer (The Origin of the Aurora Borealis), created its press releases, wrote pamphlets (DFTV versus radio interference, electricity industry and radio interference) and was involved in radio magazines. 1933/34 Zerlett-Olfenius served as speaker of the Reich Broadcasting Company, but in 1934 finally moved into the film business and worked various jobs (recording and production), along with his brother, screenwriter and director Hans H. Zerlett.

Active as a screenwriter, since 1935, Zerlett-Olfenius fused the first part of his hyphenated familial name – Zerlett (his mother's maiden name – Olfenius, was his father's name), and began a close collaboration with director Herbert Selpin that would last until he had Selpin reported to the Gestapo during the filming of Titanic. Zerlett-Olfenius authored the templates for all common film genres. Particularly successful in his dramatic stories, including two adventure films and a marriage and travel material, and a Nazi propaganda film, all of them were with Hans Albers.

While filming Titanic, Selpin allegedly made disparaging remarks about how the German officers working on the film were molesting female cast members. Zerlett-Olfenius reported this to his close friend, Hans Hinkel, saying Selpin had uttered "vile calumnies and insults German soldiers at the front and front-line officers". Selpin was subsequently arrested and, while Hinkel and the Gestapo were willing to let him off lightly, Zerlett-Olfenius was not. Two days after refusing to recant, Selpin was murdered on the orders of Goebbels and his death ruled a suicide. After this, UFA GmbH (The Nazi Propaganda ministry had by 1942 centralised all German film making) mostly shunned Zerlett-Olfenius and Goebbels even issued a decree threatening to personally investigate and subject anyone who refused to work with Zerlett-Olfenius to the same fate as Selpin.

== Imprisonment and death ==
In August 1947, Zerlett-Olfenius was put on trial for his actions in reporting Selpin to the Gestapo, with pictures taken of Selpin's body used as evidence, and sentenced to five years in a labor camp. Fifty percent of his assets were confiscated. This sentence was revoked in 1949 on appeal. Together with his actress wife, Eva Tinschmann, he retired to Rosshaupten in Bavaria. Zerlett-Olfenius never again worked in the film industry. He died in 1975.

== Filmography ==
Year	Title	Production company	Notes
1936	Skandal um die Fledermaus	Tofa Tonfilm-Fabrikations	Writer.
1936	Spiel an Bord	Neucophon Tonfilm-Produktion	Writer.
1936	Romance (also known as Romanze and Die Frau des anderen)	Patria-Film	Writer.
1937	Alarm in Peking	Minerva-Tonfilm GmbH	Writer.
1938	Nights of Princes	Les Productions I.N. Ermolieff	Screenplay.
1938	After Midnight	Ermolieff Films, Tobis Filmkunst	Writer. Dialogue Director.
1938	Narren im Schnee	Cinephon-Film GmbH	Screenplay.
1939	Wasser für Canitoga	Bavaria Film, Bavaria-Filmkunst	Writer.
1940	A Man Astray	Euphono-Film GmbH, Tobis Filmkunst	Writer.
1940	Trenck the Pandur	Tobis Filmkunst	Writer.
1941	Carl Peters	Bavaria Film, Bavaria-Filmkunst	Writer. Edited into Germany Awake! (1968).
1942	Secret File W.B.1	Writer.	
1943	Titanic	Tobis Filmkunst	Writer.
1943	Die schwache Stunde	Bavaria-Filmkunst	Adaptation.

== Literature ==
- Kay Weniger: Zwischen Bühne und Baracke. Lexikon der verfolgten Theater-, Film- und Musikkünstler 1933 bis 1945. Mit einem Geleitwort von Paul Spiegel. Metropol, Berlin 2008, ISBN 978-3-938690-10-9, p. 435.
