= Sergeant X (1932 film) =

1932 film

- Directed by: Vladimir Strizhevsky
- Written by: Ivan Loukach; Vladimir Strizhevsky; Simon Gantillon
- Produced by: Alexandre Volkoff
- Starring: Ivan Mozzhukhin; Suzy Vernon; Jean Angelo
- Cinematography: Georges Clerc; Nikolai Toporkoff
- Edited by: Léonide Azar
- Music by: Henri Forterre; René Mercier
- Production company: Gloria Film
- Distributed by: Les Films Osso
- Release date: 1 April 1932
- Running time: 87 minutes
- Country: France
- Language: French

Sergeant X (French: Le sergent X) is a 1932 French drama film directed by Vladimir Strizhevsky and starring Ivan Mozzhukhin, Suzy Vernon and Jean Angelo.

The film's sets were designed by the art directors Alexandre Lochakoff and Vladimir Meingard. Many of those involved with the film's production were Russian emigrants. It was remade under the same title in 1960.

== Synopsis ==
An army officer returns home after being believed dead, only to find that his wife has remarried. In order to spare her feelings he enlists in the French Foreign Legion to serve in North Africa.

== Cast ==
- Ivan Mozzhukhin as Jean Renault
- Suzy Vernon as Olga
- Jean Angelo as Chardin
- Suzanne Stanley as Djanni
- Bill Bocket as Christophe
- Léon Courtois as Grégoire
- Nicole de Rouves as Jeanne
- Michel Monda as Georges
- Massazza as Truzzi
- Lars Birbach as Schwartz
- Tukchtiaeff as Shika

== Bibliography ==
- Crisp, Colin. Genre, Myth and Convention in the French Cinema, 1929-1939. Indiana University Press, 2002.
