= Sergeant Berry =

1938 film

- Directed by: Herbert Selpin
- Written by: Rudolf Klein-Rogge; Lotte Neumann; Walter Wassermann
- Produced by: Hans Albers; Franz Vogel
- Starring: Hans Albers; Toni von Bukovics; Peter Voß
- Cinematography: Franz Koch
- Edited by: Lena Neumann
- Music by: Hans Sommer
- Production company: Tobis Film
- Distributed by: Tobis Film
- Release date: 22 December 1938
- Running time: 113 minutes
- Country: Germany
- Language: German

Sergeant Berry is a 1938 German comedy western film directed by Herbert Selpin and starring Hans Albers, Toni von Bukovics and Peter Voß. It was based on a novel by Robert Arden. It was shot at the Bavaria Studios in Munich as well as the Grunewald Studios and Halensee Studios in Berlin. The film's sets were designed by the art director Paul Markwitz, Fritz Maurischat and Arthur Schwarz.

== Synopsis ==
A tough Chicago policeman is sent on a dangerous mission in the Mexican–American border region.

== Cast ==
- Hans Albers as Sergeant Mecki Berry
- Toni von Bukovics as Berry's mother
- Peter Voß as Oberst Turner
- Edwin Jürgensen as Madison
- Gerd Höst as Amely Madison
- Alexander Golling as Evans
- Alexander Engel as Gomez
- Herbert Hübner as Don Antonio de Garcia
- Herma Relin as Ramona
- Werner Scharf as Don José
- Erich Ziegel as Consul Erasmus Smith
- Hanni Weisse as the consul's wife
- Hans Stiebner as Carlo
- Kurt Seifert as Chief of Police Alcalde
- Hertha von Walther as Juanita
- Erich Dunskus as ein Grenzpolizeiinspektor
- Annemarie Schreiner as Zofe Ramonas
- Toni Färber as US-Grenzbeamter
- Friedrich Gnaß as Chicago-Gangsterboss Duffy
- Fred Goebel as Hotel Porter
- Reginald Pasch as Schmuggler Blandy
- Louis Ralph as Gangster
- Arthur Reinhardt as Schmuggler Big
- Arnulf Schröder as Pedro, Alcaldes Assistant
- Heinz Wemper as the chief of the gangster
- Manfred Meurer as Don Antonios Angestellter
- Helmuth Heyne as ein Raufbold
- Jac Diehl as ein Hotelgast
- Mohamed Husen as the Chicago nightclub patron
- Louis Brody as Berry's neighbor

== Bibliography ==
- Hull, David Stewart. Film in the Third Reich: a study of the German cinema, 1933–1945. University of California Press, 1969.
