= Fort Algiers =

1953 film by Lesley Selander

- Theatrical release poster
- Directed by: Lesley Selander
- Screenplay by: Theodore St. John
- Story by: Frederick Stephani
- Produced by: Joseph N. Ermolieff
- Starring: Yvonne De Carlo; Carlos Thompson; Raymond Burr; Leif Erickson; Anthony Caruso; John Dehner; Robert Boon; Henry Corden
- Cinematography: John F. Seitz
- Music by: Michel Michelet
- Production companies: ERCO Productions; Edward L. Alperson Productions
- Distributed by: United Artists
- Release date: July 15, 1953
- Running time: 78 minutes
- Country: United States
- Language: English

Fort Algiers is a 1953 American adventure film directed by Lesley Selander and written by Theodore St John. The film reused action sequences from Outpost in Morocco (1949) and starred Yvonne De Carlo, Carlos Thompson, Raymond Burr, Leif Erickson, Anthony Caruso, John Dehner, Robert Boon and Henry Corden. The film was released on July 15, 1953, by United Artists.

== Plot ==
A female secret agent is sent to French North Africa posing as a night club singer to investigate the massacre of a French Foreign Legion outpost. She discovers a treacherous leader planning an attack on strategic oil fields.

== Cast ==
- Yvonne De Carlo as Yvette
- Carlos Thompson as Jeff
- Raymond Burr as Amir
- Leif Erickson as Kalmani
- Anthony Caruso as Chavez
- John Dehner as Major Colle
- Robert Boon as Mueller
- Henry Corden as Yessouf
- Joe Kirk as Luigi
- Lewis Martin as Colonel Lasalle
- Leonard Penn as Lt. Picard
- William Phipps as Lt. Gerrier
- Michael Couzzi as Richetti
- Charles Evans as General Rousseau
- Sandra Bettin as Sandra
- Robert Warwick as Haroon
- Lee Miller as Yvette's Murdered Brother

== Production ==
In 1952 Yvonne De Carlo announced she and her agent Paul Kohner would form their own production company, Vancouver Productions. They said their first film would be an adventure story which would co star Carlos Thompson, an actor de Carlo met on the set of a movie in South America and recommended him for the male lead.

In November 1952 it was announced the film would be called Fort Courageous and would be made by Atlantic Productions, the company of Joseph Armolieff. It was based on a story by Frederick Stephani and screenplay by Theodore St John. Filming started 15 December 1952. De Carlo said she had her own money in the film.
