= Anton Walbrook =

Austrian actor (1896–1967)

- Born: Adolf Anton Wilhelm Wohlbrück; 19 November 1896; Vienna, Austria-Hungary
- Died: 9 August 1967 (aged 70); Starnberger See, Bavaria, West Germany
- Occupation: Actor
- Years active: 1915–1966

Adolf Anton Wilhelm Wohlbrück (19 November 1896 – 9 August 1967) was an Austrian actor who settled in the United Kingdom under the name Anton Walbrook. A popular performer in Austria and pre-war Germany, he left Germany in 1936 out of concerns for his own safety and established a career in British cinema. Walbrook is perhaps best known for his roles in the original British film of Gaslight, The Life and Death of Colonel Blimp, The Red Shoes and Victoria the Great (as Prince Albert).

== Early life ==
Walbrook was born in Vienna, Austria, as Adolf Wohlbrück. He was the son of Gisela Rosa (Cohn) and Adolf Ferdinand Bernhard Hermann Wohlbrück. He was descended from ten generations of actors, though his father broke with tradition and was a circus clown. He attended a monastery school and considered becoming a monk, but eventually decided to become an actor.

Wohlbrück moved to Berlin to study at the Deutsches Theater under Austro-German director Max Reinhardt. His career was temporarily interrupted by the First World War, during which he was captured in France and spent time in a POW camp.

== Career ==
After the war, Wohlbrück built up a career in German theatre and cinema, with the support of his friend Hermine Körner. In the 1930s he was one of Germany's most popular actors. However, as the Nazis came to power, Wohlbrück realized that he could not stay in Germany for long, as he risked being persecuted by the Nazis due to his Jewish mother and his homosexuality. When Nazi Germany annexed Austria in the 1938 Anschluss, the Austrian option was taken off the table as well.

In 1936, Wohlbrück went to Hollywood to reshoot dialogue for the 1937 multinational The Soldier and the Lady, in which he portrayed the Jules Verne hero Michael Strogoff, and changed his name from Adolf Wohlbrück to Anton Walbrook. Ironically, due in part to his popularity in Germany (which persisted through the early parts of the Nazi regime), some German emigres in Hollywood suspected that he was a Nazi spy, and some Jewish-American groups threatened to boycott his films. Although RKO convinced the Jewish organizations to lift the boycott by pointing out Walbrook's actual ethnic heritage, the damage was done. He moved to London in 1937, settling down in an area with many German-speaking emigres. One of his neighbours was director Emeric Pressburger, who later cast him in some of his most famous roles. He acquired British citizenship in 1947.

In Britain, Walbrook continued working as an actor, specialising in playing continental Europeans. He "steer[ed] away from the dangerously sexy screen persona of his German career to the image of a passionate spokesman for pan-European liberalism." He played Otto in the first London production of Design for Living at the Haymarket Theatre in January 1939 (later transferring to the Savoy Theatre), and running for 233 performances, opposite Diana Wynyard as Gilda and Rex Harrison as Leo. In 1952 he appeared at the Coliseum as Cosmo Constantine in Call Me Madam, also participating alongside Billie Worth, Jeff Warren and Shani Wallis on the EMI cast recording. Producer-director Herbert Wilcox cast him as Prince Albert in Victoria the Great (1937) and its sequel Sixty Glorious Years (1938). In Dangerous Moonlight (1941), a romantic melodrama, he was a Polish pianist torn over whether to return home.

Thorold Dickinson cast Walbrook in Gaslight (1940), in the role played by Charles Boyer in the later Hollywood remake. One of Walbrook's most unusual films was Dickinson's The Queen of Spades (1949), a Gothic thriller based on the Alexander Pushkin short story, in which he co-starred with Edith Evans.

In 1941 Walbrook began collaborating with Michael Powell and Emeric Pressburger, for which he is now best remembered. In 49th Parallel (1941) he played a leader of a Hutterite community in Canada. In The Life and Death of Colonel Blimp (1943) he played the role of the dashing, intense military officer Theo Kretschmar-Schuldorff, a sympathetic German refugee from the Nazi regime. He also portrayed the tyrannical ballet impresario Lermontov in The Red Shoes (1948). His Red Shoes co-star Moira Shearer recalled Walbrook was a loner on set, often wearing dark glasses, as in his character costume in the film, and eating alone.

After the war, he worked in some continental productions, working with Max Ophüls as the ringmaster in La Ronde (1950) and Ludwig I, King of Bavaria in Lola Montès.

Walbrook retired from feature films in 1958 and moved to West Germany, where he worked as a stage and television actor during the 1960s.

== Private life ==
Anton Walbrook was for a short time in a relationship with the painter and graphic artist Ferdinand Finne, whom he had met in 1938 on a train ride in France. The relationship ended in 1946 after Walbrook began an affair with the Englishman Eugene Edwards. Nevertheless, Walbrook set up a flower shop for the man, who was a good thirty years his junior, and continued to remain in contact with him, right up until his death.

== Death ==
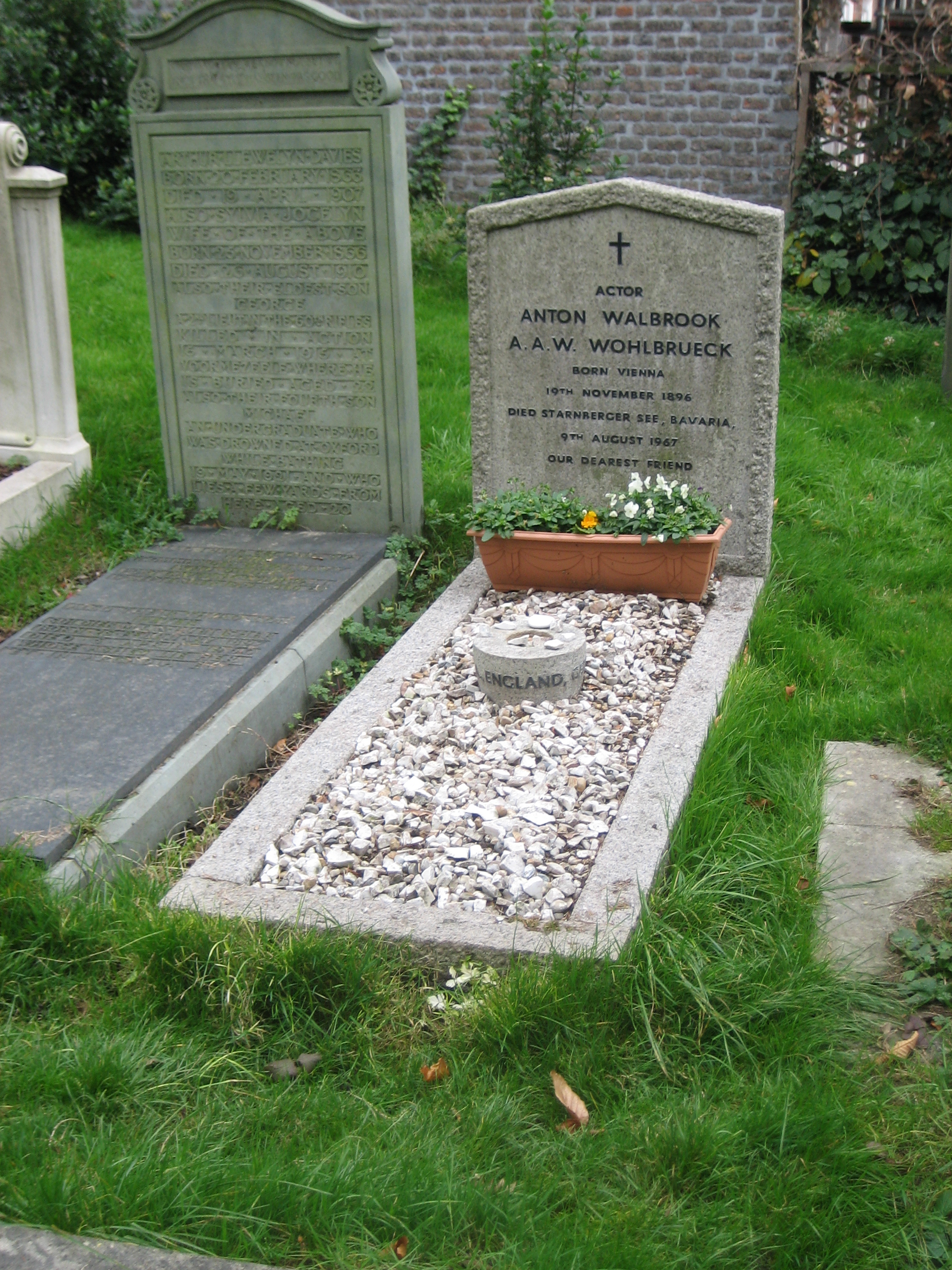
Walbrook's grave in St John-at-Hampstead parish church yard, London

In 1967, Walbrook suffered a heart attack on stage while acting in a theatrical production. He survived but later died at the home of actress Hansi Burg in the Garatshausen district of Feldafing, Bavaria, West Germany. His ashes were interred in the churchyard of St. John's Church, Hampstead, London, as he had wished in his will. He is buried with his partner Eugene Edwards, a London florist, although Edwards' name is not on the tombstone.

A biography, Anton Walbrook: A Life of Masks and Mirrors by James Downs, was published in 2020.

== Legacy ==
American director Wes Anderson is a great fan of The Red Shoes, and once boasted that he knew all of Walbrook's dialogue in that film by heart. Ralph Fiennes, who played the dandyish hotel concierge Gustave H. in Anderson's film The Grand Budapest Hotel, said that Anderson asked him to study Walbrook's work in The Red Shoes to prepare for his performance. In addition, Gustave's mustache is based on Walbrook's.

== Filmography ==
Year	Title	Role	Language	Director	Notes
1915	Marionetten	Zirkusdirektor		Richard Löwenbein	
1923	Martin Luther		Silent	Karl Wüstenhagen	
1924	Mater dolorosa		Silent	Joseph Delmont	
1925	The Secret of Castle Elmshoh	Axel	Silent	Max Obal	
1931	Salto Mortale	Robby	German	E. A. Dupont	
1932	The Pride of Company Three	Prinz Willibald	German	Fred Sauer	
1932	Three from the Unemployment Office	Max Binder	German	Eugen Thiele	
1932	The Five Accursed Gentlemen	Petersen	German	Julien Duvivier	German-language version of a French film
1932	Melody of Love	Kapellmeister	German	Georg Jacoby	
1932	Baby	Lord Cecil	German	Karel Lamač	
1933	Waltz War	Johann Strauss	German	Ludwig Berger	
1933	Keine Angst vor Liebe	Helmut Höfert	German	Hans Steinhoff	
1933	Victor and Victoria	Robert	German	Reinhold Schünzel	
1934	George and Georgette	Robert	French	Reinhold Schünzel, Roger Le Bon	French-language version of Victor and Victoria
1934	The Switched Bride	Charles	German	Karel Lamač	
1934	Maskerade	Ferdinand von Heideneck	German	Willi Forst	
1934	A Woman Who Knows What She Wants	Axel Basse	German	Victor Janson	
1934	The English Marriage	Warwick Brent	German	Reinhold Schünzel	
1935	Regine	Frank Reynold	German	Erich Waschneck	
1935	The Gypsy Baron	Sandor Barinkay	German	Karl Hartl	
1935	Le Baron tzigane	Sandor Barinkay	French	Karl Hartl, Henri Chomette	French-language version of The Gypsy Baron
1935	I Was Jack Mortimer	Fred Sponer	German	Carl Froelich	
1935	The Student of Prague	Balduin	German	Arthur Robison	
1936	The Czar's Courier	Michael Strogoff	German	Richard Eichberg	
1936	Michel Strogoff	Michael Strogoff	French	Richard Eichberg, Jacques de Baroncelli	French-language version of The Czar's Courier
1936	Tomfoolery	Philip	German	Willi Forst	
1936	Port Arthur	Boris Ranewsky	French	Nicolas Farkas	
1936	Port Arthur	Boris Ranewsky	German	Nicolas Farkas	German-language version of Port Arthur
1937	The Soldier and the Lady	Michael Strogoff	English	George Nicholls Jr.	Remake of The Czar's Courier
1937	Victoria the Great	Prince Albert	English	Herbert Wilcox	
1937	The Rat	Jean Boucheron	English	Jack Raymond	
1938	Sixty Glorious Years	Prince Albert	English	Herbert Wilcox	
1940	Gaslight	Paul Mallen/Louis Bauer	English	Thorold Dickinson	
1941	Dangerous Moonlight	Stefan Radetzky	English	Brian Desmond Hurst	
1941	49th Parallel	Peter	English	Powell and Pressburger	
1943	The Life and Death of Colonel Blimp	Theo Kretschmar-Schuldorff	English	Powell and Pressburger	
1945	The Man from Morocco	Karel Langer	English	Mutz Greenbaum	
1948	The Red Shoes	Boris Lermontov	English	Powell and Pressburger	
1949	The Queen of Spades	Capt. Herman Suvorin	English	Thorold Dickinson	
1950	La Ronde	Master of Ceremonies	French	Max Ophüls	
1950	King for One Night	Graf von Lerchenbach	German	Paul May	
1951	Vienna Waltzes	Johann Strauss	German	Emil-Edwin Reinert	
1952	Le Plaisir	Narrator, German version		Max Ophüls	Uncredited
1954	On Trial (L'affaire Maurizius)	Grégoire Waremme	French	Julien Duvivier	
1955	Oh... Rosalinda!!	Dr. Falke	English	Powell and Pressburger	
1955	Lola Montès	King Ludwig I of Bavaria	French	Max Ophüls	
1957	Saint Joan	Cauchon, Bishop of Beauvais	English	Otto Preminger	
1958	I Accuse!	Major Esterhazy	English	José Ferrer	

=== Television (West Germany) ===
Year	TV Show	Role	Notes
1960	Venus Observed	The Duke of Altair	based on Venus Observed
1962	Laura	Waldo Lydecker	based on Laura
1963	The Doctor's Dilemma	Sir Colenso Ridgeon	based on The Doctor's Dilemma
1966	Robert and Elisabeth	Edward Moulton-Barrett	based on Robert and Elizabeth (final film role)
