= Charlotte Thiele =

German actress (1918–2004)

- Born: Carlotta Teresa Margarita Thiele; 6 June 1918; Berlin, Kingdom of Prussia, German Empire
- Died: 6 May 2004 (aged 85); Berlin, Germany
- Occupation: Actress
- Spouses: Wolfgang Wohlgemuth; Branko Buzjak

Charlotte Thiele (6 June 1918 – 6 May 2004) was a German actress.

== Career ==
Thiele was blacklisted in 1944 after spurning the advances of Dr. Joseph Goebbels, having allegedly thrown his gift into the trash. She and her second husband, Croatian diplomat Branko Buzjak, fled to Argentina shortly thereafter. She returned to Germany in 1954 and attempted to revive her career, but was unsuccessful.

== Filmography ==
- Wochenendfriede (1938, Short) as Karla Berghoff
- We Danced Around the World (1939) as Captain-Girl Norma
- A Man Astray (1940) as Ingrid Pattersson
- Ich klage an (1941) as Dr. Barbara Burckhardt
- Titanic (1943) as Lady Astor
- Ein Blick zurück (1944) as Fanny Köhler

== Television ==
- Rheingold Theatre, 1 episode "The Last Tour" (1956), as Julia Stahl

== Bibliography ==
- Bartulin, Nevenko (2013). The Racial Idea in the Independent State of Croatia: Origins and Theory. Leiden: Brill. ISBN 978-90-04-26282-9.
