= The Czar's Courier =

1936 film directed by Richard Eichberg

- German film poster
- German: Der Kurier des Zaren
- Directed by: Richard Eichberg
- Written by: Jules Verne (novel); Hans Kyser
- Produced by: Richard Eichberg; Joseph N. Ermolieff; Pierre O'Connell
- Starring: Anton Walbrook; Lucie Höflich; Maria Andergast
- Cinematography: Ewald Daub; A. O. Weitzenberg
- Edited by: Roger von Norman
- Music by: Hans Sommer
- Production companies: Ermolieff Films; Richard Eichberg-Film
- Distributed by: Tobis Film; Sascha Film (Austria)
- Release date: 7 February 1936
- Country: Germany
- Language: German

The Czar's Courier (German: Der Kurier des Zaren) is a 1936 German historical drama film directed by Richard Eichberg and starring Anton Walbrook, Lucie Höflich, and Maria Andergast. It is an adaptation of Jules Verne's 1876 novel Michael Strogoff.

It was shot at the Johannisthal Studios in Berlin and on location in Bulgaria. The film's sets were designed by the art directors Willi Herrmann and Alfred Bütow. A separate French-language version, Michel Strogoff, was also produced.

== Cast ==
- Anton Walbrook as Lt. Michael Strogoff
- Lucie Höflich as Marfa Strogoff, Michael's mother
- Maria Andergast as Nadja
- Alexander Golling as Iwan Ogareff
- Hilde Hildebrand as Zangara, Ogareff's mistress
- Kurt Vespermann as Alcide Jolivet, French journalist
- Theo Lingen as Harry Blount, British journalist
- Olga Schaub as Mascha, a young gypsy
- Hans Zesch-Ballot as The Czar
- Herbert Hübner as Grand Duke Fedor
- Bernhard Goetzke as Emir Feofar
- Heinz Wemper as Wassili
- Walter Brückner as postmaster
- Else Eismann as old gypsy
- Walter Albrecht as Tartar officer
- Max Rosenhauer as Officer in the train
- Walter von Allwoerden as Russian officer
- Ernst Behmer as Train conductor
- Jens von Hagen as Czarist officer

== See also ==
- The Soldier and the Lady (1937)

== Bibliography ==
- Waldman, Harry (2008). Nazi Films in America, 1933–1942. Jefferson, NC: McFarland & Company. ISBN 978-0786438617.
