= Tracks in the Snow (1929 film) =

1929 film

- Directed by: Willy Reiber
- Written by: Franz Weichenmayr
- Starring: Peter Voß; Ilse Stobrawa; Will Dohm
- Cinematography: Franz Koch
- Music by: Werner Schmidt-Boelcke
- Production company: Münchner Lichtspielkunst
- Distributed by: Bavaria Film
- Release date: 27 July 1929
- Country: Germany
- Languages: Silent; German intertitles

Tracks in the Snow (German: Spuren im Schnee) is a 1929 German silent film directed by Willy Reiber and starring Peter Voß, Ilse Stobrawa and Will Dohm. It was made at the Emelka Studios in Munich The film's sets were designed by the art director Ludwig Reiber.

== Cast ==
- Peter Voß as Klaus Meill
- Ilse Stobrawa as Herta Frank
- Will Dohm as Victor Horn
- Franz Loskarn as Der Obergrenzer
- Hanns Beck-Gaden as Der Freund
- Walter Grüters
