= Troika (1930 film) =

1930 film

- Directed by: Vladimir Strizhevsky
- Written by: Jacus (novel); Michel Linsky; Ilja Salkind
- Produced by: Ilja Salkind; Alfred Sternberg
- Starring: Hans Adalbert Schlettow; Hilde von Stolz; Olga Chekhova
- Cinematography: Nikolai Toporkoff
- Music by: Leo Selinsky
- Production companies: Hisa-Film-Vertrieb; Usunia Produktion
- Distributed by: Bavaria Film
- Release date: 9 April 1930
- Running time: 96 minutes
- Country: Germany
- Language: German

Troika is a 1930 German drama film directed by Vladimir Strizhevsky and starring Hans Adalbert Schlettow, Hilde von Stolz and Olga Chekhova. Originally shot as a silent film, a soundtrack and sound effects were subsequently added.

The film's sets were designed by the art directors Jacek Rotmil and Heinz Fenchel.

== Cast ==
- Hans Adalbert Schlettow as Boris, troika driver
- Hilde von Stolz as Natascha, Boris's wife
- Olga Chekhova as Vera Walowa
- Michael Chekhov as Paschka, village idiot
- Friedrich Gnaß as Stephan, troika driver
- Alexander Polonsky as Nobleman
- Angelo Ferrari as Tenor
- Ernst Paul Hempel as Cavalry Captain
- Boris Alekin as Student
- Edgar Pauly as Geck
- Betty Waid as Mother Superior
- Maria Cebotari as Singer

== Bibliography ==
- Bock, Hans-Michael & Bergfelder, Tim. The Concise Cinegraph: Encyclopaedia of German Cinema. Berghahn Books, 2009.
- Rollberg, Peter. Historical Dictionary of Russian and Soviet Cinema. Scarecrow Press, 2008.
