= The Hound of the Baskervilles (1937 film) =

1937 film

- Directed by: Carl Lamac
- Written by: Carla von Stackelberg
- Based on: The Hound of the Baskervilles by Sir Arthur Conan Doyle
- Produced by: Carl Lamac; Robert Leistenschneider; Anny Ondra
- Starring: Peter Voss; Fritz Odemar; Fritz Rasp
- Cinematography: Willy Winterstein
- Edited by: Ella Ensink
- Music by: Paul Hühn
- Production company: Ondra-Lamac-Film
- Distributed by: Bavaria Film
- Release date: 12 January 1937
- Running time: 82 minutes
- Country: Germany
- Language: German

The Hound of the Baskervilles (German: Der Hund von Baskerville) is a 1937 German mystery film directed by Carl Lamac and starring Peter Voss, Fritz Odemar and Fritz Rasp. It is an adaptation of the 1902 Sherlock Holmes story The Hound of the Baskervilles by Arthur Conan Doyle. It was shot at the Babelsberg Studios in Potsdam and on location at the neo-Gothic Moyland Castle. The film's sets were designed by the art directors Wilhelm Depenau and Karl Vollbrecht.

== Plot ==
For several centuries, Baskerville Castle has been haunted by a spooky dog roaming the moor near the stately home. Its bloodcurdling howl is heard night after night. Lord Charles Baskerville is the latest victim of the ghostly beast. Lured from the property by a mysterious phone call, he is found dead on the moor, having succumbed to a heart attack from fear. However, it turns out that the late Lord was not really the last member of the family. Lord Henry Baskerville, a descendant from an obscure branch of the Baskervilles, unexpectedly arrives to take possession of the castle.

Also staying at the castle is a distant relative of the Baskervilles, Lady Beryl Vendeleure, who originally intended to sell her land and moor to the late Lord. Lord Henry quickly falls in love with her. In order not to let Henry Baskerville become another victim of the ghost dog, executor Dr. Mortimer, family doctor and friend of old Lord Charles, asks the London master detective Sherlock Holmes for help. As a first measure, Holmes sends his faithful companion Dr. Watson to Baskerville Castle to keep a close eye on what is happening. Have the events been orchestrated by the secretive house servant Barrymore, who has been seen returning light signals coming from the moor at night? Or is it possible that the escaped convict who went into hiding on the moor, Barrymore's brother-in-law, is the mastermind? And what about the whimsical butterfly collector Stapleton, a self-confessed nature lover and explorer?

Meanwhile, Holmes has travelled to the area incognito and is following a lead. Telephone calls are made between Baskerville Castle and an unknown party at night, and soon the situation becomes more and more threatening for Henry Baskerville. Preoccupied with his new flame, Beryl, he does not take the warnings too seriously, which almost costs him his life. When cries for help ring out from the moor in the middle of the night, Henry runs there to rescue the woman of his heart who has just been kidnapped. There he is finally confronted with the ferocious dog. At the last moment, Holmes and Watson show up and take out the creepy animal with several gunshots. Stapleton, who is behind the attacks, is pursued by the detectives and flees into the depths of the moor, which swallows him up. Beryl Vendeleure, actually Stapleton's sister and locked up by him, is freed.

== Cast ==
- Peter Voß as Lord Henry Baskerville
- Friedrich Kayßler as Lord Charles Baskerville
- Alice Brandt as Beryl Vendeleure
- Bruno Güttner as Sherlock Holmes
- Siegfried Schürenberg as Sherlock Holmes (voice, uncredited)
- Fritz Odemar as Dr. Watson
- Fritz Rasp as Barrymore
- Lili Schoenborn-Anspach as Elisa, Mrs. Barrymore
- Erich Ponto as Stapleton
- Ernst Rotmund as Dr. Mortimer
- Gertrud Wolle as landlady of Sherlock Holmes
- Paul Rehkopf as convict
- Klaus Pohl as notary
- Ilka Thimm as telephone operator
- Ernst Albert Schaach as hotel manager

== Bibliography ==
- Hardy, Phil, ed. (1997). The BFI Companion to Crime. A&C Black. ISBN 978-0-304-33215-1.
