= Antoinette (film) =

1932 film

- Directed by: Herbert Selpin
- Written by: Jean de Letraz (play); Suzanne Desty (play); Roger Blum (play); Georg C. Klaren; Heinz Goldberg; René Pujol
- Produced by: Alexandre Kamenka
- Starring: Jeanne Boitel; Armand Bernard; Nadine Picard
- Cinematography: Georges Raulet
- Music by: Casimir Oberfeld
- Production companies: Comédies Filmées; Société des Etablissements L. Gaumont
- Distributed by: Gaumont
- Release date: 18 November 1932
- Running time: 80 minutes
- Country: France
- Language: French

Antoinette (French: Conduisez-moi, Madame) is a 1932 French comedy film directed by Herbert Selpin and starring Jeanne Boitel, Armand Bernard and Nadine Picard. It is a remake of the German film Chauffeur Antoinette which was also directed by Selpin. A British version The Love Contract was also produced the same year; that too was directed by Selpin.

== Synopsis ==
After she loses her money through financial investment, a wealthy widow takes a job as a chauffeur for the speculator responsible for her losses. He promises her that if she is a perfect driver for three months he will restore her former estate to her, but throws a number of obstacles in her path.

== Cast ==
- Jeanne Boitel as Antoinette
- Armand Bernard as Émile
- Nadine Picard as Véra de Saurin
- Rolla Norman as André Réville
- Pierre Magnier as Le baron Georges
- Georgé as Pierre
- Jacques Varennes as M. de Saurin
- Henry Bonvallet as M. Dorman
- Jean Sorbier
- Lise Elina
- Manou

== Bibliography ==
- Crisp, Colin. Genre, Myth and Convention in the French Cinema, 1929-1939. Indiana University Press, 2002.
