= Princes of the Night =

1927 novel by Joseph Kessel

- First US edition (1928)
- Author: Joseph Kessel
- Language: French
- Genre: Drama
- Publisher: Macauley (US)
- Publication date: 1927
- Publication place: France
- Media type: Print

Princes of the Night (French: Nuits de princes) is a novel by the writer Joseph Kessel which was originally published in 1927. It is set amongst the community of White Russian exiles in Paris.

== Adaptations ==
The novel has been made into films on three occasions. A 1930 adaptation directed by Marcel L'Herbier and starring Gina Manès. This was remade in 1938 by Vladimir Strizhevsky with Käthe von Nagy in the lead role. A separate German-language version After Midnight was also produced at his time by Carl Hoffmann with Gina Falckenberg appearing.

== Bibliography ==
- Goble, Alan. The Complete Index to Literary Sources in Film. Walter de Gruyter, 1999.
