= A Man Astray =

1940 film

- Directed by: Herbert Selpin
- Written by: Harald G. Petersson; Walter Zerlett-Olfenius
- Based on: Percy auf Abwegen by Hans Zehrer
- Produced by: Franz Vogel
- Starring: Hans Albers; Charlotte Thiele; Hilde Weissner
- Cinematography: Franz Koch
- Edited by: Friedel Buckow
- Music by: Franz Doelle
- Production company: Tobis Film
- Distributed by: Tobis Film
- Release date: 16 February 1940
- Running time: 88 minutes
- Country: Germany
- Language: German

A Man Astray (German: Ein Mann auf Abwegen) is a 1940 German comedy adventure film directed by Herbert Selpin and starring Hans Albers, Charlotte Thiele and Hilde Weissner. The film is an adaptation of the 1938 novel Percy auf Abwegen by Hans Zehrer. The sets were designed by the art directors Paul Markwitz and Fritz Maurischat. Shooting took place at the Halensee Studios in Berlin and the Bavaria Studios in Munich, with additional location shooting around Lake Starnberg in Bavaria. Produced and distributed by Tobis Film, one of Nazi Germany's leading film companies, the film was a financial success. It was remade as the 1963 film A Holiday Like Never Before starring Carlos Thompson and Eva Bartok.

== Synopsis ==
Percival Pattersson, a wealthy Swedish industrialist, disappears one morning without warning, and police suspect a crime. However, his daughter Ingrid and a journalist both suspect he has deliberately vanished and set out to track him down. Pattersson has in fact been laying low incognito but when his daughter approaches, he flees to Geneva posing as the chauffeur of the singer Lisaweta who he has fallen in love with.

== Cast ==
- Hans Albers as Percival Pattersson
- Charlotte Thiele as Ingrid Pattersson
- Hilde Weissner as Lisaweta Iwanowna
- Gustav Waldau as Raymondo Duvallo
- Hilde Sessak as Marcella Duvallo
- Werner Fuetterer as Nils Nilsen
- Peter Voß as Sully
- Herbert Hübner as Meyers
- Werner Scharf as Strakosch, Lisawetas Sekretär
- Gerhard Dammann as Der Wirt in der Taverne
- Charly Berger as Ein Direktionsmitglieder des Patterson-Konzerns
- Fritz Draeger as Ein Tänzer in der Bar
- Angelo Ferrari as Der italienische Chauffeur
- Harry Hardt as Empfangschef im Kasino-Restaurant
- Fritz Hinz-Fabricius as Archibald, Patterssons Diener
- Heinz Förster-Ludwig as Der Chauffeur bei Percy Pattersson
- Christa Dilthey as Die Sekretärin Nils Nilsens
- Alfred Karen as Ein Direktionsmitglied des Patterson-Konzerns
- Karl Junge-Swinburne as Der Schneidermeister der Chauffeuruniform
- Egon Stief as Ein Gast am Eingang der Taverne
- Theodor Thony as Ein Völkerbundabgeordneter
- Gustl Kreusch as Renée, Köchin
- Arthur Reinhardt as Ein Polizist
- Manfred Meurer as Der geohrfeigte Mitarbeiter Nils Nilsens
- Werner Schott as Carlsson, Patterssons Sekretär
- Friedrich Ulmer as Der Kommissar
- Aruth Wartan as Manula, der Chefkoch im Kasinorestaurant

== Bibliography ==
- Giesen, Rolf. The Nosferatu Story: The Seminal Horror Film, Its Predecessors and Its Enduring Legacy. McFarland, 2019.
- Hull, David Stewart. Film in the Third Reich: Art and Propaganda in Nazi Germany, Simon & Schuster, 1973.
- Rentschler, Eric. The Ministry of Illusion: Nazi Cinema and Its Afterlife. Harvard University Press, 1996.
