= We Danced Around the World =

1939 film directed by Karl Anton

- German film poster
- German: Wir tanzen um die Welt
- Directed by: Karl Anton
- Written by: Willy Kollo; Felix von Eckardt
- Produced by: Heinrich Jonen
- Starring: Charlotte Thiele; Irene von Meyendorff; Carola Höhn
- Cinematography: Herbert Körner
- Edited by: René Métain
- Music by: Willy Kollo
- Production company: Tobis Film
- Distributed by: Tobis Film
- Release date: 22 December 1939
- Running time: 96 minutes
- Country: Germany
- Language: German

We Danced Around the World (German: Wir tanzen um die Welt) is a 1939 German musical film directed by Karl Anton and starring Charlotte Thiele, Irene von Meyendorff, and Carola Höhn. It is a backstage musical. The film's sets were designed by Paul Markwitz and Fritz Maurischat.

== Cast ==
- Charlotte Thiele as Captain-Girl Norma
- Irene von Meyendorff as Eva
- Carola Höhn as Sylvia
- Carl Raddatz as Harvey Swington
- Harald Paulsen as Torstone, agent
- Lucie Höflich as Jenny Hill
- Herbert Hübner as Jonny Hester, agency owner
- Ruth Eweler as Margrit
- Charlott Daudert as Olly
- Edith Oß as Reni
- Edith Meinhard as Julika
- Walter Werner as Waldemar
- Hans Stiebner as Steffani
- Rolf Moebius as Herbert
- Erik Ode as friend #1
- Willy Witte as friend #2
- Hubert von Meyerinck as theatre director in Stockholm #2
- Hilla Höfer as Tamara
- Ursula Rothe as Bulli
- Jutta Max as Susi
- Bronislawa Geiger as Dora
- Frede-Marie Dohna as Fitta
- Ludmilla Gorny as Ursula
- Margarete Genske as Violet
- Eva Krauß as Lucie
- Mia Elmenhorst as Mary
- Evelin von Schöning as Lotte
- Victoria Weichmann as Hansi
- Lilo Mylo as Steffi
- Roserinette Lahrmann as Kitty
- Kriemhild Waischwillat as Leni
- Karl Platen as Werner, secretary
- Erich Ziegel as doctor in Copenhagen
- Eduard Bornträger as doctor in Stockholm
- Maria Krahn as mother
- Alfred Haase as theatre director in Stockholm #1
- Karl Junge-Swinburne as theatre director in Copenhagen
- Carl Heinz Peters as commissioner in Paris
- Charly Berger as detective in Paris
- Fritz Eckert as Sekretär von Hester
- Charles Francois as dinner cart waiter
- Aribert Grimmer as Wortführer der Claque
- Fred Köster as colleague von Hester
- Kate Kühl as Ila Caroly
- Heinz Müller as Klavierbegleiter
- Klaus Pohl as Agent in Kopenhagen
- Paul Rehkopf as waiter
- Ernst Rotmund as theatre director
- Gisela Schlüter as Artist at Hester
- Wera Schultz as nurse
- Leo Sloma as guest at the nightclub
