= Josef Pelz von Felinau =

- Born: 24 October 1895; St. Pölten, Austro-Hungarian Empire
- Died: 15 February 1978 (aged 82); West Berlin, West Germany
- Occupation: Writer

Josef Pelz von Felinau (24 October 1895 – 15 February 1978) was an Austrian writer who authored many novels and radio plays. He occasionally worked as a screenwriter. His 1936 novel about the sinking of the RMS Titanic served as the basis for the 1943 German anti-British film Titanic, although some of the claims it was based on have been discredited.

== Selected filmography ==
- Just Once a Great Lady (1934)
- A Day Will Come (1934)
- Love, Death and the Devil (1934)

== Bibliography ==
- Malte Fiebing. TITANIC (1943): Nazi Germany's version of the disaster. 2012.
