= Chauffeur Antoinette =

1932 film

- Directed by: Herbert Selpin
- Written by: Jean de Letraz (play); Suzanne Desty (play); Roger Blum (play); Georg C. Klaren; Heinz Goldberg
- Starring: Charlotte Ander; Hans Adalbert Schlettow; Walter Steinbeck
- Cinematography: Carl Drews
- Music by: Ralph Benatzky
- Production company: Excelsior-Film
- Distributed by: Standard-Filmverleih
- Release date: 15 January 1932
- Running time: 88 minutes
- Country: Germany
- Language: German

Chauffeur Antoinette is a 1932 German comedy film directed by Herbert Selpin and starring Charlotte Ander, Hans Adalbert Schlettow and Walter Steinbeck. It was shot at the Johannisthal Studios in Berlin. The film's sets were designed by the art director Erich Czerwonski. A British remake The Love Contract was produced the same year and a French version Antoinette was also released.

== Synopsis ==
Antoinette, a wealthy young widow, runs into financial difficulties after investing in the stock markets and is forced to sell her villa and car. By chance she encounters William P. Harrison, the speculator responsible for her losses who is now the owner of her house. After she helps fix his car, he offers her a bet. If she can work as his chauffeur for three months without any problems, he will restore her lost fortune to her. In spite of him trying to make things as difficult as possible for her, the two gradually fall in love.

== Cast ==
- Charlotte Ander as Antoinette Peterson
- Hans Adalbert Schlettow as William P. Harrison
- Walter Steinbeck as Dr. Lothar Sauvage
- Georgia Lind as Stephanie, seine Frau
- Ludwig Stössel as Baron Kiesel
- Julius Falkenstein as Hadrian
- Elza Temary
- Harry Halm
- Ernst Behmer
- Bertold Reissig
- Charles Willy Kayser
- Fritz Karchow

== Bibliography ==
- Klaus, Ulrich J. Deutsche Tonfilme: Jahrgang 1932. Klaus-Archiv, 1988.
- Wright, Adrian. Cheer Up!: British Musical Films 1929-1945. The Boydell Press, 2020.
