= Jean de Létraz =

French playwright (1897–1954)

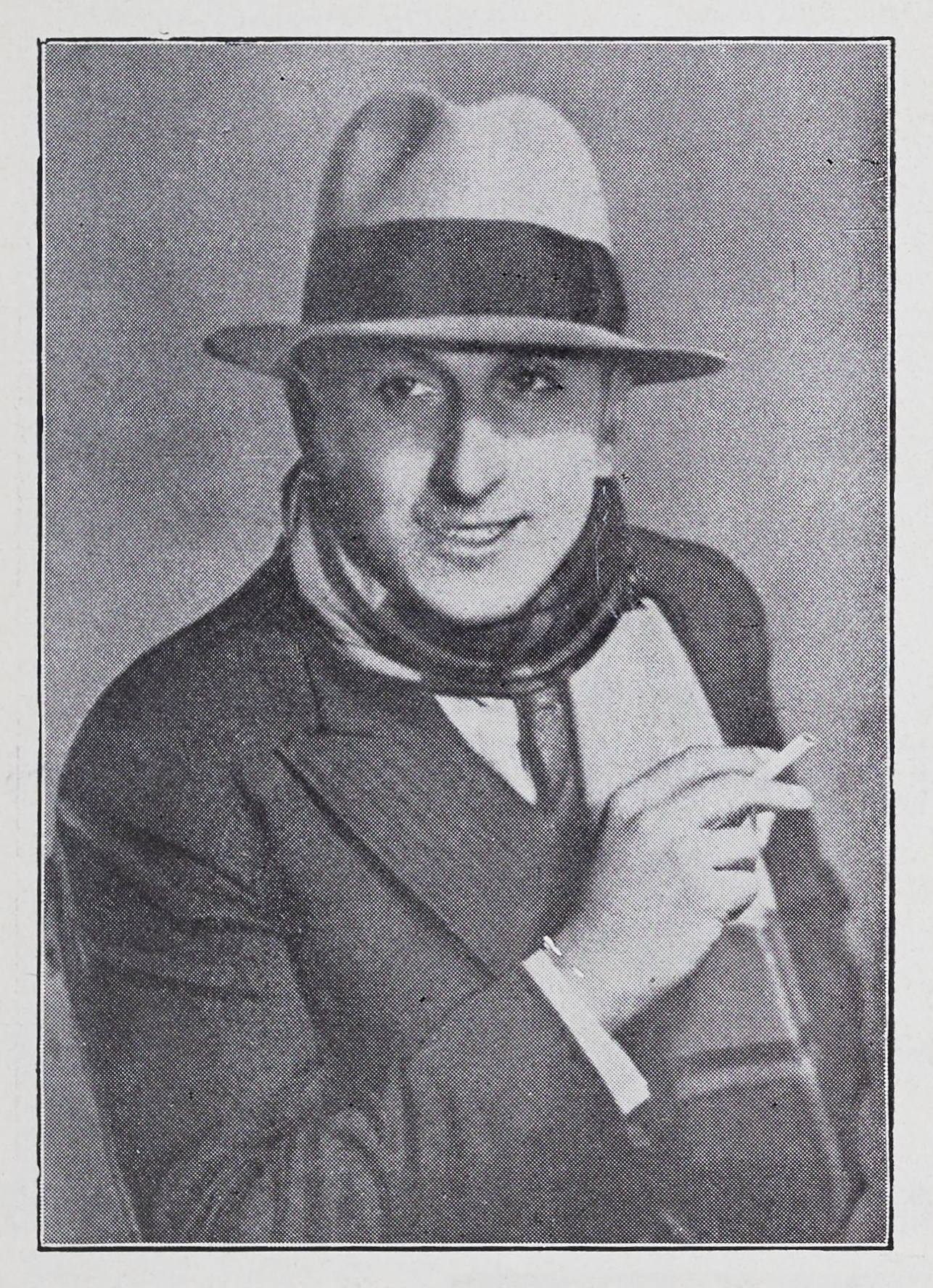
- Born: Jean Félix Deletraz; 23 February 1897; 4th arrondissement of Paris
- Died: 3 June 1954 (aged 57); Rueil-Malmaison
- Other name: Jean De Le Traz
- Occupations: Dramatist, screenwriter, dialoguist

Jean de Létraz, pen name of Jean Félix Deletraz, (23 February 1897 – 3 June 1954) was a French playwright, spécialising in vaudeville, who authored nearly 118 plays, among which the most famous is Bichon written in 1935.

== Biography ==
His first of more than 100 plays was Opium, a one-act play starring Sarah Bernhardt during World War I. As well as Bichon (1935), other popular plays of his included On demande un ménage (1942), Descendez, on vous demande (1946), Moumou (1944) and La Fessée (1936). He was also a screenwriter and a dialoguist. A good number of his plays have been adapted to film.

From 1942 until his death, he was managing director of the Théâtre du Palais-Royal where he directed both his own plays and others. He was also a vice-president of a Paris theatre managers' organization.

His wife, Simone, took over the managing of the theatre up to 1965 and staged some of his posthumous works.

== Novels ==
- Nicole s'éveille (with Suzette Desty, 1926)
- Nicole s'égare (with Suzette Desty, 1926/27)
- Un homme... deux femmes (with Suzette Desty, 1927)
- Douze Nuits d'amour (1927)
- Nicole s'abrite (with Suzette Desty, 1928)
- Un couple passa... (1929)
- La jeune fille et les amants (1930)
- ...tu m'aimes? (1932)

== Works in the theatre ==
=== Adapted ===
- 1931 : Chauffeur Antoinette, comedy in 4 acts by Robert Blum, based on a novel by Jean de Létraz and Suzette Desty

=== Author ===
- 1934 : Mitzi-Moutzou, opérette in 3 acts, Théâtre des Capucines, 31 March
- 1935 : Bichon, three act comedy, Théâtre de la Michodière, 3 May
- 1936 : La Fessée, Théâtre de Paris
- 1939 : La Poule et le chasseur, Théâtre du Palais-Royal
- 1940 : La Familiale, Théâtre de la Michodière with François Périer
- 1942 : On demande un ménage, 3 act comedy, Théâtre du Palais-Royal, 22 October
- 1942 : Le Fantôme de Madame, Théâtre Saint-Georges, November
- 1943 : La Dame de minuit, Apollo, May
- 1943 : Épousez-nous, monsieur, 3 act play, Théâtre Michel, 21 December
- 1944 : Moumou, Théâtre du Palais-Royal, 24 May
- 1946 : Descendez, on vous demande, comedy in 3 acts, Théâtre du Palais-Royal, 16 March
- 1947 : Et vive la liberté, play in 3 acts, Théâtre des Variétés, 19 April
- 1947 : Une nuit chez vous, Madame !, Théâtre du Palais-Royal, 9 May
- 1947 : Chasse gardée, play in 3 acts, Théâtre du Palais-Royal, 9 May
- 1948 : L'Extravagante Théodora, Théâtre des Capucines, 26 May
- 1949 : Le Voyage à trois, Théâtre du Palais-Royal
- 1949 : Nous avons tous fait la même chose, Théâtre de la Potinière, 26 February
- 1950 : Les Femmes de Loth, Théâtre du Palais-Royal, March
- 1951 : Une nuit à Megève, Théâtre Michel, December
- 1952 : Monsieur de Panama, Apollo, 6 December
- 1953 : La Pucelle d'Auteuil, Théâtre du Palais-Royal
- 1955 : Elle est folle, Carole, directed by Simone de Létraz, Théâtre du Palais-Royal

=== Theatre director ===
- 1947 : Et vive la liberté by Jean de Létraz, Théâtre des Variétés
- 1948 : L'Extravagante Théodora by Jean de Létraz, Théâtre des Capucines
- 1949 : Le Voyage à trois by Jean de Létraz, Théâtre du Palais-Royal
- 1953 : Occupe-toi d'mon minimum by Paul Van Stalle, Théâtre du Palais-Royal
- 1953 : La Pucelle d'Auteuil by Jean de Létraz, Théâtre du Palais-Royal
- 1953 : ... La Mariée en a deux ! by Jean de Létraz, Théâtre du Palais-Royal
- 1957 : La Pucelle d'Auteuil by Jean de Létraz, Théâtre de l'Ambigu-Comique
- 1958 : Les Pieds au mur by Jean Guitton, Théâtre du Palais-Royal

Operetta

- La Belle Saison, music by Jean Delettre

== Filmography ==
- Chauffeur Antoinette, directed by Herbert Selpin (German, 1932, based on the play Chauffeur Antoinette)
  - The Love Contract, directed by Herbert Selpin (English, 1932, based on the play Chauffeur Antoinette)
  - Conduisez-moi Madame, directed by Herbert Selpin (French, 1932, based on the play Chauffeur Antoinette)
- Fräulein Liselott, directed by Johannes Guter (German, 1934, based on the play Glück im Haus)
- Bichon, directed by Fernand Rivers (French, 1936, based on the play Bichon)
- Odygdens belöning, directed by Gideon Wahlberg and John Lindlöf (Swedish, 1937, based on the play Bichon)
- La Fessée, directed by Pierre Caron (French, 1937, based on the play La Fessée)
- Papà per una notte, directed by Mario Bonnard (Italian, 1939, based on the play Bichon)
- Bajó un ángel del cielo, directed by Luis César Amadori (Spanish, 1942, based on the play Bichon)
- Frederica, directed by Jean Boyer (French, 1942, based on the play Épousez-nous, Monsieur)
- Adrien, directed by Fernandel (French, 1943, based on a play by Jean de Létraz)
- On demande un ménage, directed by Maurice Cam (French, 1946, based on the play On demande un ménage)
- Bichon, directed by René Jayet (French, 1948, based on the play Bichon)
- Nous avons tous fait la même chose, directed by René Sti (French, 1950, based on the play Nous avons tous fait la même chose)
- Extravagant Theodora, directed by Henri Lepage (French, 1950, based on the play L'Extravagante Théodora)
- Voyage for Three, directed by Jean-Paul Paulin (French, 1950, based on the play Le Voyage à trois)
- Descendez, on vous demande, directed by Jean Laviron (French, 1951, based on the play Descendez, on vous demande)
- Moumou, directed by René Jayet (French, 1951, based on the play Moumou)
- Une nuit à Megève, directed by Raoul André (French, 1953, based on the play Une nuit à Megève)
- Hurra – die Firma hat ein Kind, directed by Hans Richter (German, 1956, based on the play Bichon)

=== Screenwriter ===
- 1931 : Y'en a pas deux comme Angélique, directed by Roger Lion
- 1931 : Le Lit conjugal, directed by Roger Lion
- 1932 : The Triangle of Fire, directed by Edmond T. Gréville
- 1938 : Le Monsieur de cinq heures, directed by Pierre Caron

=== Television ===
- Au théâtre ce soir :
  - 1969 : Bichon
  - 1978 : La Fessée
  - 1979 : Une nuit chez vous Madame
