= Toni von Bukovics =

Austrian actress

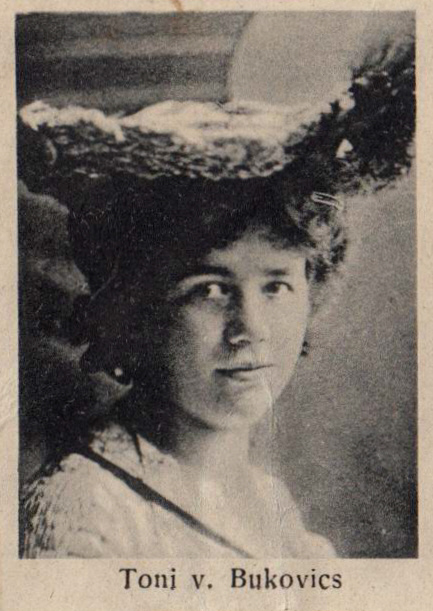
- von Bukovics, c. 1906
- Born: 13 January 1882; Budapest, Austro-Hungarian Empire
- Died: 2 November 1970 (aged 88); Vienna, Austria
- Occupation: Actress
- Years active: 1935–1960 (film)

Toni von Bukovics (13 January 1882 – 2 November 1970) was an Austrian stage and film actress.

== Filmography ==
Year	Title	Role	Notes
1935	Last Stop	Frau Wendler	
1936	Three Girls for Schubert	Haushälterin	
1937	Dangerous Crossing	Frau Scheffler	
1937	Heimweh	Die Frau im Leuchtturm	
1937	Autobus S		
1938	Kleiner Mann – ganz groß!	2. Frau im Zug	
1939	Sergeant Berry	Mutter Berry alias Johanna Brown	
1939	Congo Express	Raoul's Mother	
1941	Carl Peters	Frau Peters, mother	
1942	Much Ado About Nixi		
1942	Sky Hounds	Frau Grundler	
1943	Titanic	Herzogin	Uncredited
1944	The Black Robe	Bawett, Wirtschafterin	
1947	Wiener Melodien	Frau Lowatschek	
1948	Der Prozeß		
1952	Der Mann in der Wanne		
1955	The Blue Danube	Frau des Küfers	
1958	Hallo Taxi		
1958	Sebastian Kneipp		
1959	Herrn Josefs letzte Liebe		
1960	Glocken läuten überall		(final film role)

== Bibliography ==
- Fox, Jo. Film Propaganda in Britain and Nazi Germany: World War II Cinema. Bloomsbury Academic, 2007.
