= Outpost in Morocco =

1949 film by Robert Florey

- Original film poster
- Directed by: Robert Florey
- Screenplay by: Charles Grayson; Paul de Sainte Colombe
- Story by: Joseph N. Ermolieff
- Produced by: Joseph N. Ermolieff
- Starring: George Raft; Marie Windsor; Akim Tamiroff
- Cinematography: Lucien Andriot
- Edited by: George M. Arthur
- Music by: Michel Michelet
- Production company: Moroccan Pictures
- Distributed by: United Artists
- Release dates: March 24, 1949 (New York City); May 2, 1949 (United States)
- Running time: 92 minutes
- Country: United States
- Language: English

Outpost in Morocco is a 1949 American action adventure film directed by Robert Florey, starring George Raft and Marie Windsor. Paul Gerard (Raft), a Moroccan Spahi officer and his French Foreign Legion garrison, holds off attacks from the native tribes of the Emir of Bel-Rashad (Eduard Franz), the father of Cara (Windsor), the woman he loves. As a rarity amongst American films of the Foreign Legion genre, the Legion cooperated with the producers. A second unit led by Robert Rossen filmed scenes in Morocco. Some of the large-scale action scenes of the film were reused in Fort Algiers and Legion of the Doomed.

== Plot summary ==
The full film

Spahi Captain Paul Gerard is assigned to lead a patrol to the city of Bel-Rashad en route to a French Foreign Legion fort. Gerard is to escort the Emir's daughter, Cara, who has been studying in France, to Bel-Rashad that is off limits to Frenchmen and investigate whether there may be anti-French activity in the city. On their ten-day journey Gerard and Cara fall in love. Leaving Cara at Bel-Rashad, Gerard reports to the Legion fort commanded by Commandant Fronval and his executive officer Lieutenant Glysko, a former Cossack.

One night at the Legion outpost, a sentry is shot by a sniper with all agreeing the bullet did not come from a usual musket. Gerard infiltrates Bel-Rashad discovering the locals are being armed with modern Mauser rifles. Detected, Gerard grabs a rifle and fights his way out being hidden by Cara in her room until he makes his escape.

At the Legion fort it is agreed that Gerard must personally inform headquarters of these new developments. Leading a strong patrol back to the fort they discover that the fort has been destroyed with one wall being obliterated and all the Legionnaires are dead. Some of the Legionnaires, including Commandant Fronval, are found bound and executed. Gerard orders a raid of Bel-Rashad in retaliation led by Lt. Glysko to capture the Emir. The Emir is out rallying the tribes but Glysko brings back Cara as a hostage.

As the Legion has no cement, the wall is repaired with mud. The Emir lays siege to the fort, and diverts the river that leads to the fort's water supply with dynamite. Encouraged by his initial victory, the Emir hopes to unite all the tribes against the French. However, due to feelings of loyalty, gratitude or fear, none of the other tribes wish to attack the French. Faced with no water, Gerard plans a breakout and releases Cara. After Glysko prays to God, a rainstorm comes encouraging the garrison but destroying the mud built wall.

After the rain Gerard orders the approach route to the destroyed wall planted with landmines and covered by machine guns that he figures the Emir will use as his route of attack. At dawn the Emir leads his tribe to overrun the fort through the open wall. Cara tries to stop his attack. As Gerard sees her riding into the minefield to see her father, Gerard sadly orders the detonation of the mines and the crossfire to begin that wipes out the Emir, Cara and their tribe.

The film ends with tribal leaders ordering their warriors to lay down their rifles in front of Gerard and his officers, in acknowledgement that order has been restored in Bel-Rashad.

== Cast ==
- George Raft as Capt. Paul Gerard
- Marie Windsor as Cara
- Akim Tamiroff as Lt. Glysko
- John Litel as Col. Pascal
- Ernő Verebes as Bamboule – Gerard's spahi orderly
- Eduard Franz as Emir of Bel-Rashad
- Crane Whitley as Caid Osman
- Damian O'Flynn as Commandant Louis Fronval
- Michael Ansara as Rifle Dispenser (uncredited)
- Ralph Brooks as Nightclub Patron (uncredited)
- John Doucette as Card-playing soldier (uncredited)
- James Nolan as Legionnaire Colonel Pascal's aide (uncredited)
- Suzanne Ridgeway as Nightclub Patron (uncredited)
- Ivan Triesault as Tribal Leader (uncredited)

== Production ==
Outpost in Morocco was originally meant to be made by RKO Pictures in 1939, based on a story by producer Joseph Ermolieff. It was cancelled following the declaration of World War II, leading to Ermolieff suing RKO.

Ermolieff later succeeded in setting up the film with actor George Raft and producer Sam Bischoff, who had just created a company, Star Films, who had produced the film Intrigue. Outpost in Morocco would be their second film. (The company intended to make Mississippi Gambler and a fourth film set in Panama.) It was not a typical film for Raft.

Ermolieff and Star films created the company, Moroccan Films, and obtained finance from Pathe Cinemas of France.

The company got permission to actually film in Morocco using the real Foreign Legion. Raft travelled to Morocco in December 1947 with second unit director Richard Rosson, French-speaking cinematographer Lucien Androit, and French technicians. They spent nearly five months filming battle scenes and chases in Morocco, chiefly around the base at Bal Achard. Raft returned from Morocco in March 1948 with 85,000 feet of film.

The filmmakers spent the next few months sifting through the footage, actually completing the shooting script (the Moroccan footage was filmed on the basis of a long treatment), and finding local locations that matched the Moroccan footage. Interiors were shot later in the year at the Samuel Goldwyn Studio in Los Angeles. Marie Windsor was borrowed from Enterprise Films to play the female lead.

== Reception ==
The film made a reasonable profit.

== Production notes ==
Extras were provided by the French Foreign Legion at Fort Tinihir, made up of some 900 German legionnaires of the remnants of Rommel's vaunted Afrikakorps in French uniform and the Moroccan Spahis Cavalry.
