= Michel Strogoff (1956 film) =

1956 film directed by Carmine Gallone

- Directed by: Carmine Gallone
- Written by: Marc-Gilbert Sauvajon
- Based on: Michel Strogoff by Jules Verne
- Produced by: Emile Natan
- Starring: Curd Jürgens; Geneviève Page; Sylva Koscina
- Cinematography: Robert Lefebvre
- Edited by: Niccolò Lazzari; Armand Ridel
- Music by: Norbert Glanzberg
- Production companies: Illiria Film; Les Films Modernes; Produzione Gallone; Udruzenje Filmskih Umetnika Srbije
- Distributed by: Compagnie Commerciale Française Cinématographique
- Release date: 14 December 1956
- Running time: 111 Minutes
- Countries: France; Italy; West Germany; Yugoslavia
- Language: French
- Box office: 6,920,814 admissions (France)

Michel Strogoff is a 1956 historical adventure film directed by Carmine Gallone and starring Curd Jürgens. It is based on the 1876 novel of the same title by Jules Verne.

Made as a co-production between several European nations, it was shot at the Kosutnjak Studios in Belgrade using CinemaScope. The film's sets were designed by the art directors Léon Barsacq and Vlastimir Gavrik. Jürgens also appeared in a 1961 follow-up The Triumph of Michael Strogoff.

== Synopsis ==
In the nineteenth century, Imperial Russian forces are battling against Tartar forces at the city of Irkutsk. Tsar Alexander II sends Michel Strogoff as a courier to try and reach the besieged city, and he travels disguised as a merchant along with companion Nadia and two war correspondents.

== Cast ==
- Curd Jürgens as Michael Strogoff
- Geneviève Page as Nadia
- Jacques Dacqmine as Grand duke
- Sylva Koscina as Gypsy woman
- Gérard Buhr as Blond
- Jean Parédès as Jolivet
- Valery Inkijinoff as Feofar Khan
- Françoise Fabian as Natko
- Henri Nassiet as Ivan Ogareff
- Sylvie as Marfa Strogoff
- Louis Arbessier as Czar
- Michel Etcheverryas General Krisloff
- Paul Demange as telegraph employee

== Reception ==
It was the most popular movie of the year in France. An estimated seven million spectators passed through the box office to see it in the country.

== Bibliography ==
- Hayward, Susan. French Costume Drama of the 1950s: Fashioning Politics in Film. Intellect Books, 2010.
- Schiltz, Francoise. The Future Revisited: Jules Verne on Screen in 1950s America. Andrews UK Limited, 2012.
