= Michael Strogoff =

1876 novel by Jules Verne

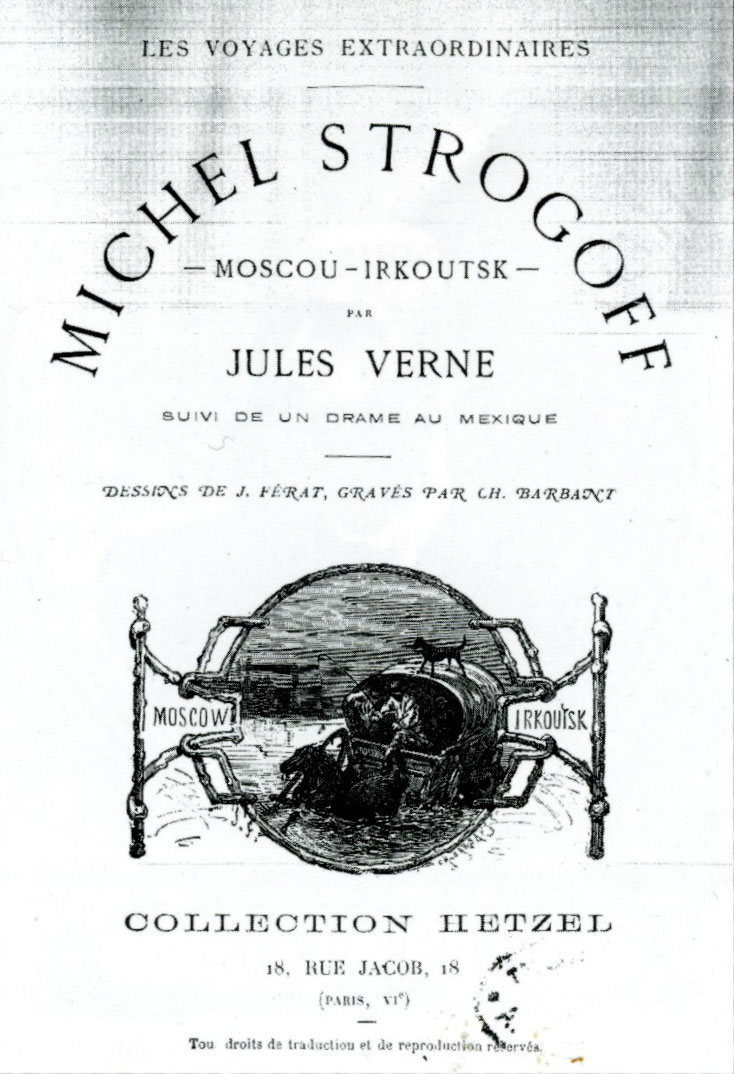
- First edition, 1876
- Author: Jules Verne
- Original title: Michel Strogoff
- Translator: Agnes Kinloch Kingston (published under her husband's name: W. H. G. Kingston)
- Illustrator: Jules Férat
- Language: French
- Series: The Extraordinary Voyages #14
- Genre: Adventure novel
- Publisher: Pierre-Jules Hetzel
- Publication date: 1876
- Publication place: France
- English publication date: 1876
- Media type: Print (Hardback)
- Preceded by: The Survivors of the Chancellor
- Followed by: Off on a Comet

Michael Strogoff: The Courier of the Czar (French: Michel Strogoff) is a novel written by Jules Verne in 1876. Unlike some of Verne's other novels, it is not science fiction, but its plot device is a scientific phenomenon (Leidenfrost effect).

The book was adapted into a play in 1880 by Verne himself and Adolphe d'Ennery. The book has been adapted several times into films, television shows and cartoon series.

Critic Leonard S. Davidow wrote, "Jules Verne has written no better book than this, in fact it is deservedly ranked as one of the most thrilling tales ever written."

== Plot summary ==
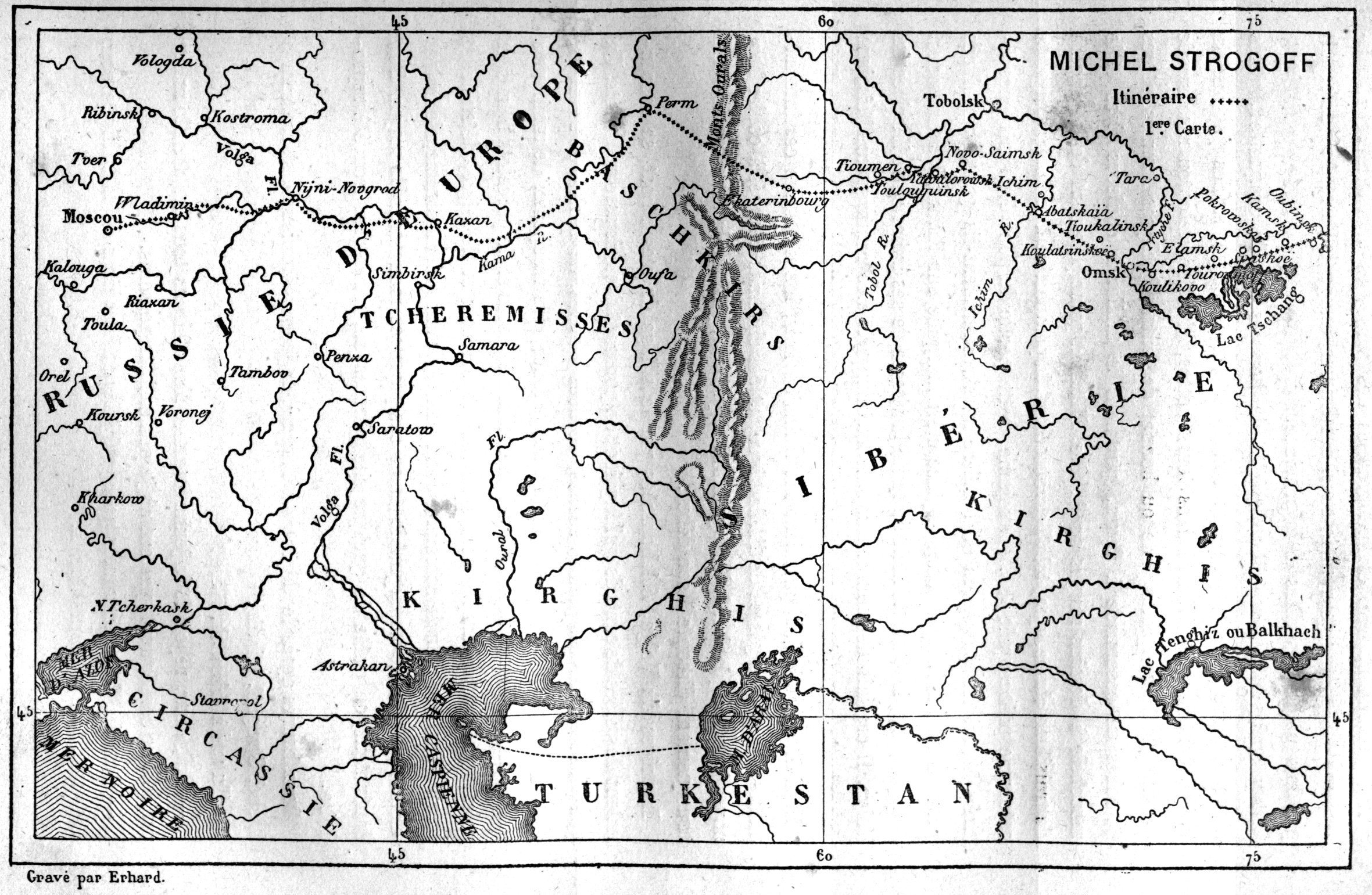

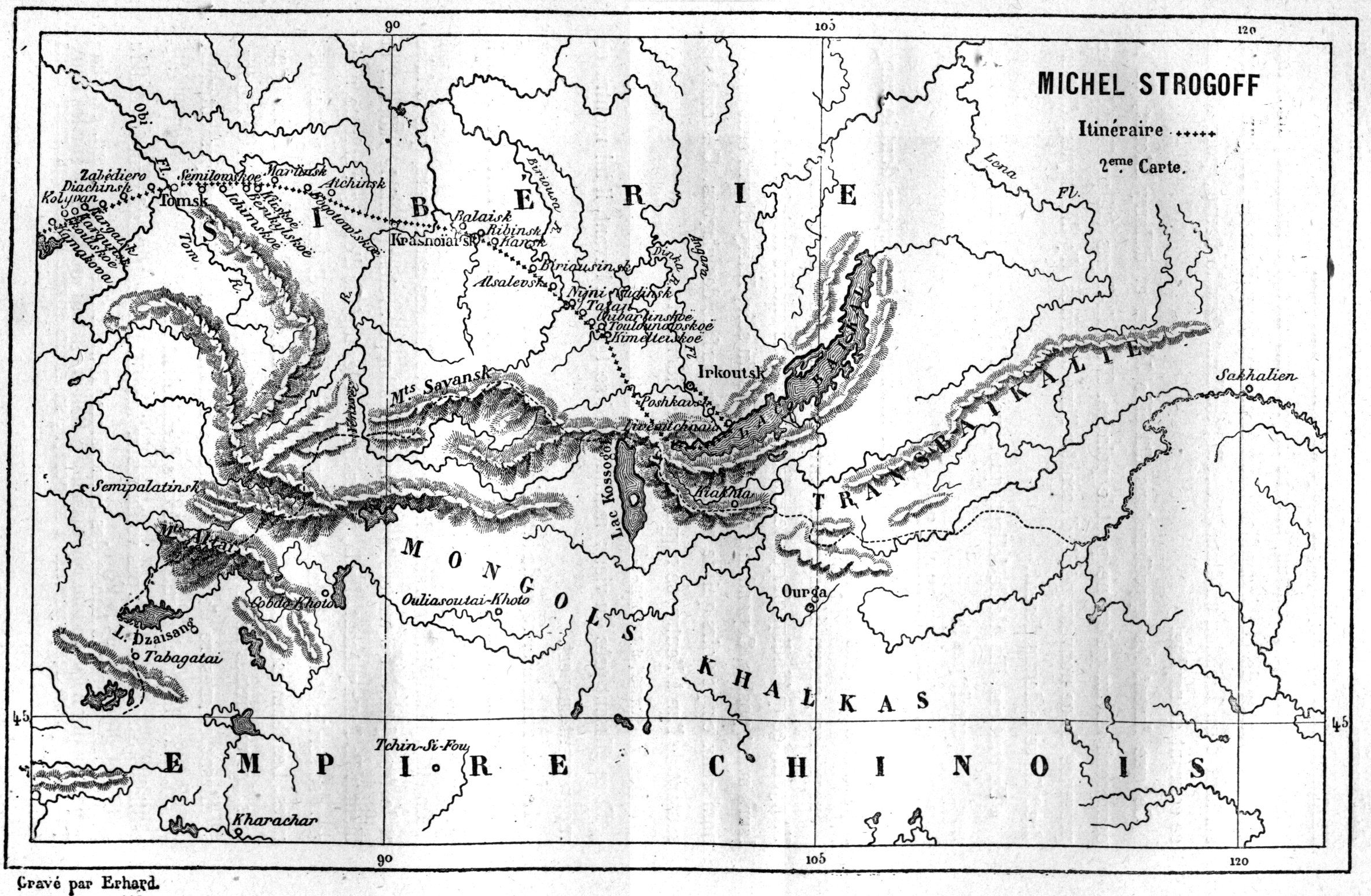
Journey across Siberia

Michael Strogoff, a 30-year-old native of Omsk, is a courier for Tsar Alexander II of Russia. The Tartar khan (prince), Feofar Khan, incites a rebellion and separates the Russian Far East from the mainland, severing telegraph lines. Rebels encircle Irkutsk, where the local governor, a brother of the Tsar, is making a last stand. Strogoff is sent to Irkutsk to warn the governor about the traitor Ivan Ogareff, a former colonel, who was once demoted and exiled by this brother of the Tsar. He now seeks revenge: he intends to gain the governor's trust and then betray him and Irkutsk to the Tartar hordes.

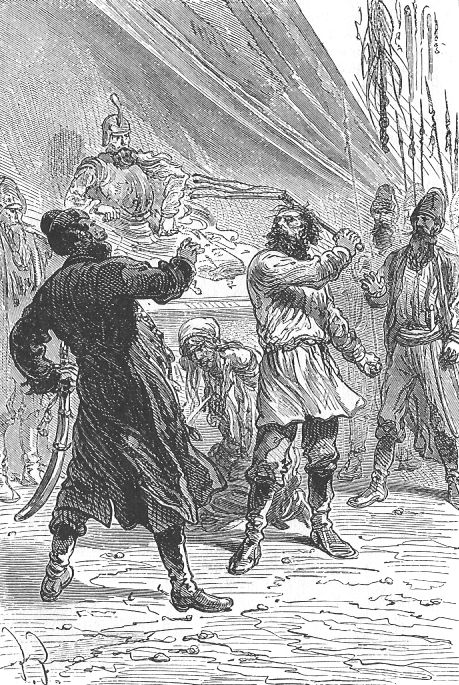
An illustration from the novel Michael Strogoff: The Courier of the Czar drawn by Jules Férat.

On his way to Irkutsk, Strogoff meets Nadia Fedor, daughter of an exiled political prisoner, Basil Fedor, who has been granted permission to join her father at his exile in Irkutsk; the English war correspondent Harry Blount of the Daily Telegraph; and Alcide Jolivet, a Frenchman reporting for his "cousin Madeleine" (presumably, for some unnamed French paper). Blount and Jolivet tend to follow the same route as Michael, separating and meeting again all the way through Siberia. He is supposed to travel under a false identity, posing as the pacific merchant Nicolas Korpanoff, but he is discovered by the Tartars when he meets his mother in their home city of Omsk.

Michael, his mother and Nadia are eventually captured by the Tartar forces, along with thousands of other Russians, during the storming of a city in the Ob River basin. The Tartars do not know Strogoff by sight, but Ogareff is aware of the courier's mission and when he is told that Strogoff's mother spotted her son in the crowd and called his name, but received no reply, he understands that Strogoff is among the captured and devises a scheme to force the mother to indicate him. Strogoff is indeed caught and handed over to the Tartars, and Ogareff alleges that Michael is a spy, hoping to have him put to death in some cruel way. After opening the Koran at random, Feofar decides that Michael will be blinded as punishment in the Tartar fashion, with a glowing hot blade. For several chapters the reader is led to believe that Michael was indeed blinded, but it transpires in fact that he was saved from this fate (his tears at his mother evaporated and saved his corneas) and was only pretending.

Eventually, Michael and Nadia escape, and travel to Irkutsk with a friendly peasant, Nicolas Pigassof. They are recaptured by the Tartars; Nicolas witnesses Nadia cruelly insulted by a Tartar soldier and murders Nadia's assailant. The Tartars then abandon Nadia and Michael and carry Nicolas away, reserving him for a greater punishment. Nadia and Michael later discover him buried up to his neck in the ground; after he dies they bury him hastily and continue onwards with great difficulty. However, they eventually reach Irkutsk, and warn the Tsar's brother in time of Ivan Ogareff. Nadia's father has been appointed commander of a suicide battalion of exiles, who are all pardoned; he joins Nadia and Michael; some days later they are married.

== Sources of information ==
Exact sources of Verne's quite accurate knowledge of contemporary Eastern Siberia remain disputed. One popular version connects it to the novelist's meetings with anarchist Peter Kropotkin; however, Kropotkin arrived in France after Strogoff was published. Another, more likely source could have been Siberian businessman Mikhail Sidorov. Sidorov presented his collection of natural resources, including samples of oil and oil shales from the Ukhta area, together with photographs of Ukhta oil wells, at the 1873 World Exhibition in Vienna, where he could have met Verne. Real-world oil deposits in Lake Baikal region do exist, first discovered in 1902 in Barguzin Bay and Selenge River delta, but they are nowhere near the commercial size depicted by Verne.

Verne's publisher Pierre-Jules Hetzel sent the manuscript of the novel to the Russian writer Ivan Turgenev in August 1875 asking him for his comments on the accuracy of the conditions described in the book.

While the physical description of Siberia is accurate, the Tartar rebellion described was not a rebellion and the strength as well as the geographical reach of the Tartars is highly exaggerated, although there had been one sizeable insurrection under Isatay Taymanuly in 1836–38 and a major uprising against Russia led by Kenesary Kasymuly between 1837 and 1847. After the Khanates had been gradually pushed back further south earlier in the 19th century, between 1865 and 1868 Russia had conquered the weakened Central Asian Uzbek Khanates of Kokand and Bukhara, both located much further south than the cities through which Strogoff travelled in the novel. While there had been a war between Russia and "Tartars" a few years before Jules Verne wrote Michael Strogoff, no Tartar khan at the time was in a position to act as Feofar is described as doing; depicting late 19th-century Tartars as able to face Russians on anything resembling equal terms is an anachronism.

== Adaptations ==
=== Stage adaptations ===
- Michel Strogoff, a 1880 play adapted by Jules Verne and Adolphe d'Ennery. Incidental music to the play was written by Alexandre Artus in 1880 and by Franz von Suppé in 1893.
- La guerra santa, three-act zarzuela by Emilio Arrieta, text by Luis Mariano de Larra and Enrique Pérez Escrich, (Madrid, 1879) is an adaptation of Verne's novel
- Michel Strogoff, musical by Jack Ledru, text by Henri Varna (Paris, 1963)

=== Screen adaptations ===
Title	Year	Country	Director	Strogoff	Notes	Refs
Michael Strogoff	1910	US	J. Searle Dawley	Charles Ogle	silent one-reeler produced by Edison Studios, The Bronx, New York	
Michael Strogoff	1914	US	Lloyd B. Carleton	Jacob P. Adler	silent; the master negatives and initial prints for this screen production burned in the 1914 Lubin vault fire	
Michel Strogoff	1926	France / Germany	Victor Tourjansky	Ivan Mosjoukine	silent	
Michel Strogoff	1936	France	Jacques de Baroncelli, Richard Eichberg	Anton Walbrook		
The Czar's Courier	1936	Germany	Richard Eichberg	Anton Walbrook		
The Soldier and the Lady	1937	US	George Nicholls, Jr.	Anton Walbrook	later released as Michael Strogoff	
Michael Strogoff	1944	Mexico	Miguel M. Delgado	Julián Soler		
Michel Strogoff	1956	France, Italy, West Germany, Yugoslavia	Carmine Gallone	Curd Jürgens		
The Triumph of Michael Strogoff	1961	France, Italy	Victor Tourjansky	Curd Jürgens		
Strogoff	1970	Bulgaria, France, Italy	Eriprando Visconti	John Phillip Law	Released in Germany as Der Kurier des Zaren and in France as Michel Strogoff	
Michel Strogoff	1975	France, Germany, Italy, Hungary, Belgium, Austria, Switzerland	Jean-Pierre Decourt	Raimund Harmstorf	7 episodes (4 in Germany) TV drama	
Michel Strogoff	1998	France	Bruno-René Huchez	Guillaume Orsat	26-episode animated TV series	
Michael Strogoff	1999	Germany, France, Italy	Fabrizio Costa	Paolo Seganti		
Les Aventures extraordinaires de Michel Strogoff	2004	France	Bruno-René Huchez, Alexandre Huchez	Anthony Delon		
Michael Strogoff	2013	Italy			episode of TV series "JV: The Extraordinary Adventures of Jules Verne"; totally divergent plot	

=== Boardgame ===
In 2017, a boardgame was published by Devir Games, designed by Alberto Corral and developed and illustrated by Pedro Soto. In the game, players are couriers racing across Russia to thwart the assassination plot by Count Ivan Ogareff. The game usually ends when a player confronts Ogareff in Irkutsk and a showdown ensues. The game is highly thematic and true to the novel, with artwork that draws on traditional Russian carving techniques from the era.

== Influences ==
The town of Marfa, Texas was named after the character Marfa Strogoff in this novel.

== See also ==
- 1876 in literature

== Sources ==
- Fuks, Igor; Matveychuk, Alexander (2008). Istoki rossiyskoy nefti (Истоки российской нефти) (in Russian). Moscow: Drevlekhranilische. ISBN 978-5-93646-137-8.
- Verne, Jules (1937). "Forward". Classic Romances of Literature: Michel Strogoff. Pennsylvania: Spencer Press.
