= Herbert Selpin =

German film director, film editor, screenwriter (1904–1942

- Born: 29 May 1904; Berlin, Kingdom of Prussia, German Empire
- Died: 1 August 1942 (aged 38); Berlin, Nazi Germany
- Occupations: Film director and screenwriter

Herbert Selpin (29 May 1904 – 1 August 1942) was a German film director, film editor, and screenwriter of light entertainment during the 1930s and 1940s.

He is known for his final film, the partly suppressed 1943 propaganda film Titanic, during the production of which he was arrested by Propaganda Minister Joseph Goebbels. He was later found dead in his prison cell.

== Life and career ==
Herbert Selpin was born on 29 May 1904 in Berlin. After his medical studies in the same city, Selpin worked as a dancer, boxer, librarian, and art seller before he obtained, in the mid-1920s, an internship at the UFA film studios. Among other assignments at UFA, he worked on the set of Friedrich Wilhelm Murnau's Faust (1926).

Selpin was subsequently employed by the European subsidiary of the Fox Film Corporation, where he held several positions, including – in 1927 – that of director's assistant to Walther Ruttmann on the set of Berlin: Sinfonie einer Großstadt.

After several positions as editor, Selpin received an assignment as director for the comedy film Chauffeur Antoinette, released in 1931 by Excelsior Films. In the following two years, Selpin ran into conflict with the Nazi Party for his sympathetic portrayals of the British in his films.

From 1933 onwards, he made propaganda films for the UFA studios, which was by then under the control of Propaganda Minister Joseph Goebbels. After several propaganda films that were not well received (Schwarzhemden in 1933, Die Reiter von Deutsch-Ostafrika in 1934, and Alarm in Peking in 1937), Selpin was successful in 1941 with Carl Peters, an anti-British film. This was followed by another propaganda film Geheimakte W.B.1 in 1941–42.

Selpin was chosen by Goebbels to direct Titanic, intended by Goebbels to be both a blockbuster hit and effective anti-British propaganda. The story of the doomed ship was re-written by Walter Zerlett-Olfenius to put blame on J. Bruce Ismay, chairman of the White Star Line, and his British and American capitalist backers who, according to the screenplay, wanted the ship to make the passage as quickly as possible, no matter what the danger was to the passengers, in order to gain advantage in the line's competition with the Cunard Line, and thereby to make as much money as they could. A German character was also introduced to replace the First Officer who warned about the danger the ship was in by traveling so quickly.

In 1942, on the set of Titanic, after having experienced many time-consuming problems caused by drunk German sailors and soldiers acting as extras for the film, Selpin made several remarks critical of the military. He was denounced for these remarks by Zerlett-Olfenius, once his personal friend, and, upon failing to retract his statements during a meeting with Joseph Goebbels, was arrested on 31 July 1942.

== Death ==
The day after his arrest, Selpin was found dead in his cell, hanging by his trouser suspenders. A rumor circulated that he had been murdered on the orders of Goebbels, as the Gestapo had taken an interest in the matter and Goebbels considered it more prudent to sacrifice the director than spar with the Gestapo. According to the rumor, around midnight on 31 July – 1 August 1942, two guards entered Selpin's cell:

and hanged him from the bars of a ceiling window, using his trouser suspenders as a noose. For the records, Goebbels had the death scene secretly photographed and filed away. He then sent a terse letter to Selpin's wife notifying her of her husband's suicide.

Despite Goebbels's attempt to conceal the truth, Selpin's brutal death quickly spread to Berlin's film colony who were deeply angered at Zerlett-Olfenius. Goebbels retaliated by issuing a proclamation decreeing that anyone shunning the screenwriter would answer to him in person, and be subjected to the same fate as Selpin. It also ordered that Selpin's name not be mentioned on the Titanic set or elsewhere.

The production of Titanic was subsequently completed by Werner Klingler, who was not credited. The film itself – which cost almost four million Reichsmark (equivalent to roughly US$15 million in 2020 terms), although various sources have erroneously propagated an inflation-adjusted figure as high as $180 million – was almost completely suppressed by Goebbels, who worried that the ship's disaster would demoralize the German public. It was shown a few times in occupied countries, and later, in a re-edited version, in East Germany. Four clips from the film wound up in another Titanic film, A Night to Remember.

== Filmography ==
Director

- Chauffeur Antoinette (German-language, 1932) — based on the eponymous play by Jean de Létraz, Suzette Desty, and R. Blum
  - The Love Contract (English-language, 1932) — based on the play Chauffeur Antoinette by Jean de Létraz, Suzette Desty, and R. Blum
  - Antoinette (French-language, 1932) — based on the play Chauffeur Antoinette by Jean de Létraz, Suzette Desty, and R. Blum
- Schwarzhemden (1933) — German-language version of Black Shirt
- Dream of the Rhine (1933)
- Girls of Today (1933) — based on the novel Das Mädchen am Steuerknüppel by Hans Richter
- Between Two Hearts (1934) — based on the novel Ulla die Tochter by Werner Scheff
- The Champion of Pontresina (1934) — based on the novel Der Springer von Pontresina by Hans Richter
- The Riders of German East Africa (1934) — based on the novel Kwa heri by Marie Luise Droop
- An Ideal Husband (1935) — based on the eponymous play by Oscar Wilde
- The Green Domino (German-language, 1935) — based on the novel Der Fall Claasen by Erich Ebermayer
  - The Green Domino (French-language, 1935) — based on the novel Der Fall Claasen by Erich Ebermayer
- Scandal at the Fledermaus (1936)
- Game on Board (1936) — based on the eponymous play by Axel Ivers
- Romance (1936)
- Alarm in Peking (1937)
- The Marriage Swindler (1938) — based on the novel Die rote Mütze by Gertrud von Brockdorff
- I Love You (1938) — based on a play by Roman Niewiarowicz (uncredited)
- Sergeant Berry (1938) — based on the eponymous novel by Robert Arden
- Water for Canitoga (1939) — based on the eponymous play by Hans Rehfisch, Otto Eis and Egon Eis (uncredited)
- A Man Astray (1940) — based on the novel Percy auf Abwegen by Hans Thomas (Hans Zehrer)
- Trenck the Pandur (1940) — based on the eponymous play by O. E. Groh
- Carl Peters (1941)
- Secret File W.B.1 (1942) — based on the novel Der eiserne Seehund by Hans Arthur Thies
- Titanic (after Selpin's death finished by Werner Klingler, 1943)

Editor

- Ariane (1931)
- The Opera Ball (1931)
- A Waltz by Strauss (1931)
- A Night at the Grand Hotel (1931)
- The Marathon Runner (1933)
- Little Man, What Now? (1933)

== See also ==
- List of film directors
- List of German writers
- List of people from Berlin
