= Nights of Princes (1938 film) =

1938 film

- Directed by: Vladimir Strizhevsky
- Written by: Joseph N. Ermolieff; Jean Bernard-Luc; Walter Zerlett-Olfenius
- Based on: Nights of Princes by Joseph Kessel
- Produced by: Georges Courau; Joseph N. Ermolieff; Hans Henkel
- Starring: Käthe von Nagy; Marina Koshetz; Jean Murat
- Cinematography: Fédote Bourgasoff
- Edited by: Carl Forcht
- Music by: Michel Michelet
- Production company: Les Productions I.N. Ermolieff
- Distributed by: Films Sonores Tobis
- Release date: 27 January 1938
- Running time: 92 minutes
- Countries: France; Germany
- Language: French

Nights of Princes (French: Nuits de princes) is a 1938 French-German drama film directed by Vladimir Strizhevsky and starring Käthe von Nagy, Marina Koshetz and Jean Murat. It is based on a 1927 novel of the same title by Joseph Kessel. An earlier adaptation Nights of Princes had been made by Marcel L'Herbier in 1930.

It was shot at the Epinay Studios in Paris. The film's sets were designed by the art directors Alexandre Lochakoff and Vladimir Meingard. A separate German-language version After Midnight was also produced.

== Cast ==
- Käthe von Nagy as Hélène
- Marina Koshetz as Marina
- Jean Murat as Forestier
- Fernand Fabre as Fédor
- Pauline Carton as Mademoiselle Mesureux
- Pierre Alcover as Rizine
- René Lefèvre as Wassili Wronsky
- Pierre Larquey as Chouvaloff

== Bibliography ==
- Goble, Alan. The Complete Index to Literary Sources in Film. Walter de Gruyter, 1999.
