= Michael Strogoff (1944 film) =

1944 film by Miguel M. Delgado

- Spanish: Miguel Strogoff
- Directed by: Miguel M. Delgado
- Written by: Joseph N. Ermolieff; Mauricio Magdaleno
- Based on: Michael Strogoff by Jules Verne
- Produced by: Joseph N. Ermolieff
- Starring: Julián Soler; Lupita Tovar; Julio Villarreal; Anita Blanch
- Cinematography: Alex Phillips
- Edited by: Mario del Río; Alfredo Rosas Priego
- Music by: Rodolfo Halffter
- Production company: Cimesa
- Release date: 8 April 1944
- Running time: 92 minutes
- Country: Mexico
- Language: Spanish

Michael Strogoff (Spanish: Miguel Strogoff) is a 1944 Mexican historical drama film directed by Miguel M. Delgado and starring Julián Soler, Lupita Tovar and Julio Villarreal. It is based on the 1876 Jules Verne novel Michael Strogoff. Numerous adaptations have been made of the story. The film's sets were designed by the art director Manuel Fontanals.

== Main cast ==
- Julián Soler as Miguel Strogoff
- Lupita Tovar as Nadia Fedorova
- Julio Villarreal as Iván Ogareff
- Anita Blanch as Sangarra Petrova
- Andrés Soler as Jolivet
- Miguel Arenas as Czar
- Victoria Argota as Madre de Miguel
- Luis G. Barreiro as Harry Blount
- Charles Stevens as Secuaz de Tártaro
- Salvador Quiroz as Governor
- Francisco Jambrina as General
- Manuel Dondé as Tártaro
- Gerardo del Castillo
- José Torvay as Tártaro
- Conchita Gentil Arcos as Mujer en tren

== Bibliography ==
- Goble, Alan. The Complete Index to Literary Sources in Film. Walter de Gruyter, 1999.
