= Titanic (1943 film) =

1943 German propaganda film

- DVD cover based on the original film poster
- Directed by: Herbert Selpin; Uncredited: Werner Klingler
- Written by: Walter Zerlett-Olfenius; Herbert Selpin; Uncredited: Harald Bratt; Hansi Köck
- Screenplay by: Herbert Selpin; Walter Zerlett-Olfenius
- Based on: Titanic by Josef Pelz von Felinau (uncredited)
- Produced by: Willy Reiber
- Starring: Sybille Schmitz; Hans Nielsen
- Cinematography: Friedl Behn-Grund
- Edited by: Friedel Buckow
- Music by: Werner Eisbrenner
- Production company: Tobis Filmkunst
- Distributed by: Deutsche Filmvertriebs
- Release date: 10 November 1943
- Running time: 88 minutes
- Country: Germany
- Language: German
- Budget: 4 million ℛ︁ℳ︁ (Approximately US$15 million in 2020 terms)

Titanic is a 1943 German propaganda film made during World War II in Berlin by Tobis Productions for UFA, depicting the catastrophic sinking of RMS Titanic in 1912. This was the third German language dramatization of the event, following a silent film released in 1912 just four months after the sinking and the British produced German film Atlantik released in 1929.

The film was conceived by head Tobis story editor Harald Bratt, as a propaganda vehicle depicting British plutocracy being responsible for the disaster, with the addition of an entirely fictional heroic German officer, Petersen, as the moral focus of the film.

The original director, Herbert Selpin, was arrested during production after making disparaging comments about the German army and the war in the east. He was found hanged in prison, and the film was completed by Werner Klingler, who was not credited.

Although the film had a brief theatrical run in parts of German-occupied Europe starting in November 1943, it was not shown within Germany by order of Joseph Goebbels, who feared that it would weaken the German citizenry's morale instead of improving it, as heavy Allied bombing raids made a film depicting mass panic and death unappealing. Goebbels later banned the playing of the film entirely, and it did not have a second run.

The film was the first on the subject which was simply titled Titanic, and the first to combine various fictional characters and subplots with the true events of the sinking; both conventions went on to become a staple of Titanic films.

== Plot ==
At a shareholder meeting, the president of the Line, White Star Line, J. Bruce Ismay (E.F. Fürbringer), reminds stockholders that the share price is falling, and that nothing can be done about it. This prompts many stockholders to sell their shares. Later, at a private meeting with members of the board, Ismay promises to reveal a secret during the maiden voyage of the Line's new RMS Titanic that will change that. He encourages the board to sell their shares so that they can buy it back cheaply when his secret is revealed and the share prices increase again. Later, on the Titanic, it is revealed that he believes that when the ship breaks the speed record, this will raise the stock's value. When Ismay reveals his secret at the opening dinner, the board realizes what he had in mind, and rushes off to the telegraph office to buy shares.

The next morning, the news is not good: Ismay's gamble did not pay off, and the share price is still dropping. He tries to calm the board by saying that the share prices are bound to go up once the Titanic wins the Blue Riband, and tells them that he suspects foul play. Ismay reveals to his fiancé that he had shorted the stock by borrowing millions of pounds privately. In the meantime, the telegraph officer reveals to John Jacob Astor's assistant Hopkins that Ismay had been very eager to learn what the stock prices were, and this makes Astor (Karl Schönböck) realize what Ismay had tried. He decides to set a plan of his own in motion to drive the stock price even lower once they reach New York, in order to obtain a larger share of the Line.

First Officer Petersen (Hans Nielsen), the sole German crew member on board, pleads with Ismay to slow the ship while sailing through ice-infested North Atlantic waters. Ismay refuses and orders Captain Smith (Otto Wernicke) to keep up the vessel's record-breaking speed. An iceberg is sighted, but the search light's filaments break and there are no spare filaments on board. Shortly thereafter, Titanic hits the iceberg and begins to sink. The passengers in First Class act like cowards, while Petersen, his Russian aristocrat ex-lover Sigrid Olinsky (Sybille Schmitz), and several German passengers in steerage behave bravely and with dignity.

With Sigrid's assistance, Petersen manages to rescue many passengers before convincing her to board one of the last lifeboats. He then arranges a seat for Ismay in order for him to stand trial for causing the disaster. As the water ravages through the ship, Petersen finds a young girl who was abandoned in her cabin by her parents. Petersen jumps into the water with the girl in his arms and is pulled aboard Sigrid's lifeboat, where the two are reunited. The occupants then watch in horror as Titanic plunges beneath the waves.

At the British Inquiry into the disaster, Petersen testifies against Ismay, condemning his actions, but Ismay is cleared of all charges and the blame is placed squarely on the deceased Captain Smith's shoulders. As the courtroom empties, an epilogue states: "The deaths of 1,500 people remain un-atoned, an eternal condemnation of England's endless quest for profit."

== Cast ==
=== Fictional characters ===
- Hans Nielsen as First Officer Petersen
- Sybille Schmitz as Sigrid Olinsky
- Kirsten Heiberg as Gloria
- Franz Schafheitlin as Hunderson
- Sepp Rist as Jan
- Monika Burg as Maniküre Heidi
- Jolly Bohnert as Marcia
- Fritz Böttger as Lord Archibald Douglas
- Hermann Brix as Head of Orchestra Franzl Guber
- Lieselott Klinger as Annie
- Theodor Loos as Privy Councillor Bergmann
- Karl Meixner as Hopkins
- Peter Elsholtz as Bobby
- Fritz Genschow as Henry
- Josef Kamper as First Engineer Romain
- Werner Scharf as Cristobal Mendoz
- Just Scheu as Dr. Lorenz
- Georg H. Schnell as Aktionär Morrison
- Hans Schwarz Jr. as Athletischer Kerl
- Walter Steinbeck as Aktionär Fränklin
- Toni von Bukovics as Duchess of Canterville
- Aruth Wartan as Tadrow
- Susi Jera as Unnamed Girl Child

=== Historical characters ===
- E.F. Fürbringer as J. Bruce Ismay
- Karl Schönböck as John Jacob Astor IV
- Charlotte Thiele as Madeleine Astor
- Otto Wernicke as Captain Edward John Smith
- Herbert Tiede as Second Officer Charles Lightoller
- Theo Shall as First Officer William McMaster Murdoch
- Karl Dannemann as Jack Phillips
- Heinz Welzel as Harold Bride
- Kurt Alexander Duma as Second Engineer John Henry Hesketh

== Production ==
The script was adapted from a popular German novel by Josef Pelz von Felinau, although he remained uncredited in the finished film. After the Propaganda Ministry gave final script approval in March 1942, shooting of interior scenes began shortly thereafter at Tobis Film's Johannisthal Studios in Berlin. Beginning in May, 1942, exterior scenes were shot at the German-occupied Polish Baltic Sea port of Gdynia (renamed Gotenhafen), on board SS Cap Arcona, a passenger liner that eventually shared Titanic's fate; it was sunk a few days before the end of World War II by the Royal Air Force on May 3, 1945, with loss of life more than three times than that on the actual Titanic. The ship had been turned into a prison ship and filled with inmates that, according to one hypothesis, the Nazis had put there in hopes that the ship would be destroyed by the Allies. (Note: The British documentary hypothesizes that the inmates were placed onto Cap Arcona as part of a larger plot to hide the living evidence of the concentration camp survivors, and to entrap the Allies into bombing the ship. "Tragically, the SS Cap Arcona was carrying around 5,500 concentration camp inmates at the time, most of whom died in the attack. They were mainly prisoners who had been held in various concentration camps in Germany, and who were being deported as the Allied invasion drew closer. More people died in this disaster than the roughly 1,500 persons who died in the actual Titanic sinking in 1912.") The scenes with the lifeboats were also filmed on the Baltic Sea.

Titanic endured many production difficulties, including a clash of egos, massive creative differences and general war-time frustrations. As filming progressed, more extravagant sets were demanded by Selpin, as well as additional resources from the German Navy – these demands were all approved by Goebbels, despite the mounting costs and the drain on the wartime German economy.

After one week of troubled shooting on Cap Arcona, with Allies bombing raids occurring not far away, Herbert Selpin called a crisis meeting where he made unflattering comments about the Kriegsmarine officers who were supposed to be marine consultants for the film, but were more interested in molesting female cast members. Selpin's close friend and the co-writer of the script, Walter Zerlett-Olfenius, reported him to the Gestapo, and Selpin was promptly arrested and personally questioned by Joseph Goebbels, who was the driving force behind the Titanic project. Selpin, however, did not retract his statement – infuriating Goebbels, since the Propaganda Minister had personally chosen Selpin to direct his propaganda epic. Within 24 hours of his arrest, Selpin was found hanged in his jail cell, which was ruled a suicide. It has been claimed that Selpin was killed on Goebbels' orders. The cast and crew were angered by Selpin's death and attempted to retaliate, but Goebbels countered them by issuing a proclamation stating that anyone who shunned Zerlett-Olfenius, who had reported Selpin, would answer to him personally. The unfinished film, on which the production costs were spiralling wildly out of control, was in the end completed by an uncredited Werner Klingler.

The film cost almost 4 million ℛ︁ℳ︁ (equivalent to roughly US$15 million in 2020 terms), although various sources have erroneously propagated an inflation-adjusted figure as high as $180 million. Regardless, it was the most expensive German production to that point.

== Themes and propaganda context ==
The faults of capitalism and the stock market play a dominant role throughout the film. Titanic makes the allegory of the liner's loss specifically about British "avarice" rather than, as most retellings do, about "hubris". To further this aim, scenes depicting John Jacob Astor IV changed his nationality from American to British, allowing him to be portrayed as a corrupt and cowardly aristocrat. This fits in with other works of anti-British propaganda of the time such as The Maiden Joanna (1935), The Heart of a Queen (1940), The Fox of Glenarvon (1940), Uncle Krüger (1941), and My Life for Ireland (1941).

The epilogue at the end of the film unambiguously underscored the intent of the filmmakers:

"Der Tod von 1500 Menschen blieb ungesühnt, eine ewige Anklage gegen Englands Gewinnsucht."
("The deaths of 1,500 people remain un-atoned, an eternal condemnation of England's endless quest for profit.")

Undermining the intended effect were the scenes of British and French passengers in a state of panic and desperation. Scenes of steerage passengers separated by crew members and desperately searching for their loved ones through locked gates and a chain link fence bore an uncanny resemblance to what was happening in German extermination camps during that time. This contributed to the film being banned by Goebbels inside Germany.

== Reception ==
Titanic was to premiere in early 1943, but the theatre that housed the answer print was bombed by Royal Air Force planes the night before. The film went on to have a respectable premiere in Paris in November 1943 "where it was surprisingly well-received by its audience", and also played well in some other capital cities of Nazi-occupied Europe such as Prague. However, Goebbels banned its playing in Germany altogether, stating that the German people – who were at that point going through almost nightly Allied bombing raids – were less than enthusiastic about seeing a film that portrayed mass death and panic. The Nazi leadership was also displeased with the manner in which the fictional character Petersen critiqued his superiors, which they regarded to be at odds with the Führerprinzip, which demanded Germans unquestioningly obey the orders of their superiors.

It was approved by the West German Board of Voluntary Film Censorship (FSK), but banned after British objections to the film. The FSK approved the film for release in the American occupation zone on 19 December 1949, and the entirety of West Germany on 21 March 1950. The British requested the Allied High Commission to have the film banned, but this was ignored and Britain's Deputy High Commissioner believed that it did not threaten the United Kingdom's security or prestige. On 29 March, it was banned in the British occupation zone after domestic British controversy about the film's rerelease. Süd Verleih, the film's distributor, argued that its version, which was cut down from 2700 metres to 2339 metres, was not prejudicial to the prestige and security of the British Occupation authorities".

== Legacy ==
=== A Night to Remember ===
Three sequences from Titanic were reused in the British film A Night to Remember (1958) without credit.

=== In popular culture ===
- The entire film was screened at the BFI Southbank in London as a part of its "Titanic" season in April 2012.
- Nazi Titanic: Revealed is a documentary on the film which was aired on Channel 5 in the UK on 6 March 2012. An extended version was also broadcast on the History Channel in North America under the title Nazi Titanic on April 14, 2012, and subsequently on the Military History Channel at various times since, including on April 15, 2018, marking the 106th anniversary of the ship's sinking.
- Clips from the film are shown, and the film is discussed, in the 2017 documentary Hitler's Hollywood, on the Nazi film industry.

== See also ==
- List of films about the RMS Titanic
- Hotel Sacher (A similar Nazi propaganda film from 1939, also starring Sybille Schmitz as a Russian socialite)
- List of Nazi propaganda films
- Nazism and cinema

== Works cited ==
- Kelson, John (1996). Catalogue of Forbidden German Feature and Short Film Productions held in Zonal Film Archives of Film Section, Information Services Division, Control Commission for Germany, (BE) (2 ed.). Greenwood Publishing Group. ISBN 0948911190.
- Hull, David (1969). Film in the Third Reich: Art and Propaganda in Nazi Germany. Simon & Schuster. SBN 671214861.
- Romani, Cinzia (1992). Tainted Goddesses: Female Film Stars of the Third Reich. New York: Sarpedon. ISBN 0-9627613-1-1.
