= The Love Contract =

1932 film

- Winifred Shotter and Owen Nares
- Directed by: Herbert Selpin
- Written by: Jean de Létraz (play); Suzette Desty (play); Roger Blum (play); Georg C. Klaren; Heinz Goldberg
- Produced by: Herbert Wilcox
- Starring: Winifred Shotter; Owen Nares; Sunday Wilshin; Miles Malleson
- Cinematography: Cyril Bristow
- Music by: Ralph Benatzky
- Production company: British and Dominions Film Corporation
- Distributed by: Woolf & Freedman Film Service
- Release date: 28 July 1932
- Running time: 80 minutes
- Country: United Kingdom
- Language: English

The Love Contract is a 1932 British musical film directed by Herbert Selpin and starring Winifred Shotter, Owen Nares and Sunday Wilshin. The screenplay concerns a young woman who becomes the driver of a wealthy stockbroker who lost her family's savings. It was based on a play by Jean de Letraz, Suzette Desty and Roger Blum. It was produced by Herbert Wilcox's company British & Dominions Film Corporation. Alternate language versions were made in French (Conduisez-moi Madame) and in German (Chauffeur Antoinette), both of which were also directed by Selpin.

== Cast ==
- Winifred Shotter as Antoinette
- Owen Nares as Neville Cardington
- Sunday Wilshin as Mrs. Savage
- Miles Malleson as Peters
- Gibb McLaughlin as Hodge
- Spencer Trevor as Mr. Savage
- Frank Harvey as Bank Manager
- Cosmo Kyrle Bellew as Sir George

== Bibliography ==
- Sutton, David R. A chorus of raspberries: British film comedy 1929-1939. University of Exeter Press, 2000.
