= Michel Strogoff (1936 film) =

1936 film directed by Jacques de Baroncelli & Richard Eichberg

- Theatrical film poster
- Directed by: Jacques de Baroncelli; Richard Eichberg
- Written by: Jean Bernard-Luc; Hans Kyser; Jacques Natanson; T. H. Robert
- Based on: Michael Strogoff by Jules Verne
- Produced by: Joseph N. Ermolieff
- Starring: Anton Walbrook; Colette Darfeuil; Armand Bernard
- Cinematography: Ewald Daub; A. O. Weitzenberg
- Edited by: Jean Delannoy
- Music by: Hans Sommer
- Production company: Les Productions Ermolieff
- Distributed by: Films Sonores Tobis
- Release date: 10 March 1936
- Running time: 100 minutes
- Country: France
- Language: French

Michel Strogoff is a 1936 French historical adventure film directed by Jacques de Baroncelli and Richard Eichberg and starring Anton Walbrook, Colette Darfeuil and Armand Bernard. It is an adaptation of the 1876 novel Michael Strogoff by Jules Verne. A separate German version The Czar's Courier was also made.

The film's sets were designed by the art director Alexandre Lochakoff. It was made by the French subsidiary of Tobis Film and shot at the Epinay Studios in Paris and the Johannisthal Studios in Berlin. Location shooting took place mainly in Bulgaria and at the Johannisthal Air Field.

== Cast ==
- Anton Walbrook as Michel Strogoff
- Colette Darfeuil as Sangarre
- Armand Bernard as Harry Blount
- Charles Vanel as Ivan Ogareff
- Yvette Lebon as Nadia Fédor
- Marcelle Worms as Marfa
- Fernand Charpin as Alcide Jolivet
- Victor Vina as Czar
- Camille Bert as Grand Duke
- Bernhard Goetzke as Feofar Khan
- René Stern as General Kirsanoff
- Bill Bocket as Wassily
