= Joseph N. Ermolieff =

Russian-born film producer

- Born: 24 March 1889; Moscow, Russian Empire
- Died: 20 February 1962 (aged 72); Los Angeles, California; United States
- Occupation: Producer
- Years active: 1916-1953

Joseph N. Ermolieff (Russian: Иосиф Николаевич Ермольев, romanized: Iosif Nikolayevich Yermolyev, 1889–1962) was a Russian-born film producer. Ermolieff was a prominent figure in early Russian cinema during the Imperial era, owning large studios in Yalta and Moscow. He fled to France following the Russian Revolution and became an established producer there, founding the company Films Albatros. As well as Paris he also worked at the Emelka Studios in Munich. In 1936 he enjoyed a major international success with The Czar's Courier, and he moved to the United States the following year planning to remake the film in English. He settled in America and became a citizen in 1942, but struggled to establish himself in Hollywood despite producing occasional films such as Outpost in Morocco (1949) and Fort Algiers (1953). In 1944 he produced a Mexican version of Michael Strogoff (1944).

== Selected filmography ==
- The Queen of Spades (1916)
- Chess of Life (1916)
- Father Sergius (1917)
- Taras Bulba (1924)
- Passport 13.444 (1931)
- Kiss Me (1932)
- Let's Touch Wood (1933)
- Chourinette (1934)
- Michel Strogoff (1936)
- The Czar's Courier (1936)
- Nights of Princes (1938)
- After Midnight (1938)
- Michael Strogoff (1944)
- Outpost in Morocco (1949)
- Fort Algiers (1953)

== Bibliography ==
- Kohner, Pancho. Lupita Tovar the Sweetheart of México: A Memoir. Xlibris Corporation, 2011.
