= Vladimir Strizhevsky =

Russian film director, actor and screenwriter

- Born: 1892; Russian Empire
- Died: 1977 (aged 84–85)
- Occupations: Director, Screenwriter, Actor
- Years active: 1917-1945 (film)

Vladimir Strizhevsky (1892–1977) was an actor, screenwriter and film director. He was born in the Russian Empire and later emigrated to France and Germany, where he worked for Joseph N. Ermolieff's Films Albatros and collaborated often with other Russian exiles.

== Selected filmography ==
- The House of Mystery (1923)
- Taras Bulba (1924)
- The Adjutant of the Czar (1929)
- The Ring of the Empress (1930)
- Troika (1930)
- Sergeant X (1932)
- Crime and Punishment (1935)
- The Volga Boatman (1936)
- Nights of Princes (1938)

== Bibliography ==
- Geoffrey Nowell-Smith. The Oxford History of World Cinema. Oxford University Press, 1996.
