= Dr. Knock (disambiguation) =

Dr. Knock is the common English title of the play Knock ou le Triomphe de la médecine by Jules Romains of France. Other uses include adaptations of this play:

- D. Knock, a 1938 British television series
- Dr. Knock (1951 film), a French comedy film
- Dr. Knock (2017 film), French comedy film
