= Raffles, the Amateur Cracksman =

Raffles, the Amateur Cracksman may refer to:

- Raffles, the Amateur Cracksman (play), from 1903
- Raffles, the Amateur Cracksman (1917 film), starring John Barrymore
- Raffles, the Amateur Cracksman (1925 film), starring House Peters
