= Knock (1925 film) =

1925 film

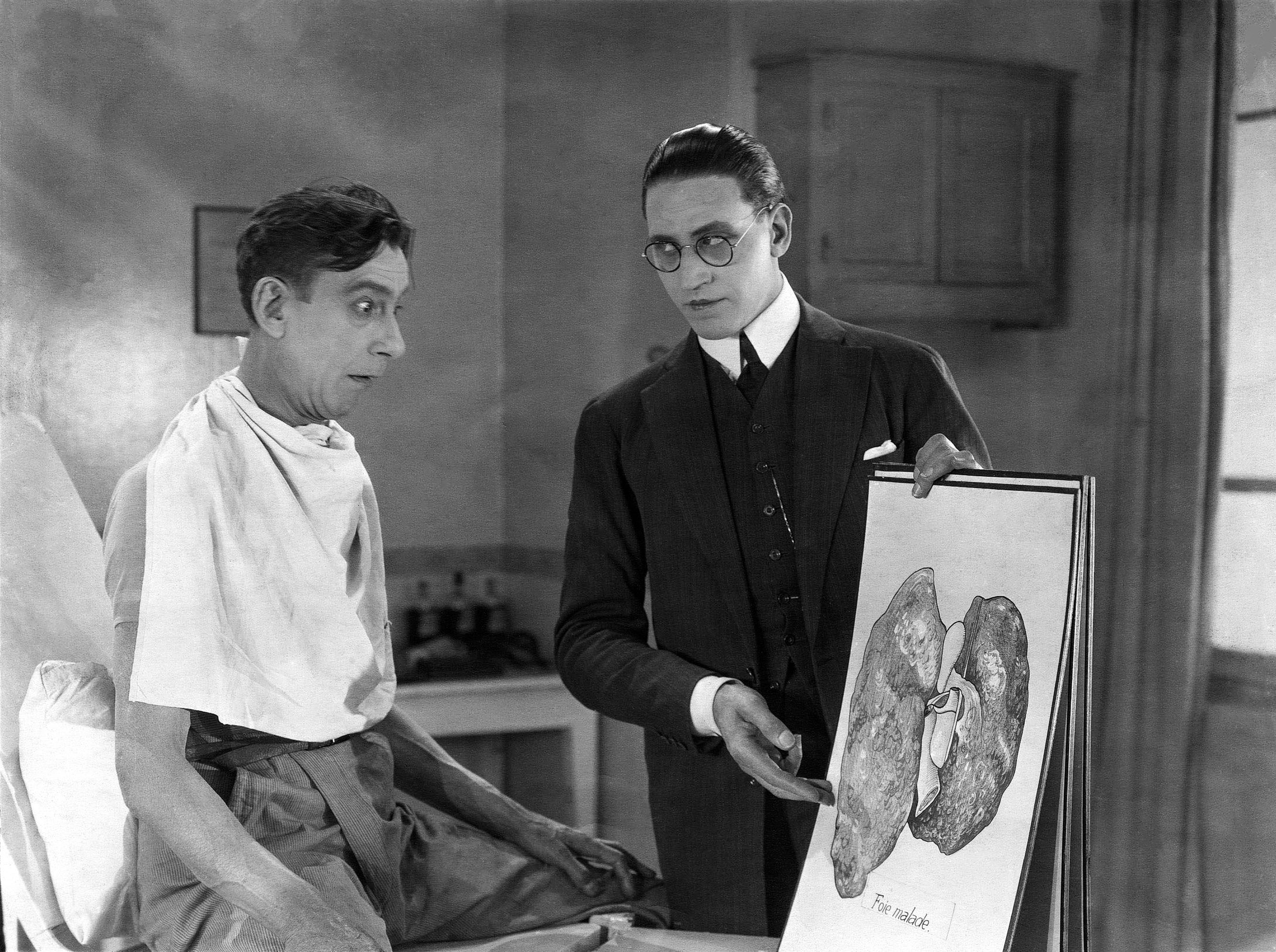
- Directed by: René Hervil
- Written by: Pierre Hamp; Jean Manoussi
- Based on: Knock by Jules Romains
- Produced by: Charles Delac; Marcel Vandal
- Starring: Fernand Fabre; Léon Malavier; René Lefèvre
- Cinematography: René Guichard
- Production company: Film d'Art
- Distributed by: Etablissements Louis Aubert; UFA (Germany)
- Release date: 18 December 1925
- Running time: 100 minutes
- Country: France
- Languages: Silent; French intertitles

Knock is a 1925 French silent comedy film directed by René Hervil and starring Fernand Fabre, Léon Malavier and René Lefèvre. Location shooting took place around Uzerche. It was based on the play of the same title by Jules Romains. Subsequent sound remakes were made Knock (1933) and Doctor Knock (1951).

== Cast ==
- Fernand Fabre as Le docteur Knock
- Léon Malavier as Le docteur Parpalaid
- René Lefèvre as Jean - le voiturier
- Lucien Carol as Un paysan
- Raoul Darblay as Le pharmacien Mousquet
- Luce Fabiole as Charcutière
- Maryanne as Madame Parpalaid
- Louis Monfils as Raffalens
- Georges Morton as Paysan
- Irma Perrot as La patronne de l'hôtel
- Iza Reyner as Dame en noir
- Régiane as la pharmacienne

== Bibliography ==
- Goble, Alan. The Complete Index to Literary Sources in Film. Walter de Gruyter, 1999.
- Rège, Philippe. Encyclopedia of French Film Directors, Volume 1. Scarecrow Press, 2009.
