= Princess Theatre (New York, 29th Street) =

Former Broadway theatre in New York

Coordinates: 40°44′45.5″N 73°59′20″W

Princess Theatre was a Broadway theatre located at 29th Street and Broadway in Manhattan, New York City. Built in 1875, it was operated as a theatre for minstrel shows and later also vaudeville and renamed several times. It was leased in 1902 by the Shuberts as a legitimate theatre and renamed the Princess Theatre. The building was converted to retail shops in 1907, and the site is now occupied by an apartment building.

== History ==
Built in 1875 near the intersection of 29th Street and Broadway in Manhattan, the theatre was first named San Francisco Minstrels Music Hall, where it presented minstrel shows. After the San Francisco Minstrels left, the building was rented to various minstrel and vaudeville companies. After this, it was renamed several times, including Hermann's Gaiety Theatre, Jack's Theatre, Theatre Comique and Jonah Theatre. In 1902, the Shuberts leased it and renamed it the Princess Theatre. Its longest running show was Richard III. The building was made into retail shops in 1907. The foyer and orchestra were remodelled and reopened on October 9, 1907 as a clothing and furnishing store. At the time of its demolition, the address was 1195 Broadway. In 1930, a 10-story apartment building was constructed in the space.

Two other theatres with the same name later operated elsewhere in New York City .

== Productions ==
- The Night of the Party (1902)
- Heidelberg (1902)
- The Consul (1903)
- The Frisky Mrs. Johnson (1903)
- Raffles, the Amateur Cracksman (1903)
- Candida (1903)
- The Sacrament of Judas (1903)
- Much Ado About Nothing (1904)
- Rosmersholm (1904)
- An African Millionaire (1904)
- The Secret of Polichinelle (1904)
- Jack's Little Surprise (1904)
- The West Point Cadet (1904)
- A Message from Mars (1904)
- The Climbers (1904)
- Othello (1904)
- King Richard III (1904)
- Richelieu (1904)
- The House of Burnside (1904)
- Sweet Lavender (1905)
- Love in Idleness (1905)
- The Passport (1905)
- Who Goes There? (1905)
- The Trifler (1905)
- When We Dead Awaken (1905)
- Zira (1905)
- Grierson's Way (1906)
- Brown of Harvard (1906)
- The Great Divide (1906)
- Hedda Gabler (1906)
- A Doll's House (1907)
