= The Secret of Polichinelle =

The Secret of Polichinelle may refer to:

- The Secret of Polichinelle (play), a 1903 comedy play by Pierre Wolff
- The Secret of Polichinelle (1923 film), a 1923 French silent comedy film
- The Secret of Polichinelle (1936 film), a 1936 French comedy film
