= After Love =

After Love may refer to:

- After Love (play), a 1924 play by Henri Duvernois and Pierre Wolff
- After Love (1924 film), a French silent film directed by Maurice Champreux
- After Love (1948 film), a French film directed by Maurice Tourneur
- After Love (2016 film), a French-Belgian film by Joachim Lafosse
- After Love (2020 film), a British-French film by Aleem Khan
- After Love (album), by Dave Burrell, 1970
- "After Love (First Boyfriend) / Girlfriend", a 2009 song by Crystal Kay

== See also ==
- "After the Love", a 2009 song by R.I.O.
