= Jeanne Loury =

French actress (1876–1951)

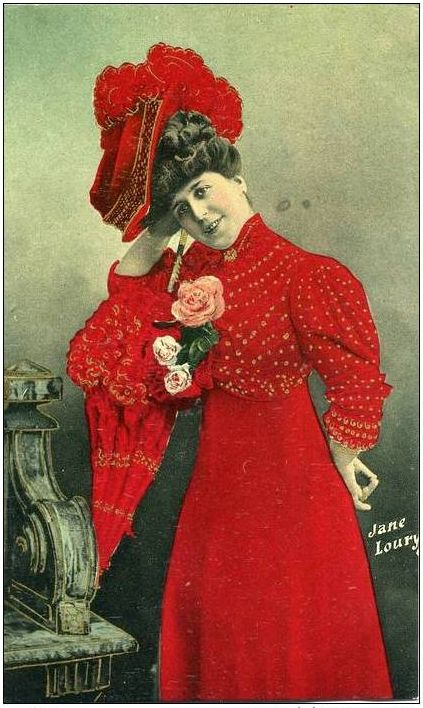
- Loury in 1910
- Born: Antoinette Jeanne Lours; 26 November 1876; Paris, France
- Died: 16 July 1951 (aged 74); Paris, France
- Occupation: Actress
- Years active: 1922-1940 (film)

Jeanne Loury or Jane Loury (1876–1951) was a French stage and film actress.

== Selected filmography ==
- My Aunt from Honfleur (1923)
- House in the Sun (1929)
- Make a Living (1931)
- All That's Not Worth Love (1931)
- A Son from America (1932)
- Chotard and Company (1933)
- Knock (1933)
- Topaze (1933)
- The Crisis is Over (1934)
- Seven Men, One Woman (1936)
- Bizarre, Bizarre (1937)
- The Kiss of Fire (1937)
- Clodoche (1938)
- Monsieur Coccinelle (1938)
- Mother Love (1938)
- Cavalcade of Love (1940)

== Bibliography ==
- Goble, Alan. The Complete Index to Literary Sources in Film. Walter de Gruyter, 1999.
