= Pierre Wolff =

French playwright

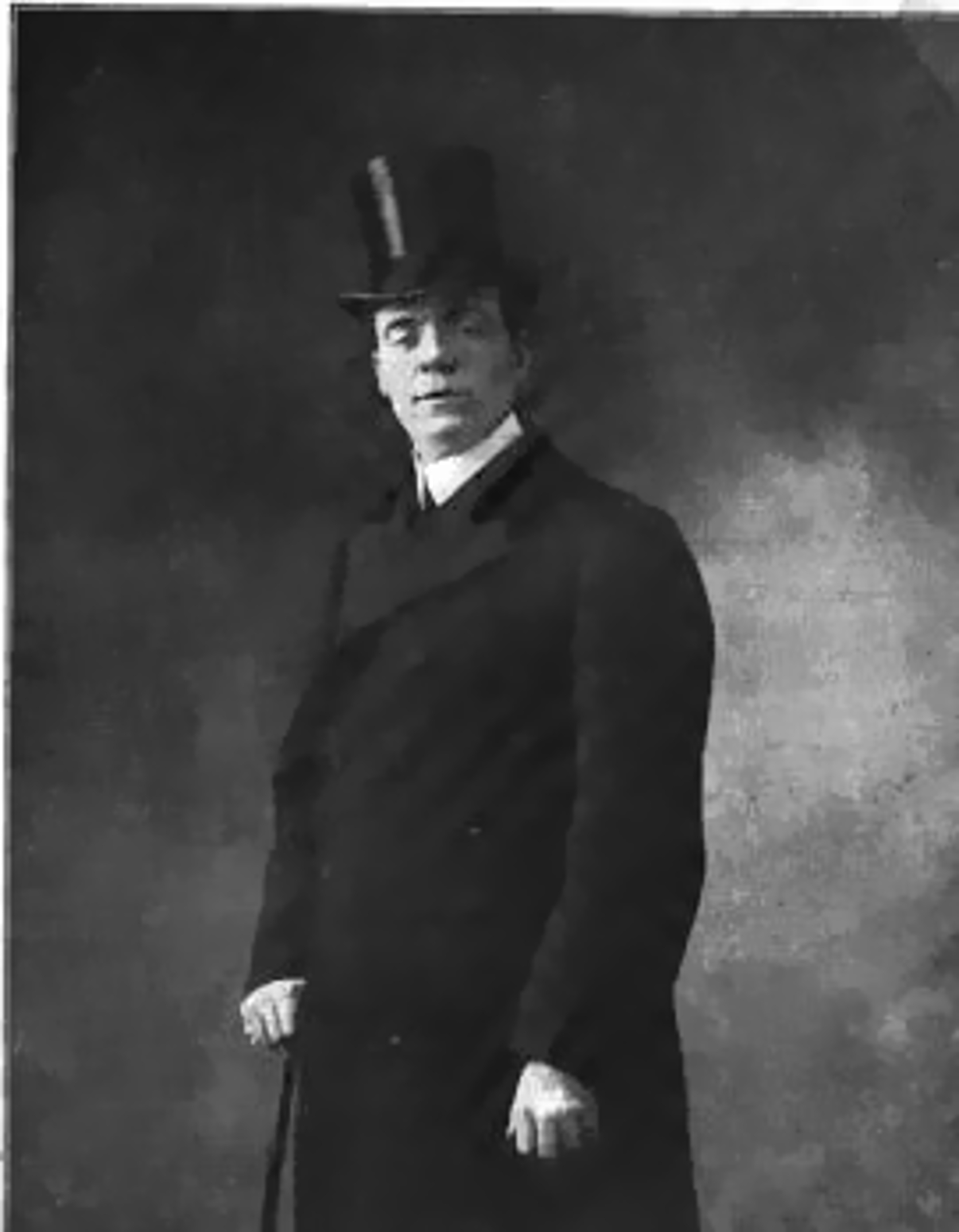
Pierre Wolff by Paul Boyer c. 1905

Pierre Wolff born ( January 1st 1865 Paris, France – July 27th 1944 16th arrondissment, Paris, France ) was a French playwright.

== Biography ==
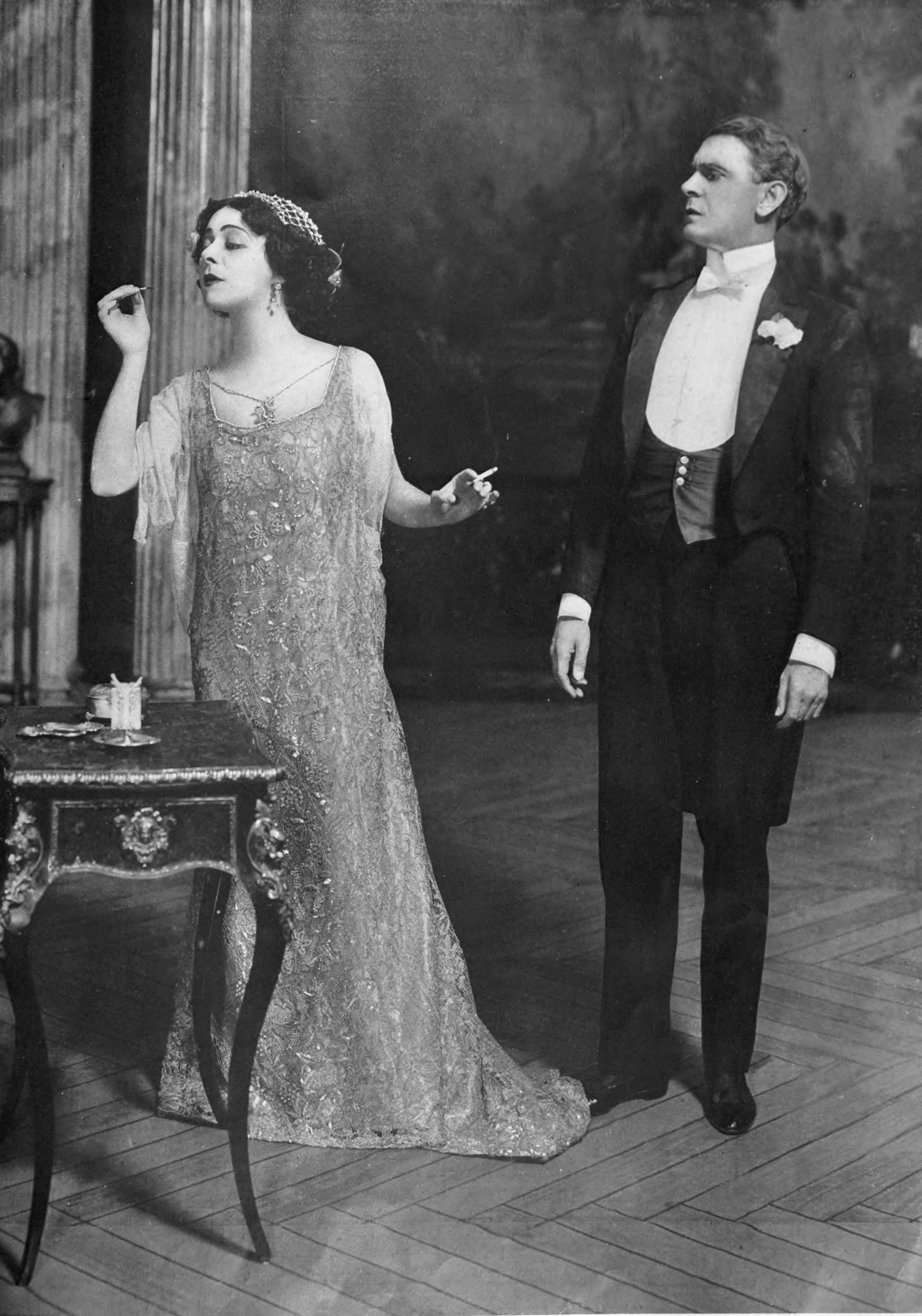
Nazimova and Frank Gillmore in the Broadway production of The Marionettes (1911)

Pierre Wolff was a Jewish writer, who wrote numerous plays, as well as some libretti for operettas. He was the nephew of journalist Albert Wolff. His dramas were characterized by bitingly ironic observation of contemporary life, and by witty dialogue. One of his earliest plays, Jacques Bouchard (1890) which was performed at Théâtre Libre, was such a flop that even his famous uncle lambasted it, but his subsequent plays were received with enthusiasm. He had great success with the adultery-themed comedy The Secret of Polichinelle, which played in over 80 cities including in the United States, and also with Le Ruisseau. Nazimova performed in Les Marionnettes when it was produced in the United States.

== Works ==
=== Plays ===
- Le Cheval d'Aristote 1890
- Jacques Bouchard, 1890
- Leurs filles, 1891
- Les Maris de leurs filles 1892
- Celles qu'on respecte, 1892
- Celles qu'on aime, 1895
- Fidèle!, 1895
- Amants et maîtresses 1896
- Le Boulet, 1898
- Le Béguin, 1900
- Vive l'armée!, 1901
- Sacré Léonce!, 1901
- Le Cadre, 1902
- Celles qu'on respecte 1903
- The Secret of Polichinelle, 1903
- L'Âge d'aimer 1905
- Le Ruisseau, 1907
- Le Lys, 1908
- La Cruche, or J'en ai plein le dos de Margot 1909
- Les Marionnettes 1910
- L'Amour défendu 1911
- Les Deux Gloires 1916
- Le Voile déchiré 1919
- Les Ailes brisées 1920
- Le Chemin de Damas 1921
- Une sacré petite blonde with André Birabeau 1921
- Les Deux amants 1922
- L'École des amants 1923
- After Love, with Henri Duvernois 1924
- Le Renard, 1925
- Deux hommes, 1 act, 1926
- Dibengo, with Henri Duvernois 1925
- Le Dernier Client, 1 act, 1928
- Dix minutes sur la terre, rewrite 1929
- L'Invité, 1 act 1929
- La Belle de nuit 1932
- Les Deux vieilles, 1 act, 1932
- L'Inroulable, 1 act

=== Librettist ===
- Le Temps d'aimer, operetta in 3 actes, with Henri Duvernois, lyrics Hugues Delorme, music Reynaldo Hahn 1926
- Moineau, operetta in 3 actes, with Henri Duvernois, lyrics Léon Guillot de Saix, music Louis Beydts, 1931

== Filmography ==
- The Marionettes, directed by Émile Chautard (1918, based on the play Les Marionnettes)
- The Virtuous Model, directed by Albert Capellani (1919, based on the play Le Ruisseau)
- The Secret of Polichinelle, directed by René Hervil (1923, based on the play The Secret of Polichinelle)
- After Love, directed by Maurice Champreux (1924, based on the play After Love)
- The Lily, directed by Victor Schertzinger (1926, based on the play Le Lys)
- Le Ruisseau, directed by René Hervil (1929, based on the play Le Ruisseau)
- When Love Is Over, directed by Léonce Perret (1931, based on the play After Love)
- Broken Wings, directed by André Berthomieu (1933, based on the play Les Ailes brisées)
- Beauty of the Night, directed by Louis Valray (1934, based on the play La Belle de nuit)
- Sacré Léonce, directed by Christian-Jaque (1936, based on the play Sacré Léonce)
- The Secret of Polichinelle, directed by André Berthomieu (1936, based on the play The Secret of Polichinelle)
- Familjens hemlighet, directed by Gustaf Molander (Sweden, 1936, based on the play The Secret of Polichinelle)
- Le Ruisseau, directed by Maurice Lehmann (1938, based on the play Le Ruisseau)
- After Love, directed by Maurice Tourneur (1948, based on the play After Love)

=== Screenwriter ===
- La route est belle (The Road Is Fine), directed by Robert Florey (1930)
- Un carnet de bal (Life Dances On), directed by Julien Duvivier (1937)
- Abus de confiance (Abused Confidence), directed by Henri Decoin (1938)
- Retour à l'aube (Return at Dawn), directed by Henri Decoin (1938)
- Serenade, directed by Jean Boyer (1940)
- The Man Who Seeks the Truth, directed by Alexander Esway (1940)
- Bring On the Girls, directed by Sidney Lanfield (1945) - Loosely based on The Man Who Seeks the Truth
- Abuso de confianza, directed by Mario C. Lugones (Argentina, 1950) - Remake of Abused Confidence
