= My Aunt from Honfleur =

My Aunt from Honfleur (French: Ma tante d'Honfleur) may refer to:

- My Aunt from Honfleur, a 1914 play by Paul Gavault
- My Aunt from Honfleur (1923 film), a French silent film directed by Robert Saidreau
- My Aunt from Honfleur (1931 film), a French film directed by André Gillois
- My Aunt from Honfleur (1949 film), a French film directed by René Jayet
