= Raffles, the Amateur Cracksman (play) =

1903 play by Eugene W. Presbrey and E. W. Hornung

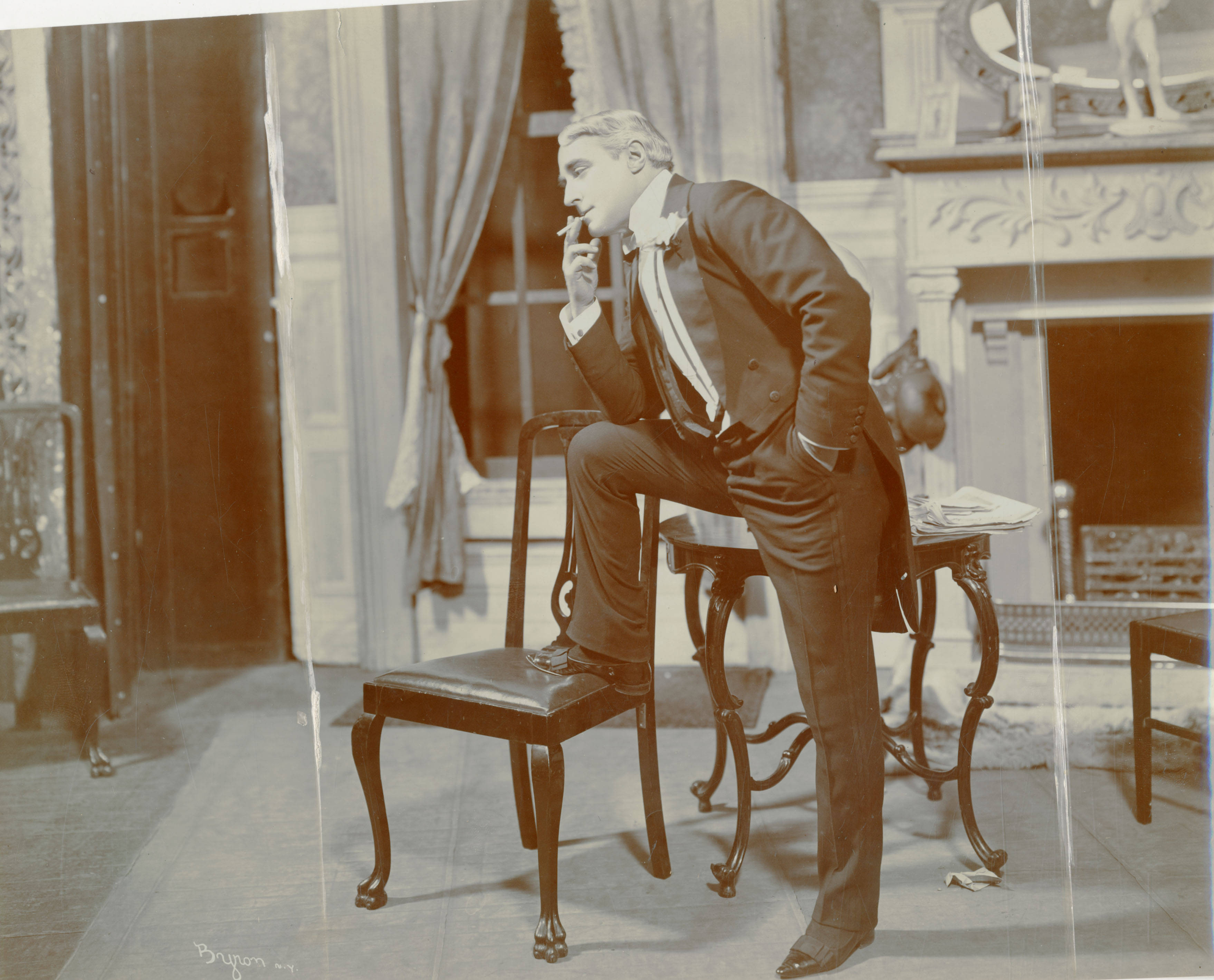
- Kyrle Bellew as Raffles (1903)
- Original language: English
- Written by: Eugene W. Presbrey and E. W. Hornung
- Based on: The Amateur Cracksman by E. W. Hornung
- Subject: Theft as sport
- Genre: Drama
- Setting: Lord Amersteth's country home and Raffles' apartment in London

Premiere
- Date: October 27, 1903
- Place: Princess Theatre
- Directed by: Eugene W. Presbrey

Raffles, the Amateur Cracksman is a 1903 play written by Eugene W. Presbrey and E. W. Hornung, based on two of Hornung's short stories from The Amateur Cracksman. It also draws one of its characters from an 1886 play called Jim the Penman, by Charles Young. It has four acts, and two settings. The story concerns a gentleman jewel thief who steals as much for excitement as necessity, and the efforts of a detective to catch him.

The play was first produced by Liebler & Company, staged by Eugene W. Presbrey, with settings by Gates and Morange, and starred Kyrle Bellew. It had a tryout and some limited engagements starting in September 1903, before premiering on Broadway during October 1903. The production ran for 168 performances through March 1904, before prior scheduling commitments forced it to close.

In London, the West End production, presented by Charles Frohman, opened at the Comedy Theatre on May 12, 1906, with Gerald du Maurier in the lead. It achieved 351 performances, closing on April 3, 1907.

The play had a brief Broadway revival in 1910, and was later adapted for silent films of the same title in 1917 and 1925.

== Characters ==
Characters are listed in order of appearance within their scope.

Lead

- Raffles is a gentleman athlete in his thirties, a renowned amateur cricket player.
- Capt. Bedford is a middle-aged amateur detective, who is after the Cracksman for sport.

Supporting

- Harry Manders is Raffles' younger chum and old school fag, called by him "Bunny".
- Lord Amersteth is owner of Amsterth Abbey in Milchester, (Note: A fictional location in Dorset.) and sponsor of the local cricket team.
- Lord Crowley is 20, the son of Lord Amersteth, who has invited Raffles to play cricket with him.
- Crawshay is a "professor", Raffles' term for a professional burglar.
- Mrs. Vidal is in her mid-thirties, the beautiful wife of Raffles' friend.
- Gwendolyn Conron is a young woman, daughter of Lady Melrose and Lord Amersteth, and enamored of Raffles.

Featured

- Lady Melrose is the wife of Lord Amersteth, the owner of a fine diamond and sapphire necklace.
- Lady Ethel
- Marie is a French woman with little English, maid to Lady Melrose.
- Merton is an official detective.
- Goldby is butler to Lord Amsterth.
- Barraclough is Raffles' valet.

== Synopsis ==
This synopsis is constructed from newspaper reviews of 1903. The first two acts take place in the library of Lord Amersteth's country house, while the last two are set in Raffles' apartments at "The Albany" in London.

Guests at Lord Amersteth's country home discuss the mysterious "Cracksman" who has escaped detection. Captain Bedford has come to Milchester in belief that Lady Melrose's famous necklace will be the next target. Raffles had been invited to Milchester by Lord Crowley, for his 21st birthday celebration, and brought along Bunny. Raffles and Captain Bedford make a wager of £100 that the latter will not capture the famous Cracksman. Raffles had spotted Crawshay earlier. Raffles steals the necklace first, leaving Lady Melrose's jewelbox for Crawshay to take. Captain Bedford is dubious about Raffles' alibi, but does not hold him. Meanwhile, Mrs. Vidal has learned of Raffles' secret identity and threatens to expose him unless he accepts her as his mistress. He refuses, but does succumb to the charms of Gwendolyn, who will not be put off with Bunny.

Back in London, Bunny for the first time learns that Raffles is the Cracksman and has the necklace. They are interrupted by Crawshay, who has followed them. However, Captain Bedford has also followed. Raffles now contrives to help Crawshay escape, lest he peach to Bedford. Gwendolyn visits Raffles, but although in love he will not yield to her. Only after Captain Bedford confirms Raffles is the cracksman, does he return the necklace. Bedford moves to arrest him, but allows him the gentleman's way out. Raffles withdraws behind a curtain, presumably to commit suicide. A pistol shot is heard, but Bedford finds no body behind the curtain. Raffles has escaped thru an extra bedroom door, that comes out into a Grandfather clock in the main room. Bedford tells Bunny that he's glad Raffles got away.

== Original production ==
=== Background ===
Liebler & Company was a partnership between investor T. A. Liebler and producer-manager George C. Tyler. Eugene Wiley Presbrey was a playwright who also worked as a stage director for Liebler & Company. Tyler persuaded E. W. Hornung to allow a revision to his original attempt to dramatize Raffles. Hornung mailed his first draft from England to Presbrey in America. Presbrey revised it considerably; among other changes, he added a character called Captain Redwood from an 1886 play, Jim the Penman, to provide Raffles with a significant opponent. The role of Captain Redwood in Jim the Penman had been created by E. M. Holland, who was signed early on to play the same role in Raffles, though the character's name was changed to Captain Bedford. Presbrey used plot elements of two short stories in The Amateur Cracksman, "Gentlemen and Players" and "The Return Match", which are connected by the affair of Lady Melrose's diamonds. When Presbrey was finished, he mailed the revised play back to Hornung in England.

Casting was complete by September 12, 1903, while two days later the sets for the production had been built and tried out at Murray Hill Theatre in New York.

George C. Tyler says in his 1934 memoir that he tried to interest E. W. Hornung and Arthur Conan Doyle in pitting their creations, Raffles and Sherlock Holmes, against each other in a stage play. The two authors, who were brothers-in-law, demurred; according to Tyler, because neither one could bear that his protagonist be bested by the other.

=== Cast ===
Principals only for the tryouts and the Broadway run.
| Role | Actor | Dates | Notes and sources |
|---|---|---|---|
| Raffles | Kyrle Bellew | Sep 19, 1903 - Mar 26, 1904 | |
| Capt. Bedford | E. M. Holland | Sep 19, 1903 - Mar 26, 1904 | |
| Harry Manders | Edwin Arden | Sep 19, 1903 - Oct 03, 1903 | Arden was plucked from this secondary role to play opposite Eleanor Robson in Merely Mary Ann. |
| Harry Manders | Stanton Elliot | Oct 06, 1903 - Mar 26, 1904 | |
| Lord Amersteth | Frank Roberts | Sep 19, 1903 - Mar 26, 1904 | |
| Lord Crowley | Frank Connor | Sep 19, 1903 - Mar 26, 1904 | |
| Crawshay | Frank McCormack | Sep 19, 1903 - Mar 26, 1904 | |
| Mrs. Vidal | Ethel Matthews | Sep 19, 1903 - Jan 23, 1904 | |
| Mrs. Vidal | Beverly Sitgreaves | Jan 25, 1904 - Mar 26, 1904 | |
| Gwendolyn Conron | Clara Blandick | Sep 19, 1903 - Mar 26, 1904 | |
| Lady Ethel | Lucy Milner | Sep 19, 1903 - Mar 26, 1904 | |
| Lady Melrose | Hattie Russell | Sep 19, 1903 - Mar 26, 1904 | |
| Marie | Mignon Berenger | Sep 19, 1903 - Mar 26, 1904 | |
| Merton | A. W. Grass | Sep 19, 1903 - Mar 26, 1904 | |
| Goldby | Alfred James | Sep 19, 1903 - Mar 26, 1904 | |
| Barraclough | Ernest Williams | Sep 19, 1903 - Mar 26, 1904 | |

=== Tryout and pre-Broadway engagements ===
Raffles was first performed for a one-night tryout at Young's Pier Theatre in Atlantic City, New Jersey on September 19, 1903. It was well received by a large audience, and the reviewer mentioned only a "talky" first act as a fault. It then went to a two-week engagement at Philadelphia's Garrick Theatre starting September 21, 1903. The local critic found interesting the dramatists explanation of Raffles condition as a disease of the mind, and credited him with a play that keeps the audience's attention throughout.

After Philadelphia the production played four one-night stands in Pennsylvania. There followed a week-long engagement in Washington, D.C. at the New National Theatre starting October 12, 1903. The Washington reviewer noted that "Mr. Presbrey, who made the dramatization, has been a little too fatherly" with Raffles, "with Ibsenish hints at heredity" and efforts to build sympathy for a character always on top of every event who doesn't need it. They also thought it sad that aside from E. M. Holland and Frank McCormack, there was no one to better support Kyrle Bellew. Kyrle Bellew visited President Roosevelt at the White House on October 14, while the next day Mrs. Roosevelt, Justice Holmes, and Secretary Moody attended a performance of Raffles.

The final engagement prior to Broadway was one week at Ford's Theatre in Baltimore, starting October 19, 1903. The critic for The Baltimore Sun found no fault with the play; they said Kyrle Bellew's Raffles was believable and the audience heartily approved the performance.

=== Broadway premiere and reception ===
Raffles had its Broadway premiere on October 27, 1903, at the Princess Theatre. The New-York Tribune reviewer was dismissive of suave, elegant thieves as a stage novelty, and even more so of crime as a mental disease or aberration. They were harsh with Kyrle Bellew, saying he was "too completely artificial, shallow, and saccharine not to become monotonous and insipid." They did recommend seeing the play for E. M. Holland, "who repeats in it, under new circumstances, his old achievement of seeming languid indifference veiling vigilant attention and splendid executive force, in Jim the Penman. The critic for The New York Times also thought Raffles no novelty as a thief, but admired Presbrey's idea of giving Raffles and the detective equal stage time and making them both amateurs.

Charles Darnton in The Evening World felt that Raffles was "still little more than a sketch". The reviewer for The Sun said the play was a "stained glass dime novel" and the audience "composed of grown-up children". They also contrasted the acting styles of Bellew and E. M. Holland, calling it "a duel of methods-- the polished romantic and the polished naturalistic".

By November 1903, The New York Times reported that Raffles was "one of the few plays now in the city that are filling their theatres", while two weeks later Raffles run at the Princess Theatre was "extended for an indefinite term". Leander Richardson in The Buffalo News said Kyrle Bellew was popular with the "matinee girls" who hung around the stage door to see him after daytime performances, something that didn't happen when he played "virtuous" roles.

=== The Sacrament of Judas ===
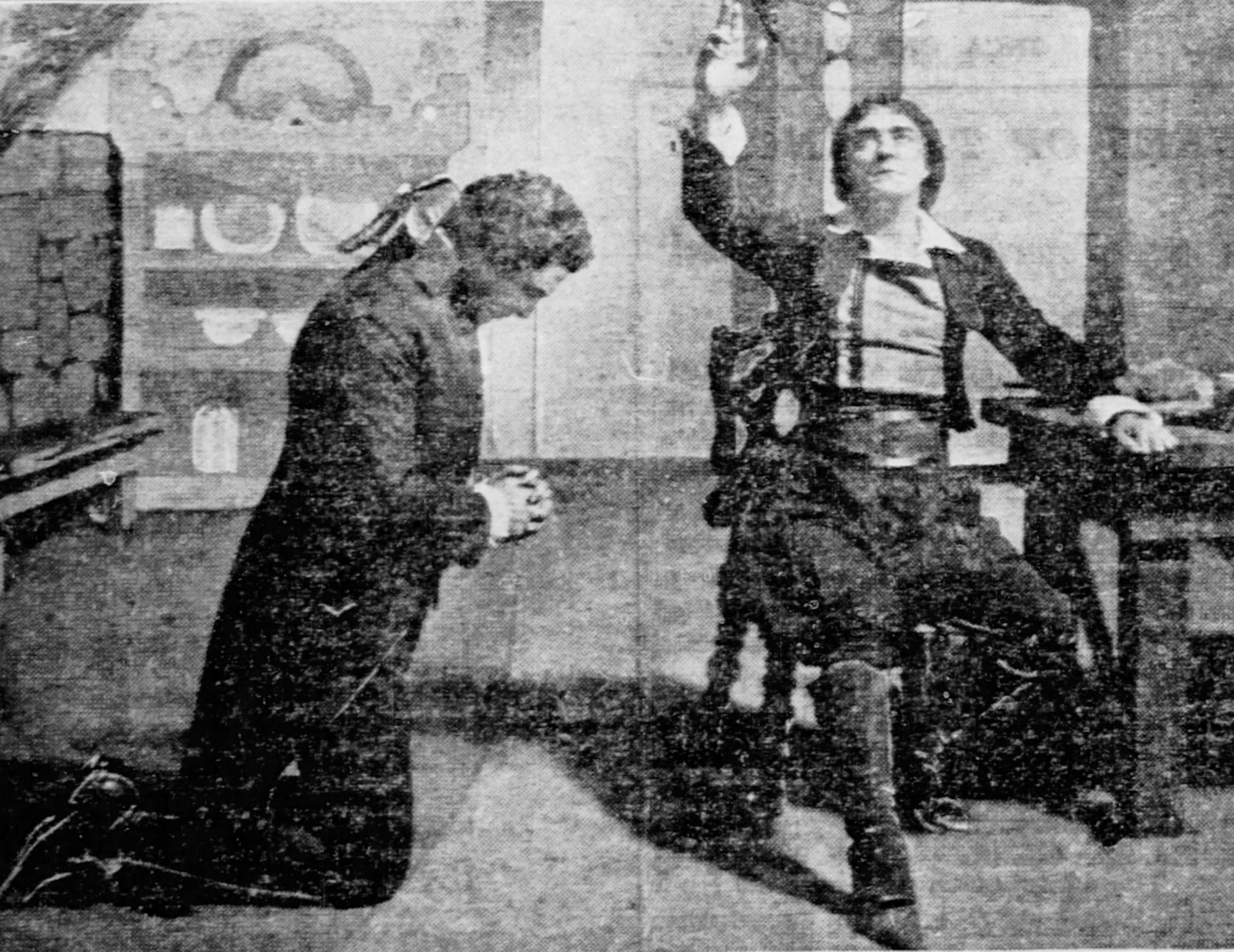

From December 15, 1903, Liebler & Company added a one-act play, The Sacrament of Judas, as a curtain-raiser for the nightly performance of Raffles. (Note: At just two hours running time, including intervals, Raffles was much shorter than many plays. The Sacrament of Judas ran for 45 minutes, bringing the night's entertainment up to more usual lengths.) This five-character tragedy by Louis Tiercelin was staged by Forbes Robertson, and performed by the principals of Raffles: Kyrle Bellew, Frank Connor, Frank Roberts, Frank McCormack, and Clara Blandick. The story is set in Brittany during 1793, and deals with a defrocked priest (Bellew), a fugitive count (Connor), a tenant farmer (Roberts) and his granddaughter (Blandick), and a brutal agent of the revolutionary government (McCormack). The piece was new to Broadway, but had been played extensively in London. It was originally planned for a two-week run as a holiday supplement, but proved popular and was continued as long as Raffles remained at the Princess.

=== Change of venue ===
On February 4, 1904, the Princess Theatre and five other venues were shut down by order of Mayor McClellan for failure to comply with directives issued by the Building and Health departments of New York City. Police blocked the entrances of the theaters and warned the managers they would be arrested if they tried to open. Producer George C. Tyler sent the Raffles company to play one-night stands in smaller New England cities, until performances on Broadway could be resumed on February 15, 1904, at the Savoy Theatre.

=== Closing ===
Raffles closed at the Savoy Theatre on March 26, 1904. It was still profitable after 168 performances, but Kyrle Bellew and several others of the cast were booked for a revival of The Two Orphans, and the theater was to be closed for alterations to bring it in compliance with a new fire code.

== Revival ==
Charles Frohman produced a revival of Raffles in 1910 with Kyrle Bellew again in the title role. It opened at the Garrick Theatre on November 1, 1910, with Frank McCormack also reprising his character, the burglar Crawshay. Frank Connor from the original cast now played Harry Manders, while Frank Westerton played Capt. Bedford and Gladys Hanson was Gwendolyn Conron. The revival finished up on November 19, 1910, after 24 performances.

== Adaptations ==
=== Stage ===
- Waffles, the Amateur Cracker - One-act burlesque performed by Weber & Fields at their music hall starting in December 1903. Peter F. Dailey portrayed Waffles, Louis Mann the detective, Lew Fields the burglar, and Joe Weber the French Maid.

=== Film ===
- Raffles, the Amateur Cracksman (1917 film)
- Raffles, the Amateur Cracksman (1925 film)

== Bibliography ==
- George C. Tyler and J. C. Furnas. Whatever Goes Up. Bobbs Merrill, 1934.
