= After Love (1924 film) =

1924 film directed by Maurice Champreux

- Directed by: Maurice Champreux
- Written by: Maurice Champreux
- Based on: After Love by Henri Duvernois; Pierre Wolff
- Starring: André Nox; Jeanne Provost; Blanche Montel
- Cinematography: Léon Morizet
- Production company: Gaumont
- Distributed by: Gaumont
- Release date: 1924
- Country: France
- Languages: Silent; French intertitles

After Love (French: Après l'amour) is a 1924 French silent drama film directed by Maurice Champreux and starring André Nox, Jeanne Provost and Blanche Montel. It is based on the play of the same title by Pierre Wolff and Henri Duvernois. It was remade twice in sound, the 1931 film When Love Is Over and After Love in 1948.

== Cast ==
- André Nox as François Mésaule
- Jeanne Provost as Nicole Mésaule
- Blanche Montel as Germaine By
- Henri-Amédée Charpentier as Émile, le domestique
- Daout as Madame Lephiernand
- de Kerdec as Fournier
- Julio de Romero as Martelet
- Delettre as Suzanne Trèfle
- Émile Drain as Lephiernand
- Yvette Langlais as Le petit André
- Jean Napoléon Michel as Simon
- Maurice Sigrist as Jacques

== Bibliography ==
- Goble, Alan. The Complete Index to Literary Sources in Film. Walter de Gruyter, 1999.
- Limbacher, James L. Haven't I seen you somewhere before?: Remakes, sequels, and series in motion pictures and television, 1896-1978. Pierian Press, 1979.
- Taillé, Daniel. Léonce Perret, cinématographiste. Association "Cinémathèque en Deux-Sèvres", 2006.
