= Edmund Holland =

Edmund Holland may refer to:

- Edmund Holland, 4th Earl of Kent
- Edmund Milton Holland, American comedian
