= Love After Love =

Love After Love can refer to:

- Love After Love (1992 film), a French film
- Love After Love (2017 film), an American film
- Love After Love (2020 film), a Chinese film
- "Love After Love" (poem), a poem by Derek Walcott
- Cinta Setelah Cinta (Indonesian: Love After Love), 2020s Indonesian TV show

== See also ==
- After Love (disambiguation)
- Love (disambiguation)
