= Georges Neveux =

French dramatist and poet

Georges Neveux (1900–1982) was a French dramatist and poet.

Neveux's first notable work was the play Juliette, or Key of Dreams (Juliet or the key to dreams), written in 1927 and produced in 1930. It became the basis of Theodor Schaefer's 1934 melodrama Julie aneb Snar (Julie or the Book of Dreams) for piano, jazz instruments, and small orchestra; for Bohuslav Martinů's 1937 opera Julietta, and for the 1951 film Juliette, or Key of Dreams.

During the 1930s, when he was general secretary of the Théâtre des Champs-Élysées, he wrote little. In 1943 there appeared Le Voyage de Thésée (The Voyage of Theseus), which was also later adapted by Martinů as an opera (Ariane, 1958). In 1945 he translated and adapted Shakespeare's A Midsummer Night's Dream.

Neveux also wrote numerous filmscripts, although he greatly preferred the theatre. As he said: 'the first because one must earn a living, the second because one must deserve to live'.

In 1982 he was awarded the Grand Prix du Théâtre de l’Académie française.

He often collaborated with the composer Maurice Jaubert.

== Selected filmography ==
- The Devil's Holiday (1931)
- The Lovers of Midnight (1931)
- Narcotics (1932)
- Knock (1933)
- The Decoy (1935)
- The Devil in the Bottle (1935)
- Donogoo (1936)
- Foolish Husbands (1941)
- The Beautiful Adventure (1942)
- Lucrèce (1943)
- To the Eyes of Memory (1948)
- Dr. Knock (1951)
- The Lovers of Midnight (1953)
- The Count of Monte Cristo (1954)
- The Little Czar (1954)
- The Affair of the Poisons (1955)
- Arsène Lupin Versus Arsène Lupin (1962)
- The New Adventures of Vidocq (1971, TV series)

== Bibliography ==
- Germaine Bree, Georges Neveux: A Theatre of Adventure, in Yale French Studies, vol. IV (1954)
