= Henri Monteux =

French actor (1874–1943)

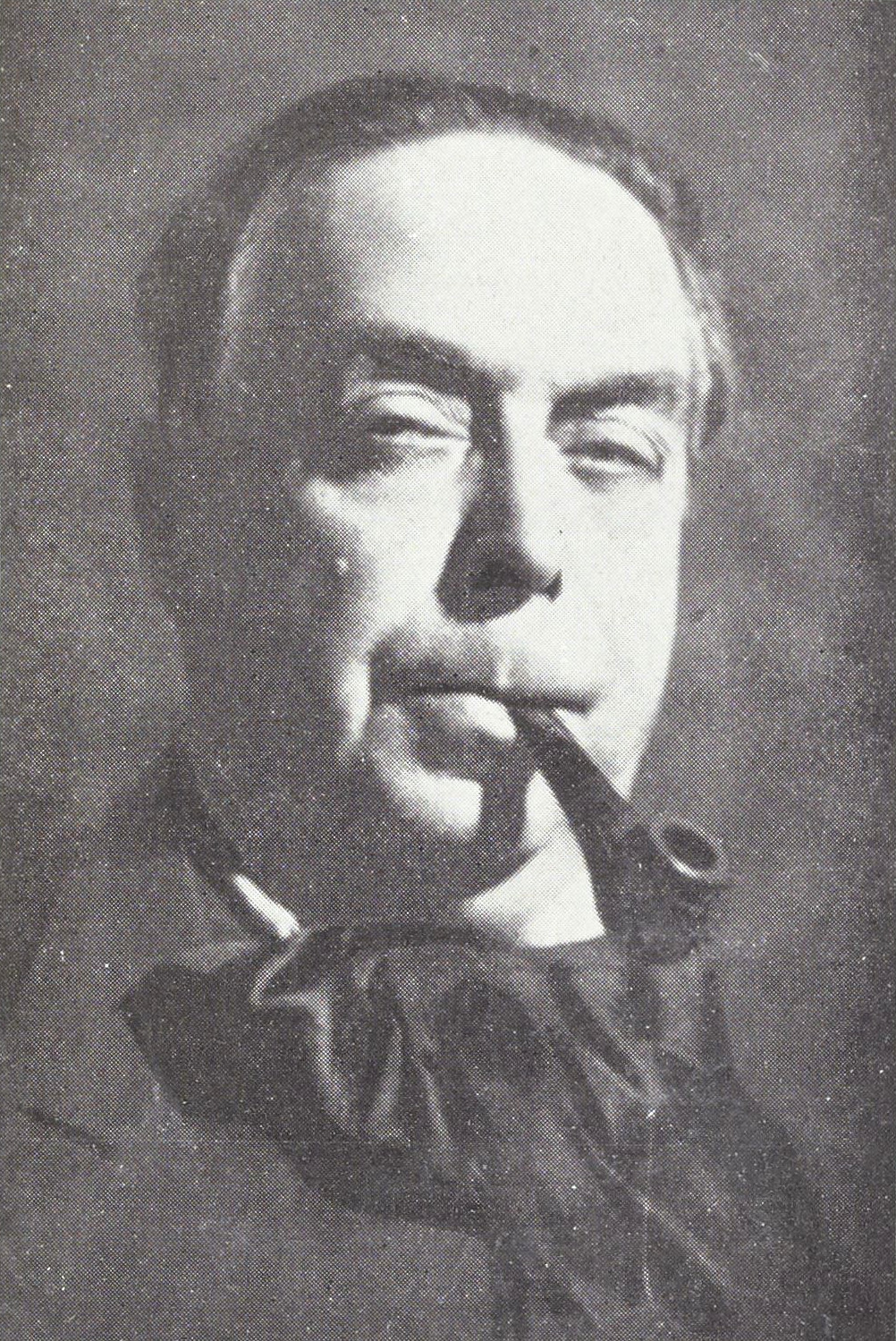
- Born: Henri Philippe Moïse Monteux; 23 February 1874; Paris, France
- Died: 12 April 1943 (aged 69); Sachsenhausen, Germany
- Occupation: Actor
- Years active: 1894–1939

Henri Philippe Moïse Monteux (born Paris, 23 February 1874, died Sachsenhausen, 12 April 1943) was a French theatre and film actor, and an elder brother of the conductor Pierre Monteux. (Note: John Canarina in his book Pierre Monteux, Maître (2003) gives the year of death as 1944.) His family was descended from Sephardic Jews who settled in France.

== Life and career ==
Born at 16 rue de la Grange Batelière, he was the fourth child of Gustave and Clémence Monteux who had moved to Paris from Marseille in 1864. It was a modest household, his father being a shoe-maker and his mother a piano teacher. His younger brother Pierre later recalled as children spending afternoons observing the passers-by in the local square laid the foundations of the future actor's characterisations.

Monteux made his debut at the Théâtre National de l'Odéon on 30 September 1895 as Georges Bréval in La Vie by Adolphe Thalasso, having won the prize for tragedy at the Paris Conservatoire (pupil of Gustave Worms) with his performance as Othello the previous July. He played the same part to considerable praise in a production of de Vigny's More de Venise at the same theatre in December that year. He played in the revue at the Folies Bergère in 1903: a most amusing pantomime with dogs "une pantomime extrêmement amusante, jouée par des chiens" The Merian Dogs.

He followed these with leading roles such as Molière in Le Prêcheur converti, the title rôle in Britannicus, Oreste in Andromaque, and Robert Morel in the premiere of Les Irréguliers. He later became famous at the Théâtre Sarah-Bernhardt and was considered a specialist in the plays of Rostand, noted in roles associated with Benoît-Constant Coquelin, and went on to make several films and records.

In 1937 Monteux starred in Pas de ça chez nous at the Théâtre de la Renaissance (Théâtre du Peuple) as the President. A reviewer commented that Henri Monteux reminded everyone what a remarkable actor he was, displaying dramatic intensity coupled with fantasy. (Note: « qui a mené le tableau avec fantaisie et aussi à certains instants une intensité dramatique fort impressionnante.»)

At the time of his arrest in Paris he was playing with acclaim the drunken father in Gorky's The Mother.

== Films ==
- Un roman parisien (1913) as Baron Chevrial – directed by Adrien Caillard
- Je t'aime (1914)
- La maison du baigneur (1914) – Adrien Caillard and Georges Monca
- L'équipage (1928) as Mathieu – Maurice Tourneur (English : The Crew)
- My Priest Among the Rich (Mon curé chez les riches, 1938) as Monseigneur Sibué – Jean Boyer
- Cavalcade d'amour (1939) as Joseph – Raymond Bernard
- Savage Brigade (La Brigade sauvage, 1939) – Jean Dréville

== Theatrical work ==
This includes:

- 1896 : Les Perses by Aeschylus at the Théâtre national de l'Odéon
- 1902 : Nos deux consciences by Paul Anthelme (Dubois)
- 1905 : Les Oberlé by Edmond Haraucourt (Jean Oberlé)
- 1907 : The Affair of the Poisons by Victorien Sardou at the Théâtre de la Porte Saint-Martin (Carloni)
- 1907 : Le Manteau du Roi by Jean Aicard at the Théâtre de la Porte Saint-Martin
- 1908 : La Femme X... by Alexandre Bisson (Raymond)
- 1909 : Nick Carter by Alexandre Bisson (title role)
- 1909 : La Pierre de Lune by Louis Péricaud and Henri Desfontaines at the Théâtre de la Porte Saint-Martin (Franklin Blake)
- 1911 : Les Deux Orphelines by d'Ennery and Cormon at the Théâtre de l'Ambigu-Comique (Pierre)
- 1921 : Monsieur de Pourceaugnac by Molière
- 1925 : Mon curé chez les riches by André de Lorde and Pierre Chaine (Mgr Sibué)
- 1925 : L'Archange by Maurice Rostand (Général d'Espernon)
- 1926 : Deburau by Sacha Guitry (a doctor)
- 1927 : Les Amants de Paris by Pierre Frondaie (Poirinet)
- 1929 : Tristan et Iseut by Joseph Bédier and Louis Artus (Didas de Lidan)
- 1931 : La Dame aux Camélias by Alexandre Dumas (Georges Duval)
- 1931 : L'Aiglon by Edmond Rostand at the Théâtre Sarah-Bernhardt
- 1932 : Une jeune fille espagnole by Maurice Rostand (the general)
- 1938 : Là-bas by Titaÿna with music by Jacqueline Batell (Fortune)
- 1938 : Font-aux-Cabres by Lope de Vega, adapted by Jean Cassou and Jean Camp (the Alcade)

== Notes and references ==
Notes
