= Savage Brigade =

- Directed by: Marcel L'Herbier
- Written by: André-Paul Antoine; Maurice Bessy; Pierre Rocher; Marcel L'Herbier
- Starring: Véra Korène; Charles Vanel; Florence Marly
- Cinematography: Michel Kelber
- Edited by: Henri Taverna
- Music by: Michel Michelet
- Production company: Franco London Films
- Distributed by: Société Nouvelle des Films Dispa
- Release date: 26 April 1939
- Running time: 95 minutes
- Country: France
- Language: French

Savage Brigade (French: La Brigade sauvage) is a 1939 French drama film directed by Marcel L'Herbier and starring Véra Korène, Charles Vanel and Florence Marly. The film was completed by Jean Dréville. The film's sets were designed by the art director Serge Piménoff.

== Synopsis ==
A Russian general's wife is killed by a jealous mistress at the apartment of a lieutenant. The general provokes a duel with the junior officer, but with the approach of the 1914 war the duel is deferred as both officers are needed with their regiments. Twenty years later in Paris, the general comes across and shoots the former lieutenant whom he injures; the truth about his wife then emerges.

== Cast ==
- Véra Korène as Marie Kalitjeff
- Charles Vanel as Général Kalitjeff
- Youcca Troubetzkov as Boris Mirski
- Lisette Lanvin as Natasha Kalitjeff
- Florence Marly as Isa Ostrowski
- Roger Duchesne as Grand-duc Paul
- Jean Galland as Maximoff
- Paul Amiot
- Denis d'Inès
- Paul Demange
- Ève Francis
- Georgina
- Georgette Lefebvre
- Liliane Lesaffre
- Henri Monteux
- Pierre Nay
- André Nox
- Poussard
- Philippe Richard
- Georges Vitray
- Josette Zell
