= Jeanne Provost =

French actress (1887–1980)

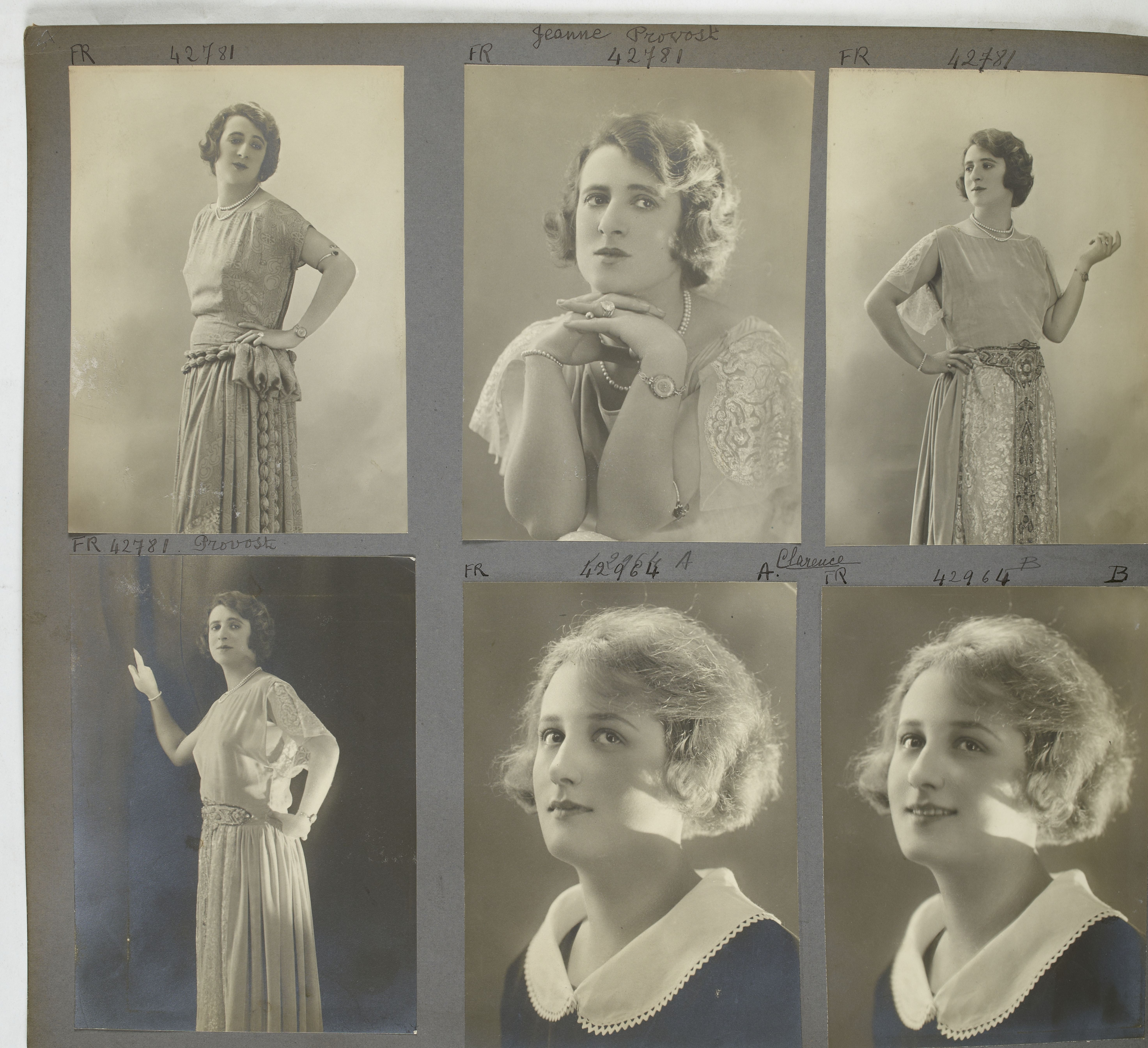
- Born: 28 November 1887; Paris, France
- Died: 24 November 1980 (aged 92); Paris, France
- Occupation: Actress
- Years active: 1910–1961 (film)

Jeanne Provost (28 November 1887 – 24 November 1980) was a French actress. She was a member of the Comédie-Française from 1907 to 1912. In 1928, she appeared in the original cast of Marcel Pagnol's play Topaze.

== Selected filmography ==
- After Love (1924)
- The Beautiful Adventure (1932)
- Gribouille (1937)
- Katia (1938)
- Let's Go Up the Champs-Élysées (1938)
- Monsieur Coccinelle (1938)
- President Haudecoeur (1940)
- The Ironmaster (1948)
- The Secret of Helene Marimon (1954)

== Bibliography ==
- Goble, Alan. The Complete Index to Literary Sources in Film. Walter de Gruyter, 1999.
