= Doctor Knock =

Play written by Jules Romains

Knock ou le Triomphe de la médecine, better known in English as Doctor Knock or Dr. Knock, is a 1923 French-language satirical play in three acts about modern medicine, written by Jules Romains. It was performed for the first time at the Théâtre des Champs-Élysées in Paris on 15 December 1923 in a production by Louis Jouvet. It was published in the English-language under the title Doctor Knock in 1925 using a translation by Harley Granville-Barker. Barker's version had earlier premiered in London at the Royalty Theatre on 27 April 1924 in the first English language production of the play. Granville-Barker's translation was also used for the work's Broadway production at the American Laboratory Theatre in 1928.

The play was presented with set designs by a young Orson Welles in Dublin in 1932, translated into and performed in Esperanto the same year, and also broadcast on TV by BBC Television as early as 1938.

== Plot ==
The ambitious Dr. Knock arrives in a rural village, Saint-Maurice, to step into Dr. Parpalaid's footsteps as the local physician. Unfortunately, most of the villagers are in good health. He therefore decides to make everybody believe they are actually far sicker than they actually are...

The magazine Esperanto summarized the play in 1932 as being about an old-fashioned doctor and a very modern doctor, both tricking each other, with the modern doctor Knock winning.

== Other performances ==
As Dr. Knock, the play was presented at the Peacock Theatre in Dublin in 1932, with set designs by the 16-year-old Orson Welles.

The play was translated into Esperanto by Pierre Corret. The translation, with the title Knock, aŭ La Triumfo de Medicino was published in 1932, and the same year the play was performed at the 24th World Esperanto Congress in Paris. The translation was described as "completely classical, orthodox" by the magazine Esperanto.

== Adaptations ==
=== Film adaptations ===
- Knock, directed by René Hervil (1925), starring Fernand Fabre
- Knock ou le triomphe de la médecine, directed by Roger Goupillières and Louis Jouvet (1933), starring Louis Jouvet
- Dr. Knock, directed by Guy Lefranc (1951), starring Louis Jouvet
- Knock, directed by Lorraine Lévy (2017), starring Omar Sy

=== TV adaptations ===
A version entitled "Doctor Knock" was broadcast on BBC Television from Alexandra Palace – the only television of the time – on 13 January 1938. Performed live, no recording is thought to have ever existed.

A British television version for the BBC's Theatre 625 series was broadcast in 1966. This version was telerecorded and has survived.

- Knock o il trionfo della medicina, directed by Vittorio Cottafavi (1967), starring Alberto Lionello
