= Beauty of the Night =

1934 film

- Directed by: Louis Valray
- Written by: Arnold Lippschitz
- Based on: Beauty of the Night by Pierre Wolff
- Produced by: André E. Algazy
- Starring: Véra Korène; Aimé Clariond; Paul Bernard
- Cinematography: Marc Bujard; Georges-Lucas Kosta
- Music by: Hans May
- Production company: Metropa-Films
- Distributed by: Gaumont-Franco Film-Aubert
- Release date: 2 March 1934
- Running time: 87 minutes
- Country: France
- Language: French

Beauty of the Night (French: La belle de nuit) is a 1934 French drama film directed by Louis Valray and starring Véra Korène, Aimé Clariond and Paul Bernard. It is based on a 1932 play of the same title by Pierre Wolff. The film's sets were designed by the art director Jean Lafitte.

== Synopsis ==
After finding out that his girlfriend is cheating on him with another man, a vengeful Claude finds a prostitute who strongly resembles her and tricks the lover into falling in love with her.

== Cast ==
- Véra Korène as Maryse Roy / Maïthé
- Aimé Clariond as Claude Davène
- Paul Bernard as Pierre Darfeuille
- Jacques Dumesnil as Jean Fournier
- Germaine Brière as Fernande
- Marguerite Marentie as Clara
- Nicole Martel as L'institutrice
- Andreals
- Marcelle Barry
- Fanny Lacroix
- Frédéric Mariotti
- Nizza Myris

== Bibliography ==
- Bessy, Maurice & Chirat, Raymond. Histoire du cinéma français: 1929-1934. Pygmalion, 1986.
- Crisp, Colin. Genre, Myth and Convention in the French Cinema, 1929-1939. Indiana University Press, 2002.
- Rège, Philippe. Encyclopedia of French Film Directors, Volume 1. Scarecrow Press, 2009.
