= The Volga Boatman (1936 film) =

- Directed by: Vladimir Strizhevsky
- Written by: Joseph Kessel (novel); Paul Bringuier
- Produced by: Herman Millakowsky
- Starring: Pierre Blanchar; Véra Korène; Charles Vanel
- Cinematography: Fédote Bourgasoff; Armand Thirard
- Music by: Michel Michelet
- Production company: Les Productions Milo Film
- Distributed by: Gallic Films
- Release date: 6 March 1936
- Running time: 91 minutes
- Country: France
- Language: French

The Volga Boatman (French: Les bateliers de la Volga) is a 1936 French drama film directed by Vladimir Strizhevsky and starring Pierre Blanchar, Véra Korène and Charles Vanel.

The film's sets were designed by the art directors Serge Piménoff and Pierre Schild.

== Cast ==
- Pierre Blanchar as Le lieutenant Vadime Borzine
- Véra Korène as Lydia Goreff
- Charles Vanel as Le colonel Goreff
- Valéry Inkijinoff as Kiro
- Raymond Aimos as Broïnka
- Léon Courtois
- Albert Duvaleix as Un batelier
- Pierre Labry as Kouproff
- Georges Marceau
- Jean Marconi as Le jeune officier
- Georges Prieur as Le juge
- Edouard Rousseau
- Maurice Tillet as Un batelier

== Bibliography ==
- Parish, Robert. Film Actors Guide. Scarecrow Press, 1977.
