= Knock (1933 film) =

1933 film

- Directed by: Roger Goupillières; Louis Jouvet
- Written by: Georges Neveux; Jules Romains
- Based on: Knock by Jules Romains
- Produced by: Georges Marret
- Starring: Louis Jouvet; Robert Le Vigan; Madeleine Ozeray
- Cinematography: Fédote Bourgasoff; René Colas
- Edited by: Jean Feyte
- Music by: Jean Wiener
- Production company: Les Productions Georges Marret
- Distributed by: Les Films Armor
- Release date: 3 November 1933
- Running time: 95 minutes
- Country: France
- Language: French

Knock is a 1933 French comedy film directed by Roger Goupillières and Louis Jouvet and starring Jouvet, Robert Le Vigan and Madeleine Ozeray. It was made at the Epinay Studios in Paris while Location shooting took place in Corrèze. The film's sets were designed by the art director Lucien Aguettand. It is based on the 1923 play Knock by Jules Romains. The play was adapted again for the 1951 film Dr. Knock.

== Cast ==
- Louis Jouvet as Dr. Knock
- Robert Le Vigan as Mousquet, le pharmacien
- Pierre Larquey as Le tambour de ville
- Madeleine Ozeray as Mariette
- Pierre Palau as Dr. Parpalaid
- Thérèse Dorny as La dame en violet
- Germaine Albert as Madame Parpalaid
- Romain Bouquet as Michalon
- Delacour as Le portier
- Marguerite Ducouret as Madame Rémy
- Christiane Jean as Une infirmière
- Jane Loury as Madame Mousquet
- Robert Moor as L'instituteur
- Iza Reyner as La dame en noir
- Alexandre Rignault as Le premier gars
- Rosen as Joseph
- Henri Saint-Isle as Le deuxième gars
- Sorges as Scipion
- Louis Zellas as Raffalens

== Bibliography ==
- Bessy, Maurice & Chirat, Raymond. Histoire du cinéma français: 1929-1934. Pygmalion, 1988.
- Crisp, Colin. Genre, Myth and Convention in the French Cinema, 1929-1939. Indiana University Press, 2002.
- Goble, Alan. The Complete Index to Literary Sources in Film. Walter de Gruyter, 1999.
- Rège, Philippe. Encyclopedia of French Film Directors, Volume 1. Scarecrow Press, 2009.
