= Egyptian Ella =

Song
- Language: English
- Songwriter: Walter Doyle

"Egyptian Ella" is a song composed in 1930 by Walter Doyle. It has been performed and recorded by many artists such as Ted Weems, Fats Waller and Milt Herth. A version of the song appears in the 1945 film Bring On The Girls.
