= Véra Korène =

French actress (1901–1996)

- Born: Rébecca Véra Korestzky; 6 June 1901; Bakhmut, Russian Empire (present day Ukraine)
- Died: 19 November 1996 (aged 95); Louveciennes, France
- Occupation: Actress
- Years active: 1922–1978

Véra Korène (6 June 1901 – 19 November 1996) was a Russian-born French actress and singer.

== Biography ==
Born Rébecca Véra Korestzky in the Russian Empire of Jewish heritage, she fled the Revolution and settled in Paris, France.

Using the Francized name Korène, she began her career in the theatre but also appeared in a number of films during the 1930s. A mainstay of the Parisian stage, in the 1950s she organized her own theatre production company, putting on performances at the Comédie Française. In 1956 she was named director of the Théâtre de la Renaissance, a position she held until 1978.

Véra Korène died in 1996 in Louveciennes in a senior citizen's home and was interred in the Cimetière de Pantin in the Parisian suburb of Pantin.

== Filmography ==
Year	Title	Role	Notes
1922	Son excellence le Bouif		
1933	The Faceless Voice	Estelle	
1934	Beauty of the Night	Maryse / Maïthé	
1935	Second Bureau	L'Espionne Erna Flieder	
1936	The Volga Boatman	Lydia Goreff	
1936	L'Argent	Hélène	
1936	Seven Men, One Woman	La comtesse Lucie de Kéradec	
1936	In the Service of the Tsar	Anna Raditsch	
1937	The Red Dancer	Tania Golgorine	
1937	Double Crime in the Maginot Line	Anna Bruchot	
1938	Tamara	Tamara	
1938	Café de Paris	Geneviève Lambert	
1939	Savage Brigade	Marie Kalitjeff	(final film role)
