= Monsieur Coccinelle =

- Directed by: Dominique Bernard-Deschamps
- Written by: Dominique Bernard-Deschamps
- Starring: Pierre Larquey; Jane Loury; Jeanne Provost
- Cinematography: Victor Arménise; Jean Bachelet; Jean Lallier
- Edited by: Raymonde Delor
- Music by: Daniel Rogers
- Production company: Films Coccinelle
- Distributed by: DisCina
- Release date: 2 November 1938
- Running time: 100 minutes
- Country: France
- Language: French

Monsieur Coccinelle is a 1938 French comedy film directed by Dominique Bernard-Deschamps and starring Pierre Larquey, Jane Loury and Jeanne Provost.

The film's sets were designed by Boris Bilinsky. The plot was based on an original story written by Bernard-Deschamps himself. It is notable for its break with conventional realism, with several scenes that push towards outright fantasy.

The film had trouble securing distribution and initially premiered at an art house venue. It was only during wartime, when it benefited from a national shortage of films, that it received a general release.

== Synopsis ==
An average worker who feels downtrodden at work and home, dreams of becoming a dictator. His aunt has her own fantasy that the love-of-her-life, a fairground magician, will return to her once more.

== Main cast ==
- Pierre Larquey as Alfred Coccinelle
- Jane Loury as Mélanie Coccinelle
- Jeanne Provost as La tante Aurore
- René Bergeron as Dutac
- Yette Lucas as Hortense Dupont
- Marcel Pérès as Brutus Dupont
- René Fluet as Un médecin
- Robert Moor as Un médecin
- Michèle Béryl as La vendeuse
- Robert Pizani as Illusio

== Bibliography ==
- Crisp, Colin. French Cinema—A Critical Filmography: Volume 1, 1929-1939. Indiana University Press, 2015.
