= Bring On the Girls (film) =

1945 film by Sidney Lanfield

Bring on the Girls
- Directed by: Sidney Lanfield
- Screenplay by: Karl Tunberg; Darrell Ware
- Based on: The Man Who Seeks the Truth; 1941 film by Pierre Wolff
- Produced by: associate Fred Kohlmar
- Starring: Veronica Lake; Sonny Tufts; Eddie Bracken; Marjorie Reynolds
- Cinematography: Karl Struss
- Edited by: William Shea
- Music by: Score: Robert Emmett Dolan; Songs: Jimmy McHugh (music); Harold Adamson (lyrics)
- Production company: Paramount Pictures
- Distributed by: Paramount Pictures
- Release date: March 30, 1945
- Running time: 92 minutes
- Country: United States
- Language: English

Bring On the Girls is a 1945 American musical comedy film directed by Sidney Lanfield and starring Eddie Bracken, Sonny Tufts and Veronica Lake. It is loosely based on the 1940 French comedy The Man Who Seeks the Truth.

== Plot ==
Wealthy Jay Newport Bates breaks off an engagement after discovering his fiancée is a gold digger. He joins the Navy anonymously but his family insist he be chaperoned by Phil North.

While on leave in Miami, Jay meets cigarette girl Teddy Collins, who once was engaged to Phil. When Teddy learns Jay is rich she flirts with him and he falls for her. Phil thinks Jay's new girl is Sue Thomas, a singer at the club.

== Cast ==
- Veronica Lake as Teddy Collins
- Sonny Tufts as Phil North
- Eddie Bracken as J. Newport Bates
- Marjorie Reynolds as Sue Thomas
- Johnny Coy as Benny Lowe
- Peter Whitney as Swede
- Alan Mowbray as August
- Grant Mitchell as Uncle Ralph
- Porter Hall as Dr. Efrington
- Thurston Hall as Rutledge
- Lloyd Corrigan as Beaster
- Sig Arno as Joseph
- June Foray as The Voice Of Parrot
- Huntz Hall as sailor
- Yvonne De Carlo as Hatcheck Girl

== Production ==
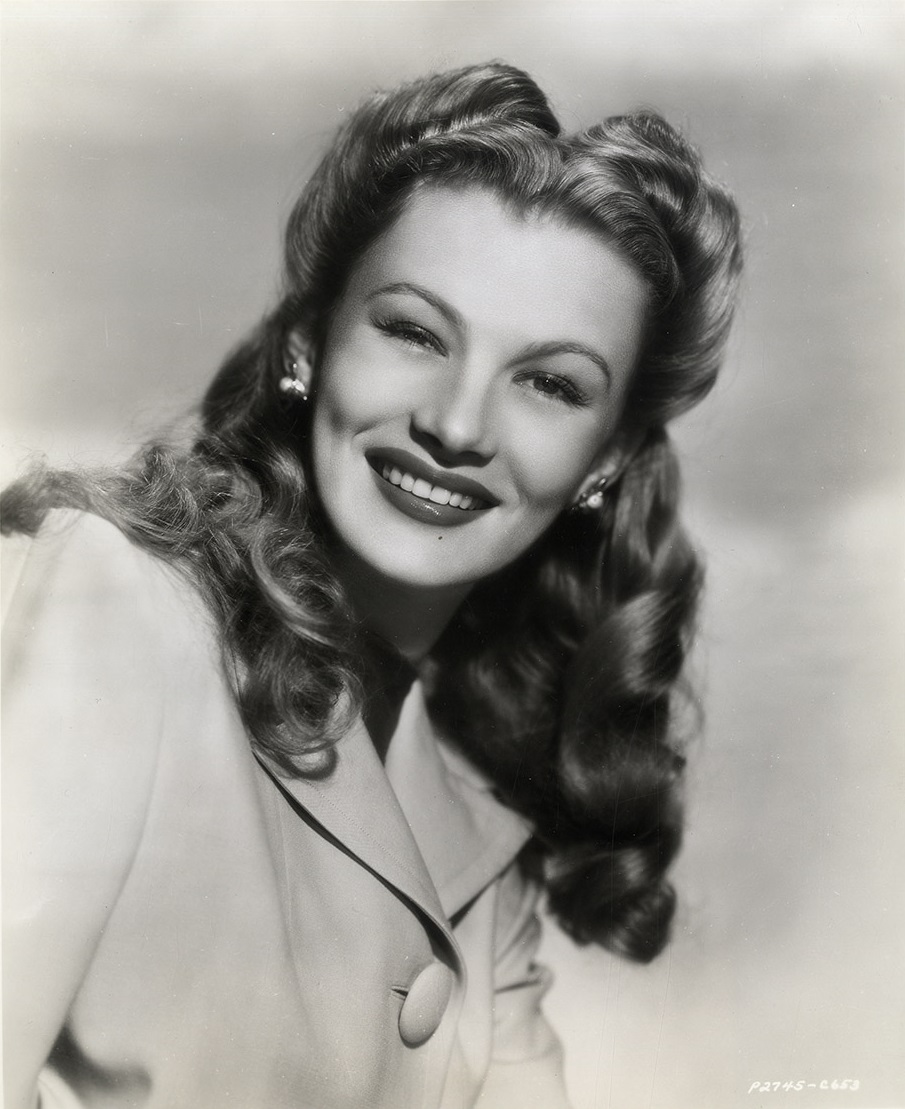
Veronica Lake publicity portrait for Bring on the Girls

The film was from the writers of the Bing Crosby musical Dixie. It marked Veronica Lake's return to the screen after an absence of several months, during which she had lost a child and been divorced. It was her first proper musical, although she had sung in This Gun for Hire and Star Spangled Rhythm.

Her original co-stars were to be Eddie Bracken and Dick Powell. Eventually Powell was replaced by Sonny Tufts.

Filming started in January 1944.

According to Diabolique magazine "After the debacle of The Hour Before Dawn and the traumas of her private life, Lake was carefully protected in this film – not given too much action, not having to carry the bulk of the plot, being cast in a role which is the variation of the one she played in I Wanted Wings – to wit, a gold-digging night club girl (though Lake doesn’t sing)."

== Songs ==
- Egyptian Ella
