= The Faceless Voice =

1933 film

- Directed by: Leo Mittler
- Written by: Jean Masson (novel); Alexandre Arnoux; Fred Bertrand
- Produced by: André Haguet
- Starring: Lucien Muratore; Véra Korène; Jean Servais
- Cinematography: Henri Janvier; Eugen Schüfftan
- Music by: Alexandre Arnoux; Michel Michelet
- Production company: Vandor Film
- Release date: 1 December 1933
- Country: France
- Language: French

The Faceless Voice (French: La voix sans visage) is a 1933 French drama film. It was directed by Leo Mittler, and starred Lucien Muratore, Véra Korène and Jean Servais.

== Plot ==
The singer Saltore is accused of murdering his wife's lover, and is sentenced to hard labor for ten years. He is proven innocent by his daughter, when she discovers that his wife who wanted to end an embarrassing affair, was the culprit.

== Cast ==
- Lucien Muratore as Pierre Saltore
- Véra Korène as Estelle
- Jean Servais as Gérard
- Simone Bourday as Jeanne
- Georges Flamant as André Sourdois
- Aimé Clariond as Maître Clément
- Max Maxudian as Le président
- Jean Gobet as Le domestique
- Henry Darbray as L'autre domestique
- Margo Lion as Une chanteuse
- Madeleine Guitty as Une invitée
- Odette Barencey
- Sylvia Bataille
- Véra Markels]
- Teddy Michaud

== Bibliography ==
- Dayna Oscherwitz & MaryEllen Higgins. The A to Z of French Cinema. Scarecrow Press, 2009.
