= Jeanne (1934 film) =

1934 film

- Directed by: Georges Marret
- Written by: Henri Duvernois
- Produced by: Georges Marret; Gaby Morlay
- Starring: Gaby Morlay; André Luguet; Hélène Perdrière
- Cinematography: Raoul Aubourdier; Harry Stradling Sr.
- Edited by: Jean Feyte
- Music by: Jean Wiener
- Distributed by: Les Distributeurs Français
- Release date: 30 November 1934
- Running time: 85 minutes
- Country: France
- Language: French

Jeanne is a 1934 French drama film directed by Georges Marret and starring Gaby Morlay, André Luguet and Hélène Perdrière. The film's sets were designed by the art director Eugène Lourié.

== Cast ==
- Gaby Morlay as Madeleine Préolier
- André Luguet as André Savignolle
- Hélène Perdrière as Evodie
- Robert Vattier as Charles Fuqui
- Sinoël as M. Vieuville
- Jeanne Lion as Mme. Savignole
- Andrée Ducret as Mme. Vieuville
- Nadia Sibirskaïa as La jeune fille
- Marcelle Barry as Charlotte
- Ariane Borg as Françoise
- Claire Gérard as Mme. Gageret
- Pierre Finaly as M. Gageret
- Julien Clément as Le médecin
- Jeanne Lamy
- Claude Borelli

== Bibliography ==
- Maurice Bessy, André Bernard & Raymond Chirat. Histoire du cinéma français: 1951-1955. Pygmalion, 1989.
