= Seven Men, One Woman =

1936 film

- Directed by: Yves Mirande
- Written by: Yves Mirande
- Produced by: Fred Bacos
- Starring: Fernand Gravey; Véra Korène; Pierre Larquey
- Cinematography: Charles Bauer
- Edited by: Roger Spiri-Mercaton
- Music by: Armand Bernard
- Production company: Paris Ciné Films
- Distributed by: Paris-Ciné-Films
- Release date: 28 August 1936
- Running time: 100 minutes
- Country: France
- Language: French

Seven Men, One Woman (French: Sept hommes, une femme) is a 1936 French romantic comedy film directed by Yves Mirande and starring Fernand Gravey, Véra Korène and Pierre Larquey. It was shot at the Joinville Studios of Paramount Pictures in Paris. The film's sets were designed by the art director René Renoux.

== Synopsis ==
The Countess Lucie de Kéradec is inconsolable when she is widowed. Then she discovers that her late husband was unfaithful to her. She considers remarriage and has a number of suitors. To test their personalities she decides to invite seven of them to her chateau and plans to whittle them down until she has found the right one.

== Cast ==
- Fernand Gravey as Brémontier
- Véra Korène as Countess Lucie de Kéradec
- Pierre Larquey as Langlois
- Roger Duchesne as de Villiers
- Saturnin Fabre as Derain
- Maurice Escande as Bizulier
- Félix Oudart as Barfleur
- Robert Arnoux as Vauxcouleur
- Jane Loury as La mère de Lucie
- Pierre Feuillère as Massa
- Simone Texier as Annette
- Charles Lemontier as Julien
- Doumel as Le patron de l'hôtel
- Georges Bever as Anatolz
- Claude Marty as Le bijoutier
- Emile Saulieu as Pierre
- Léonce Corne as L'huissier
- Georges Cahuzac as L'assistant
- Jane Lamy

== Bibliography ==
- Rège, Philippe. Encyclopedia of French Film Directors, Volume 1. Scarecrow Press, 2009.
