= Henri Duvernois =

French screenwriter

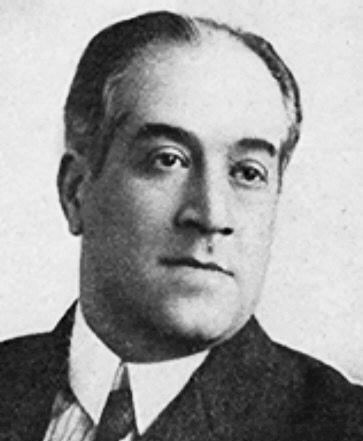
Henri Duvernois

Henri Duvernois (4 March 1875 in Paris - 30 January 1937 in Paris) was a French novelist, playwright and screenwriter.

== Filmography ==
- La Guitare et le Jazz-band, directed by Gaston Roudès (1923, based on the play La Guitare et le Jazz-band)
- Après l'amour, directed by Maurice Champreux (1924, based on the play After Love)
- Faubourg Montmartre, directed by Charles Burguet (1925, based on the novel Faubourg Montmartre)
- La Dame de bronze et le Monsieur de cristal, directed by Marcel Manchez (1929, based on the play La Dame de bronze et le Monsieur de cristal)
- Faubourg Montmartre, directed by Raymond Bernard (1931, based on the novel Faubourg Montmartre)
- When Love Is Over, directed by Léonce Perret (1931, based on the play After Love)
- La Poule, directed by René Guissart (1933, based on the novel La Poule)
- Jeanne, directed by Georges Marret, (1934, based on the play Jeanne)
- Les Soeurs Hortensias, directed by René Guissart (1935, based on the operetta Les Soeurs Hortensias)
- You Are Me, directed by René Guissart (1936, based on the operetta Toi, c'est moi)
- After Love, directed by Maurice Tourneur (1948, based on the play After Love)
- Maxime, directed by Henri Verneuil (1958, based on the novel Maxime)

=== Screenwriter ===
- On the Streets, directed by Victor Trivas (1933)
- The Scandal, directed by Marcel L'Herbier (1934)
- Last Hour, directed by Jean Bernard-Derosne (1934)
