= Joseph Bercholz =

French film producer

- Born: 4 January 1898; Russian Empire
- Died: 25 July 1981 (aged 83); Paris, France
- Occupation: Producer
- Years active: 1937-1967 (film)

Joseph Bercholz (1898–1981) was a Russian-born French film producer. In the 1930s he established the production company Les Films Gibé with Édouard Gide. During the Second World War he left for America where he produced a couple of films in Hollywood for Republic Pictures before returning to France to resume production.

== Selected filmography ==
- Return at Dawn (1938)
- Gargousse (1938)
- My Priest Among the Rich (1938)
- Abused Confidence (1938)
- Nine Bachelors (1939)
- The Man Who Seeks the Truth (1940)
- Behind City Lights (1945)
- Steppin' in Society (1945)
- Pastoral Symphony (1946)
- Savage Triangle (1951)
- Good Lord Without Confession (1953)
- Napoleon Road (1953)
- The Little Rebels (1955)
- Elena and Her Men (1956)
- Marie Antoinette Queen of France (1956)
- Love Is at Stake (1957)
- The Big Chief (1959)
- Guinguette (1959)
- Mandrin (1962)
- The Oldest Profession (1967)

== Bibliography ==
- Crisp, C.G. The Classic French Cinema, 1930-1960. Indiana University Press, 1993.
- Temple, Michael & Witt, Michael. The French Cinema Book. Bloomsbury Publishing, l 2019.
