= The Secret of Polichinelle (1923 film) =

1923 film

- Directed by: René Hervil
- Written by: René Hervil
- Based on: The Secret of Polichinelle by Pierre Wolff
- Produced by: Charles Delac; Marcel Vandal
- Starring: Andrée Brabant; Gabriel Signoret; Maurice de Féraudy
- Cinematography: Georges Asselin
- Production company: Film d'Art
- Distributed by: Etablissements Louis Aubert
- Release date: 2 November 1923
- Country: France
- Languages: Silent; French intertitles

The Secret of Polichinelle (French:Le secret de Polichinelle) is a 1923 French silent comedy film directed by René Hervil and starring Andrée Brabant, Gabriel Signoret and Maurice de Féraudy. It is based on a play by Pierre Wolff, and was remade as a sound film in 1936.

== Cast ==
- Andrée Brabant as Marie - la compagne
- Gabriel Signoret as Le docteur Trévoux
- Maurice de Féraudy as Monsieur Jouvenel - le père
- Jeanne Cheirel as Madame Jouvenel - la mère
- Catherine Fonteney
- Jean Dehelly as Henri Jouvenel - le fils
- Sigrist as L'enfant
- Carrel
- Émile Garandet as Le majordome

== Bibliography ==
- Maurice Bessy & Raymond Chirat. Histoire du cinéma français: 1935-1939. Pygmalion, 1987.
