= George Holland (actor) =

American actor

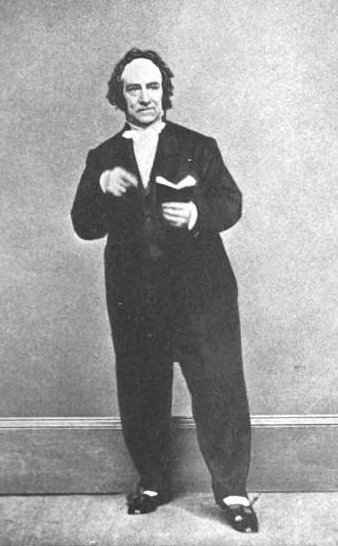
Image of George Holland, published 1913

George Holland (1791–1870) was an English American stage actor, born in London, 6 December 1791.

== Early life ==
His father was a tradesman. As a boy he was first sent to preparatory schools in Lambeth, and afterward to a boarding-school. He did not prove a devoted student; he was more remarkable for his pranks than for his proficiency in learning. Because of this Holland was taken home by his father and set to work in the silk and ribbon warehouse of Messrs. Hill & Newcombe, on Wood Street, in Cheapside, London. Prior to beginning to work, though, he had a six weeks long vacation during which he had his first experience on the stage at Astley's Amphitheatre. He was delighted by the activities that he experienced. His work with the silk mercers passed six months, selling silk and ribbons and "silk" hats, the latter articles having then only just come into fashion. Other ventures passed by, and at the age of nineteen George was apprenticed to Mr. Thomas Davison, of Whitefriars, to learn the trade of printer, and in a vain pursuit of skill in which vocation he spent two years. He was a vigorous young man who was a member of a boat club, he could—and frequently did—row from London Bridge to Richmond and back again, twenty miles (32 km) each way. Young Holland's way of life was unfit for the printing business, and when twenty-one years of age he was fortunate enough to get his indentures cancelled.

== Bobbin lace business ==
He went to Liverpool, then to Dublin in 1816, where, at the age of 25, he established a business to sell bobbin lace, manufactured in Nottingham. His shop was in Crow Street, Dublin, near the Crow Street Theatre, and immediately opposite a favourite haunt of jolly boys (topers), called Peter Kearney's Inn. Holland frequently resorted there, and made many theatrical acquaintances. The bobbin lace business lasted six months, after which Holland settled his affairs and returned to England to embark on a theatrical career which continued, through many vicissitudes of fortune, for the rest of his life.

== Acting on stage ==
The first engagement that Holland secured was made with Mr. Samuel Russell, familiarly known as "Jerry Sneak Russell," the stage-manager for Robert William Elliston. Following that engagement Elliston offered a second engagement at Birmingham Theatre. On 19 May 1817, the theatre opened with "Bertram" and "The Broken Sword," with him in the role of Baron in the latter play. His wig and cosmetics were not suited to the role that he was to portray and he was literally laughed and hooted from the stage. For a time after this misadventure the unlucky comedian was known as "Baron Holland;" he kept away from the stage for a while, yet after some time, Elliston reinstated him in the company, and he was made prompter. He soon became well known amongst stage actors, and associated with the best-known actors of the time.

In the season of 1825 – 26 Holland was engaged at the London Haymarket Theatre, under the management of T. P. Cooke; later he fulfilled an engagement at the Surrey Theatre; but his English career was drawing to a close. At Christmas, 1826, Junius Brutus Booth, then stage-manager of the Chatham Theatre, New York, sent a letter, offering him an American engagement. In the following year he accepted an engagement at the Bowery Theatre. In August 1827, in the ship Columbia, he sailed for New York.

== Stateside ==
The Bowery Theatre, - then called the New York Theatre, - was an important institution in the dramatic world when Holland came to America, and his appearance there, on 12 September 1827, attracted much attention. He acted in "A Day After the Fair," then a favorite farce, and he made a decided hit. It was a long time, though, before the comedian obtained a permanent position. For years after he arrived in America he led the nomadic life of his tribe. In 1829, he acted in theatres in the populous cities of the United States, such as Boston, Louisville, Cincinnati, Natchez, Vicksburg, Montgomery, Mobile, Philadelphia, Salem, and Providence. In June 1830, the comedian occupied what was known as "Holland's Cottage" at Yorkville, New York. That was a snug suburban inn, and one which enjoyed much favor.

== Always an employee ==
Holland, indeed, was always a popular man, and if his business capacity had kept pace with his professional success he would have gained a large fortune. That success never attended his efforts. As a worker he began, and to the last he lived in harness and ready to do his best. In 1831 – 32, along with a party of actors, he played at Augusta, Savannah, Charleston, and New Orleans. Holland's portion of the entertainment was entitled "Whims of a Comedian." It was a medley and it included feats of ventriloquism for which the actor was celebrated. "The whole of this performance," said the programme, "will be recited, acted, sung, and gesticulated by Mr. Holland alone." The bill of the play contained eight distinct features, and the price of admission was one dollar, a high price in those days.

From New Orleans the party went up the Mississippi and on to Pittsburgh. There Holland's engagement terminated. He then went to Cincinnati and to Louisville, and in association with N. M. Ludlow, gave entertainment in the principal towns of Kentucky and Tennessee. In company with other actors he performed at Nashville and New Orleans. This was "the cholera season of 1832," and the performances given by Holland exerted a cheering and reassuring influence over the public mind.

Holland was in New Orleans afterwards, in the post of private secretary to J. H. Caldwell and treasurer of the St. Charles Theatre. The season of 1835 – 36 began on 30 November 1835, with Charlotte Cushman as the star, playing Patrick, in "The Poor Soldier;" Helen Macgregor, in "Rob Roy;" Peter Wilkins, Lady Macbeth, and other parts. Holland had friendly relations with her and other theatrical luminaries. While at the St. Charles Theatre he enjoyed the most profitable time of his career. The St. Charles was destroyed by fire on 13 March 1842. Caldwell, the manager, survived his losses and was wealthy to the last, dying in New York in the autumn of 1863.

In the Olympic company of his old friend Mitchell, whom he had known since 1818 when both were members of De Camp's theatrical company, at Newcastle, he performed at New York from 1843 – 49, constantly acting and always a public favorite. He returned to New Orleans in 1849, where he enjoyed unmatched popularity. In 1855, he returned to New York, to Wallack's Theatre, appearing on 12 September as Chubb in John Brougham's "Game of Love." He remained connected with Wallacks, except for a brief time with Christy's Minstrels in 1857, until the end of 1867 – 1868. His last engagement was with Augustin Daly; his last professional appearance occurred on 12 January 1870 at the Fifth Avenue Theatre, as the Reporter, in Olive Logan's farcical comedy of "Surf." His last words on stage were uttered at a benefit play (Frou-Frou) for him on 16 May when he spoke three words: "God bless you!"

== Poverty, death and remembrance ==
George Holland was the father of a number of children. He is sometimes called "the Elder" to distinguish him from his son. He was the father to Joseph Holland, Edmund Milton Holland, and Kate Holland. He lived in poverty near the end of his life, and his death was expected. He died on 20 December 1870, at No. 309 Third Avenue, New York, aged 79.

His remains were not accepted at the church of the Rev. Dr. William T. Sabine, who refused to allow the funeral of an actor at his church. Dr. Sabine advised the family of Holland that "there is a little church around the corner where they do that sort of thing," meaning the Church of the Transfiguration, in East Twenty-ninth Street. It indeed remains a legend of an American story. As Joseph Jefferson famously known as Rip Van Winkle declared "All hail to the church around the corner." Mark Twain slammed Rev. Dr. Sabine in his writings.

Holland is interred in Cypress Hills Cemetery, Brooklyn, New York, in the American Dramatic Fund Association Plot.

== See also ==
- The Wallet of Time
