= The Man Who Seeks the Truth =

1940 film

- Film poster
- Directed by: Alexander Esway
- Written by: Pierre Wolff
- Produced by: Joseph Bercholz; Edouard Gide
- Starring: Raimu; Yvette Lebon; André Alerme
- Cinematography: Victor Arménise; Henri Janvier; Paul Portier
- Edited by: Maurice Serein
- Music by: Adolphe Borchard
- Production company: Les Films Gibé
- Distributed by: CCFC
- Release date: 20 March 1940
- Running time: 90 minutes
- Country: France
- Language: French

The Man Who Seeks the Truth (French: L'homme qui cherche la vérité) is a 1940 French comedy film directed by Alexander Esway and starring Raimu, Yvette Lebon and André Alerme. It was shot at the Neuilly Studios in Paris. The film's sets were designed by the art director Henri Ménessier. In 1945 it was loosely remade in Hollywood as Bring on the Girls starring Veronica Lake.

== Synopsis ==
In order to discover what his friends, family and colleagues really think about him Jean Vernet, a banker, feigns deafness so he can overhear conversations. He is shocked to discover that his previously happy existence is built on lies. Amongst them is the fact that his long-standing mistress Jacqueline is now the lover of his own godson Fernand.

== Cast ==
- Raimu as Jean Vernet
- Yvette Lebon as Gracieuse
- André Alerme as Victor
- Jacqueline Delubac as Jacqueline Diel
- Jean Mercanton as Fernand
- Gabrielle Dorziat as Adrienne
- Tramel as Lamblin, le caissier
- Jean Tissier as Leduc - le cinéaste
- Suzanne Dehelly as Madame Lamblin
- Nicolas Amato as Le maître d'hôtel
- Paul Escoffier
- René Génin as Un spécialiste
- Jacques Henley
- André Numès Fils
- Michele Olivier as La dame sourde
- Georges Paulais as Un spécialiste
- Robert Seller as Auguste
- Lydie Vallois
- Georges Bever as Petit rôle
- Léonce Corne as Le détective Ernest Duflaire
- Palmyre Levasseur as Emilie - la cuisinière
- Robert Rollis as Le livreur de pneumatique

== Bibliography ==
- Rège, Philippe. Encyclopedia of French Film Directors, Volume 1. Scarecrow Press, 2009.
