= Fernand Fabre =

French actor (1899–1987)

- Born: Fernand Louis Adelin Fabre; 7 November 1899; Salon-de-Provence, Bouches-du-Rhône, France
- Died: 19 January 1987 (aged 87); Paris, France
- Occupation: Actor
- Years active: 1926–1983 (film)

Fernand Fabre (1899–1987) was a French stage, television and film actor.

== Selected filmography ==
- Knock (1925)
- Miss Helyett (1928)
- The Queen's Necklace (1929)
- The Indictment (1931)
- Luck (1931)
- The Foreigner (1931)
- The Weaker Sex (1933)
- Madame Bovary (1934)
- A Man Has Been Stolen (1934)
- One Night's Secret (1934)
- Light Cavalry (1935)
- The Mysterious Lady (1936)
- The Man of the Hour (1937)
- Double Crime in the Maginot Line (1937)
- My Little Marquise (1938)
- Heroes of the Marne (1938)
- The New Rich (1938)
- Nights of Princes (1938)
- Colonel Chabert (1943)
- The Stairs Without End (1943)
- The Last Metro (1945)
- Special Mission (1946)
- After Love (1948)
- Three Investigations (1948)
- Bluebeard (1951)
- The Lovers of Bras-Mort (1951)
- The Crime of Bouif (1952)
- Arsène Lupin Versus Arsène Lupin (1962)

== Bibliography ==
- Goble, Alan. The Complete Index to Literary Sources in Film. Walter de Gruyter, 1999.
