= The Secret of Polichinelle (1936 film) =

1936 film

- Directed by: André Berthomieu
- Written by: Charles Spaak
- Based on: The Secret of Polichinelle by Pierre Wolff
- Produced by: Roger Richebé
- Starring: Raimu; Françoise Rosay; André Alerme
- Cinematography: Georges Benoît
- Edited by: Jean Mamy; Marthe Poncin
- Music by: Marcel Lattès
- Production company: Société des Films Roger Richebé
- Distributed by: Pathé Consortium Cinéma
- Release date: 7 February 1936
- Running time: 90 minutes
- Country: France
- Language: French

The Secret of Polichinelle (French: Le secret de Polichinelle) is a 1936 French comedy film directed by André Berthomieu and starring Raimu, Françoise Rosay and André Alerme. It is based on a play of the same name by Pierre Wolff, which had previously been turned into a silent film The Secret of Polichinelle (1923). It was shot at the Neuilly Studios in Paris. The film's sets were designed by the art director Jean Douarinou.

== Cast ==
- Raimu as M. Jouvenel
- Françoise Rosay as Mme Jouvenel
- André Alerme as M. Trévoux
- Janine Crispin as Marie
- Ginette Darcy
- Jeanne de Fava
- Jean Diéner
- Gaston Dubosc
- Vincent Hyspa
- Bernard Lancret as Henri Jouvenel
- Alain Michel as Le petit Robert Jouvenel
- Gaston Secrétan
- Made Siamé
- André Siméon

== Bibliography ==
- Dayna Oscherwitz & MaryEllen Higgins. The A to Z of French Cinema. Scarecrow Press, 2009.
