= The Secret of Polichinelle (play) =

1903 play

- Spanish translation
- Original language: French
- Written by: Pierre Wolff
- Genre: Comedy

Premiere
- Date: 3 January 1903
- Place: Théâtre du Gymnase, Paris

The Secret of Polichinelle (French: Le Secret de Polichinelle) is a 1903 comedy play by the French writer Pierre Wolff. A Boulevard farce it premiered at the Théâtre du Gymnase in Paris. It has been adapted into several different languages including English and Spanish. A 1904 American version was translated by Mildred Aldrich and staged at the Harlem Opera House.

== Synopsis ==
A respectable middle-class family discover that their adult son has had an illegitimate child with his mistress. Both husband and wife believe the other does not know and tries to keep it a secret from them.

== Film adaptations ==
It has been adaptated into films on several occasions including: a 1913 short film The Secret of Polichinelle directed by Henri Desfontaines, a 1923 silent film The Secret of Polichinelle directed by René Hervil and a 1936 sound film The Secret of Polichinelle directed by André Berthomieu. The same year a Swedish version The Family Secret was also produced, directed by Gustaf Molander.

== Bibliography ==
- Goble, Alan. The Complete Index to Literary Sources in Film. Walter de Gruyter, 1999.
- Mason, Hamilton. French Theatre in New York: A List of Plays, 1899-1939. Columbia University Press, 1940.
