= After Love (play) =

1924 play by Henri Duvernois and Pierre Wolff

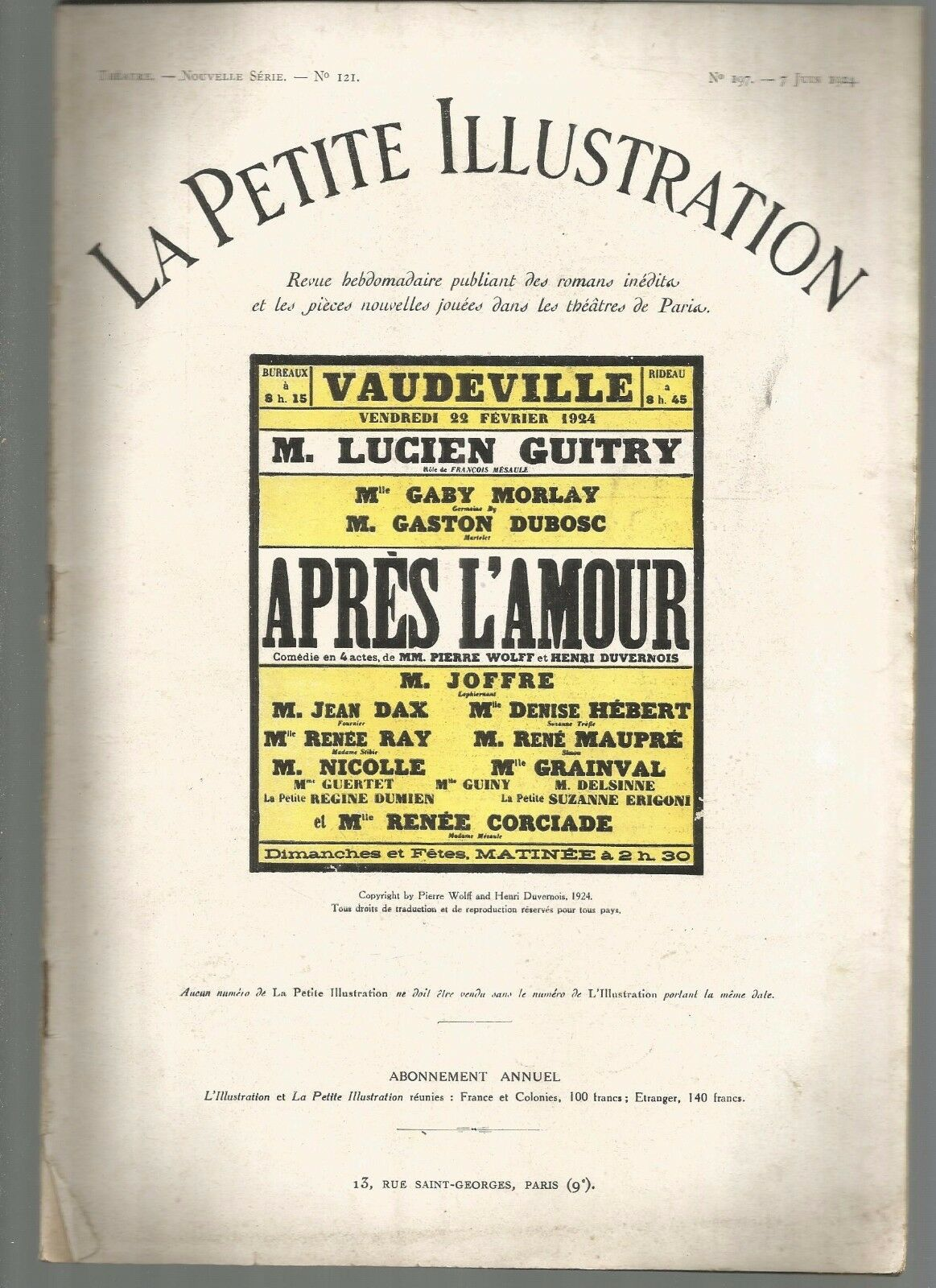
- Written by: Henri Duvernois, Pierre Wolff
- Original language: French
- Genre: Drama

Premiere
- Date premiered: 23 February 1924
- Place premiered: Théâtre du Vaudeville, Paris

After Love (French: Après l'amour) is a 1924 play by the French writers Henri Duvernois and Pierre Wolff.

A 1926 translation under the title Embers was staged at the Henry Miller Theatre on Broadway with a cast that included Ilka Chase, Leonard Mudie and Laura Hope Crews.

== Film adaptations ==
It has been turned into films on three occasions: a 1924 French silent film After Love directed by Maurice Champreux, a 1931 film When Love Is Over directed by Léonce Perret and 1948's After Love by Maurice Tourneur.

== Bibliography ==
- Goble, Alan. The Complete Index to Literary Sources in Film. Walter de Gruyter, 1999.
- Mason, Hamilton. French Theatre in New York: A List of Plays, 1899-1939. Columbia University Press, 1940.
