= When Love Is Over =

1931 film

- Directed by: Léonce Perret
- Written by: Léonce Perret
- Based on: After Love by Henri Duvernois and Pierre Wolff
- Starring: Gaby Morlay; Victor Francen; Tania Fédor
- Cinematography: Victor Arménise
- Music by: Ralph Erwin
- Production company: Pathé-Natan
- Distributed by: Pathé-Natan
- Release date: 4 December 1931
- Running time: 73 minutes
- Country: France
- Language: French

When Love Is Over (French: Après l'amour) is a 1931 French drama film directed by Léonce Perret and starring Gaby Morlay, Victor Francen and Tania Fédor. It is based on the 1924 play After Love by Henri Duvernois and Pierre Wolff.

== Cast ==
- Gaby Morlay as Germaine
- Victor Francen as Pierre Meyran
- Tania Fédor as Madame Meyran
- Nadine Picard as Madame Stivié
- Jacques Varennes as Robert Fournier
- Jean Joffre as Ferrand
- Henri Richard as Mertelet
- Raymond Guérin-Catelain as Gérard
- Claude Borelli as Petit garçon
- Jean Borelli as Petit garçon
- Jean Bara as Petit garçon
- Jacqueline Brizard as Trèfle
- Laurette Fleury
- Marcelle Monthil

== Bibliography ==
- Dayna Oscherwitz & MaryEllen Higgins. The A to Z of French Cinema. Scarecrow Press, 2009.
