= Jules Romains =

French poet and writer (1885–1972)

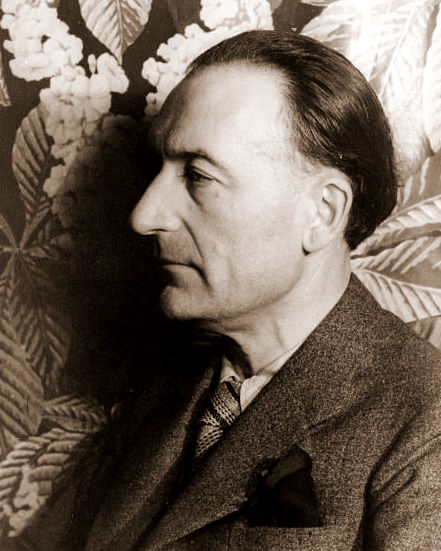
- Jules Romains, photo taken by Carl Van Vechten, 1936
- Born: Louis Henri Jean Farigoule; 26 August 1885; Saint-Julien-Chapteuil in the Haute-Loire
- Died: 14 August 1972 (aged 86); Paris
- Education: lycée Condorcet; École normale supérieure
- Occupations: Poet and writer
- Writing career
- Language: French
- Notable awards: elected to the Académie française
- Movement: Unanimism

President of PEN International
- In office October 1936 – October 1941
- Preceded by: H. G. Wells
- Succeeded by: Wartime International Presidential Committee (1941–47)

Jules Romains (born Louis Henri Jean Farigoule; 26 August 1885 – 14 August 1972) was a French poet and writer and the founder of the Unanimism literary movement. His works include the play Knock ou le Triomphe de la médecine, and a cycle of works called Les Hommes de bonne volonté (Men of Good Will). Sinclair Lewis called him one of the six best novelists in the world.

He was nominated for the Nobel Prize in Literature sixteen times.

== Life ==
Jules Romains was born in Saint-Julien-Chapteuil in the Haute-Loire but went to Paris to attend first the Lycée Condorcet and then the prestigious École Normale Supérieure. He was close to the Abbaye de Créteil, a utopian group founded in 1906 by Charles Vildrac and René Arcos, which brought together, among others, the writer Georges Duhamel, the painter Albert Gleizes and the musician Albert Doyen. He received his agrégation in philosophy in 1909.

In the interwar years, he pleaded the cause of pacifism and a united Europe against incipient fascism and despotism. In 1927, he signed a petition (that appeared in the magazine Europe on 15 April) against the law on the general organization of the nation in time of war, abrogating all intellectual independence and all freedom of expression. His name on the petition appeared with those of Lucien Descaves, Louis Guilloux, Henry Poulaille, Séverine ... and those of the young Raymond Aron and Jean-Paul Sartre from the École normale supérieure.

His novel The Boys in the Back Room (Les Copains, literally "the pals") appeared in English in 1937.

During World War II he went into exile first to the United States where he spoke on the radio through the Voice of America and then, beginning in 1941, to Mexico where he participated with other French refugees in founding the Institut Français d'Amérique Latine (IFAL).

A writer on many varied topics, Jules Romains was elected to the Académie française on 4 April 1946, occupying chair 12 (of 40). He served as President of PEN International, the worldwide association of writers from 1936 to 1941. In 1964, Jules Romains was named citizen of honor of Saint-Avertin. Following his death in Paris in 1972, his place in the Académie française was taken by Jean d'Ormesson.

He was criticized by writer and politician Aimé Césaire in the 1950 essay Discourse on Colonialism for racist statements by the title character of his novel Salsette Discovers America: "I will not even censure our Negroes and Negresses for chewing gum. I will only note ... that this movement has the effect of emphasizing the jaws, and that the associations which come to mind evoke the equatorial forest rather than the procession of the Panathenaea .... The black race has not yet produced, will never produce, an Einstein, a Stravinsky, a Gershwin."

== Unanimism ==
Jules Romains is remembered today, among other things, for his concept of Unanimism and his cycle of novels in Les Hommes de bonne volonté (The Men of Good Will), a remarkable literary fresco depicting the odyssey over a quarter century of two friends, the writer Jallez and politician Jerphanion, who provide an example in literature of Unanimism.

Romains originally considered unanimism to mean an opposition to individualism or to the exaltation of individual particularities, universal sympathy with life, existence and humanity. In later years, Romains defined it as connected with the end of literature within "representation of the world without judgment", where his social ideals comprise the highest conception of solidarity as a defense of individual rights. His first book was La vie unanime, published in 1904, and in the preface to Men of Goodwill he identified the ideas in it as essentially the same as those of that later work.

== In popular culture ==
The Red Envelope catalog company, in their 2007 Holiday catalog, surprisingly featured Les Createurs (the twelfth volume of Les Hommes de bonne volonté) on the cover in a photograph, showing a female model playfully frustrated with her husband, a male model posing as a detached intellectual, half-heartedly helping her to decorate the Christmas tree, while his attention is focused on reading Les Createurs.

== Works ==
=== Novel Series ===
- Men of Goodwill (Les Hommes de bonne volonté, 1932−1946; 28 volumes Paris: Calmann Lévy):
1. 6 October (1932)
2. Quinette's Crime (1932)
3. Childhood Loves (1932)
4. Eros of Paris (1932)
5. The Superbs (1933)
6. The Humble Ones (1933)
7. Searching for a Church (1934)
8. Province (1934)
9. Rise of Perils (1935)
10. The Powers (1935)
11. Recourse to the Abyss (1936)
12. The Creators (1936)
13. Mission to Rome (1937)
14. The Black Flag (1937)
15. Prelude to Verdun (1938)
16. Verdun (1938)
17. Vorge versus Quinette (1939)
18. The Sweetness of Life (1939)
19. That Great Light in the East (1941)
20. The World Is Your Adventure (1941)
21. Days in the Mountains (1942)
22. Works and Joys (1943)
23. Birth of the band (1944)
24. Appearances (1944)
25. The Magic Carpet (1946)
26. Françoise (1946)
27. 7 October (1946)
28. The Son of Jerphanion (1956)
- Psyche or The body's rapture Trilogy, London: John Lane, 1933
1. Lucienne (1922)
2. The God of Bodies (1928)
3. When the Ship... (1929)
- Madame Chauverel Trilogy (1957–60):
1. A Singular Woman (1957)
2. The Need for Clear Vision - Antonelli's Second Report (1958)
3. Memoirs of Madame Chauverel (2 volumes, 1959–60)

=== Standalone Novels ===
- The Death of a Nobody (Mort de quelqu'un, 1911)
- The Pals (1913)
- On the Quays of La Villette (Eugène Figuière, 1914)
- The Mill and the Hospice (1949)
- Salsette Discovers America, New York: Knopf, 1942
- Tussles with time (Violation de Frontières, 1951), London: Sidgwick & Jackson, 1952
- A Great Honest Man (1961)

=== Short Stories ===
- The Regenerated Village (1906)
- Powers of Paris (1911)
- Donogoo Tonka or the Miracles of Science (1920)
- The White Wine of La Villette (1923)
- Nomentanus the Refugee (1945)
- Bertrand de Ganges (1947)
- Portraits of Strangers (1962)

== Filmography ==
- Knock, directed by René Hervil (1925, based on the play Knock)
- Knock ou le triomphe de la médecine, directed by Roger Goupillières and Louis Jouvet (1933, based on the play Knock)
- Donogoo Tonka, directed by Reinhold Schünzel (1936, based on the play Donogoo)
  - Donogoo, directed by Reinhold Schünzel and Henri Chomette (1936, based on the play Donogoo)
- Dr. Knock, directed by Guy Lefranc (1951, based on the play Knock)
- Les Copains, directed by Yves Robert (1965, based on the novel Les Copains)
- Knock, directed by Lorraine Lévy and starring Omar Sy (2017, based on the play Knock)

=== Screenwriter ===
- The Portrait (1923), directed by Jacques Feyder (1923)
- Volpone, directed by Maurice Tourneur (1941)

== Bibliography ==
- Mauthner, Martin, Otto Abetz and His Paris Acolytes - French Writers Who Flirted with Fascism, 1930–1945. Liverpool University Press, 2016, (ISBN 978-1-84519-784-1)
- Jules-Romains, Lise, Les vie inimitables, Souvenirs, Paris: Flammarion, 1985.

Non-profit organization positions
Preceded by H. G. Wells	International President of PEN International; 1936–1939	Succeeded by Denis Saurat
