= Sigrist =

Sigrist is a surname. Notable people with the surname include:

- Mark Sigrist, American politician
- Mike Sigrist, American Magic: The Gathering player
- Séverine Sigrist (born 1973), French cellular biologist, neuroscientist and company founder
- Shannon Sigrist (born 1999), Swiss ice hockey player
- Frederick Sigrist, Aviation pioneer, co-founder of H.G.Hawker, later Hawker Aircraft Ltd.Father of heiress Fredericka Ann (Bobo) Sigrist

== See also ==
- Reid and Sigrist, former English engineering company
- Sigerist
