= Brown of Harvard =

Brown of Harvard is the title of three silent films all based on the 1906 Broadway play of the same name by Rida Johnson Young. The 1926 version is notable for featuring John Wayne's screen debut.

- Brown of Harvard (1911 film)
- Brown of Harvard (1918 film)
- Brown of Harvard (1926 film)

== See also ==
- Roger Brown (psychologist) (1925–1997), former professor at Harvard University
