= Raffles, the Amateur Cracksman (1917 film) =

1917 film by George Irving

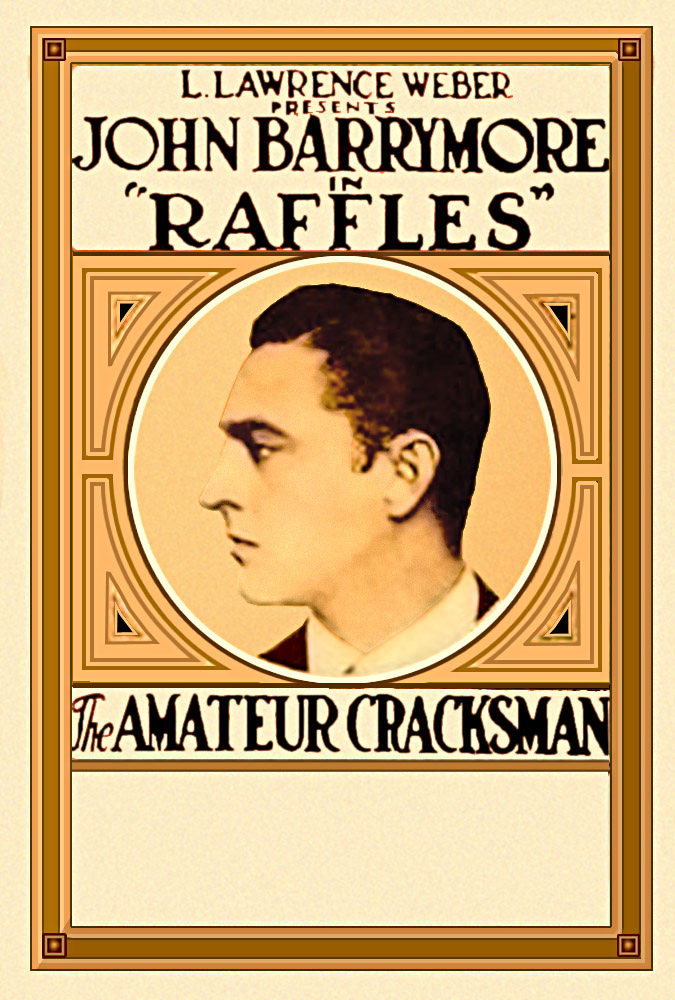
- 1917 theatrical poster
- Directed by: George Irving
- Written by: Anthony P. Kelly (scenario)
- Based on: The Amateur Cracksman; 1899 novel by E. W. Hornung Eugene Wiley Presbrey (1906 play)
- Produced by: L. Lawrence Weber
- Starring: John Barrymore; Evelyn Brent; Frank Morgan; Mike Donlin; Christine Mayo
- Cinematography: Harry B. Harris
- Production companies: Hyclass Producing Company; L. Lawrence Weber Photo Dramas
- Distributed by: Hiller & Wilk (on State's Rights basis)
- Release date: December 1917
- Running time: 70 minutes
- Country: United States
- Language: Silent (English intertitles)

Raffles, feature film

Raffles, the Amateur Cracksman is a 1917 American silent film starring John Barrymore and Evelyn Brent. The movie also co-stars Frank Morgan and Mike Donlin, and was directed by George Irving. The film has been released on DVD.

== Plot ==
As described in a film magazine, A. J. Raffles (Barrymore), a highly educated crook with entree to the best social circles, steals for the love of it and the thrill of the chase, enjoying outwitting the police and amateur detectives. An international swindler who has possession of a priceless "rose pearl" takes passage on a steamship and Raffles does likewise. Miles from land, Raffles determines that the swindler has hidden the pearl in a cavity in his shoe. After getting the pearl, Raffles empties a cartridge from his revolver and puts the pearl inside. There is an outcry over the theft, and on searching Raffles' cabin, a ship's officer takes the gun and removes all of the cartridges. Raffles grabs the cartridges and places them in his mouth and then jumps overboard, swimming to land. During his escape he was seen by Mrs. Vidal (Mayo), an English society woman with whom he had been flirting. Raffles reappears in London, mixing with the upper class, where he is recognized by Mrs. Vidal. She falls in love with him and attempts to force him to love her by threatening to tell of his past theft. Raffles defies her. The famous diamond necklace of Lady Melrose (Brundage) disappears while Raffles is a guest of the house. Mrs. Vidal immediately suspects that Raffles is the thief and again threatens to expose him, but he laughs at her. George Bedford (Perry), an amateur detective, declares that he will find the thief responsible for the Melrose robbery and even makes a bet with Raffles that the thief will be arrested. Bedford is sure that Raffles is the thief. Raffles then uses some ingenious methods to get the diamond necklace out of his possession, but still have it at his disposal when needed. Finally, after Bedford loses the bet, and gives Raffles his winnings of £150, which Raffles passes on to Bunny to cover a bouncing cheque Bunny had made out, Bedford tries to arrest Raffles. But Raffles gets away, and Bedford says he's pleased.

== Cast ==
- John Barrymore as A. J. Raffles
- Evelyn Brent as Ethel, Lord Amersteth's Daughter
- Frank Morgan as Bunny Manders
- Mike Donlin as Crawshay
- Christine Mayo as Mrs. Vidal
- Kathryn Adams as Gwendolyn, Lord Amersteth's Ward
- Dudley Hill as Crawley (credited as Dudley S. Hill)
- H. Cooper Cliffe as Lord Amersteth
- Mathilde Brundage as Lady Melrose (credited as Mrs. Mathilde Brundage)
- Frederick Perry as George Bedford
- Nita Allen as Marie

== Production ==
The film is set in England and was filmed in Livingston, Staten Island, New York. There are scenes filmed at the Staten Island Cricket Club.

== Reception ==
Like many American films of the time, Raffles, the Amateur Cracksman was subject to cuts by city and state film censorship boards. For example, the Chicago Board of Censors required cuts, in Reel 1, of the intertitle "Relieving such as he of their ill-gotten gain would be an ideal occupation", closeup of stealing pearl from slipper, hiding pearl in empty cartridge, Reel 2, the intertitle "He strolled through life taking from the rich to give to the poor", Reel 4, maid taking key from under pillow and stealing necklace, closeup views of tearing man's mouth(*these scenes are extant in surviving prints that weren't censored), two closeups of biting hand, Reel 5, two intertitles "Oh Bunny, there is nothing equal to it, your very life hangs in the balance" and "I've never stolen a farthing for personal gain. I've robbed the rich to give to the poor", Reel 6, the intertitle "Get the sparklers and be quick about it", and holdup scenes before and after.

A photo in Daniel Blum's Pictorial History of the Silent Screen c.1953 has Raffles escaping pursuers through an opening in a large Grandfather clock which covers a doorway. The scene however is not in any of the surviving prints of the film. The picture may have also been staged just for publicity purposes.

== See also ==
- Raffles, the Amateur Cracksman (1925)
- Raffles (1930)
- Raffles (1939)
