= My Aunt from Honfleur (1923 film) =

1923 film directed by Robert Saidreau

- Directed by: Robert Saidreau
- Based on: My Aunt from Honfleur by Paul Gavault
- Produced by: Henri Diamant-Berger
- Starring: Jane Loury; Armand Bernard; Marcel Vallée
- Cinematography: René Guichard
- Production company: Les Films Diamant
- Distributed by: Agence Générale Cinématographique
- Release date: 16 November 1923
- Running time: 60 minutes
- Country: France
- Languages: Silent; French intertitles

My Aunt from Honfleur (French: Ma tante d'Honfleur) is a 1923 French silent comedy film directed by Robert Saidreau and starring Jane Loury, Armand Bernard and Marcel Vallée. It is based on the 1914 play My Aunt from Honfleur by Paul Gavault.

== Cast ==
- Mary Belson as Yvonne
- Armand Bernard as Armand Berthier
- Pierre Etchepare as Adolphe Dorlage
- Jane Loury as Madame Raymond - la tante d'Honfleur
- Charles Martinelli as Monsieur Dorlange
- Louis Pré Fils as Le docteur Douce
- Marcel Vallée as Clément - le valet de chambre
- Peggy Vère as Albertine
- Irène Wells as Lucette
- Jean Joffre

== Bibliography ==
- Goble, Alan. The Complete Index to Literary Sources in Film. Walter de Gruyter, 1999.
