= Edmund Milton Holland =

American comedian (1848–1913)

Edmund Holland
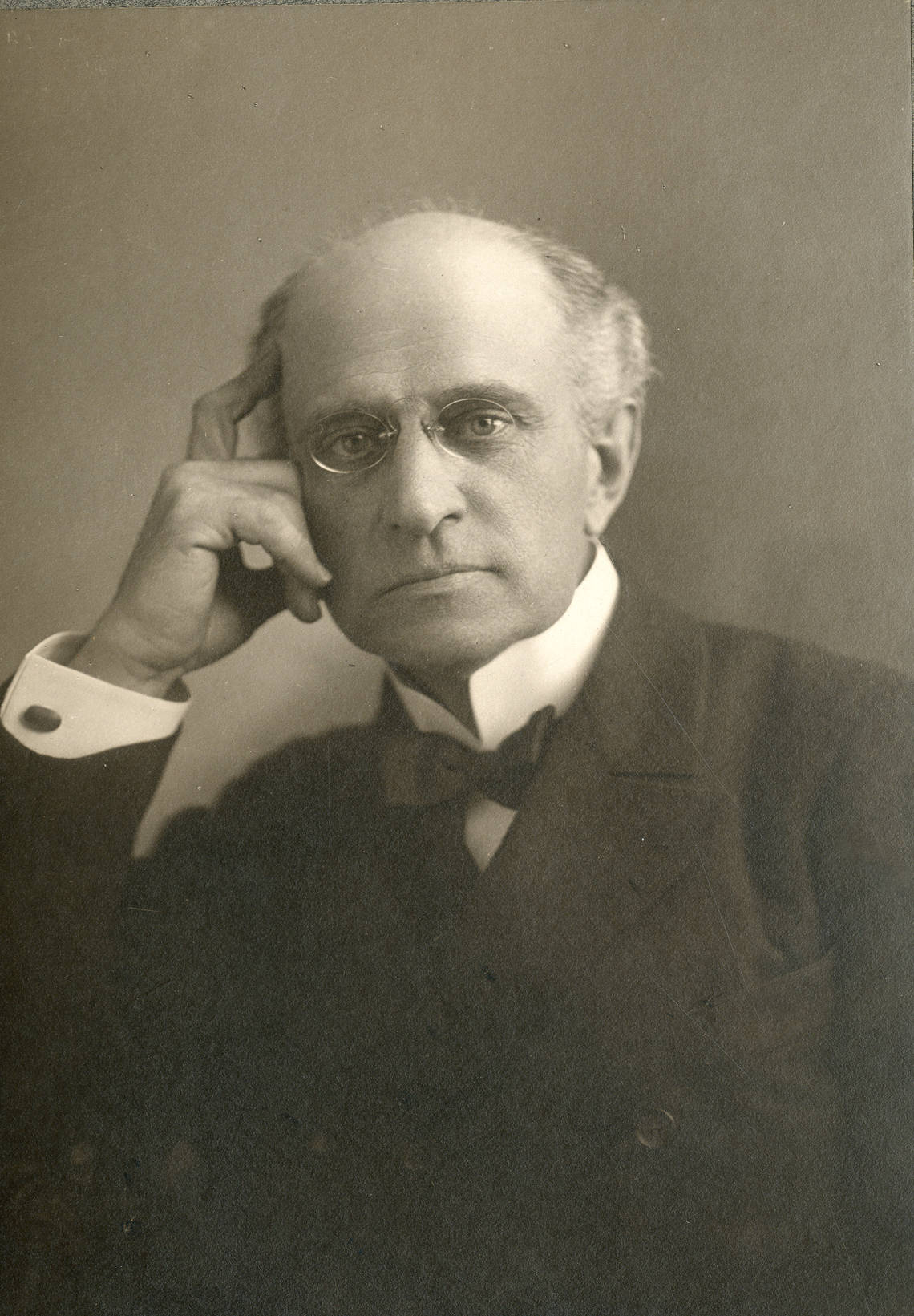
- E. M. Holland

Shepherd of The Lambs
- In office 1890–1891
- Preceded by: John R. Brady
- Succeeded by: Clay M. Greene

Personal details
- Born: Edmund Milton Holland; September 7, 1848 New York City, U.S.
- Died: November 24, 1913 (aged 65) Cleveland, Ohio, U.S.
- Resting place: Kensico Cemetery, Valhalla, NY
- Spouse: Emily Seward (? - 1913, his death)
- Children: 2, including Edna Holland
- Parent: George Holland (father)
- Occupation: Actor * Comedian

Edmund Milton Holland (September 7, 1848 – November 24, 1913) was an American actor and comedian. Holland was a charter member of The Lambs in 1877 and served as shepherd (president) from 1890-1891.

== Biography ==
He was born in New York City on September 7, 1848, the son of well-known English American stage actor George Holland. He appeared upon the stage in childhood, but his regular professional career began in 1866 at Barnum's Museum. The next year, under the name of Mr. E. Milton, he became a member of Wallack's company, with which he played successfully in The Road to Ruin, Caste, and other pieces until 1880. After an interval, during which he made a tour in England, he was engaged in 1882 at the Madison Square Theatre. Among his characters in the years that followed were:

- Pittacus Green in Hazel Kirke
- Old Rogers in Esmerelda
- Captain Redwood in Jim the Penman
- Lot Burden in Saints and Sinners
- Colonel Carter in Colonel Carter of Cartersville, at Palmer's Theatre

Beginning in 1895, he and his brother Joseph starred for two years in A Social Highwayman and other plays. In 1901–02 he played the title rôle in Eben Holden, and from 1903 to 1906 he played Captain Bedford in Raffles, the Amateur Cracksman. In 1909 he joined the New Theatre Company, of which he remained a member till 1911, playing, among other parts:

- Sir Oliver Surface in The School for Scandal
- Canon Bonington in Don
- Mr. Elkin in The Thunderbolt
- Gaffer Tyl in The Blue Bird
- Baron Von Haugh in Old Heidelberg
- Metz in Years of Discretion at the Belasco Theatre in 1912.

Holland was married to actress Emily Seward. Their daughter, Edna Holland, was an actress. They also had a son, Joseph Holland.

He died in Cleveland, Ohio on November 24, 1913, of heart disease. Holland is interred in the family plot in Kensico Cemetery in Valhalla, Westchester County, New York. The pallbearers at his funeral included playwrights Clay M. Greene, Joseph R. Grismer, and Augustus Thomas; and actors Francis Wilson, John Drew Jr., DeWolf Hopper and William Courtleigh.
