= Georges Marret =

Georges Marret (? - 9 May 1937), was a French film producer and film director.

== Filmography ==
=== Producer ===
- 1931: Jean de la Lune by Jean Choux
- 1932: Suzanne (1932 film) by Léo Joannon and Raymond Rouleau
- 1933: Knock by Roger Goupillières and Louis Jouvet
- 1934: Jeanne

=== Director ===
- 1934: Jeanne

=== Scriptwriter ===
- 1938: La Goualeuse by Fernand Rivers, with Lys Gauty, cowriter
