= Love Cavalcade =

Cavalcade d'amour
- Directed by: Raymond Bernard
- Written by: Jean Anouilh; Jean Aurenche
- Produced by: Arnold Pressburger
- Cinematography: André Germain; Robert Lefebvre
- Edited by: Charlotte Guilbert
- Music by: Roger Desormière; Arthur Honegger; Darius Milhaud
- Production company: Pressburger Films
- Release date: 17 January 1940 (Paris)
- Running time: 100 min
- Country: France
- Language: French

Love Cavalcade (French: Cavalcade d'amour) is a 1940 French film, directed by Raymond Bernard and written by Jean Anouilh.

== Plot ==
Three episodes show how the owners of a certain French castle experience dramatic issues with their love interests. The plot spans three centuries.

== Cast ==
- Claude Dauphin : Léandre, Hubert & Georges
- Michel Simon : Diogène, Monseigneur de Beaupré & Lacouret
- Janine Darcey : Julie
- Simone Simon : Juliette
- Corinne Luchaire : Junie
- Saturnin Fabre : Lacouret
- Alfred Baillou : Un comédien
- Charles Vissières : Le maître d'hôtel
- Marcel Melrac : L'employé du gaz
- Jacques Castelot : Un danseur
- Pierre Labry : Le baron de Maupré
- Trubsky : Le marquis de Longuyon
- Henri Richard : Anthelme
- Christian Argentin : Le chapelin
- Henri Monteux : Joseph
- Hubert Daix : an actor
- Blanchette Brunoy : Léonie de Maupré
- Dorville : father of Junie
- Léon Larive : cook
- Milly Mathis : nurse

== Music ==
Music for the film was composed by Roger Désormière, Arthur Honegger, and Darius Milhaud. Milhaud later adapted his music for La cheminée du roi René for wind quintet.
