= After Love (1948 film) =

1948 film directed by Maurice Tourneur

- Directed by: Maurice Tourneur
- Written by: Jean Bernard-Luc; Jacques Natanson
- Based on: After Love by Henri Duvernois and Pierre Wolff
- Produced by: Emile Natan
- Starring: Pierre Blanchar; Simone Renant; Giselle Pascal
- Cinematography: Armand Thirard
- Edited by: Christian Gaudin
- Music by: Marc Lanjean
- Production company: Les Films Modernes
- Distributed by: Les Films Osso
- Release date: 22 January 1948
- Running time: 95 minutes
- Country: France
- Language: French

After Love (French: Après l'amour) is a 1948 French drama film directed by Maurice Tourneur and starring Pierre Blanchar, Simone Renant and Giselle Pascal. The film is based on the 1924 play of the same title by Henri Duvernois and Pierre Wolff which has been adapted for the screen a number of times. Tourneur shot it in five weeks and came in under budget. It was the director's penultimate film, followed by Dilemma of Two Angels the same year.

The film's sets were designed by the art director's Paul-Louis Boutié and Guy de Gastyne.

== Synopsis ==
Betrayed by his wife, a teacher proceeds to have an affair with a young and pretty student. The two women both find themselves expecting a child. The girl dies during childbirth. In a spirit of revenge and to keep his real son, the scorned husband exchanges the babies.

== Cast ==
- Pierre Blanchar as François Mézaule
- Simone Renant as Nicole Mézaule
- Giselle Pascal as Germaine
- Gabrielle Fontan as Catou
- Germaine Ledoyen as La soeur de Germaine / Sister
- Nicole Chollet as La bonne
- Claire Gérard as L'invitée
- Marcel Melrac as Le propriètaire
- René Hell as Le marchand de violettes
- Paul Denneville as Le vieux journaliste
- Jean-Jacques Duverger as Henri
- Serge Canda
- Fernand Fabre as Fournier
- Léon Arvel as Le médecin
- Cecil Baur
- Alain Clairfond
- Lucien Dorval
- Lucien Jeunesse
- Lisette Lebon
- Lucienne Legrand
- Michel Lemoine
- Palmyre Levasseur as La voisine
- Jacques Vertan

== Bibliography ==
- Waldman, Harry. Maurice Tourneur: The Life and Films. McFarland, 2001.
