= Dr. Knock (1951 film) =

1951 film by Guy Lefranc

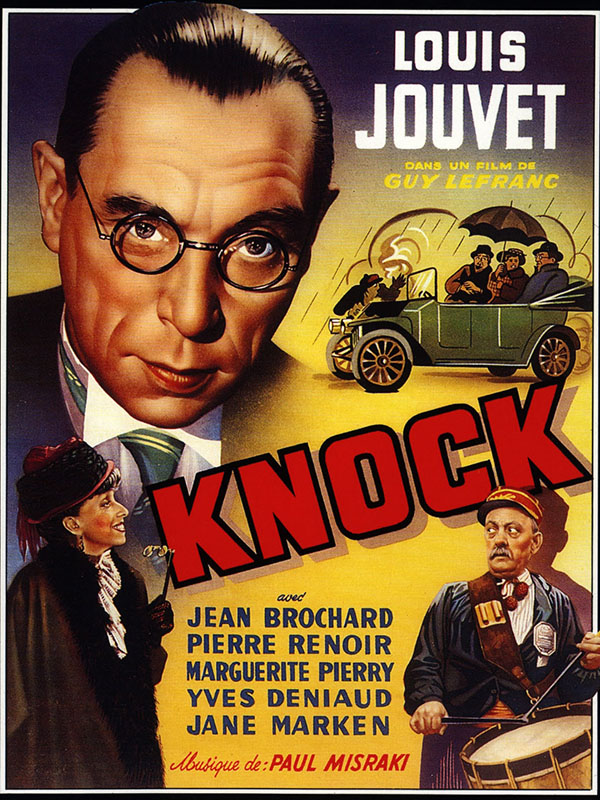
- Film poster
- Directed by: Guy Lefranc
- Written by: Georges Neveux; Jules Romains
- Produced by: Léon Canel
- Starring: Louis Jouvet; Louis de Funès
- Music by: Paul Misraki
- Distributed by: La Société des Films Sirius (1951) (France); Martin Lewis (1955) (USA)
- Release date: 21 March 1951 (France)
- Running time: 98 minutes
- Country: France
- Language: French

Dr. Knock (original title Knock) is a French comedy film from 1951, directed by Guy Lefranc, written by Georges Neveux, and starring Louis Jouvet. It also features an uncredited appearance by Louis de Funès. The movie is based on Doctor Knock by Jules Romains which premiered under its French title, Knock ou le Triomphe de la médecine, in 1923.

The film was remade in 2017 under the title Knock.

== Summary ==
The ambitious Dr. Knock arrives in the country village Saint-Maurice to succeed Dr. Parpalaid, an honest man whose patients are rare. The health of the villagers is excellent. Realizing that he was duped by his predecessor, Dr. Knock sets about convincing everyone that a healthy person is someone who doesn't know how sick he is. As a result, the whole village takes to bed, the hotel is transformed into a clinic, and even Dr. Parpalaid, who temporarily returns to his village, is so worried about his health following the "diagnosis" of Dr. Knock that he also ends up in bed.

== Cast ==
- Louis Jouvet: Dr. Knock
- Jean Brochard: Dr. Albert Parpalaid
- Pierre Renoir: Mousquet (the chemist)
- Pierre Bertin: Bernard (the teacher)
- Marguerite Pierry: Mrs. Pons (the lady in purple)
- Jean Carmet: a guy
- Yves Deniaud: the tambourine
- Mireille Perrey: Mrs. Rémy
- Jane Marken: Mrs. Parpalaid
- Louis de Funès (uncredited)
