= Raffles, the Amateur Cracksman (1925 film) =

1925 film

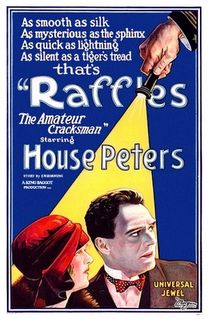
- 1925 theatrical poster
- Directed by: King Baggot
- Written by: Harvey F. Thew
- Based on: The Amateur Cracksman; 1899 novel by E. W. Hornung Eugene Wiley Presbrey (1906 play)
- Produced by: Universal Jewel (production company)
- Starring: House Peters; Miss DuPont; Hedda Hopper; Fred Esmelton; Walter Long
- Cinematography: Charles J. Stumar
- Distributed by: Universal Pictures
- Release date: May 24, 1925
- Running time: 60 minutes (6 reels)
- Country: United States
- Language: Silent (English intertitles)

Raffles, the Amateur Cracksman (1925) is a feature length silent adventure crime drama/romance motion picture starring House Peters, Miss DuPont, Hedda Hopper, Fred Esmelton, and Walter Long.

Directed by King Baggot and produced by Carl Laemmle's Universal Pictures, the screenplay was adapted by Harvey F. Thew from the play by Eugene W. Presbrey and the 1899 short story collection, The Amateur Cracksman, by E.W. Hornung.

== Background ==
The play on which the film was based was written by E.W. Hornung and Eugene Presbrey. A successful production played at the Princess Theatre in New York from 27 October 1903 for 168 performances before touring. Raffles was played by Kyrle Bellew and Manders by Stanton Elliot.

== Plot ==
Raffles (played by House Peters) is an English gentleman with a secret life—he is the notorious jewel thief known as "The Amateur Cracksman." While sailing from India to England accompanied by his friend, Bunny Manners (played by Freeman Wood), it is rumored that the infamous cracksman is aboard ship. Raffles warns a lady passenger to keep an eye on her necklace, which is stolen soon afterward. Although a search reveals no evidence, the necklace is returned upon reaching London.

Lord Amersteth (played by Winter Hall) and his wife, Lady Amersteth (played by Kate Lester), are having a party at their home and Raffles attends. Another guest, noted criminologist Captain Bedford (played by Fred Esmelton), makes the assertion that a very valuable string of pearls cannot be stolen. Encouraged by this, Raffles steals it.

He has also stolen the heart of Gwendolyn Amersteth (played by Miss DuPont), the daughter of his hosts. Capt. Bedford finally captures him, but he escapes with Gwendolyn's help and they run away to be married. Raffles returns the pearls and promises to retire from being a burglar.

== Cast ==
- House Peters as Raffles, the Amateur Cracksman
- Miss DuPont as Gwendolyn Amersteth
- Hedda Hopper as Mrs. Clarice Vidal
- Fred Esmelton as Capt. Bedford
- Walter Long as Crawshay
- Winter Hall as Lord Amersteth
- Kate Lester as Lady Amersteth (posthumous appearance)
- Freeman Wood as Bunny Manners
- Roland Bottomley as Lord Crowley
- Lillian Langdon as Mrs. Tilliston
- Robert Bolder as Mr. Tilliston
