= The Masked Woman (1924 film) =

1924 film directed by Viktor Tourjansky

- Directed by: Viktor Tourjansky
- Written by: Viktor Tourjansky
- Starring: Nathalie Kovanko; René Maupré; Jeanne Brindeau
- Cinematography: Albert Duverger; Joseph-Louis Mundwiller; Nikolai Toporkoff
- Production company: Films Albatros
- Distributed by: Films Armor
- Release date: 21 November 1924
- Running time: 97 minutes
- Country: France
- Languages: Silent; French intertitles

The Masked Woman (French: La dame masquée) is a 1924 French silent crime drama film directed by Viktor Tourjansky and starring Nathalie Kovanko, René Maupré and Jeanne Brindeau. The film's sets were designed by the art directors Eduardo Gosch and Alexandre Lochakoff.

The costume for Nathalie Kovanko was made by Lucie Schwob (Claude Cahun).

== Cast ==
- Nathalie Kovanko as Hélène Tesserre
- René Maupré as Jean
- Jeanne Brindeau as Madame Doss
- Nicolas Koline as Uncle Michel
- Nicolas Rimsky as Li - the Chinese
- Sylvio De Pedrelli as Girard
- Madame Alama as Mrs. Tesserre
- Boris de Fast as Robin

== Bibliography ==
- Albera, François. Albatros: des russes à Paris, 1919–1929. Mazzotta, 1995.
- Krautz, Alfred. International Directory of Cinematographers Set and Costume Designers in Film: France. Saur, 1983.
