= Orderly (disambiguation) =

An orderly is a hospital attendant whose job consists of assisting medical staff with various medical interventions.

Orderly may also refer to:

- Batman (military), also known as an orderly—a soldier or airman assigned to a commissioned officer as a personal servant
  - In the United States Air Force, the title of Bay Orderly refers to airmen temporarily assigned to help clean and maintain the community areas of the dormitories during the duty day.

== Film and TV ==
- The Orderly, a 1918 American film
- The Orderly (1933 film), a French film directed by Victor Tourjansky
- The Orderly (1961 film), an Italian film starring Vittorio De Sica

The Orderlies, fictional hexagonal-mouthed humanoids with grilled mouths who serve the Shakri in the Doctor Who episode The Power of Three.
