= Ramuntcho (disambiguation) =

Ramuntcho is an 1897 novel by French author Pierre Loti.

Ramuntcho may also refer to:

- Ramuntcho (1919 film)
- Ramuntcho (1938 film)
- Ramuntcho (1959 film)
- Ramuntcho (Pierné)
- Ramuntcho (Taylor), a 1942 opera by Deems Taylor
