= Gloria (1931 French-language film) =

1931 film

- Directed by: Hans Behrendt; Yvan Noé
- Written by: Georg C. Klaren; Hans Székely; Yvan Noé
- Produced by: Bernard Natan; Emile Natan; Marcel Hellmann
- Starring: Brigitte Helm; André Luguet; Jean Gabin
- Cinematography: Frederik Fuglsang
- Music by: Hans J. Salter
- Production companies: Matador-Film; Pathé-Natan
- Distributed by: Pathé-Natan
- Release date: 30 October 1931
- Running time: 85 minutes
- Countries: France; Germany
- Language: French

Gloria is a 1931 French-German drama film directed by Hans Behrendt and Yvan Noé and starring Brigitte Helm, André Luguet and Jean Gabin. A co-production between France and Germany, a separate German version Gloria was also made. Such multiple-language versions were common during the early years of sound before dubbing became more widespread.

== Cast ==
- Brigitte Helm as Véra Latour
- André Luguet as Pierre Latour
- André Roanne as Bob Deschamps
- Jean Gabin as Robert Nourry
- Mady Berry as Thérèse
- Jean Boulant as Félix Latour
- Jean Dax as Le président du comité
- André Saint-Germain as Le photographe

== Bibliography ==
- Harriss, Joseph. Jean Gabin: The Actor Who Was France. McFarland, 2018.
