= The Cry of the Eagle =

1923 film

- Directed by: Mario Volpe
- Starring: Gustavo Serena; Dillo Lombardi
- Cinematography: Arturo Gallea
- Production company: Istituto Facista Di Propaganda Nazionale
- Distributed by: Istituto Facista Di Propaganda Nazionale
- Release date: November 1923
- Country: Italy
- Languages: Silent; Italian intertitles

The Cry of the Eagle (Italian: Il grido dell'aquila) is a 1923 Italian drama film directed by Mario Volpe and starring Gustavo Serena and Dillo Lombardi. It was made as a film supportive of Italy's new regime under Mussolini, and drew direct links between the risorgimento, the First World War and the rise of Fascism.

== Cast ==
- Manlio Bertoletti
- Mariano Bottino
- Alfredo Cruichi
- Adriana De Cristoforis
- Dillo Lombardi
- Giovanni Polli
- Bianca Renieri
- Gustavo Serena
- Giulio Tanfani-Moroni
- Renato Visca

== Bibliography ==
- Brunetta, Gian Piero. The History of Italian Cinema: A Guide to Italian Film from Its Origins to the Twenty-first Century. Princeton University Press, 2009.
