= Goodbye, Beautiful Days =

1933 film

- Directed by: André Beucler; Johannes Meyer
- Written by: André Beucler; Peter Francke; Walter Wassermann
- Based on: Happy Days in Aranjuez by Hans Székely and Robert A. Stemmle
- Produced by: Max Pfeiffer
- Starring: Brigitte Helm; Jean Gabin; Ginette Leclerc
- Cinematography: Friedl Behn-Grund
- Edited by: Herbert B. Fredersdorf
- Music by: Hans-Otto Borgmann; Ernst Erich Buder
- Production company: UFA
- Distributed by: L'Alliance Cinématographique Européenne
- Release date: 3 November 1933
- Running time: 96 minutes
- Countries: France; Germany
- Language: French

Goodbye, Beautiful Days (French: Adieu les beaux jours) is a 1933 French-German comedy film directed by André Beucler and Johannes Meyer and starring Brigitte Helm, Jean Gabin and Ginette Leclerc. It was shot at the Babelsberg Studios in Berlin and on location in Biarritz and San Sebastián. The film's sets were designed by art directors Erich Kettelhut and Max Mellin. It was co-produced and distributed by L'Alliance Cinématographique Européenne, the French subsidiary of the German company UFA. A separate German-language version Happy Days in Aranjuez with Helm appearing in both films.

== Synopsis ==
The beautiful Olga works in league with confidence tricksters in Paris, but falls in love with the engineer Pierre Lavernay on a visit to Spain. However her hopes of a new life with him are threatened by her former criminal associates and the police.

== Cast ==
- Brigitte Helm as Olga
- Jean Gabin as Pierre Lavernay
- Henri Bosc as Alexandre
- Ginette Leclerc as Marietta
- Julien Carette as Fred
- Lucien Dayle as Le bijoutier Derzan
- André Nicolle as Le commissaire Marlé
- Mireille Balin as Une jeune fille
- Thomy Bourdelle as Le commissaire Domprel
- Paul Fromet as Le père Gaston
- Maurice Rémy as Un carabinier
- Henri Vilbert as Le professeur Ronnay
