= Sarajevo (1940 French film) =

1940 film

- Theatrical film poster
- French: De Mayerling à Sarajevo
- Directed by: Max Ophüls
- Written by: Carl Zuckmayer; Marcelle Maurette; Curt Alexander; André-Paul Antoine; Jacques Natanson
- Produced by: Edward Halton; Eugène Tucherer
- Starring: Edwige Feuillère; John Lodge; Aimé Clariond; Jean Worms
- Cinematography: Curt Courant; Otto Heller
- Edited by: Myriam Borsoutsky; Jean Oser
- Music by: Oscar Straus
- Production company: B.U.P. Française
- Distributed by: Compagnie Cinématographique de France
- Release date: 1 May 1940
- Running time: 95 minutes
- Country: France
- Language: French

Sarajevo (French: De Mayerling à Sarajevo) is a 1940 French historical drama film directed by Max Ophüls and starring Edwige Feuillère, John Lodge and Aimé Clariond. Beginning in the aftermath of the Mayerling incident, the film portrays the love affair and marriage between Archduke Franz Ferdinand of Austria and Sophie, Duchess of Hohenberg, which leads to their eventual assassination in 1914 in events that triggered the First World War. The film was not a commercial or critical success. After the German occupation of France the film was banned, and Ophüls fled into exile for the second time.

== Plot ==
In the late 1800's, Franz Ferdinand, heir to the Austria-Hungart, falls for Sophie Chotek, a Czech countess. He is already a problem to the Crown because of his political ideas. In addition, a love affair with someone not of royal blood breaches protocol. The Crown allows the union only after the couple agrees to a morganatic marriage. Franz does not seem to care about the protocols of the time, which provokes the Emperor to neutralize him further by demoting him to inspector general of the army. In June 1914, fearing for his safety, Sophie seeks permission to accompany Franz to Sarajevo. Protocol dictates that no army troops attend Franz while she is present. An assassin strikes. Their deaths spark World War I.

== Partial cast ==
- Edwige Feuillère as Countess Sophie Chotek
- John Lodge as l'archiduc François-Ferdinand
- Aimé Clariond as Prince of Montenuovo
- Jean Worms as Emperor François-Joseph
- Gilbert Gil as Gavrilo Princip
- Jean Debucourt as Janatschek
- Raymond Aimos as François-Ferdinand's valet
- Gabrielle Dorziat as Archduchess Marie-Thérèse
- Henri Bosc as Serbian ambassador
- Gaston Dubosc as Count Chotek
- Marcel André as Archduke Frédéric
- Colette Régis as Archduchess Isabelle
- Jacqueline Marsan as young archduchess
- William Aguet as chamberlain
