= Louis Née =

French cinematographer

- Other name: Louis Nee
- Occupation: Cinematographer
- Years active: 1929 - 1957 (film)

Louis Née was a French cinematographer. He worked on Maurice Tourneur's 1938 film The Patriot.

== Selected filmography ==
- The Darling of Paris (1931)
- On the Streets (1933)
- The Orderly (1933)
- Temptation (1934)
- The Last Billionaire (1934)
- Antonia (1935)
- The Squadron's Baby (1935)
- Les yeux noirs (1935)
- The Brighton Twins (1936)
- The Citadel of Silence (1937)
- A Picnic on the Grass (1937)
- The Patriot (1938)
- Vertigo (1947)
- Miquette (1950)
- Three Days to Live (1957)

== Bibliography ==
- Waldman, Harry. Maurice Tourneur: The Life and Films. McFarland, 2001.
