= Ernest Ferny =

Swiss actor (1886–1939)

- Born: 17 December 1886; Geneva, Switzerland
- Died: 28 May 1939 (aged 52); Neuilly-Plaisance, France
- Occupation: Actor
- Years active: 1930-1939 (film)

Ernest Ferny (1886–1939) was a Swiss film actor.

== Selected filmography ==
- Tarakanova (1930)
- Moscow Nights (1934)
- Fedora (1934)
- The Lady of Lebanon (1934)
- Light Cavalry (1935)
- Taras Bulba (1936)
- The Red Dancer (1937)
- Boissière (1937)
- The Silent Battle (1937)
- Street of Shadows (1937)
- The Messenger (1937)
- Marthe Richard (1937)
- The Patriot (1938)
- Stolen Life (1939)

== Bibliography ==
- Goble, Alan. The Complete Index to Literary Sources in Film. Walter de Gruyter, 1999.
