= Jean Worms =

French actor

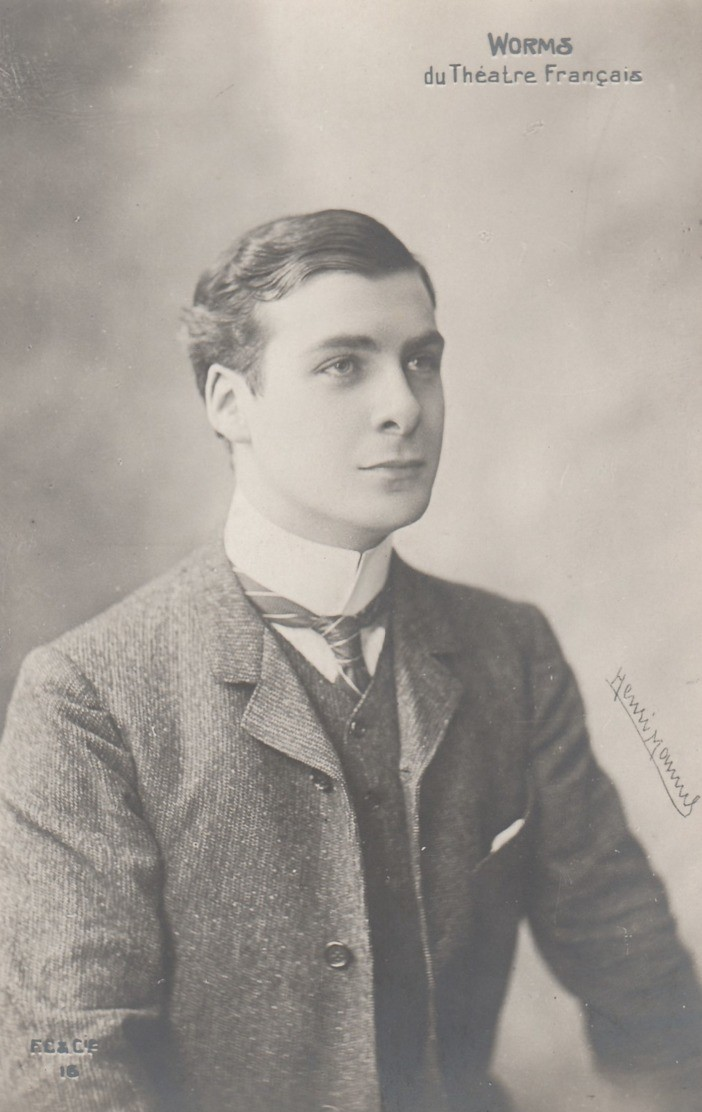
- Born: 21 February 1884; Paris, France
- Died: 17 December 1943 (aged 59); Neuilly-sur-Seine, France
- Other name: Gustave Jacques Jean Worms
- Occupation: Film actor
- Years active: 1910 - 1944

Jean Worms (1884–1943) was a French film actor who appeared in a mixture of leading and supporting roles. Worms played Tsar Nicholas II of Russia in the 1938 film Rasputin.

== Partial filmography ==
- L'auberge rouge (1910)
- 48, avenue de l'Opéra (1917) - Quincy
- Le roi de la mer (1917)
- La marâtre (1918)
- Marion Delorme (1918) - Didier
- Lorsqu'une femme veut (1918)
- Le marchand de sable (1931) - Gérard Arnaudy
- The Sandman (1932) - Le commandant Saint-Hallier
- Nights in Port Said (1932) - Le tenancier de l'agence
- Fantômas (1932) - Lord Beltham - le mari de Lady Beltham
- Narcotics (1932) - Louis Gordon
- The Orderly (1933) - Limousin
- Le voleur (1933) - Raymond Lagardes
- Le masque qui tombe (1933) - Admiral Morstan
- Volga in Flames (1934) - (uncredited)
- Gold in the Street (1934) - Le baron de Varville - un grand banquier
- Le billet de mille (1935) - L'aristocrate
- Antonia (1935) - Bela de Palmay
- La Garçonne (1936) - Lerbier
- L'argent (1936) - Daigremont
- Port Arthur (1936) - Commander Novitzki
- The Red Dancer (1937) - Maître Brégyl
- Gribouille (1937) - Le président
- Maman Colibri (1937) - Pierre de Rysbergue
- Abused Confidence (1938) - Le président du tribunal
- Rasputin (1938) - Tsar Nicholas II
- Adrienne Lecouvreur (1938) - Le duc de Chaumont
- Women's Prison (1938) - Max Régent
- La cité des lumières (1938)
- Three from St Cyr (1939) - Le commandant Lenoir
- Vidocq (1939) - Le préfet Henry
- Entente cordiale (1939) - Théophile Delcassé
- Law of the North (1939) - Un monsieur au bal de charité (uncredited)
- Brazza ou l'épopée du Congo (1940) - L'amiral de Montaignac
- Sarajevo (1940) - L'empereur François Joseph (avec)
- Une femme disparaît (1942) - Henri Chardin (final film role)

== Bibliography ==
- Kennedy-Karpat, Colleen. Rogues, Romance, and Exoticism in French Cinema of the 1930s. Fairleigh Dickinson, 2013.
