= Jeanne Brindeau =

French actress (1860–1946)

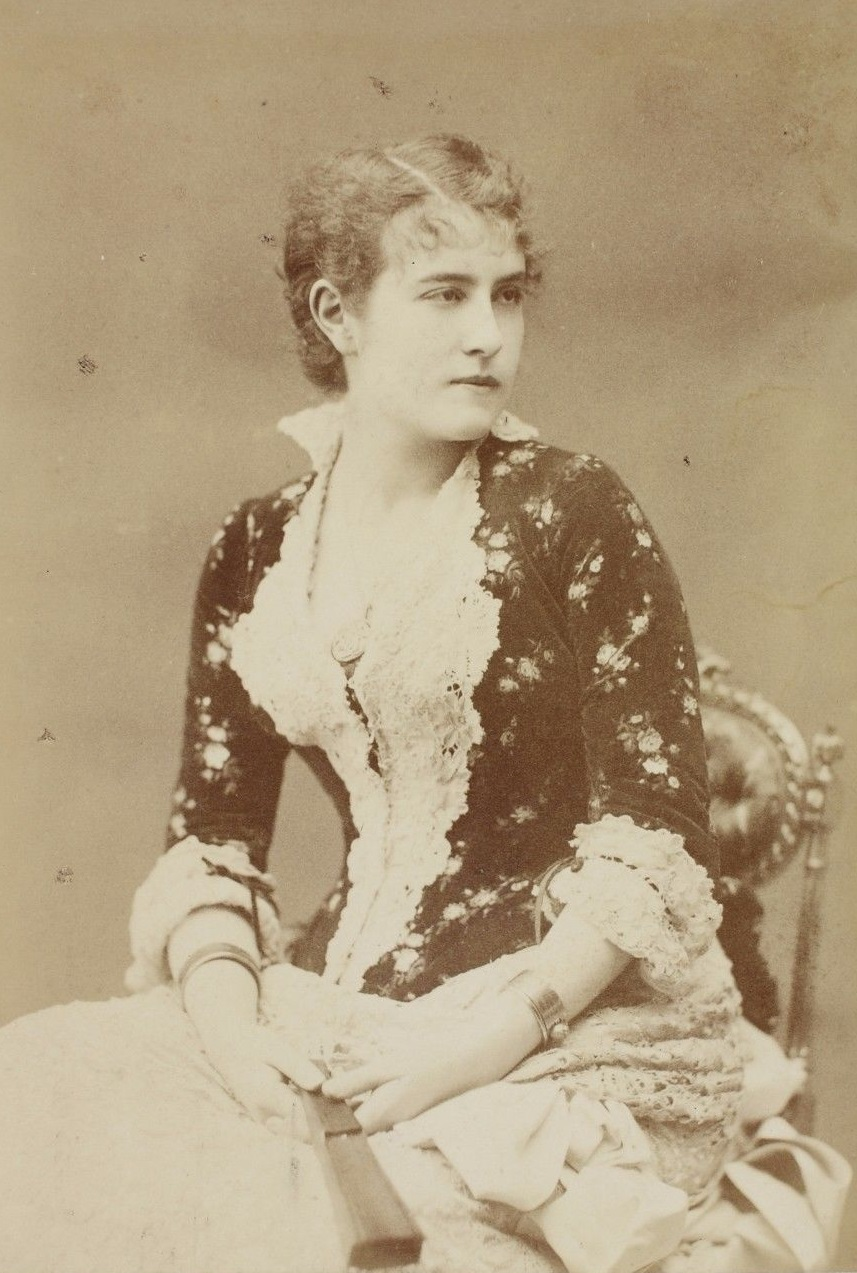
- Brindeau in around 1890
- Born: 22 October 1860; Paris, France
- Died: 6 April 1946 (age 85); Paris, France
- Other name: Jeanne-Louise Dejarny-Brindeau
- Occupation: Actress
- Years active: 1910–1936 (film)

Jeanne Brindeau (22 October 1860 – 6 April 1946) was a French stage and film actress.

== Selected filmography ==
- Ramuntcho (1919)
- Enemies of Women (1923)
- The Masked Woman (1924)
- The Clairvoyant (1924)
- The Fiery Cavalcade (1925)
- The Hearth Turned Off (1925)
- Michel Strogoff (1926)
- End of the World (1931)
- Les yeux noirs (1935)

== Bibliography ==
- Michelangelo Capua. Anatole Litvak: The Life and Films. McFarland, 2015.
