= The Sandman (1932 film) =

1932 film

- Directed by: André Hugon
- Written by: Georges André-Cuel (novel); Paul Achard; Jean Toulout
- Starring: Jean Toulout; Kaissa Robba; Jean Worms
- Cinematography: Raymond Agnel
- Production company: Pathé-Natan
- Distributed by: Pathé Consortium Cinéma
- Release date: 15 January 1932
- Running time: 88 minutes
- Country: France
- Language: French

The Sandman (French: Le marchand de sable) is a 1932 French drama film directed by André Hugon and starring Jean Toulout, Kaissa Robba and Jean Worms. It was made at the Joinville Studios of Pathé-Natan. Location shooting took place at Ghardaïa in French Algeria. The film's sets were designed by the art director Christian-Jaque. The title refers to the folkloric figure of the Sandman.

== Synopsis ==
While serving in an outpost in French Algeria, a lieutenant is ordered to investigate the misfortunes that have befallen a number of his fellow soldiers who have fallen ill or vanished. His discoveries take him to a house owned by mysterious White Russian.

== Cast ==
- Jean Toulout as Warneskine
- Kaissa Robba as Gritcha
- Jean Worms as Le commandant Saint-Hallier
- Jean Heuzé as Le lieutenant Varnière
- Alexandre Mihalesco as Haïoub
- Suzanne Christy as Sandra
- Louis Zellas as Igor
- Paul Achard as Le cuisinier
- Jacques Gautier as Prémelle
- Rodolphe Marcilly as Laurey
- Charles Lorrain as Damboine
- Tahar Hanache as Mohamed

== Bibliography ==
- Bessy, Maurice & Chirat, Raymond. Histoire du cinéma français: 1929-1934. Pygmalion, 1988.
- Crisp, Colin. Genre, Myth and Convention in the French Cinema, 1929-1939. Indiana University Press, 2002.
- Rège, Philippe. Encyclopedia of French Film Directors, Volume 1. Scarecrow Press, 2009.
