= The Lie of Nina Petrovna =

1937 film by Victor Tourjansky

- Directed by: Viktor Tourjansky
- Written by: Hans Székely; T.H. Robert; Henri Jeanson
- Starring: Isa Miranda; Fernand Gravey; Aimé Clariond; Annie Vernay
- Cinematography: Charles Bauer; Curt Courant
- Edited by: Boris de Fast
- Music by: Joe Hajos; Michel Michelet
- Production company: Solar Films
- Distributed by: Solar Films
- Release date: 7 September 1937
- Running time: 81 minutes
- Country: France
- Language: French

The Lie of Nina Petrovna (French: Le mensonge de Nina Petrovna) is a 1937 French drama film directed by Viktor Tourjansky and starring Isa Miranda, Fernand Gravey and Aimé Clariond. It is a remake of the 1929 silent film The Wonderful Lies of Nina Petrovna with the setting moved from the Russian Empire to Imperial Vienna. The film's sets were designed by the art director Guy de Gastyne.

== Synopsis ==
A beautiful Russian woman in Vienna becomes the mistress of the powerful Baron Engern. However, she meets and falls in love with a young army officer. She is prepared to give up everything for him, but knowing that the Baron will ruin his career, she is forced to leave him and return to her former lover.

== Partial cast ==
- Isa Miranda as Nina Petrovna
- Fernand Gravey as Lieutenant Franz Korff
- Aimé Clariond as Baron Engern
- Annie Vernay as Lisl
- Gabrielle Dorziat as Baroness Engern
- Paulette Dubost as Lotte
- Roland Toutain as Tony
- Raymond Galle as advocate
- Paul Ollivier as general
- Raymond Aimos as shepherd
- René Dary as Boris
- Roger Legris as Pierre
- Pierre Magnier as uncle
- Jean Rousselière as French officer

== Bibliography ==
- Gundle, Stephen. Mussolini's Dream Factory: Film Stardom in Fascist Italy. Berghahn Books, 2013.
