= Michel Strogoff (1926 film) =

1926 film by Victor Tourjansky

- Directed by: Viktor Tourjansky
- Written by: Boris de Fast; Viktor Tourjansky; Ivan Mozzhukhin
- Based on: Michael Strogoff by Jules Verne
- Produced by: Noë Bloch; Gregor Rabinovitch
- Starring: Ivan Mozzhukhin; Nathalie Kovanko; Acho Chakatouny
- Cinematography: Fédote Bourgasoff; Léonce-Henri Burel; Nikolai Toporkoff
- Music by: Werner R. Heymann
- Production company: Société Générale des Cinématographes Éclipse
- Distributed by: Ciné-Location-Eclipse
- Release date: June 30, 1926
- Running time: 2 hr. 48 min.
- Country: France
- Language: Silent (French intertitles)

Michel Strogoff is a 1926 French silent historical adventure film directed by Viktor Tourjansky and starring Ivan Mozzhukhin, Nathalie Kovanko, and Acho Chakatouny. It is an adaptation of Jules Verne's 1876 novel Michael Strogoff. In 1961 Tourjanski directed a sequel titled Le Triomphe de Michel Strogoff.

== Cast ==
- Ivan Mozzhukhin as Michael Strogoff
- Nathalie Kovanko as Nadia Fedor
- Acho Chakatouny as Ivan Ogareff
- Jeanne Brindeau as Maria Strogoff
- Marie-Louise Vois as Zaugara
- M. Debas as Enur Feifar
- Vladimir Gajdarov as Tzar Alexandre of Russia
- Micolas Kougoucheff as General Kissoff
- Henri Debain as Harry Blount
- Boris de Fast as Féofar-Khan
- Gabriel de Gravone as Alcide Jolivet
- Vladimir Kvanin as Wassili Feodoroff, Nadia's father
- Nicolas Koline

== Production ==
A number of filmmakers involved were exiles from the Russian Revolution of 1917. The film's art direction was by Eduardo Gosch, César Lacca, Alexandre Lochakoff, Vladimir Meingard, and Pierre Schild who recreated the atmosphere of the mid-nineteenth century Russian Empire.

== Bibliography ==
- Bryony Dixon. 100 Silent Films. Palgrave Macmillan, 2011.
