= Happy Days in Aranjuez =

1933 film directed by Johannes Meyer

- Directed by: Johannes Meyer
- Written by: Hans Székely (play); Robert A. Stemmle (play); Peter Francke; Walter Wassermann
- Produced by: Max Pfeiffer
- Starring: Brigitte Helm; Gustaf Gründgens; Wolfgang Liebeneiner
- Cinematography: Friedl Behn-Grund
- Edited by: Herbert B. Fredersdorf
- Music by: Hans-Otto Borgmann; Ernst Erich Buder
- Production company: UFA
- Distributed by: UFA
- Release date: 22 September 1933
- Running time: 101 minutes
- Country: Germany
- Language: German

Happy Days in Aranjuez (German: Die schönen Tage von Aranjuez) is a 1933 German comedy film directed by Johannes Meyer and starring Brigitte Helm, Gustaf Gründgens and Wolfgang Liebeneiner. The film focus on a notorious jewel thief operating in high society. The title refers to Aranjuez in Spain.

The film was made by UFA, Germany's largest production company. It was shot at the Babelsberg Studios in Berlin with sets designed by art directors Erich Kettelhut and Max Mellin. It was based on a play of the same name by Hans Székely and Robert A. Stemmle. A separate French-language version Adieu les beaux jours with Brigitte Helm and Jean Gabin was made. In 1936 the film was remade in Hollywood as Desire, a vehicle for Marlene Dietrich and Gary Cooper.

== Cast ==
- Brigitte Helm as Olga
- Gustaf Gründgens as Alexander
- Wolfgang Liebeneiner as Pierre
- Kurt Vespermann as Fred
- Jakob Tiedtke as Juwelier Dergan
- Max Gülstorff as Professor Ronnay
- Ernst Dumcke as Kommissar Léron
- Rudolf Biebrach as Der alte Gaston
- Elfriede Jera as Marietta
- Hans Deppe
- Fritz Greiner
- Harry Hardt
- Paul Henckels
- Leo Peukert

== Bibliography ==
- Kreimeier, Klaus (1999). The Ufa Story: A History of Germany's Greatest Film Company, 1918–1945. University of California Press. ISBN 978-0-520-22069-0.
