= The Wonderful Lies of Nina Petrovna =

1929 film

- Directed by: Hanns Schwarz
- Written by: Hans Székely; Fritz Rotter
- Produced by: Erich Pommer
- Starring: Brigitte Helm; Francis Lederer; Warwick Ward; Harry Hardt
- Cinematography: Carl Hoffmann; Hans Schneeberger
- Music by: Maurice Jaubert; Willy Schmidt-Gentner
- Production company: Universum Film AG
- Distributed by: Universum Film AG
- Release date: 15 April 1929
- Running time: 102 minutes
- Country: Germany
- Languages: Sound (Synchronized); German Intertitles; Sound (Synchronized); English Intertitles

The Wonderful Lies of Nina Petrovna (German: Die wunderbare Lüge der Nina Petrowna) is a 1929 German sound drama film directed by Hanns Schwarz and starring Brigitte Helm, Francis Lederer and Warwick Ward. While there is no audible dialogue in the film, the soundtrack features a synchronized musical score with sound effects along with a theme song. It was the last big-budget film without dialogue released by the leading German studio Universum Film AG before the transition to sound began with Melody of the Heart. The film premiered on 15 April 1929 at the Ufa-Palast am Zoo in Berlin. It was amongst the most popular films released in Germany that year. A sound version was prepared for English speaking audiences. While the sound version has no audible dialog, it features a synchronized musical score with sound effects along with a theme song.

The film was remade in France in 1937 as The Lie of Nina Petrovna.

== Synopsis ==
Michael Rostof, a young officer serving in the Tsar's army in pre-1914 St. Petersburg, strikes up a deep emotional bond with Nina Petrovna. Only later does he discover she is the kept mistress of the influential Colonel Beranoff. She chooses to give up the luxurious existence that Beranoff offers her, in order to live with the much poorer Rostof. Although they can not even pay their electricity bills on time they are both happy.

Beranoff is enraged by his lover's decision to spurn him and he plots his revenge. One night in the officer's mess he traps Rostof into cheating at cards. When Rostof is confronted, he resolves to take the honourable way out. When Petrovna is informed, in order to save her lover's career and life, she agrees to abandon Rostof and go back to Beranoff. The Colonel in turn agrees to destroy the incriminating evidence. To hide the real reason from him, Petrovna pretends to abandon Rostof because he cannot afford to supply her with expensive clothes and jewels, sneering at his well meaning gift of some shoes. Rostof is left heartbroken, while Petrovna is secretly anguished.

At the end of the film, as his regiment rides out of St. Petersburg, Rostof symbolically ignores a rose thrown to him from her balcony by Petrovna. Shortly afterwards when Beranoff arrives to call on Petrovna in expectation of resuming their relationship, he discovers she has killed herself – wearing the shoes Rostof brought her.

== Cast ==
- Brigitte Helm as Nina Petrovna
- Francis Lederer as Lt. Michael Rostof
- Warwick Ward as Col. Beranoff
- Lya Jan as peasant girl
- Harry Hardt
- Ekkehard Arendt
- Michael von Newlinsky
- Franz Schafheitlin

== Music ==
The German sound version featured a theme song entitled "Einmal Sagt Man Sich Adieu" with music by Willy Schmidt-Gentner and lyrics by Fritz Rotter. The English sound version featured a theme song entitled “Nina” by Herbert James (words) and Cecil Rayners (music).

== Bibliography ==
- Bergfelder, Tim & Bock, Hans-Michael. The Concise Cinegraph: Encyclopedia of German. Berghahn Books, 2009.
- Hardt, Ursula. From Caligari to California: Erich Pommer's Life in the International Film Wars. Berghahn Books, 1996.
- Prawer, S.S. Between Two Worlds: The Jewish Presence In German And Austrian Film, 1910-1933. Berghahn Books, 2005.
