= Artists (film) =

1928 film directed by Géza von Bolváry

- Directed by: Géza von Bolváry
- Written by: Franz Schulz
- Starring: Gyula Szőreghy; Anton Edthofer; John Mylong
- Cinematography: Sophus Wangøe
- Production company: Jakob Karol Film
- Distributed by: Süd-Film
- Release date: 26 January 1928
- Running time: 55 minutes
- Country: Germany
- Languages: Silent; German intertitles

Artists (German: Artisten) is a 1928 German silent film directed by Géza von Bolváry and starring Gyula Szőreghy, Anton Edthofer, and John Mylong.

== Cast ==
- Gyula Szőreghy as Derr Zirkusdirektor Brasco
- Anton Edthofer as Der Todesfahrer Henrik Elcot
- John Mylong as Sein Assistent Kelly
- Ernst Deutsch as Der Illusionist Maranoff
- Dillo Lombardi as Der alte Artist Ettore Manelli
- Mary Johnson as Seine Ziehtochter Helga Hardt
- Werner Fuetterer as Fred Milson
- Karl Harbacher as Hans, Milsons Freund
- Teddy Bill as Ralph, Milsons Freund
- Carl von Barany as Willy, Milsons Freund

== Bibliography ==
- Bock, Hans-Michael; Bergfelder, Tim, eds. (2009). The Concise Cinegraph: Encyclopaedia of German Cinema. New York: Berghahn Books. ISBN 978-1-57181-655-9.
