= Paul Achard =

French writer

- Born: 22 March 1897; Algiers, French Algeria
- Died: 10 November 1962 (aged 65); Paris, France
- Occupation: Screenwriter
- Years active: 1932-1948 (film)

Paul Achard (1897–1962) was a French Algerian screenwriter, playwright and novelist. He adapted his own novel for the 1938 film Heroes of the Marne. He also contributed to the 1948 operetta Imperial Violets.

== Selected filmography ==
- Southern Cross (1932)
- The Sandman (1932)
- Romarin (1937)
- Heroes of the Marne (1938)
- Malaria (1943)
- Ceux du rivage (1943)
- White Wings (1943)
- The Grand Hotel Affair (1946)
- Memories Are Not for Sale (1948)
- The Renegade (1948)

== Bibliography ==
- Edwards, Paul M. World War I on Film: English Language Releases through 2014. McFarland, 2016.
- Letellier, Robert Ignatius. Operetta: A Sourcebook, Volume I. Cambridge Scholars Publishing, 2015.
