= Henri Bosc =

French actor (1884–1967)

- Born: 18 August 1884; Perpignan, Pyrénées-Orientales, France
- Died: 25 April 1967 (aged 82); Neuilly-sur-Seine, Hauts-de-Seine, France
- Occupation: Actor
- Years active: 1910-1956 (film)

Henri Bosc (1884–1967) was a French stage and film actor. He began his screen career in the silent era and was initially a leading man. He was the father of the actress Denise Bosc.

== Selected filmography ==
- Madame Pompadour (1927)
- House in the Sun (1929)
- The Sweetness of Loving (1930)
- Le cap perdu (1931)
- A Happy Man (1932)
- Goodbye, Beautiful Days (1933)
- Roger la Honte (1933)
- Fedora (1934)
- The Decoy (1935)
- The Devil in the Bottle (1935)
- Maria of the Night (1936)
- The Drunkard (1937)
- The Red Dancer (1937)
- Francis the First (1937)
- Street Without Joy (1938)
- Vidocq (1939)
- The Spirit of Sidi-Brahim (1939)
- Sarajevo (1940)
- Threats (1940)
- The Count of Monte Cristo (1943)
- The Passenger (1949)

== Bibliography ==
- Dumont, Hervé. Frank Borzage: The Life and Films of a Hollywood Romantic. McFarland, 2015.
- Goble, Alan. The Complete Index to Literary Sources in Film. Walter de Gruyter, 1999.
- Schwientek, Sabine. Conrad Veidt, Demon of the Silver Screen: His Life and Works in Context. McFarland, 2023.
