= Dillo Lombardi =

Italian film actor

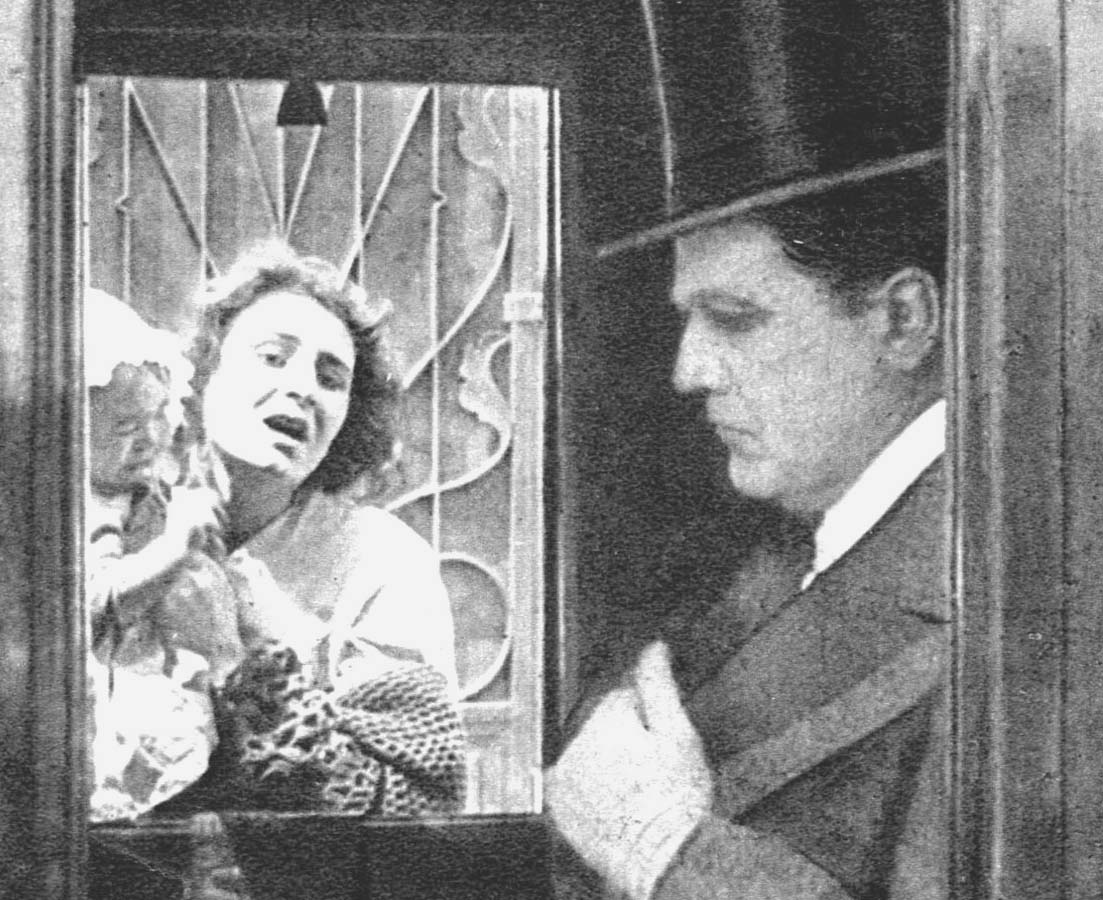
- Born: 10 January 1858; Parma, Emilia-Romagna; Italy
- Died: 15 July 1935 (aged 77); Civita Castellana, Lazio; Italy
- Occupation: Actor
- Years active: 1911–1928 (film)

Dillo Lombardi (10 January 1858 – 15 July 1935) was an Italian film actor of the silent era. He played a leading role in the 1914 film Lost in the Dark, seen as a precursor to Italian neorealism.

== Selected filmography ==
- Lost in the Dark (1914)
- The Cry of the Eagle (1923)
- Orphan of Lowood (1926)
- Volga Volga (1928)
- The Secret Courier (1928)
- Artists (1928)

== Bibliography ==
- Goble, Alan. The Complete Index to Literary Sources in Film. Walter de Gruyter, 1999.
