= The Silent Battle (1937 film) =

1937 film

- Directed by: Pierre Billon
- Written by: Jean Bommart (novel); Pierre Billon; Jacques Natanson
- Produced by: Robert Aisner
- Starring: Käthe von Nagy; Pierre Fresnay; Michel Simon
- Cinematography: Louis Page
- Edited by: Léonide Azar
- Music by: Louis Beydts
- Production company: Héraut Film
- Distributed by: Pathé Consortium Cinéma
- Release date: 9 September 1937
- Running time: 113 minutes
- Country: France
- Language: French

The Silent Battle (French: La bataille silencieuse) is a 1937 French thriller film directed by Pierre Billon and starring Käthe von Nagy, Pierre Fresnay and Michel Simon. The film's sets were designed by the art director Aimé Bazin. It was remade as a British film of the same title in 1939.

== Synopsis ==
A journalist on the trail of a group of arms smugglers becomes aware of an impending attack on the Orient Express.

== Cast ==
- Käthe von Nagy as Draguicha
- Pierre Fresnay as Bordier
- Michel Simon as Sauvin
- Abel Tarride as Bartoff
- Renée Corciade as L'américaine
- Pierre Sergeol as Fernando
- Geno Ferny as Ernest
- Ernest Ferny as Méricant
- Albert Gercourt as Sanneman
- Pierre Huchet as Le sécretaire
- André Alerme as Le directeur du journal

== Bibliography ==
- Oscherwitz, Dayna & Higgins, MaryEllen. The A to Z of French Cinema. Scarecrow Press, 2009.
