= Dark Eyes (1935 film) =

1935 film directed by Viktor Tourjansky

- Directed by: Viktor Tourjansky
- Written by: Robert Thoeren; Jean-Pierre Feydeau; Jacques Natanson; Viktor Tourjansky
- Produced by: Herman Millakowsky
- Starring: Harry Baur; Simone Simon; Jean-Pierre Aumont
- Cinematography: Louis Née; Armand Thirard
- Edited by: Boris de Fast
- Music by: Michel Michelet
- Production company: Les Productions Milo Film
- Distributed by: Sélection Servaes Films
- Release date: 5 September 1935
- Running time: 80 minutes
- Country: France
- Language: French

Dark Eyes (French: Les yeux noirs) is a 1935 French drama film directed by Viktor Tourjansky and starring Harry Baur, Simone Simon and Jean-Pierre Aumont. The film's sets were designed by the art director Eugène Lourié.

== Cast ==
- Harry Baur as Ivan Ivanovitch Petroff
- Simone Simon as Tania
- Jean-Pierre Aumont as Karpoff
- Jean-Max as Roudine
- Christiane Ribes as Une demi-mondaine
- Jeanne Brindeau as La gouvernante
- Max Maxudian
- Pierre Labry as Le noceur
- André Dubosc as Le maître d'hôtel
- Guy Sloux as Le fêtard
- Nine Assia as Lucie
- Viviane Romance as La comtesse
- Georges Paulais
- Jacques Berlioz as Le directeur
- Adrienne Trenkel
- Maxime Fabert as Un convive
- Claude Lehmann as Un jeune officier
- Marguerite de Morlaye
- Émile Genevois
- Léon Arvel as Un serveur du restaurant
- Raymond Aimos as Un serveur du restaurant
- Rodolphe Marcilly
- Pierre Athon
- André Siméon

== Bibliography ==
- Dayna Oscherwitz & MaryEllen Higgins. The A to Z of French Cinema. Scarecrow Press, 2009.
