= Volga in Flames =

1934 film directed by Viktor Tourjansky

- Directed by: Viktor Tourjansky
- Written by: Jacques Natanson; Viktor Tourjansky; Boris de Fast
- Based on: The Captain's Daughter by Alexander Pushkin
- Produced by: Charles Philipp
- Starring: Albert Prejean; Valéry Inkijinoff; Danielle Darrieux
- Cinematography: Václav Vích; Fritz Arno Wagner
- Edited by: Antonín Zelenka
- Music by: Willy Schmidt-Gentner
- Production companies: AB; Films Charles Philipp; Omnia Paris
- Distributed by: Astra Paris Films
- Release date: 9 February 1934
- Running time: 86 minutes
- Countries: France; Czechoslovakia
- Language: French

Volga in Flames (French: Volga en flammes) is a 1934 historical adventure film directed by Viktor Tourjansky and starring Albert Prejean, Valéry Inkijinoff and Danielle Darrieux. It was made as a co-production between France and Czechoslovakia and is an adaptation of the 1836 novel The Captain's Daughter by Alexander Pushkin, set during the Cossack Rebellion against Catherine the Great. It was shot at the Barrandov Studios in Prague. The film's sets were designed by the art director Andrej Andrejew and Stepán Kopecký.

== Cast ==
- Albert Préjean as Orloff
- Valéry Inkijinoff as Silatschoff
- Danielle Darrieux as Macha
- Raymond Rouleau as Schalin
- Henri Marchand as Ivan
- Marcelle Worms as His wife
- Jacques Berlioz as Le colonel
- Nathalie Kovanko as Olga
- Václav Pata as Waiter
- Josef Zezulka] as Guardsman
- Vladimír Borský
- Charles Camus
- Ladislav Hemmer
- Antonín Jirsa
- Josef Kytka
- F.X. Mlejnek
- Míla Reymonová
- Viktor Socha
- Jean Worms

== Bibliography ==
- Jonathan Driskell. The French Screen Goddess: Film Stardom and the Modern Woman in 1930s France. I.B.Tauris, 2015.
