= The Patriot (1938 film) =

1938 film directed by Maurice Tourneur

- French movie poster
- Directed by: Maurice Tourneur
- Written by: Henri Jeanson; Arnold Lippschitz
- Based on: The Patriot by Alfred Neumann
- Produced by: Nicolas Farkas
- Starring: Harry Baur; Pierre Renoir; Suzy Prim; Jacques Varennes
- Cinematography: Louis Née; Armand Thirard
- Edited by: Roger Mercanton
- Music by: Jacques Ibert
- Production company: F.C.L.
- Distributed by: Films Sonores Tobis
- Release date: 10 June 1938
- Running time: 105 minutes
- Country: France
- Language: French

The Patriot (French: Le patriote) is a 1938 French historical drama film directed by Maurice Tourneur and starring Harry Baur, Pierre Renoir and Suzy Prim. The film was based on a novel by Alfred Neumann which had previously been turned into a 1928 American silent film The Patriot starring Emil Jannings. It was made by the French subsidiary of the German company Tobis Film. The sets were designed by the Russian-born art director Alexandre Lochakoff.

The film portrays the life of Tsar Paul I of Russia.

== Cast ==
- Harry Baur as Le tsar Paul 1er
- Pierre Renoir as Pahlen
- Suzy Prim as Anna Ostermann
- Jacques Varennes as Panin
- Elmire Vautier as La tsarine
- Geller
- Nicolas Rimsky as Yocov
- André Carnège as Zoubov
- Fernand Mailly as L'amiral
- Jacques Mattler as Le commandant disgrâcié
- Robert Seller as Narichkine
- André Varennes as Le ministre de la guerre
- Victor Vina
- Paula Clère as L'espionne
- Gérard Landry as Le tsarévitch
- Colette Darfeuil as Lopouchina
- Josette Day as Nadia
- Jacques Berlioz as Un diplomate
- Roméo Carlès
- Marguerite de Morlaye
- Maurice Devienne
- Ernest Ferny as Le juge

== Bibliography ==
- Waldman, Harry. Maurice Tourneur: The Life and Films. McFarland, 2001.
