= The Singing City =

1930 film directed by Carmine Gallone

- Directed by: Carmine Gallone
- Written by: Hans Székely
- Produced by: Arnold Pressburger; Bernard Vorhaus
- Starring: Jan Kiepura; Brigitte Helm; Walter Janssen
- Cinematography: Curt Courant; Arpad Viragh
- Music by: Paul Abraham; Philip Braham; Ernesto Tagliaferri
- Production companies: UFA; Allianz Tonfilm
- Distributed by: UFA
- Release date: 27 October 1930
- Running time: 98 minutes
- Country: Germany
- Language: German

The Singing City (German: Die singende Stadt) is a 1930 German musical film directed by Carmine Gallone and starring Jan Kiepura, Brigitte Helm and Walter Janssen.

The film's sets were designed by the art director Oscar Werndorff.

An English-language version of the film, City of Song, also directed by Gallone and starring Kiepura along with a British cast, was released in 1931.

== Synopsis ==
While holidaying in Naples, a wealthy young Austrian woman discovers the singing talents of her tour guide. He falls in love with her, but once she has taken him to Vienna to launch his career, he becomes disillusioned with her lifestyle and circles of friends and returns home to Italy and his original girlfriend.

== Cast ==
- Jan Kiepura as Giovanni Cavallone - Fremdenführer
- Brigitte Helm as Claire Landshoff - junge Witwe
- Walter Janssen as Professor Andreas Breuling
- Trude Berliner as Carmela - neapolitanisches Mädchen
- Georg Alexander as Rudi Feldegger
- Franz Maldacea as Tupf - Carmelas Bruder
- Käte Bill as Susanne - Claires Zofe
- Henry Bender as Herr Maier aus Berlin
- Hermann Blaß as Der Empfangschef
- Teddy Bill as Heini Ladenburg / Claires Verehrer
- Carl Goetz as Der Nachtportier
- Martin Kosleck as Bobby Bertling - Claires Verehrer
- Carol Ress as Marthe - Claires Zofe
- Charlie Roellinghoff as Poldi Falkner - Claires Verehrer
- Ernõ Szenes as Siegmund Königsberger - ein Konzertagent
- C.H. Todd as Mr. Parkins aus London
- Hans Heinrich von Twardowski as Willi von Wellheim - Claires Verehrer

== Bibliography ==
- Bock, Hans-Michael & Bergfelder, Tim. The Concise CineGraph. Encyclopedia of German Cinema. Berghahn Books, 2009.
