= Brigitte Helm =

German actress (1908–1996)

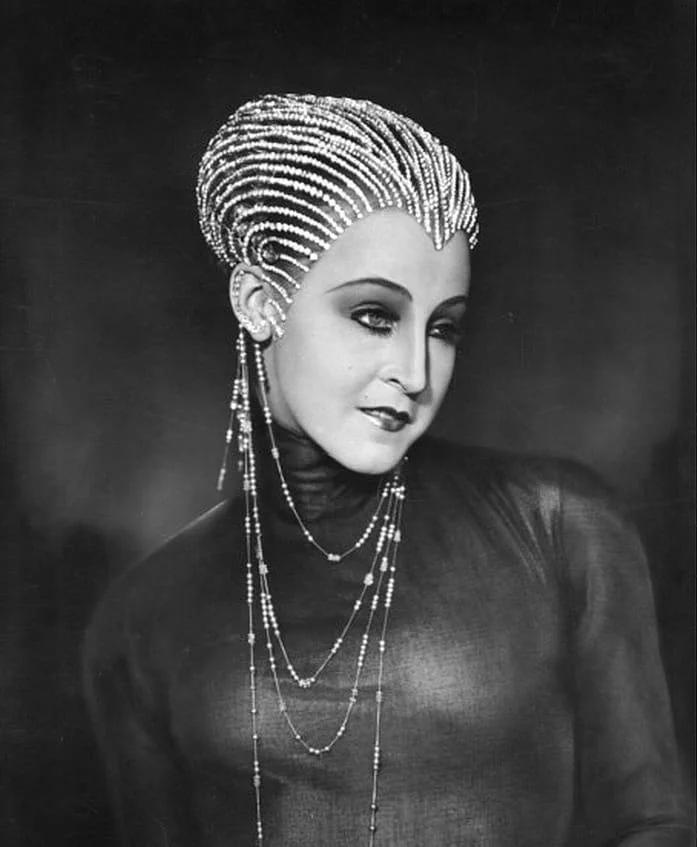
- Brigitte Helm in Metropolis (1927)
- Born: Brigitte Gisela Eva Schittenhelm; 17 March 1908; Berlin, Germany
- Died: 11 June 1996 (aged 88); Ascona, Switzerland
- Occupation: Actress
- Years active: 1927–1935
- Spouse(s): Richard Weisbach (m. 1928; div. 1934) Dr. Hugo Kunheim (m. 1935; died 1986)
- Children: 4

Brigitte Helm (born Brigitte Gisela Eva Schittenhelm, 17 March 1908 – 11 June 1996) was a German actress, best remembered for her dual role as Maria and her double, the Maschinenmensch, in Fritz Lang's 1927 silent film Metropolis.

== Early life ==
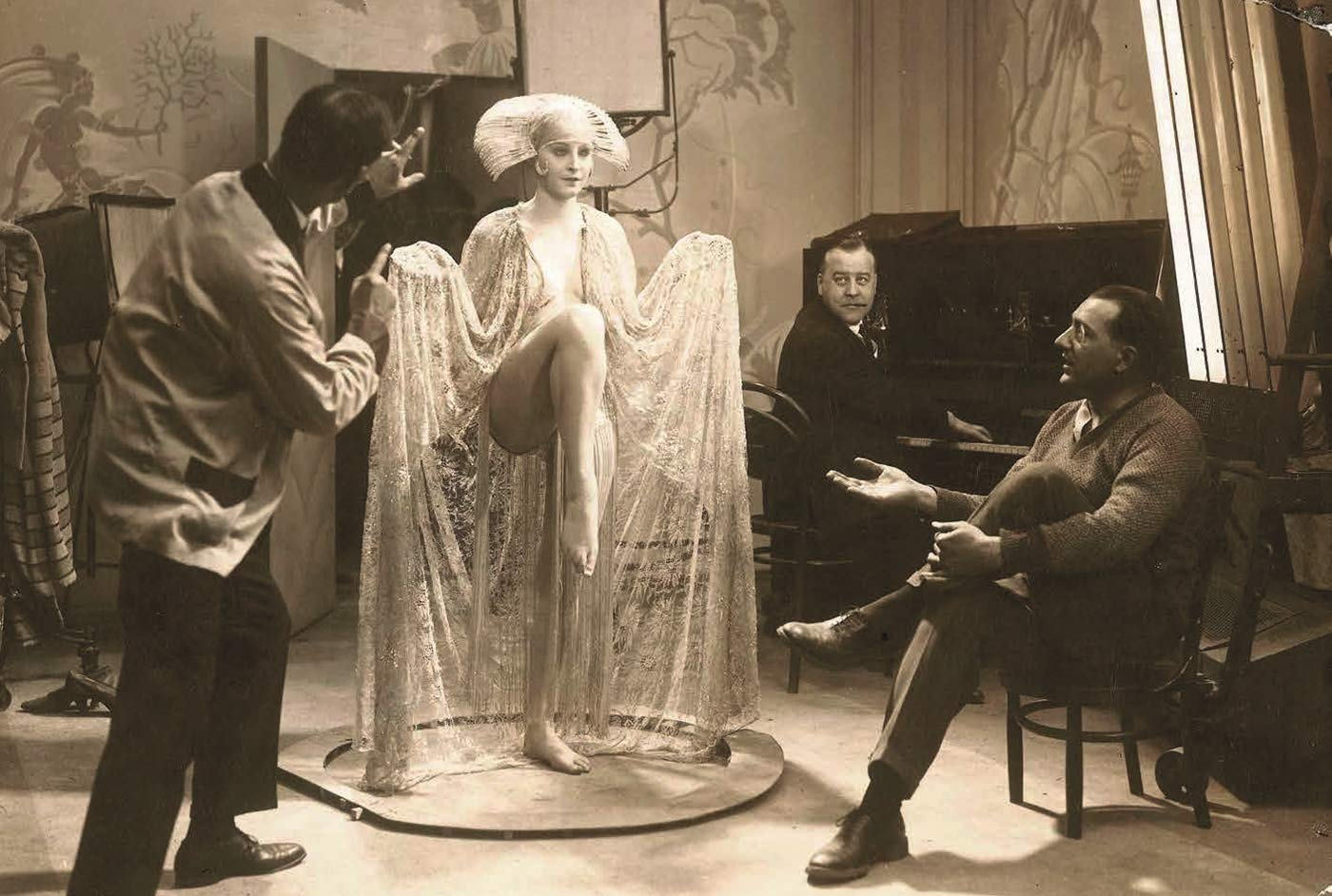
Brigitte Helm with Fritz Lang during rehearsals for Metropolis

Brigitte Gisela Eva Schittenhelm was born on 17 March 1908 in Berlin, the daughter of Gretchen Gertrud Martha Schittenhelm (née Tews; 1877–1955) and merchant Edwin Alexander Johannes Schittenhelm (1871–1913).

Helm attended school at the Johannaheim, an orphanage for girls with an attached school, founded by the entrepreneur Eduard Arnhold, located at the old customs station Werftpfuhl in Hirschfelde (now Werneuchen-Hirschfelde, Brandenburg). She took an interest in acting as a child, and by the age of twelve was taking the lead in school plays.

== Career ==
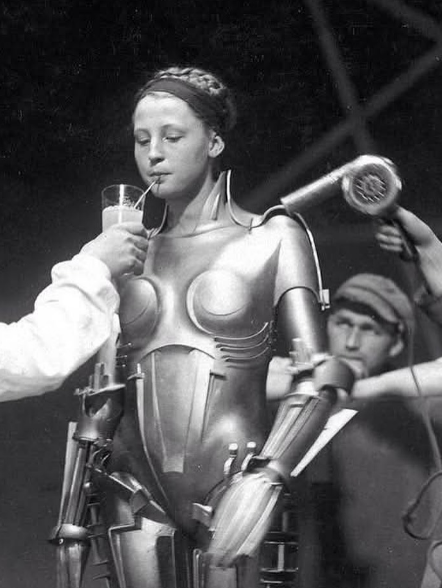
Brigitte Helm on the set of Metropolis, dressed as the Maschinenmensch

At the age of sixteen, convinced of her talent, she wrote to Fritz Lang as she wanted to become a film actress. In Neubabelsberg, she played Elizabeth in Mary Stuart for Lang. Impressed by her choice of the role of Elizabeth, her "mobile expression", and her improvisational skills, he recommended her to UFA, through which Helm received training. After an unsuccessful audition with another director, Lang decided, despite numerous reservations, to cast her in the dual role of Maria/the Maschinenmensch in his film Metropolis. She began work on Metropolis while only 17 years old. She signed a ten-year contract with UFA in 1925.

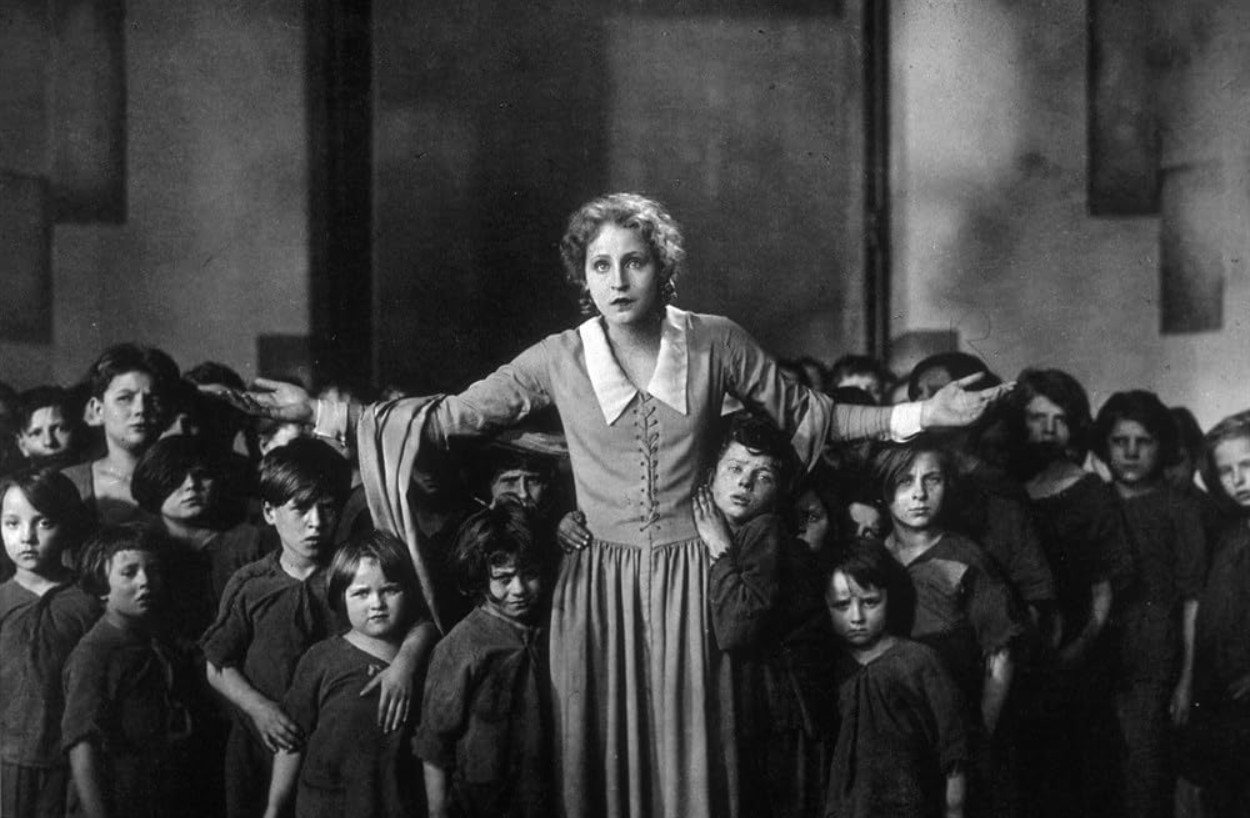
Brigitte Helm as Maria in Metropolis

After Metropolis, Helm made over 30 other films, and played almost exclusively leading roles. To avoid being typecast as a femme fatale, she sued UFA, reached a settlement, and subsequently took on other roles as well. In 1930, she filmed her first sound film, The Singing City. Since it was common practice at the time to produce sound films in different language versions, she also appeared in the French and English versions of her successful German films. Her other appearances include The Love of Jeanne Ney (1927), Alraune (1928), L'Argent (1928), Gloria (1931), The Blue Danube (1932), L'Atlantide (1932) and Gold (1934). Helm was considered for the title role in Bride of Frankenstein (1935) before Elsa Lanchester was given the role.

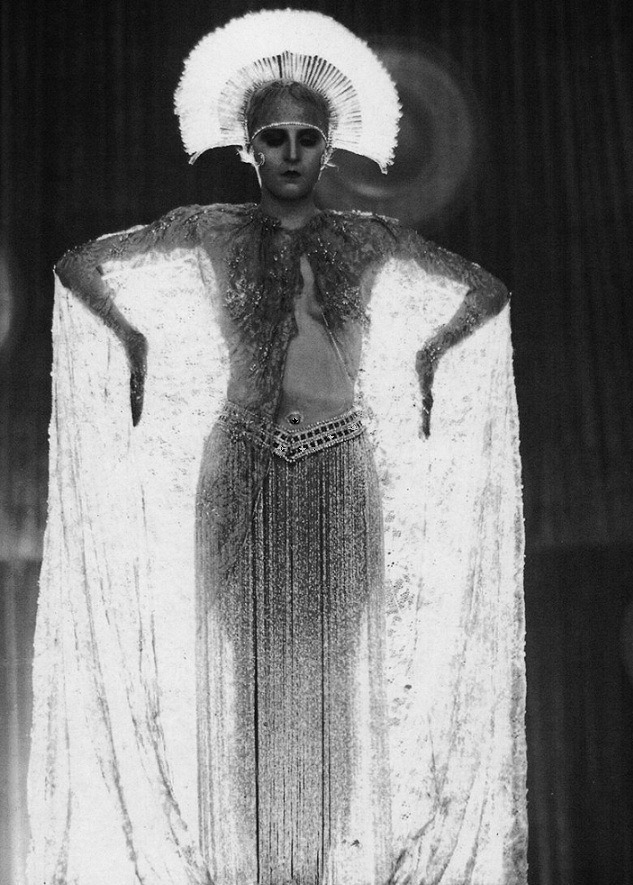
Brigitte Helm in Metropolis

In 1935, she filmed An Ideal Husband for Terra Film; this was her last film. Despite efforts by UFA, Helm withdrew from the film industry due to disagreements with the Nazi regime.

== Personal life and death ==
Helm was involved in several traffic accidents, and was briefly imprisoned. According to the Nazi Party's Press Chief Obergruppenführer Otto Dietrich's book, The Hitler I Knew, Adolf Hitler saw that manslaughter charges against her from an automobile accident were dropped.

Helm married Rudolf Weissbach in 1928, but she divorced him in 1934. She married her second husband, industrialist Dr. Hugo Eduard Kunheim, after her film contract expired in 1935. Because her second husband was of Jewish descent, in 1935 she moved with him to Switzerland, where they had four children. She never returned to the film industry.

Helm said she retired from films because she was "...disgusted with the Nazi takeover of the film industry..." In her later years, she refused to grant any interviews concerning her film career.

Helm died on 11 June 1996 in Ascona, Switzerland.

== Awards ==
In 1968, Helm was awarded the German Film Award Filmband in Gold for long-standing and outstanding contributions to German film.

== Selected filmography ==
- Metropolis (1927), director: Fritz Lang
- At the Edge of the World, (Am Rande der Welt, 1927), director: Karl Grune
- The Love of Jeanne Ney (Die Liebe der Jeanne Ney, 1927), director: G. W. Pabst
- Alraune (1928), director: Henrik Galeen; title role
- The Devious Path also known as Abwege (1928) director: G.W. Pabst
- Yacht of the Seven Sins (Die Yacht der sieben Sünden, 1928), directors: Jacob Fleck, Luise Fleck
- L'Argent (1928), director: Marcel L'Herbier
- Scandal in Baden-Baden (Skandal in Baden-Baden, 1929), director: Erich Waschneck
- Manolescu (1929), director: Victor Tourjansky
- The Wonderful Lies of Nina Petrovna (Die wunderbare Lüge der Nina Petrowna, 1929), director: Hanns Schwarz
- The Singing City (Die singende Stadt, 1930), director: Carmine Gallone
- Alraune (1930), director: Richard Oswald; title role
- Gloria (1931), director: Hans Behrendt
- Gloria (1931), director: Yvan Noé
- In the Employ of the Secret Service (Im Geheimdienst, 1931), director: Gustav Ucicky
- The Blue Danube (1932), director: Herbert Wilcox
- The Countess of Monte Cristo (Die Gräfin von Monte-Christo, 1932), director: Karl Hartl
- The Mistress of Atlantis (Die Herrin von Atlantis, 1932) director: G.W. Pabst
- Three on a Honeymoon (Hochzeitsreise zu dritt, 1932), director: Erich Schmidt
- Honeymoon Trip (Voyage de noces, 1933), directors: Germain Fried, Joe May, Erich Schmidt
- The Marathon Runner (Der Läufer von Marathon, 1933), director: Ewald André Dupont
- Spies at Work (Spione am Werk, 1933), director: Gerhard Lamprecht
- The Star of Valencia (L'Étoile de Valencia, 1933), director: Serge de Poligny
- Goodbye, Beautiful Days (1933), director: André Beucler
- Happy Days in Aranjuez (Die schönen Tage von Aranjuez, 1933), director: Johannes Meyer
- Inge and the Millions (Inge und die Millionen, 1933), director: Erich Engel
- Gold (1934), director: Karl Hartl
- The Island (Die Insel, 1934), director: Hans Steinhoff
- Count Woronzeff (Fürst Woronzeff, 1934), director: Arthur Robison
- An Ideal Husband (Ein idealer Gatte, 1935), director: Herbert Selpin
