= Boris de Fast =

French actor

- Born: July 6, 1890; Feodosia, Crimea, Russian Empire
- Died: post 1966
- Other names: Boris Fastovich; Boris De Fas
- Occupations: Actor, screenwriter, film editor and makeup artist
- Years active: 1924–1967 (film)

Boris de Fast (July 6, 1890 – 1973) was a Russian actor, screenwriter, film editor and make-up artist. Born in Feodosia, Crimea in the Russian Empire, he emigrated to France, where he worked in the film industry. His rare performances in American films include a strange villainous performance in Tempest (1928) and a role in The Woman Disputed.

== Selected filmography ==
=== Actor ===
- The Masked Woman (1924)
- Michel Strogoff (1926)
- En plongée (1926)
- Napoleon (1927)
- Princess Masha (1927)
- The Woman Disputed (1928)
- Tempest (1928)
- Madonna of the Sleeping Cars (1928)
- Volga Volga (1928)
- Land Without Women (1929)
- The Ship of Lost Souls (1929)
- The Ring of the Empress (1930)
- La Femme d'une nuit (1931)
- Queen of the Night (1931)
- The Man with a Broken Ear (1934)

=== Editor ===
- The Orderly (1933)
- Les yeux noirs (1935)
- The Lie of Nina Petrovna (1937)
- Adrienne Lecouvreur (1938)

=== Screenwriter ===
- Volga in Flames (1934)

== Bibliography ==
- Waldman, Harry. Maurice Tourneur: The Life and Films. McFarland, 2001.
