= Heroes of the Marne =

1938 film

- Directed by: André Hugon
- Written by: André Hugon; Georges Fagot; Paul Achard
- Based on: Le héros de la Marne by Paul Achard
- Produced by: André Hugon
- Starring: Raimu; Albert Bassermann; Germaine Dermoz
- Cinematography: Marc Bujard
- Edited by: Louise Mazier
- Music by: Jacques Ibert
- Production company: Films André Hugon
- Distributed by: Les Films Cristal
- Release date: 30 October 1938
- Running time: 93 minutes
- Country: France
- Language: French

Heroes of the Marne (French: Le héros de la Marne) is a 1938 French war drama film directed by André Hugon and starring Raimu, Albert Bassermann and Germaine Dermoz. The film's sets were designed by the art director Émile Duquesne.

== Synopsis ==
Bernard Lefrançois is a farmer whose land is close to the River Marne. His son Jean enlists as an aviator with the French Army. On leave he meets up with Hélène, a daughter of another local farmer, but Bernard refuses to let them marry even when Hélène becomes pregnant. She goes to Amiens to have her baby, but when World War I breaks out the city is occupied by the Germans. She courageously works undercover as a spy for the Allies while Jean becomes a fighter ace in the skies above. Bernard himself voluntarily enlists to drive out the invaders.

== Cast ==
- Raimu as Bernard Lefrançois
- Albert Bassermann as Col. von Gelow
- Germaine Dermoz as Suzanne Lefrançois
- Jacqueline Porel as Hélène Bardin
- Bernard Lancret as Jean Lefrançois
- Paul Cambo as Pierre Lefrançois
- Denis d'Inès as L'abbé Ribon
- Georges Péclet as Jules Védrines
- Fernand Fabre as L'officier prisonnier
- Jean Toulout as L'officier allemand
- Georges Paulais as Gallieni
- Camille Bert as Hans
- Fransined as Le Marseillais
- Catherine Fonteney as L'infirmière
- Édouard Delmont as Le père Bardin

== Bibliography ==
- Bessy, Maurice & Chirat, Raymond. Histoire du cinéma français: 1935-1939. Pygmalion, 1986.
- Crisp, Colin. Genre, Myth and Convention in the French Cinema, 1929-1939. Indiana University Press, 2002.
- Goble, Alan. The Complete Index to Literary Sources in Film. Walter de Gruyter, 1999.
- Rège, Philippe. Encyclopedia of French Film Directors, Volume 1. Scarecrow Press, 2009.
