= Desire (1936 film) =

1936 film by Frank Borzage

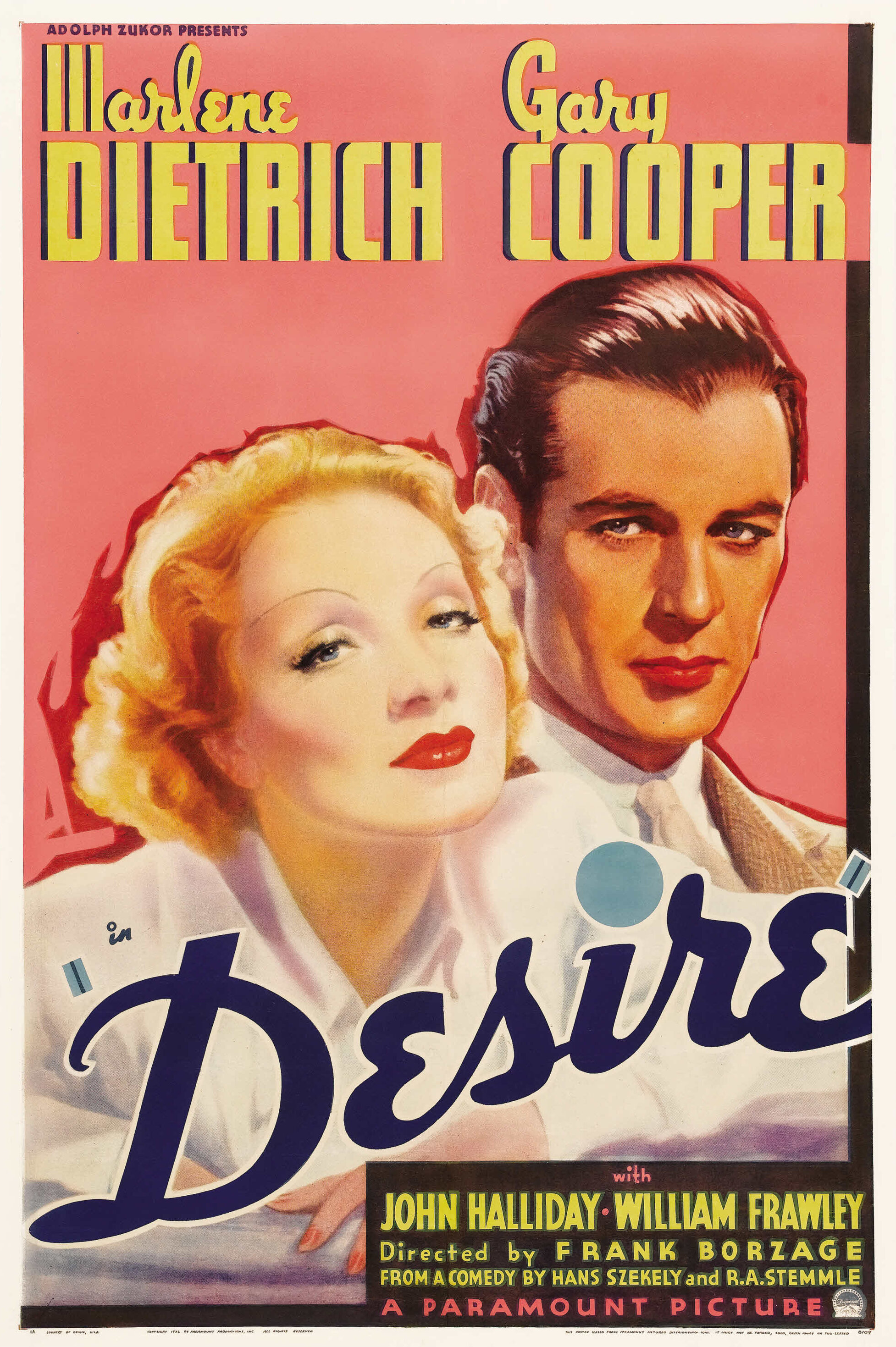
- Theatrical release poster
- Directed by: Frank Borzage
- Screenplay by: Edwin Justus Mayer; Waldemar Young; Samuel Hoffenstein
- Story by: Hans Székely; Robert A. Stemmle
- Produced by: Frank Borzage; Ernst Lubitsch
- Starring: Marlene Dietrich; Gary Cooper; John Halliday; William Frawley
- Cinematography: Charles Lang Jr.; Victor Milner (uncredited)
- Edited by: William Shea
- Music by: Frederick Hollander
- Production company: Paramount Pictures
- Distributed by: Paramount Pictures
- Release date: February 28, 1936
- Running time: 95 minutes
- Country: United States
- Languages: English; Spanish; Catalan; French; German

Desire is a 1936 American romantic crime comedy-drama film starring Marlene Dietrich and Gary Cooper, directed by Frank Borzage, and produced by Borzage and Ernst Lubitsch. The picture is a remake of the 1933 German film Happy Days in Aranjuez. John Halliday and William Frawley appear in supporting roles.

== Plot ==
Madeleine de Beaupre selects a string of perfect pearls worth millions of francs at a posh Parisian jeweler. She cons the owner Aristide Duvalle into believing she is married to an eminent and wealthy psychiatrist, Maurice Pauquet, and has him deliver the pearls to Pauquet's office in order for him to pay for them.

Before the scheduled time she meets Pauquet there and tells him her husband has delusions of needing to collect debts and needs to be examined. Stepping outside, she intercepts Duvalle and inveigles the pearls from him, slips off, and leaves each man mistakenly believing the other is her husband.

By the time the pair figure out they have been had, she is speeding towards the Spanish border. En route, she splashes mud onto Tom Bradley, an American automotive engineer on assignment in France just beginning a hard-earned European vacation before returning home to Detroit. Annoyed, he sets off in pursuit.

As the pair approaches customs, her car's horn sticks on, to the annoyance of the Spanish officers. Tom unplugs it and they go into the office together. To avoid having the hot pearls, front page news everywhere, she surreptitiously drops them into Tom's jacket pocket. His luggage cleared by the inspectors, Tom takes the coat off and packs it in his suitcase before departing. On the road, Madeleine races ahead of him, then disables her car's engine so that he will have to give her a lift. Already smitten, he is happy to do so.

She says she is going to San Sebastián, and he offers to drive her there. En route she seizes an opportunity to steal his car, leaving him standing in the road—along with his suitcase. She then crashes the car while evading police.

They make their way separately to San Sebastián. There, "Countess" de Beaupre meets her accomplice and financial sponsor, the faux Prince Carlos Margoli. Tom locates Madeleine with the help of a policeman, who cannot imagine that a charming countess would steal a car, and does not even stay to see if Tom identifies her as the thief.

Tom insists that his car be paid for, and Carlos, ostensibly Madeleine's uncle, quickly offers to do so. Madeleine pretends to be attracted to Tom so she can retrieve the pearls. He falls for her wiles, and ultimately, she does.

Carlos, who longs for Madeleine, insists she leave with him immediately for Madrid to fence them, but she has fallen in love with Tom, and wants to leave the gang and her criminal life behind. Despite the attempts of Carlos and grandmotherly gang member "Aunt" Olga to break them up, they become engaged.

After Carlos and Olga taunt Madeleine about being unable to tell Tom the truth about herself, she throws caution to the wind and does just that. Tom is too besotted by her to care about her past, only their future together, and they wrest the necklace from Carlos and beeline to Paris. Madeleine returns it to Duvalle, who personally forgives her but admonishes that she must still face the authorities for her crime.

Asked to show a marriage license before they can be wed, Tom accidentally produces Madeleine's parole, proving she has been granted clemency by the police. Duvalle, now the doctor's patient, and Pauquet serve as the couple's witnesses.

== Cast ==
- Marlene Dietrich as Madeleine de Beaupre
- Gary Cooper as Tom Bradley
- John Halliday as Carlos Margoli
- William Frawley as Mr. Gibson
- Ernest Cossart as Aristide Duvalle
- Akim Tamiroff as Avilia, Police Official
- Alan Mowbray as Dr. Maurice Pauquet
- Zeffie Tilbury as Aunt Olga

== Production ==
John Gilbert was initially cast as Carlos Margoli, which was to be his comeback role. He had a heart attack in his dressing room a few weeks later and was immediately replaced by John Halliday.

The film's screenplay was written by Samuel Hoffenstein, Edwin Justus Mayer, and Waldemar Young, based on the play Die Schönen Tage von Aranjuez by Hans Székely and Robert A. Stemmle. The picture was shot at Paramount Studios and at the Iverson Movie Ranch in Chatsworth, California, and, unusual for its time, on location in France and Spain. Some of the scenes in the film were directed by Ernst Lubitsch whilst Frank Borzage was fulfilling a prior commitment at Warner Bros. The music score was composed by Frederick Hollander, and cinematography was by Charles Lang and Victor Milner. Marlene Dietrich's wardrobe was designed by Travis Banton.

Of the film, Dietrich said:

The only film I need not be ashamed of is Desire, directed by Frank Borzage and based on a script by Ernst Lubitsch. I found Gary Cooper a little less monosyllabic than before. He was finally rid of Lupe Vélez, who had been at his heels constantly throughout the shooting of Morocco.

And:

Desire became a good film and, moreover, also proved to be a box-office success. The script was excellent, the roles superb – one more proof that these elements are more important than actors.

== Critical reviews ==
Writing for The Spectator in 1936, Graham Greene gave the film a highly positive review, describing it as "the best film in which Miss Marlene Dietrich has appeared since she left Germany, and the most amusing new film to be seen in London this week". Greene also praised Cooper's performance as one of his best.

The New York Post review was also enthusiastic: "Miss Dietrich has come through with the best picture she has made since 'The Blue Angel"....'Desire' is a picture which happily blends the best in acting with sprightly direction, stimulating dialogue and action. The plot is shamelessly conventional, but you don't care about that. The point is that the picture is alive and that Miss Dietrich and Gary Cooper keep it inspired with performances that match each other for deftness and authority....The stars are supported by a flawless cast."
