= Prince Charming (1925 film) =

1925 film directed by Viktor Tourjansky

- Directed by: Viktor Tourjansky
- Written by: Joseph Faivre; Alexandre Filipoff
- Produced by: Gregor Rabinovitch
- Starring: Jaque Catelain; Nathalie Kovanko; Nicolas Koline
- Cinematography: Jules Kruger; Nikolai Toporkoff
- Production companies: Charitonoff; Ciné France
- Distributed by: Pathé Consortium Cinéma
- Release date: 27 March 1925
- Running time: 103 minutes
- Country: France
- Languages: Silent; French intertitles

Prince Charming (French: Le Prince charmant) is a 1925 French silent adventure film directed by Viktor Tourjansky and starring Jaque Catelain, Nathalie Kovanko and Nicolas Koline. It was shot at the Billancourt Studios in Paris and on location in Villefranche-sur-Mer. The film's sets were designed by the art director Alexandre Lochakoff.

== Cast ==
- Jaque Catelain as Le comte Patrice
- Nathalie Kovanko as Anar
- Nicolas Koline as Brick
- Claude France as La princesse Christiane de Solnick
- Pierre Bory as Hebbart
- Léon Courtois as Le premier ministre
- Lapouchin as Le calife Markoum
- Grogoire Metchikoff as Ahmed
- Louis Monfils as Le premier ministre
- Paul Ollivier as Le chef du protocole
- Lili Damita

== Bibliography ==
- Abel, Richard. French Film Theory and Criticism: 1907-1929. Princeton University Press, 1993.
- Oscherwitz, Dayna & Higgins, MaryEllen. The A to Z of French Cinema. Scarecrow Press, 2009.
