= Jacques Natanson =

French writer Jacques Natanson (15 May 1901 – 19 May 1975) first became involved in the movies in 1929 when one of his plays was adapted for the screen. He enjoyed a fruitful collaboration with Max Ophüls, on such films as La Ronde (1951, earning an Academy Award nomination), Le Plaisir (1952), and Lola Montès (1955).

== Selected filmography ==
- Monsieur the Duke (1931)
- The Orderly (1933)
- To Be Loved (1933)
- Moscow Nights (1934)
- Song of Farewell (1934)
- Volga in Flames (1934)
- Les yeux noirs (1935)
- Bux the Clown (1935)
- Michel Strogoff (1936)
- The Cheat (1937)
- The Silent Battle (1937)
- Storm Over Asia (1938)
- Final Accord (1938)
- Sarajevo (1940)
- Song of the Clouds (1946)
- Vertigo (1947)
- After Love (1948)
- The White Night (1948)
- Agnes of Nothing (1950)
- The Lady of the Camellias (1953)
