= Volga Volga (1928 film) =

1928 film directed by Viktor Tourjansky

- Directed by: Viktor Tourjansky
- Written by: Viktor Tourjansky
- Produced by: Joseph N. Ermolieff; Ottmar Ostermayr; Peter Ostermayr
- Starring: Hans Adalbert Schlettow; Lillian Hall-Davis; Boris de Fast; Rudolf Klein-Rogge
- Cinematography: Akos Farkas; Franz Planer
- Production company: Peter Ostermayr-Filmproduktion
- Release date: 15 November 1928
- Country: Germany
- Languages: Silent; German intertitles

Volga Volga (German: Wolga Wolga) is a 1928 German silent drama film directed by Viktor Tourjansky and starring Hans Adalbert Schlettow, Lillian Hall-Davis, and Boris de Fast. It was one of several Russian-themed films that exiled producer Joseph N. Ermolieff made in Munich during the 1920s. Interiors were shot at the Staaken Studios in Berlin and on location in Wolin. The film's sets were designed by the art directors Andrej Andrejew, Max Heilbronner and Erich Zander. It was distributed in the United States by Kinematrade Inc. in 1933 with dubbed English narration and dialogue, written by Alexander Bakshy, added.

== Cast ==
- Hans Adalbert Schlettow as Stenka Rasin
- Lillian Hall-Davis as Princess Zaineb
- Boris de Fast as Stenka's confidant Iwaschka
- Rudolf Klein-Rogge as Cossack Hadschi-Ali
- George Seroff as stable hand Filka
- Gustl Gstettenbaur as Kolka
- Valy Arnheim
- Alexej Bondireff
- Feodor Chaliapin Jr.
- Robert Garrison
- Heinrich Gotho
- Georg John
- Rudolf Lettinger
- Dillo Lombardi
- Philipp Manning
- Max Maximilian
- Ellen Plessow
- Alexander Polonsky
- Posemkowsky
- Georg Schmieter
- Max Schreck
- Ferry Sikla
- Mammey Terja-Basa
- Aruth Wartan

== Bibliography ==
- Rollberg, Peter (2008). Historical Dictionary of Russian and Soviet Cinema. Lanham, MD: Scarecrow Press. ISBN 978-0-8108-6268-5.
