= The Red Dancer =

1937 film

- Swedish poster
- Directed by: Jean-Paul Paulin
- Written by: Jacques Constant; Charles-Henry Hirsch (novel); Jacques Constant
- Produced by: Pierre Chichério
- Starring: Véra Korène; Maurice Escande; Jean Worms
- Cinematography: Henri Alekan; Nikolai Toporkoff
- Music by: Georges Auric; Edouard Flament
- Production company: Cinatlantica Films
- Release date: 21 May 1937
- Running time: 109 minutes
- Country: France
- Language: French

The Red Dancer (French: La danseuse rouge) is a 1937 French drama film directed by Jean-Paul Paulin and starring Véra Korène, Maurice Escande and Jean Worms. The film's sets were designed by the art director Alexandre Lochakoff.

== Cast ==
- Véra Korène as Tania Golgorine
- Maurice Escande as Ursac
- Ludmilla Pitoëff as Soeur Gabrielle
- Jean Worms as Maître Brégyl
- Margo Lion as Dédée, une détenue
- Jean Galland as Le docteur Karl
- Jean Toulout as Le procureur Arnoux
- Jean Martinelli as Frantz
- Paul Amiot as Le commissaire
- Henri Bosc
- René Génin
- Georges Paulais
- Jean Fay as Serge
- Pierre Finaly
- Marfa d'Hervilly
- Charlotte Barbier-Krauss
- Jeanne Marie-Laurent
- Germaine Gerlata
- Génia Vaury
- Pierre Juvenet
- André Varennes
- Ernest Ferny
- Robert Quinault
- Jacques Erwin
- Jacques Berlioz
- Jacques Roussel
- Enrico Glori
- Youcca Troubetzkov
- Robert Moor
- Victor Vina
- Maxime Fabert
- Jeanne Helbling

== Bibliography ==
- Colin Thomas Roust. Sounding French: The Film Music and Criticism of Georges Auric, 1919-1945. University of Michigan, 2007.
