= Fedora (1934 film) =

1934 film

- Directed by: Louis J. Gasnier
- Written by: Léopold Marchand
- Based on: Fédora by Victorien Sardou
- Produced by: Henri E. Ullmann
- Starring: Marie Bell; Ernest Ferny; Henri Bosc
- Music by: Marcel Lattès
- Production company: Paris France Films
- Distributed by: Les Films Paramount
- Release date: 23 March 1934
- Running time: 75 minutes
- Country: France
- Language: French

Fedora is a 1934 French drama film directed by Louis J. Gasnier and starring Marie Bell, Ernest Ferny and Henri Bosc. It is an adaptation of the 1882 play Fédora by Victorien Sardou. It was distributed by the French subsidiary of Paramount Pictures. The film's sets were designed by the art director Henri Ménessier.

== Cast ==
- Marie Bell as Fédora
- Ernest Ferny as Boris Ipanoff
- Henri Bosc as Vladimir Yarischkine
- Edith Méra as Olga Soukareff
- Héléna Manson as La femme de chambre
- Jean Toulout as Général Yarischkine
- Paul Amiot as Gretch
- François Carron as Jean de Syrien
- Louis Gauthier as Le docteur Loreck
- Jacques de Féraudy as Désiré - le valet

== Bibliography ==
- Bessy, Maurice & Chirat, Raymond. Histoire du cinéma français: 1929-1934. Pygmalion, 1988.
- Crisp, Colin. Genre, Myth and Convention in the French Cinema, 1929-1939. Indiana University Press, 2002.
- Goble, Alan. The Complete Index to Literary Sources in Film. Walter de Gruyter, 1999.
- Rège, Philippe. Encyclopedia of French Film Directors, Volume 1. Scarecrow Press, 2009.
