= Nathalie Kovanko =

Russian actress of the silent era

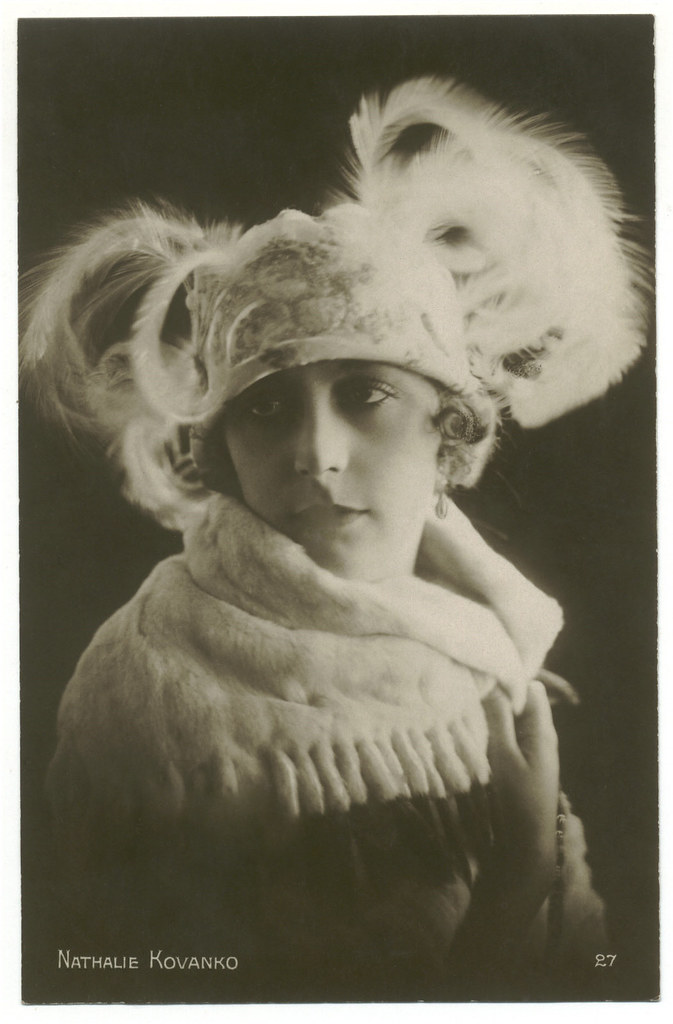
- Born: Наталья Ивановна Кованько; 13 September 1899; Yalta, Crimea, Russian Empire
- Died: 23 May 1967 (aged 67); Kyiv, Ukrainian SSR, Soviet Union
- Occupation: Actress
- Years active: 1917–1934 (film)
- Spouse: Victor Tourjansky

Nathalie Ivanovna Kovanko (Ukrainian: Наталія Іванівна Кованько, Russian: Наталья Ивановна Кованько; 13 September 1899 – 23 May 1967) was a Ukrainian film actress of the silent era who worked in France. Born Natalia Ivanovna Kovanko in Crimea, then part of the Russian Empire, now Ukraine, in 1919 she emigrated to France following the Russian Revolution. She married Victor Tourjansky, a fellow exile. She later returned to live in the USSR, where she died in 1967.

== Selected filmography ==
- The Masked Woman (1924)
- Prince Charming (1925)
- Michel Strogoff (1926)
- Volga in Flames (1934)

== Bibliography ==
- Michelangelo Capua. Anatole Litvak: The Life and Films. McFarland, 2015.
