= Gloria (1931 film) =

1931 film

- Directed by: Hans Behrendt
- Written by: Georg C. Klaren; Franz Schulz; Hans Székely
- Starring: Gustav Fröhlich; Brigitte Helm; Rolf Drucker
- Cinematography: Frederik Fuglsang
- Edited by: Friedel Buckow; Alwin Elling
- Music by: Hans J. Salter
- Production companies: Matador-Film; Pathé-Natan
- Distributed by: Bavaria Film
- Release date: 29 September 1931
- Running time: 90 minutes
- Countries: France; Germany
- Language: German

Gloria is a 1931 French-German drama film directed by Hans Behrendt and starring Gustav Fröhlich, Brigitte Helm, and Rolf Drucker. It was a co-production between the Munich-based Bavaria Film and France's Pathé-Natan. A separate French-language version Gloria was also released. Such multi-language versions were common during the early years of sound.

== Plot ==
Georg Köhler is an aircraft pilot, known for his aerobatic feats. After his marriage with Maria, and under her pressure, he severely limited his dangerous undertakings, ending up being, according to his expression, a mere "driver of the air", or rather conducting scheduled flights together with his co-pilot Jakopp Spindler. Georg and Maria have a son, little Felix, and they live right in front of the airport where he, highly esteemed by all, works. But the time for recovery seems to have come: an aerobatic flight competition is held, and Georg signs up for it. Once again, however, after unnerving confrontations and squabbles, his wife convinces him not to participate.

Johnny Belling, an old friend of Georg's, and like him a talented aviator, arrives in town to take part in the race. Now all of a sudden Maria develops an interest in the matter, even though Georg has unsuccessfully tried to share his passion for flying with her for many years. Georg's disappointment grows during the winner's banquet celebrating the victory taken by Johnny aboard his Gloria biplane. Georg seems to glimpse the attempts of seduction that his friend makes towards his wife - and he is absolutely right, if it were not for the fact that Johnny courts every woman he comes across. Displeased, Georg leaves the party and lets himself go by taking a night flight.

At the reception, Johnny continues to pour Maria a drink, and the two of them also leave the celebration during the mayor's boring speech. Johnny takes her to an amusement park and subsequent entertainment: it is definitely a pleasant diversion for the woman. In the end, Johnny, with pretexts and quibbles, manages to lure Maria, now quite drunk, into a plane, piloting which she takes off into the night. Their plane lands early in the morning, almost at the same time as Georg's. Little Felix, approaching the division network surrounding the airport, welcomes his mother and Johnny. Georg learns that Johnny spent the night on a plane with a woman, and smiles as he thinks of his friend's well-known gifting skills.

Georg and Maria (with Felix) then return home - guarded by the housekeeper - independently of each other. At breakfast, Felix innocently reveals that Mom came home in the morning with Johnny. Georg scolds her wife, reminding her how it was inconvenient to accompany a person who had such a bad reputation as a womanizer. Maria shields herself by stating that nothing bad had happened between her and Johnny, that she had enjoyed herself and that she deserved to have fun, and finally - unhappy expression - that Johnny, whatever could be said about him, had still won the race. A competition from which, Georg thinks, it was she, incongruous, who had pushed him away.

The next day Georg reads the news of Johnny's undertaking on the Gloria in the newspaper. He goes to the airport restaurant, orders take away supplies, takes them to the Gloria, which he has had some modifications made by the technicians. Jakopp Spindler noticed all this, and understood the pilot's intentions. Georg takes off, without warning anyone, and heads west, over the Atlantic Ocean. Spindler appears in the cockpit, who does not want to leave the eventual glory of the first Atlantic crossing to Georg alone, - as this is what Spindler realizes, that Georg is preparing - and is welcome. The radar systems of several countries detect the jet. The radio and the press are interested in the affair.

Radio contacts are interrupted between the Gloria and the detection systems for several hours. Meanwhile, Georg and Jakopp are facing and resolving various failures of the jet, forced to get out of the cockpit and to act on its wings, in flight, risking frostbite and life. Johnny - not so negative, then - is from Maria, and heartens her. Finally, the sensational news is spread that Georg Köhler and Jakopp Spindler have landed in New York, thus accomplishing an exceptional feat. Upon returning home, acclaimed heroes, Georg (who reconciles with Johnny) and his co-pilot manage to escape yet another boring speech from the mayor thanks to an innocent statement from Felix.

== Cast ==
- Gustav Fröhlich as Georg Köhler
- Brigitte Helm as Maria, seine Frau (his wife)
- Rolf Drucker as Felix, der Sohn (the son)
- Fritz Kampers as Jonny Belling, Kunstflieger (aerobatic pilot)
- Hugo Fischer-Köppe as Jakopp Spindler, Bordmechaniker (flight engineer)
- Hedwig Wangel as Frieda
- Paul Henckels as Oberbürgermeister (mayor)
- Olivia Fried
- Julius E. Hermann
- Alfred Beierle
- Hermann Hellweger
- Hellmut Kraus
- Fritz Schmuck
- Luigi Bernauer as Sänger (singer)

== Bibliography ==
- Rogowski, Christian (2010). The Many Faces of Weimar Cinema: Rediscovering Germany's Filmic Legacy. Camden House. ISBN 978-1-57113-429-5.
