= Victor Tourjansky =

Russian actor, screenwriter and film director

- Виктор Туржанский
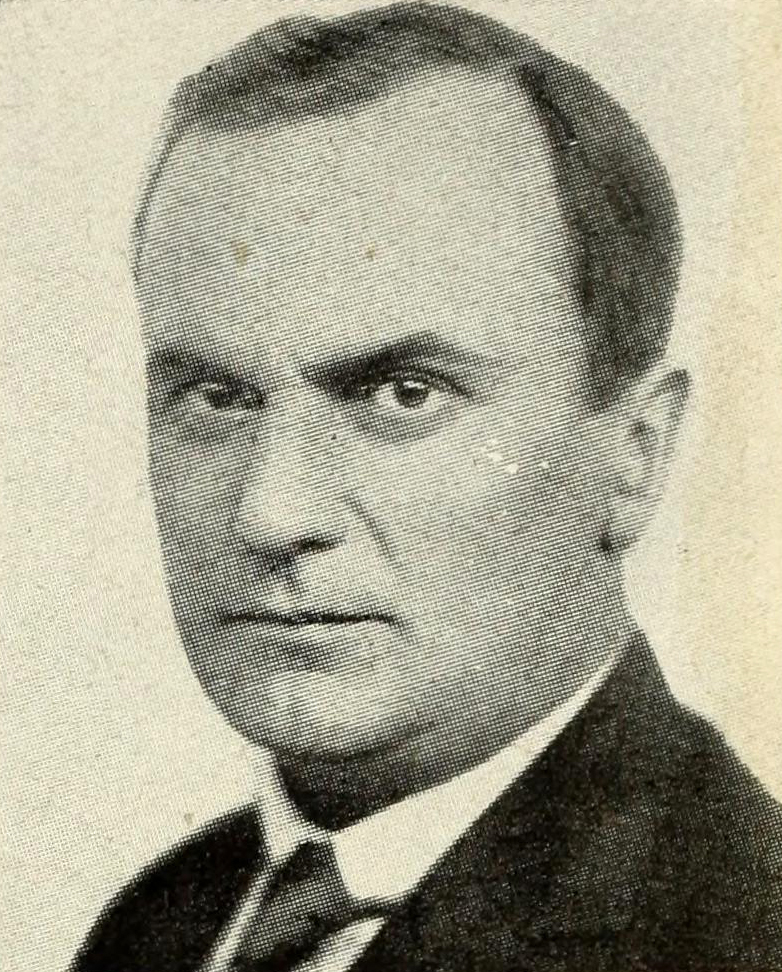
- Born: Вячеслав Константинович Туржанский; 4 March 1891; Kyiv, the Russian Empire (now Kyiv, Kyivska oblast, Ukraine)
- Died: 13 August 1976 (aged 85); Munich, West Germany (now Munich, Bavaria, Germany)
- Occupations: Film director, screenwriter, actor
- Years active: 1913–1964
- Children: Victor Tourjansky (son) (1939–2015)

Victor Tourjansky (Russian: Ви́ктор Туржа́нский, transliteration: Víktor Turzhánskiy, 4 March 1891 – 13 August 1976), born Vyacheslav Konstantinovich Turzhansky (Russian: Вячесла́в Константи́нович Туржа́нский, transliteration: Vyatchesláv Konstantínovitch Turzhánskiy), was a Russian actor, screenwriter and film director who emigrated after the Russian Revolution of 1917.

He worked in France, Germany, Italy, and the United States.

== Biography ==
Born into a family of artists in Kyiv, Tourjansky moved to Moscow in 1911, where he spent a year studying under Konstantin Stanislavski. He began working in silent film in 1912 and made his first productions as a screenwriter and director in 1914. After the October Revolution, Tourjansky went to Yalta, where he continued working with Ermolieff's company until 1919.

When the Bolshevik authorities applied the nationalization decrees to the film industry in Crimea, Tourjansky left with the Ermolieff film company and its actors, leaving for France via Constantinople in February 1920. He was accompanied by his wife, the actress Nathalie Kovanko. After arriving in Paris, he changed his birth name, Viatcheslav, to Victor, which was more easily pronounceable for the French. He was the assistant to Abel Gance for the filming of his Napoléon (1927). He later worked for Universum Film AG in Germany; he was hired by UFA in 1936 and moved to Potsdam-Babelsberg, of which several were officially honoured by the Nazis (City of Anatol, Secret Code LB 17, Faded Melody, Enemies , and Orient Express).

Tourjansky has been credited by some writers as being the director of the first ever film adaptation of Bram Stoker's novel Dracula, although it is disputed if the film, which is supposed to have been released in 1920, ever actually existed.

== Selected filmography ==
- Po trupam k schastyu (Russia, 1915)
- Zhenshchina vampir (Russia, 1915)
- Surogaty lyubvi (Russia, 1918)
- L'Ordonnance (France, 1921)
- Les Contes des mille et une nuits (France, 1921)
- Le Quinzième Prélude de Chopin (France, 1922)
- Nuit de carnaval (France, 1922)
- La Riposte (France, 1922)
- Calvaire d'amour (France, 1923)
- Le Chant de l'amour triomphant (France, 1923)
- That Scoundrel Morin (France, 1924)
- The Masked Woman (France, 1924)
- Prince Charming (France, 1925)
- Michel Strogoff (France, 1926)
- Tempest (director: Sam Taylor, US, 1928), uncredited
- The Adventurer (US, 1928)
- Volga Volga (Germany, 1928)
- Manolescu (Germany, 1929)
- The Eaglet (French-language film version, 1931)
  - The Duke of Reichstadt (German-language film version, 1931)
- The Unknown Singer (France, 1931)
- Student's Hotel (France, 1932)
- The Orderly (France, 1933)
- Volga in Flames (France, 1934)
- Dark Eyes (France, 1935)
- The World's in Love (Austria, 1935)
- La Peur (France, 1936)
- City of Anatol (German-language film version, 1936)
  - Wells in Flames (French-language film version, 1937)
- The Lie of Nina Petrovna (France, 1937)
- The Postmaster's Daughter (France, 1938)
- Faded Melody (Germany, 1938)
- Secret Code LB 17 (Germany, 1938)
- The Blue Fox (Germany, 1938)
- The Governor (Germany, 1939)
- A Woman Like You (Germany, 1939)
- Enemies (Germany, 1940, also screenplay)
- Die keusche Geliebte (Germany, 1940)
- Illusion (Germany, 1941, also screenplay)
- Liebesgeschichten (Germany, 1943)
- Tonelli (Germany, 1943, also screenplay)
- Orient Express (Germany, 1944)
- Dreimal Komödie (Germany, 1945–1949)
- The Blue Straw Hat (West Germany, 1949)
- Si te hubieses casado conmigo (Spain, 1950)
- The Man Who Wanted to Live Twice (West Germany, 1950)
- Chased by the Devil (West Germany, 1950)
- Mutter sein dagegen sehr! (West Germany, 1951)
- Marriage for One Night (West Germany, 1953)
- Salto Mortale (West Germany, 1953)
- Arlette Conquers Paris (West Germany, 1953)
- Daybreak (West Germany, 1954)
- Island of the Dead (West Germany, 1955)
- The Royal Waltz (West Germany, 1955)
- Beichtgeheimnis (West Germany, 1956)
- The Goddess of Love (co-director: Fernando Cerchio, Italy, 1957)
- Heart Without Mercy (West Germany, 1958)
- Herod the Great (co-director: Arnaldo Genoino, Italy, 1959)
- Prisoner of the Volga (co-director: Arnaldo Genoino, Italy, 1959)
- The Cossacks (co-director: Giorgio Rivalta, Italy, 1960)
- The Pharaohs' Woman (co-director: Giorgio Rivalta, Italy, 1960)
- The Triumph of Michael Strogoff (France, 1961)
- A Queen for Caesar (co-director: Piero Pierotti, Italy, 1962)
