= János Székely (writer) =

Hungarian writer and screenwriter (1901–1958)

- Born: July 7, 1901; Budapest, Hungary
- Died: December 16, 1958 (aged 57); East Berlin, East Germany
- Other names: John Pen, Hans Székely, John S. Toldy
- Occupations: Writer, screenwriter
- Awards: Academy Award for Best Story (1941)

János Székely (7 July 1901, Budapest – 16 December 1958, East Berlin) was a Jewish Hungarian writer and screenwriter. His best-known work is the 1949 autobiographical novel Kísértés (Temptation).

He published some of his books under the pen name John Pen. Further alternative names of his were Hans Székely and John S. Toldy. At the age of 18, he fled World War I, from Hungary to Germany. In Berlin, he wrote numerous screenplays for silent movie stars like Brigitte Helm, Willy Fritsch, Marlene Dietrich and Emil Jannings. Ernst Lubitsch in 1934 invited him to work in Hollywood. In 1938 he emigrated to the United States and became a sought-after screenwriter for silent and sound films. In 1940 he was awarded the Academy Award for Best Story for Arise, My Love. In the McCarthy era, he left the United States, moved to Mexico, and in 1957 to East Berlin to work with the DEFA film studio.

== Novels ==
- (1940) You can't do that to Swoboda
- (1949) Kísértés

== Screenplays ==
- Die namenlosen Helden (1923)
- The Master of Death (1926)
- Hungarian Rhapsody (Berlin, 1928)
- Magyar Rapszódia (Budapest, 1928)
- Vasárnap délután (Budapest, 1929)
- Asphalt (Berlin, 1929)
- The Wonderful Lies of Nina Petrovna (Berlin, 1929)
- Manolescu (Berlin, 1929)
- Melody of the Heart (Berlin, 1929)
- The Singing City (Berlin, 1930)
- Gloria (Berlin, 1931)
- I by Day, You by Night (Berlin, 1932)
- Early to Bed (London, 1933)
- Happy Days in Aranjuez (Berlin, 1933)
- Desire (Hollywood. 1936)
- The Lie of Nina Petrovna (Paris, 1937)
- Dramatic School (Hollywood, 1939)
- Arise, My Love (Hollywood, 1940)
- Paris Calling (Hollywood, 1942)
- Give Us This Day (London, 1949)
- Geschwader Fledermaus (East Berlin, 1958)
