= Alexandre Lochakoff =

French art director

- Other name: Ivan Lochakoff
- Occupation: Art director
- Years active: 1918–1939 (film)

Alexandre Lochakoff was a Russian-born art director. After fleeing following the Russian Revolution in 1917 he settled in France where he worked designing film sets.

== Selected filmography ==
- Heart of an Actress (1924)
- That Scoundrel Morin (1924)
- Prince Charming (1925)
- Michel Strogoff (1926)
- Muche (1927)
- Napoleon (1927)
- Secrets of the Orient (1928)
- The White Devil (1930)
- Sergeant X (1932)
- Port Arthur (1936)
- The Red Dancer (1937)
- Nights of Princes (1938)
- After Midnight (1938)
- White Nights in Saint Petersburg (1938)
- The Patriot (1938)

== Bibliography ==
- Alastair Phillips. City of Darkness, City of Light: Émigré Filmmakers in Paris, 1929-1939. Amsterdam University Press, 2004.
