= The Orderly (1933 film) =

1933 film by Victor Tourjanski

- Directed by: Victor Tourjansky
- Written by: Boris de Fast; Jacques Natanson; Viktor Tourjansky
- Based on: The Orderly by Guy de Maupassant
- Produced by: Simon Schiffrin; Grégoire Metchikian
- Starring: Marcelle Chantal; Jean Worms; Fernandel
- Cinematography: Fédote Bourgasoff; Louis Née
- Edited by: Boris de Fast
- Music by: René Sylviano
- Production companies: Capitole Films; Les Films R.P.
- Distributed by: Pathé Consortium Cinéma
- Release date: 25 August 1933
- Running time: 76 minutes
- Country: France
- Language: French

The Orderly (French: L'ordonnance) is a 1933 French drama film directed by Victor Tourjansky and starring Marcelle Chantal, Jean Worms and Fernandel. It is based on Guy de Maupassant's story L'ordonnance. Tourjanski had already filmed the same story in 1921. It was shot at the Joinville Studios of Pathé-Natan in Paris. The film's sets were designed by the art director Serge Piménoff. It was voted amongst the most popular films of the year by readers of Pour Vous magazine.

== Cast ==
- Marcelle Chantal as Hélène
- Jean Worms as Limousin
- Fernandel as Étienne
- Alexandre Rignault as Philippe
- Paulette Dubost as Marie
- Claude Lehmann as Georges
- Pierre Darmant as L'adjudant
- George Rigaud as Saint-Albert

== Bibliography ==
- Bessy, Maurice & Chirat, Raymond. Histoire du cinéma français: 1929-1934. Pygmalion, 1986.
- Crisp, Colin. Genre, Myth and Convention in the French Cinema, 1929-1939. Indiana University Press, 2002.
- Rège, Philippe. Encyclopedia of French Film Directors, Volume 1. Scarecrow Press, 2009.
