= Ramuntcho (1919 film) =

- Directed by: Jacques de Baroncelli
- Written by: Pierre Loti (novel); Jacques de Baroncelli
- Production company: Pathé Frères
- Distributed by: Pathé Frères
- Release date: 31 January 1919
- Country: France
- Languages: Silent; French intertitles

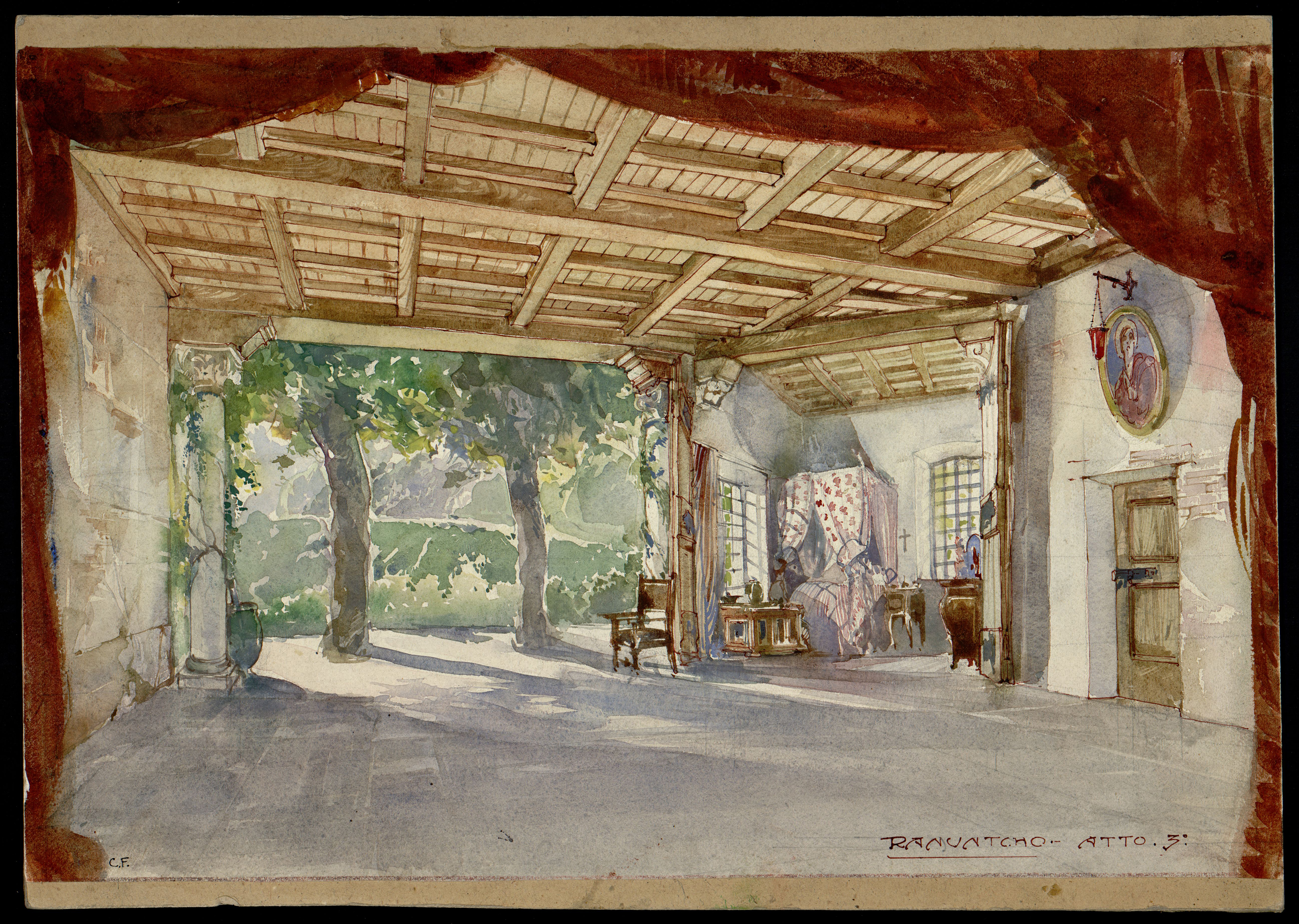
Franchita's room, set design for Ramuntcho act 3 (1921).

Ramuntcho is a 1919 French silent film directed by Jacques de Baroncelli and starring Jacques Roussel, Jeanne Brindeau and Yvonne Annie. It is based on Pierre Loti's 1897 novel of the same title.

== Synopsis ==
The young Basque smuggler Ramuntcho is engaged to Gracieuse, whose mother formally opposes their union. Ramuntcho leaves to do his military service in Indochina. On his return, decided to leave for America, he discovers that his lover has taken orders. He then plans to remove her but gives up at the last moment when he sees her immersed in her prayers.

== Cast ==
- Jacques Roussel as Ramuntcho
- Jeanne Brindeau as Dolores
- Yvonne Annie as Gracieuse
- René Lorsay

== Bibliography ==
- Dayna Oscherwitz & MaryEllen Higgins. The A to Z of French Cinema. Scarecrow Press, 2009.
