= Mario Volpe =

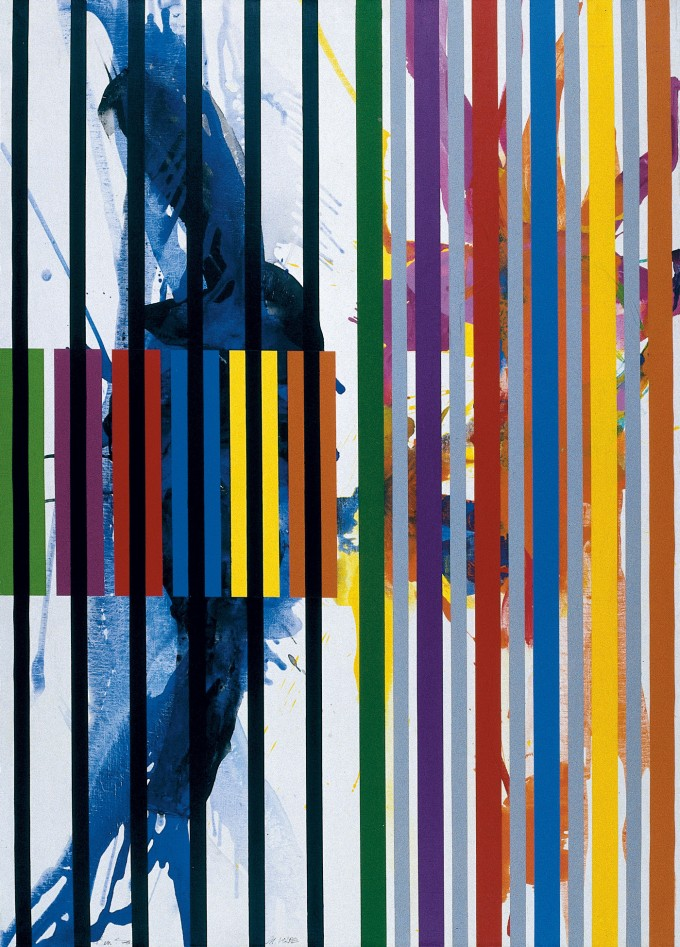
'Rideup', 1976, Bern

Mario Aldo Volpe (1936 – 2013 ) was a Colombian artist who lived in Switzerland for more than forty years. His artistic work spanned half a century and included around 3,000 abstract works on paper, board and canvas, mostly acrylic, ink, enamel and oil paintings as well as crayon, pencil and coloured pencil drawings.

Volpe's work is marked by geometric and linear elements, organic shapes, lively colours and the extensive use of black. His most significant influences can be found in the New York School of painting of the fifties and sixties, his architecture studies, and his roots in Colombia's Caribbean.

Volpe's estate is managed by the “ART-Nachlassstiftung” in Bern, Switzerland.

== Life ==
Volpe was born in Barranquilla, Colombia, on October 19, 1936, as a son of Italian immigrants. As a 12-year-old he made his first trips to New York and Italy. After completing his school years in Barranquilla, he moved to the United States at the age of 19 to study English and prepare for college at the Wilbraham Academy (now Wilbraham and Monson Academy) in Massachusetts.

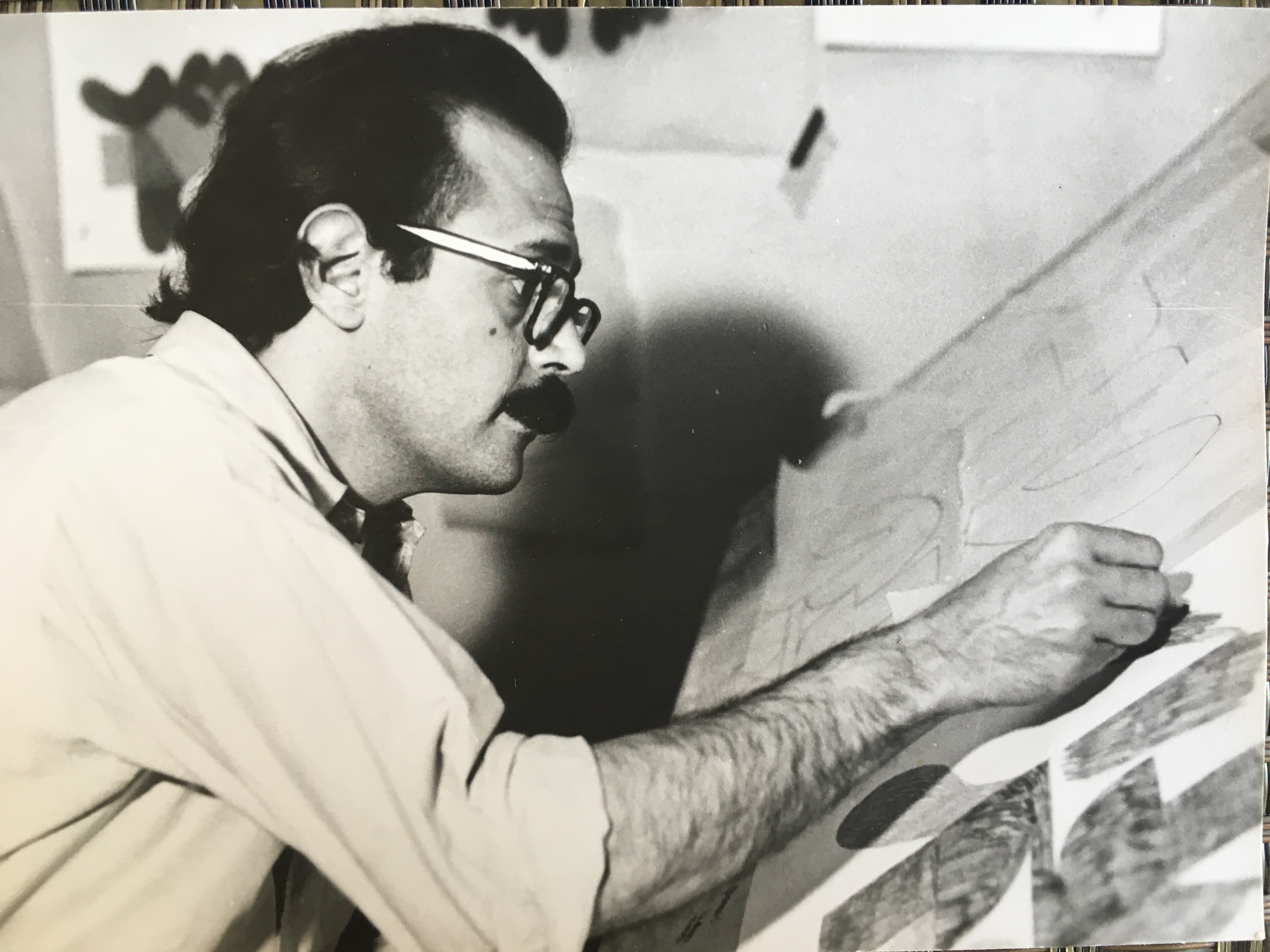
In his studio in Bern, 1972

At the age of 20, Volpe made his first direct encounter with contemporary art, at the Venice Biennale in 1956. That year, he took up his studies in architecture at the Carnegie Institute of Technology (now Carnegie Mellon School of Architecture) in Pittsburgh. After completing his architecture diploma in 1961, a scholarship from the Carnegie Institute allowed him to spend a summer at the American Academy in Fontainebleau, France, where he started to experiment with abstract drawing and became acquainted with painters and sculptors.

Volpe was accepted into the Harvard University Graduate School of Design, where he completed a year of the Masters class in architecture. In 1962, however, he decided to leave Harvard in order to fully devote himself to painting. He enrolled in the Art Students League of New York where he attended free classes for two years.

In 1964, a travel scholarship from the Art Students League took him on a study trip through Europe (London, Copenhagen, Stockholm, Helsinki, St. Petersburg, Amsterdam, Brussels, Paris, Madrid and Sevilla). After a year in Rome, where he met his wife, Brigit Scherz, Volpe moved back to the United States, to take up a position as assistant professor in the Studio Arts Department of the University of Minnesota in Minneapolis.

After five years of teaching at the University of Minnesota, Volpe moved back to Europe in 1970. He spent a year living and working in Turin, Italy, and then moved to Bern, Switzerland, in 1972, where he married Brigit Scherz in 1973. Their two children, Martina and Philippe, were born in 1974 and 1975. Volpe lived and worked in Bern until his death on 21 August 2013, at the age of 76.

== Work ==
Volpe's work has been discussed by several critics in the monograph Colour Black (2014). The art historian Alvaro Medina described Volpe's development over his career as logical and coherent. Writing in the same volume, Viana Conti characterised his use of black and white as central to his treatment of colour, while the critic Christian Campiche described the paintings as combining exuberance with restraint.

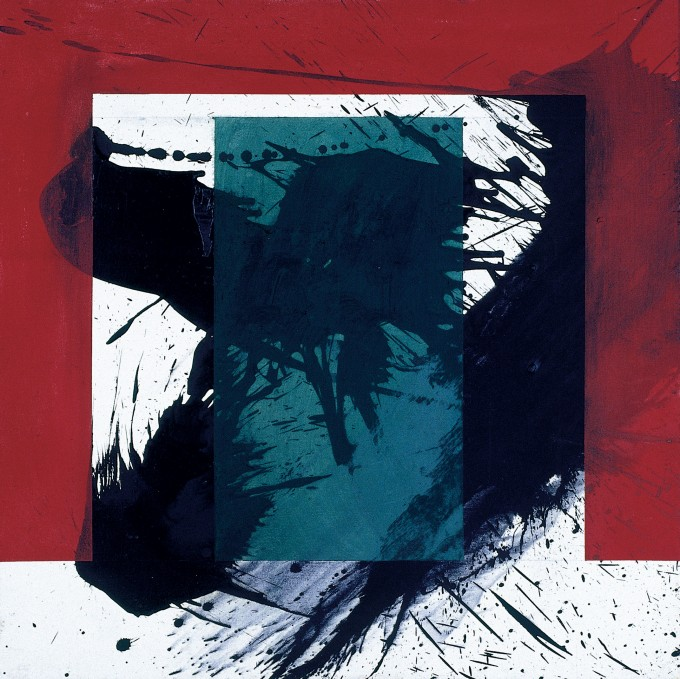
'Untitled', 1970, Minneapolis

- 1956 – 1961: Architectural drawings
- 1961: First ink paintings on paper
- 1962 – 1969: Abstract-expressionist oils on canvas, board and paper
- 1967 – 1980: “Hard-edge” paintings, with predominantly geometrical emphasis
- 1972 – 1974: Coloured pencil drawings on board
- 1979 – 1980: Vertical drawings
- 1980 – 1981: Posters and announcements
- 1981 – 1993: Acrylic paintings on canvas, board and paper
- 1993 – 1998: “T- Pictures”, combining a horizontal and a vertical format to form a “T” shape
- 1996 – 2002: “Triptychs”, works featuring three interconnected sections
- 2002 – 2008: Linear ornamental works
- 2009 – 2013: Last works

== Curriculum vitae ==
- 1936: Born in Barranquilla, Colombia
- 1943 – 1954: Colegio Biffi La Salle, Barranquilla, Colombia
- 1955: Wilbraham Academy, Wilbraham, Massachusetts, USA
- 1956 – 1961: Diploma in architecture, Carnegie Institute of Technology, Pittsburgh, Pennsylvania, USA
- 1961: Scholarship, American Academy at Fontainebleau, France
- 1962: Graduate School of Design, Harvard University, Cambridge Massachusetts, USA
- 1962 – 1964: Painting studies, class of Sidney Gross, The Art Students League of New York, USA
- 1965: McDowell Scholarship for one year of studies in Europe (Rome, Italy)
- 1965 – 1970: Teaching at the University of Minnesota, Studio Arts Department, Minneapolis, USA
- 1971: One year's stay in Turin, Italy
- 1972 – 2013: Life and work in Bern, Switzerland

== Exhibitions ==
Solo exhibitions:

- 1966: Art Students League of New York, USA
- 1968: University Gallery Minneapolis, Minnesota, USA; Minnetonka Art Center, Orono, Minnesota, USA; Morningside College, Sioux City, Iowa, USA
- 1969: Rochester Art Center, Rochester, Minnesota, USA
- 1970: Hamline University, St. Paul, Minnesota, USA; North Hennepin Jr. College, Minneapolis, Minnesota, USA
- 1974: Galerie Bettina Katzenstein, Zurich, Switzerland
- 1977: Galerie Art Shop, Basel, Switzerland
- 1979: Berner Galerie, Bern, Switzerland
- 1980: Loeb Galerie, Bern, Switzerland
- 1981: Galerie Centrale, Hermance, Switzerland
- 1982: Galerie Van Loo, Brussels; Galerie 42, Antwerpen, Belgium; Galleria Napoletana delle Arti, Naples, Italy; Musée Cantonal des Beaux-Arts, Lausanne
- 1983: Galeria Amics, Alicante, Spain; Knoll International, Napoli, Italy; Centrum Galerie, Basel, Switzerland
- 1984: Galleria Paesi Nuovi, Rome, Italy
- 1985: Hannah Feldmann Galerie, Bern, Switzerland
- 1986: Centrum Galerie, Basel, Switzerland; Salόn Cultural de Avianca, Barranquilla, Colombia
- 1987: Galerie DeI Mese-Fischer, Meisterschwanden, Switzerland; Museo de Arte Moderno, Cartagena, Colombia
- 1988: Galerie Susanne Kulli, Bern, Switzerland
- 1989: Salon Parterre, Bern, Switzerland
- 1991: Galeria Elida Lara, Barranquilla, Colombia; Galerie Susanne Kulli, Bern, Switzerland
- 1994: Galerie Susanne Kulli, Bern, Switzerland
- 1996: Galerie Susanne Kulli, Bern, Switzerland
- 1998: Galeria de la Aduana, Barranquilla, Colombia
- 1999: ATAG, Ernst and Young, Bern, Switzerland
- 2003: Universidad deI Norte, Barranquilla, Colombia; Kunstreich AG, Bern, Switzerland
- 2004: Galerie Wandelbar, Gstaad, Switzerland
- 2009: Johannes Church, Bern, Switzerland
- 2016-17: Zetcom AG, Bern, Switzerland
- 2018: Galerie Reflector, Bern, Switzerland
- 2020: Galleria Il Rivellino, Locarno, Switzerland
- 2022: Galerie Reflector, Bern, Switzerland

In addition, Volpe participated in around 60 group exhibitions, including at the Art Students League in New York, Art Expo in New York, Art Basel, Expo 2000 in Hanover, and various shows in Colombia and Switzerland.

== Bibliography ==
- Mario Volpe, with contributions by Christian Campiche, Viana Conti, Alvaro Medina: Colour Black. Till Schaap Edition, Bern, 2014
- Deborah Cullen and Elvis Fuentes: Caribbean: Art at the Crossroads of the World. Yale University Press, November 2012
- Mario Volpe, with contributions by Oswaldo Benavides C., Viana Conti: Abstractions: Obras – Works – Werke 1962 – 2002. Mueller Marketing und Druck AG, Gstaad, 2003
