= Deerhunter discography =

Discography of the band Deerhunter

- Studio albums: 8
- Extended plays: 2
- Singles: 7
- B-sides: 1
- Music videos: 9
- Split albums: 3
- Compilation appearances: 7
- Miscellaneous: 5

The discography of Atlanta, Georgia-based ambient and psychedelic band Deerhunter includes eight studio albums, two extended plays, five vinyl singles, three split albums, and nine music videos. The band has also made appearances on a number of compilation albums. Deerhunter was formed in 2001 by vocalist Bradford Cox and drummer Moses Archuleta. Members to later join were guitarists Colin Mee and Lockett Pundt, and bassists Justin Bosworth and Josh Fauver. Bosworth was killed in a skateboarding accident early in the band's career, leading to his replacement by Fauver. Mee left Deerhunter in 2007 after scheduling conflicts preventing him from performing at a number of shows.

Deerhunter released their first album, Turn It Up Faggot, named for an insult shouted at Cox during live shows, in 2005. Its successor, Cryptograms, was released in January 2007, followed by Fluorescent Grey EP several months later. Cox said in an interview with Stylus Magazine that "Cryptograms is a subdued and introverted album", characterizing Turn It Up Faggot as being "about anger and frustration" and calling the group's first record "a total failure." In 2008, Deerhunter released its third studio album, Microcastle, which included a bonus disc titled Weird Era Cont.. In 2009, the EP Rainwater Cassette Exchange was released. Microcastle was the first Deerhunter release to appear on American music charts, earning spots on the Billboard 200, Billboard's Top Independent Albums, and peaking at #1 on the Top Heatseekers chart. Rainwater Cassette Exchange also charted on Top Heatseekers, peaking at #28.

== Studio albums ==
Title	Album details	Peak chart positions									
Title	Album details	US	US Heat.	US Ind.	BEL (FL)	BEL (WA)	FRA	NLD	NOR	SWI	UK
Turn It Up Faggot	Released: June 28, 2005; Label: Stickfigure Records; Format: CD, vinyl	—	—	—	—	—	—	—	—	—	—
Cryptograms	Released: January 29, 2007; Label: Kranky; Format: CD, vinyl	—	—	—	—	—	—	—	—	—	—
Microcastle	Released: August 19, 2008; Label: Kranky, 4AD; Format: CD, vinyl	123	1	14	—	—	—	—	—	—	—
Weird Era Cont.	Released: October 27, 2008; Label: Kranky, 4AD; Format: CD, vinyl; Bonus disc included with Microcastle.	—	—	—	—	—	—	—	—	—	—
Halcyon Digest	Released: September 28, 2010; Label: 4AD; Format: CD, vinyl	37	—	7	73	93	156	99	23	—	79
Monomania	Released: May 7, 2013; Label: 4AD; Format: CD, vinyl, cassette	41	—	—	84	130	—	79	—	—	71
Fading Frontier	Released: October 16, 2015; Label: 4AD; Format: CD, vinyl	72	—	10	75	89	105	54	—	—	53
Why Hasn't Everything Already Disappeared?	Released: January 18, 2019; Label: 4AD; Format: CD, vinyl	192	—	8	62	119	127	125	—	43	89
"—" denotes releases that did not chart.

== Extended plays ==
Title	EP details	Peak chart positions
Title	EP details	US Heat
Fluorescent Grey	Released: May 8, 2007; Label: Kranky; Format: CD, vinyl	—
Rainwater Cassette Exchange	Released: June 8, 2009; Label: Kranky, 4AD; Format: CD, vinyl, cassette	28
"—" denotes releases that did not chart.

== Singles ==
Year	Title	Label	Notes	Source
2006	Deerhunter 7"	Rob's House Records	Includes material from Deerhunter's split albums with Alphabets and Hubcap City.	
2007	Whirlyball 7"	n/a	Sold only at Criminal Records in Atlanta, Georgia, and served as a ticket to see a Deerhunter concert which took place June 1, 2007. One hundred copies were pressed.	
2008	"Grayscale"	Rob's House Records	Repressing of Deerhunter/Hubcap City Split without the Hubcap City tracks.	
2008	"Nothing Ever Happened"	Kranky	b/w "Little Kids" (Demo)	
2009	"Vox Celeste 5"	Sub Pop	b/w "Microcastle Mellow 3". As part of Sub Pop's singles club.	
2010	"Revival"	4AD	b/w "Primitive 3D". Made available for download through an official email link to those who had emailed photos of the promo flyer. (See Halcyon Digest Promotion)	
2011	"Memory Boy"	4AD	b/w "Nosebleed". Released on Record Store Day.	

== Music videos ==
Year	Song	Album	Director	Source
2005	"Oceans"	Turn It Up Faggot	Shana Wood	
2007	"Lake Somerset"	Cryptograms	James Sumner	
2007	"Strange Lights"	Cryptograms	James Sumner	
2010	"Helicopter"	Halcyon Digest		
2013	"Back to the Middle"	Monomania	Olivier Groulx	
2015	"Snakeskin"	Fading Frontier	Valentina Tapia	
2015	"Breaker"	Fading Frontier	Bradford Cox & Lockett Pundt	
2015	"Living My Life"	Fading Frontier	Bradford Cox & Lockett Pundt	
2018	"Death in Midsummer"	Why Hasn't Everything Already Disappeared?	Bradford Cox & Marisa Gesualdi	

== Split albums ==
Year	Title	Label	Source
2005	Deerhunter/Alphabets Split	Die Slaughterhaus Records	
2006	Deerhunter/Hubcap City Split	Rob's House Records	
2008	"Fluorescent Grey/Oh, It's Such A Shame"	Matador Records	

== Compilation appearances ==
Year	Compilation	Song	Released by	Notes	Source
2007	Radio K	"Like New"	Radio K	Promotional compilation CD released by KUOM, the student-run radio station of the University of Minnesota.	
2007	Cue the Bugle Turbulent	"Hazel St."	The Believer	The 2007 release in a series of yearly CDs put out by The Believer.	
2007	Musicfest NW Vol. 2	"Spring Break"	MusicfestNW		
2008	Lights in the Sky: Over North America 2008 Tour Sampler EP	"Like New"	n/a	Promotional CD released prior to Deerhunter's tour with Nine Inch Nails.	
2008	Un Automne 2008	"Never Stops"	Les Inrockuptibles		
2008	New Video Works	"Strange Lights"	Post Present Medium	Collection of live performances from various bands.	
2008	Living Bridge	"After Class"	Rare Book Room Studio		

== Miscellaneous ==
Year	Album details	Notes
2005	Live Athens 2005: Released: 2005; Label: Notown Sound; Format: CD	Recordings of live material performed in Athens, Georgia.
2005	Unrequited Narcissist: Released: 2005; Label: Notown Sound; Format: CD	
2008	Fluorescent Grey Demos & Out-takes: Released: January 23, 2008; Label: n/a; Format: Digital release	Collection of early demos related to Deerhunter's 2007 EP Fluorescent Grey. Download at
2008	On Platts Eyott Island: Released: October 31, 2008; Label: n/a; Format: Cassette tape	One hundred copies were given away at an October 31 Deerhunter concert in Atlanta.
2009	Carve Your Initials Into the Walls of the Night: Released: December 12, 2009; Label: n/a; Format: Digital release	Re-release of early Deerhunter recordings from 2005, performed by Bradford Cox and Moses Archuleta. Download at
2018	Double Dream of Spring: Released: May 24, 2018; Label: 4AD; Format: Cassette	Limited to 300 copies. Available only on their 2018 summer world tour
