= Bradford Cox discography =

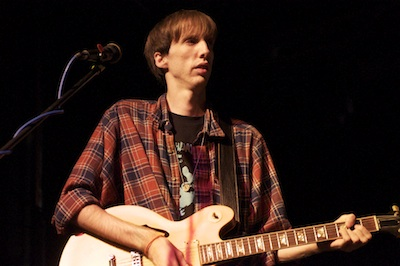
- Bradford Cox in concert
- Solo studio albums: 4
- Studio albums with Deerhunter: 8
- Solo EPs: 2
- EPs with Deerhunter: 2
- Soundtrack albums: 1

The discography of American musician Bradford Cox includes his work with Deerhunter, the band he cofounded with drummer Moses Archuleta in 2001, and his solo efforts as Atlas Sound. With Deerhunter, Cox has released eight studio albums and two extended plays, and as Atlas Sound he has released three albums, several vinyl singles and splits, and over fifty individual free tracks and demos on his blog.

Cox was born in 1982 in Athens, Georgia, and has used the name "Atlas Sound" to refer to his own music since he was a child, when he recorded on a tape player created by the company Atlas Sound. He is known for having the genetic disorder Marfan syndrome and his live performances with Deerhunter during 2007, in which he would come out on stage in dresses and covered in fake blood.

Cox released his first full-length album as Atlas Sound in February 2008, entitled Let the Blind Lead Those Who Can See but Cannot Feel. In October 2009, this was followed by Logos, which leaked onto the Internet two months before its release. Cox almost ceased production on the record in response, later saying "I did not react well to the leak, in retrospect. It became the kind of internet-fueled drama that I was quickly learning to despise". Cox's third album Parallax released in November 2011. After releasing three further albums with Deerhunter and going on hiatus, Cox released his fourth and most recent album, Thanatos in November 2026.

Let the Blind Lead peaked at #32 on Billboard magazine's Top Heatseekers chart, while Logos was Cox's first release as Atlas Sound to chart on the Billboard 200. Parallax surpassed Logos, peaking at #97 on the Billboard 200.

Deerhunter has a blog hosted by Blogspot on which Cox has been posting free music downloads, including singles, covers, extended plays, mixtapes, and full-length releases since 2007. He also takes requests for specific songs for him to record from fans. In an interview with Pitchfork, Cox said he is interested in removing possession from his music, as well as not being restrained by the release dates of typical studio albums, adding, "We have the means to produce something. Why waste our time? And why keep it from the audience, hold it over their heads until it gets to the release date, and have to have them wait until it leaks onto a blog and download a shitty encoded mp3 of it?". Several tracks from the Deerhunter blog have been sold as vinyl singles.

== With Deerhunter ==
Studio albums:

- Turn It Up Faggot (2005)
- Cryptograms (2007)
- Microcastle (2008)
- Weird Era Cont. (2008)
- Halcyon Digest (2010)
- Monomania (2013)
- Fading Frontier (2015)
- Why Hasn't Everything Already Disappeared? (2019)

Extended plays:

- Fluorescent Grey (2007)
- Rainwater Cassette Exchange (2009)

== As Bradford Cox ==
- Teenage (2013), a soundtrack for a documentary film by Matt Wolf based on Jon Savage's book Teenage: The Creation of Youth Culture.

== With The Wet Dreams ==
The short-lived trio included Bradford Cox (drums/vocals), Golden Triangle's Alix Brown (bass/vocals) and Tabitha's Julie Elledge (guitar/vocals).

Extended plays:

- 2009 Here Come the Wet Dreams

== With Cate Le Bon ==
Extended plays:

- 2019 Myths 004

== As Atlas Sound ==
=== Studio albums ===
Year	Album details	Peak chart positions		
Year	Album details	200	Heat.	Indie
2008	Let the Blind Lead Those Who Can See but Cannot Feel: Released: February 18, 2008; Label: Kranky; Format: CD, vinyl, digital download	—	32	—
2009	Logos: Released: October 19, 2009; Label: Kranky (US), 4AD (Europe); Format: CD, vinyl, digital download	182	7	21
2011	Parallax: Released: November 7, 2011; Label: 4AD; Format: CD, vinyl, digital download	97	—	—
2026	Thanatos: Released: November 20, 2026; Label: 4AD; Format: CD, vinyl, digital download	—	—	—
"—" denotes releases that did not chart.

=== Extended plays ===
European label 4AD has released a bonus disc with each Atlas Sound record.

Year	Album details	Notes
2008	Another Bedroom: Released: May 22, 2008; Label: 4AD; Format: CD	Bonus disc included with Let the Blind Lead. Released digitally by Kranky on June 2, 2008.
2009	Rough Trade: Released: October 19, 2009; Label: 4AD; Format: CD	Bonus disc included with Logos, released by Rough Trade and given away to listeners who pre-ordered Logos through their online store.

=== Singles ===
Cox has released four songs from his blog on 7-inch vinyl through Audraglint Recordings.

Year	Catalog number	Song
2008	ag118	"I'll Be Your Mirror"
2008	ag118	"Unicorn Rainbow Odyssey"
2008	ag119	"Requiem For All the Lonely Teenagers With Passed Out Moms"
2008	ag119	"Cobwebs"
2026	N/A	"Octoberland"

=== Split albums ===
Year	Split with	Label
2007	Cole Alexander	Rob's House Records
2007	Mexcellent	HOSS Records
2008	Selector Dub Narcotic	K Records

=== Other appearances ===
Year	Track	Album	Notes
2007	"Knife" (cover)	Friend	Cover of "Knife", originally by Grizzly Bear.
2008	"Headphones" (cover)	Enjoyed: A Tribute To Björk's Post	Part of a tribute album to Icelandic musician Björk.
2008	"Sleeping Village Appears Empty"	Esopus 10	The Spring 2008 edition in a series of compilation CDs released by Esopus.
2008	"It's Fair Fair Game Inside"	Yeti #5	Part of a series released by Yeti.
2009	"Different Mirrors" (drums)	The Floodlight Collective	The first solo album by Cox's bandmate Lockett Pundt.

=== Blog music ===
==== Virtual 7" releases ====
Cox has released eight "Virtual 7-inch" downloads on his blog, each containing two tracks.

2007:

- "Camcorder" b/w "Disposable Camera"

2008:

- "Virtual 7" No. 2"
- "Virtual 7" No. 3"
- "Amsterdam MIDI"
- "Holiday" b/w "S.S.C"
- "Maybe Logic"

2009:

- Solo, or The Square'"
- "Time Warp"
- "Doctor" b/w "The Screens"

==== Extended plays ====
2007:

- The Brian Foote EP
- Altitude Sickness
- Weekend

2008:

- Orange Ohms Glow
- How I Escaped the Prison of Fractals
- Things I'll Miss

2010:

- Bedroom Databank Vol. 1
- Bedroom Databank Vol. 2
- Bedroom Databank Vol. 3
- Bedroom Databank Vol. 4

=== Compilation appearances ===
- "Rough Trade: Counter Culture 2008" (2009)
- "Air Texture I bvdub + Andrew Thomas" (2011)
- "For the Birds: The Birdsong Project, Vol. III" (2022)
