= Thanatos (Atlas Sound album) =

2026 album by Atlas Sound

Studio album by Atlas Sound
- Released: November 20, 2026
- Studios: Bradford Cox's home attic, Atlanta, Georgia
- Length: 38:29
- Label: 4AD
- Producer: Bradford Cox

Atlas Sound chronology
Parallax (2011)	Thanatos (2026)

Singles from Thanatos
- 1. "Octoberland" Released: October 30, 2026

Professional ratings
Review scores
Source	Rating
Far Out Magazine	4/5
Northern Transmissions	8/10

Thanatos is the fourth studio album by Atlas Sound, the solo recording project of Bradford Cox. It was surprise-released on November 20, 2026 on 4AD, as Atlas Sound's first album in 15 years. A vinyl release is scheduled for 2027.

The album was preceded by the single "Octoberland", released on October 30, 2026, accompanied by a music video.

== Background and release ==
Following the release of Deerhunter's eighth and most recent album Why Hasn't Everything Already Disappeared? in 2019, Cox and the band quietly went on hiatus. Cox himself also remained out of the public eye, except for one-off appearances such as a noise set in an Athens, Georgia vintage market in 2023, and a series of online radio shows for NTS Radio in 2025.

On September 20, 2026, Cox, as Atlas Sound, performed his first set in seven years at the Making Time festival in Philadelphia, playing only unreleased material; he was a surprise addition to their lineup a week earlier. On October 30, he released the lead single "Octoberland" through 4AD.

Thatanos was eventually surprise-released on November 20, 2026, marking the first Atlas Sound album since 2011's Parallax. The release marked the 1,000th release on 4AD. Cox is due to perform at numerous festivals in 2027, including at Big Ears Festival alongside fellow Deerhunter member Lockett Pundt in April, followed by a solo show at Primavera Sound in Barcelona, Spain in June.

== Recording ==
All tracks were written, performed and recorded by Cox in the attic of his home in Grant Park, Atlanta. The album was recorded on a Tascam DP-008, and was mastered by producer Heba Kadry. The album cover's photograph was taken by Javier Morales, featuring a sculpture made by Chris Reynolds. Cox's late dog Faulkner is credited with emotional support.

== Themes ==
The album's biography was written by Cox's longtime collaborator Cate Le Bon, who explained:

Virginia Woolf accessed her enormous eye by leaving the house. Bradford Cox finds it by burrowing deeper inside the familiar shell that is his home. Sheltered from all exterior weather fronts. surrounded by objects he has collected and absorbed for decades and held by the warmth of the love of his life. He has consumed it all and transformed geometrical space into a living burial chamber where he can shed the self. He works only in the dead of night.

Lyrically led by a disassociated primordial wisdom usually found in the sediment of dreams. A feeling you cannot name but it scratches at the heart and soul. Elusive but knowable. It is the past sung without memory of it but evoked by an action, a gesture, a ritual, a will. A means to access and revise an incomprehensible truth that you slept without knowing a loved one once.

The album was also released with the visual aid of Cox’s "scent map", as well as an accompanying video titled "A Visit With Bradford Cox".

== Track listing ==
All tracks are written and performed by Bradford Cox.

No.	Title	Length
1.	"Octoberland"	3:36
2.	"Arcadia"	4:12
3.	"Passing Strange"	3:52
4.	"Akron"	3:21
5.	"Day For Night"	3:21
6.	"My Ship Sank in Daylight"	4:21
7.	"This Property Is Condemned"	3:39
8.	"Come and See"	4:16
9.	"Roots Without a Tree"	4:04
10.	"Kora"	3:47
Total length:		38:29
