= Revival (Deerhunter song) =

Single by Deerhunter

from the album Halcyon Digest
- A-side: "Revival"
- B-side: "Primitive 3D"
- Released: July 21, 2010
- Recorded: June 2010, at Chase Park Transduction Studios, GA
- Genre: Indie pop
- Length: 5:20
- Label: 4AD
- Songwriter: Bradford Cox
- Producer: Ben H. Allen

Deerhunter singles chronology
"Vox Celeste 5" (2009)	"Revival" (2010)	"Memory Boy" (2011)

"Revival" is the lead single from Deerhunter's fifth studio album, Halcyon Digest. The track became available for download via an official email link on July 21, 2010. A 7" pressed on white vinyl was released August 24, 2010 in a limited set of 350. The download contained the tracks along with directions to make a DIY style single, along with disc and back artwork.

== Track listing ==
1. "Revival" - 2:13
2. "Primitive 3D" - 3:07

== Personnel ==
Deerhunter

- Moses Archuleta – drums
- Bradford J. Cox – lead vocals, guitar
- Joshua Fauver – bass
- Lockett Pundt – guitar
