= Balkans (band) =

American indie rock band

- Origin: Atlanta, Georgia, United States
- Genres: Rock, indie rock, pop rock
- Years active: 2008–2012, 2017, 2019–present
- Labels: Double Phantom Records; Cave Paint Records
- Members: Brett Miller; Woodbury Shortridge; Frankie Broyles; Stanley Vergilis

Balkans is an American indie rock band from Atlanta, Georgia.

== History ==
Balkans formed in 2008 in the suburbs of Atlanta by childhood and high school friends. Frankie Broyles and Woodbury (Woody) Shortridge were childhood neighbors, and they started a band in the third grade. Woody met Stanley Vergilis in middle school, and the group of them met Brett Miller in their sophomore year in high school. Their music is said to straddle a delicious and intriguing position somewhere in-between pop and punk rock.

Between 2008 and 2010 Balkans released three 7″ singles through various local labels. Their first was a 7" split from local ATL label Die Indy Records with a band called Trial by fire., most recently, ‘Zebra Print’ and ‘Georganne’ came out on their present Atlanta based label Double Phantom Records (home to The Selmanaires, Carnivores, and Roman Photos). The singles raised attention locally from Atlanta's Creative Loafing naming one single the No.1 Atlanta Release of 2009. During this period the Band embarked on D.I.Y tours along the East Coast, frequenting warehouse type venues in Brooklyn, New York.

On February 22, 2011 the band released their fourth 7" single ‘Edita V’ which has been described as high energy punk, referencing bands such as Television with angular riffs and energetic vocals. The single was followed up by their self-titled debut LP in the US and UK on May 10, 2011. Both releases created national and international attention from taste-maker blogs such as Altered Zones, Vice and NPR. As well as publications The Fader, Atrocker, and Spin Magazine with the latter naming Balkans one of the “5 Best New Artists for June”

In support of their debut LP, In 2011, Balkans announced a string of tour dates covering the United States and Canada via the band's blog, sharing the stage with Atlas Sound, PS I Love You, Crystal Antlers, and Unknown Mortal Orchestra.

After a sold out New Year's Eve show in Atlanta, Balkans announced they were "put on hold indefinitely" via their blog. Frankie Broyles continued to tour as a solo act. Broyles went on to join Deerhunter on guitar in 2013 with the release of their LP Monomania. Woodbury Shortridge joined friend Phil Jones in the band Dog Bite which signed to Carpark Records in 2012. Dog Bite's album Velvet Changes was released the following year and supported by tours alongside Washed Out and Toro Y Moi.

In 2019 Balkans returned from hiatus to perform a sold out show at Los Angeles theater El Cid and announced plans for an accompanying New York City performance at the Market Hotel in April 2020.

== Discography ==
- C++ / F3 split w/ Trial By Fire (2008) (Die Indy Records)
- C++ / F3 7 inch (2008) (Cave Paint Records)
- Zebra Print / Oh Dear 7 inch (2009) (Double Phantom Records)
- Violent Girls Atlanta vinyl LP comp. (2009) (Creative Loafing/Criminal Records)
- Georganne / Bills Spills / Leopard Print 7 inch (2010) (Double Phantom Records)
- Edita V / Cave 7 inch (2011) (Double Phantom Records)
- Balkans (2011) (Double Phantom Records)
