= Nothing Ever Happened =

Single by Deerhunter

from the album Microcastle
- A-side: "Nothing Ever Happened"
- B-side: "Little Kids" (Demo)
- Released: October 14, 2008
- Recorded: April 2008 at Rare Book Room Studios in Brooklyn, NY
- Length: 10:01
- Label: Kranky
- Songwriters: Bradford Cox, Moses Archuleta and Josh Fauver
- Producer: Nicholas Vernhes

Deerhunter singles chronology
"Nothing Ever Happened" (2008)	"Vox Celeste 5" (2009)

"Nothing Ever Happened" is a song by Atlanta-based indie rock band Deerhunter. It is the first and only single released from Microcastle. The single was released on October 14, 2008. It came backed with a demo of another Microcastle track, "Little Kids" recorded during the summer of 2007. When playing the track live, the band will usually improvise the last section for an extended time, with the song length exceeding anywhere from eight to twenty minutes, as heard when the group played a free show at Pier 54.

Pitchfork Media named the song the 6th best song of 2008 and the 81st best song of the decade. On the track, they commented: "[Bradford] Cox's terrors are buried deep inside, and to the degree he's able to access them, they're released with a hushed, uncomplicated passion that finds the perfect fit between Poe, post-punk, and pot."

== Track listing ==
1. "Nothing Ever Happened" - 5:51
2. "Little Kids" (Demo) - 4:10
