= Overnight Motorcycle Music =

EP by Lotus Plaza
- Released: March 24, 2014
- Genre: Experimental rock, ambient
- Length: 23:45
- Label: Geographic North

Lotus Plaza chronology
Spooky Action at a Distance (2012)	Overnight Motorcycle Music (2014)

Overnight Motorcycle Music is an EP by Lotus Plaza, a solo project of American guitarist and Deerhunter member Lockett Pundt. It was released on March 24, 2014, via Atlanta-based record label Geographic North.

The EP features two tracks of instrumental guitar improvisations. It was released both on cassette and on digital download via SoundCloud. The cassette tape is limited to only 100 copies.

== Musical style and critical reception ==
Gregory Adams of Exclaim! described the track "Indian Paintbrush" as "hypnotic series of harmonized blips steadily threading themselves together throughout the 13-minute-plus experiment as if pumped through a distant AM dial. " On the other track, "Gemini Pt. 1", he also commented: "The air sign-approving collusion of cloudy guitar drones will lift your spirits into the heavens all the same."

== Track listing ==
All tracks written by Lockett Pundt.

1. "Indian Paintbrush" – 13:54
2. "Gemini Pt. 1" – 9:51
