= Cole Alexander/Bradford Cox Split =

Album by Bradford Cox

EP by Bradford Cox as Atlas Sound/Cole Alexander
- Released: 2006
- Genre: Indie rock
- Label: Rob's House Records

Opposite Side
- Cole Alexander Side

Cole Alexander/Bradford Cox Split is a 2006 EP by Bradford Cox as Atlas Sound and Cole Alexander released on Rob's House Records. Five-hundred black 10" vinyls were pressed and another 500 were repressed. This was the first release for Bradford Cox under the Atlas Sound name. Cole Alexander is the lead singer of The Black Lips and Bradford Cox is the lead singer of Deerhunter.

== Track listing ==
Bradford Cox as Atlas Sound

1. "Alt, Alt, Alt"
2. "Magic Lotion"
3. "Onset"
4. "Shock Mountain"

Cole Alexander

1. "In My Mind"
2. "Fry"
3. "Garden of Eden"
4. "I Drank It Down"
5. "Full Moon (Ode to Half Moon Rising)"

== Credits ==
- Bradford Cox - music and lyrics
- Cole Alexander - music and lyrics
