= Spooky Action at a Distance =

Studio album by Lotus Plaza
- Released: April 2, 2012
- Genre: Indie rock, shoegaze, dream pop, neo-psychedelia
- Length: 44:02
- Label: Kranky
- Producer: C. Laszlo Koltay

Lotus Plaza chronology
The Floodlight Collective (2009)	Spooky Action at a Distance (2012)	Overnight Motorcycle Music EP (2014)

Spooky Action at a Distance is the second studio album by Lotus Plaza, a.k.a. Lockett Pundt, guitarist/vocalist/songwriter for Deerhunter. It was released on April 2, 2012 on Chicago-based label Kranky.

== Recording ==
Spooky Action at a Distance was recorded in 2011 in Detroit. Unlike The Floodlight Collective, Spooky Action at a Distance was written so that the songs could be easily played in a live performance. In addition, Pundt wanted more direct songs and less vocal reverberations compared to his previous album. Pundt played every instrument on the album. The album was dedicated to Pundt's grandmother Doris Fields, who died while Pundt was writing the album.

The first song written for Spooky Action at a Distance was "Strangers", followed by "Out of Touch". Both songs featured a kid's drum set Pundt bought from a thrift store. The slow down at the end of "Strangers" was Pundt wanting to have a "long, stretched-out feeling—sort of like changing the tape speed or putting a finger on a record and slowing it down." "Black Buzz" was influenced by Lee Hazlewood and was written about someone close to Pundt who has had addiction problems. "Dusty Rhodes" was written for Pundt's fiancée.

== Reception ==
Professional ratings
Review scores
Source	Rating
Allmusic	4/5 stars
Beats Per Minute	(68%)
Cokemachineglow	(80%)
Consequence of Sound	4/5 stars
Pitchfork	(8.4/10)
PopMatters	(6/10)
Prefix Magazine	(80%)

Spooky Action at a Distance has received generally positive reviews. On the review aggregate website Metacritic, the album has a score of 74 out of 100, indicating "generally favorable reviews".

Pitchfork Media's Ian Cohen gave the album a Best New Music designation, calling the album "one of the strongest indie rock records of the year so far." Consequence of Sound's David Dilillo was also positive, writing "Showcasing his most straightforward songwriting yet, Spooky Action at a Distance solidifies for us what Pundt has always been: a vital element of Deerhunter and an understated conjurer of rock reveries." Prefix Magazine's Jamieson Cox praised the album for balancing mainstream and experimental elements, writing "With Spooky Action at a Distance, Pundt proves he can walk the tightrope between listener-friendly anthems and cerebral digressions into edgier terrain with aplomb." Allmusic's Heather Phares described Spooky Action at a Distance as "[A] great showcase for his [Pundt's] winsome songs."

Beats Per Minute's Jay Lancaster, on the other hand, compared the album to Deerhunter, writing "In essence, if you've followed Deerhunter at all, you're not going to find Lotus Plaza to be anything groundbreaking." Lancaster concluded: "[I]f I don't revisit it, (and I might not, because it wasn't exactly mind-blowing), I appreciate it for at least being a pleasant listen." Ryan Reed of Popmatters also gave the album a mixed review, writing "[W]hen the intensity dies down, the results can be shapeless." Reed continued: "In many ways, we've heard all these songs before, in slightly tighter fashion, on the last two Deerhunter albums. Pundt may be sticking too close to his comfort zone, but there's enough magic here to hold him over until the next Deerhunter album."

== Accolades ==
Publication	Accolade	Rank	Ref.
Pitchfork	The Top 50 Albums of 2012	38	

== Track listing ==
1. "Untitled" - 1:25
2. "Strangers" - 4:30
3. "Out of Touch" - 4:33
4. "Dusty Rhodes" - 3:38
5. "White Galactic One" - 4:06
6. "Monoliths" - 3:35
7. "Jet Out of the Tundra" - 6:33
8. "Eveningness" - 5:05
9. "Remember Our Days" - 5:07
10. "Black Buzz" - 5:30

== Personnel ==
The following people contributed to Spooky Action at a Distance:

- Heba Kadry - Mastering
- C. Laszlo Koltay - Engineer, Mixing, Producer
- Lotus Plaza - Composer, Instrumentation
- Craig McCaffrey - Layout Assistance

== Charts ==
Chart (2012)	Peak position
US Billboard Independent Albums	46
US Billboard Top Heatseekers	7
Chart (2023)	Peak position
UK Progressive Albums (Official Charts)	18
UK Rock & Metal Albums (Official Charts)	20
