= Nicolas Vernhes =

French record producer and engineer

- Origin: Paris, France
- Genres: Indie rock, experimental rock
- Occupations: Record producer, recording engineer

Nicolas Jean Vernhes is a French record producer, recording engineer and record label owner. He is best known for his work with the American indie rock acts Animal Collective, Deerhunter, The Fiery Furnaces, Dirty Projectors, Wild Nothing and The War on Drugs.

Vernhes operates out of his own studio, Rare Book Room Studios, in Brooklyn, New York.

== Biography ==
Vernhes was raised in Paris, France, before moving to the United States at a young age: "I grew up in Paris and moved to the states when I was 12. I ended up in New York at 20 to finish college, thinking I might go back to France afterwards and knew I could not go back before living here. I never left."

Vernhes was also a member of the short-lived indie rock band Baby Tooth, playing guitar and backing vocals. The band released one single and an EP before becoming inactive in 1994. His studio, Rare Book Room Studios, is named after the band's EP of the same name.

== Discography ==
Year	Artist	Title	Credits
1994	Baby Tooth	Rare Book Room	Guitar, backing vocals
1995	Pumpernickel	Eponymous	Recording
1996	Guv'ner/Cat Power	Guv'ner Goes To Catpowerland	Recording
1996	Versus	Glitter of Love	Recording
1996	Versus	Yeah You	Recording
1996	Various Artists	State of the Union	Recording (track 74)
1996	Containe	Only Cowards Walk Like Cowards	Producer, recording (album), drums (track 6)
1996	Shove	Soundtrack For Disaster	Recording, mixing
1996	Evergreen	Evergreen	Recording
1996	Humidifier	Nothing Changes	Recording
1996	Guv'ner	The Hunt	Engineer
1996	Spent	A Seat Beneath The Chairs	Recording
1996	Spent	Umbrella Wars	Recording
1996	Versus	Deep Red	Recording, producer
1996	Versus	Secret Swingers	Recording
1996	Guv'ner	Break A Promise	Engineer
1996	Crown Heights	Dear Sir / Bricks	Recording, mixing
1996	Ruby Falls	Heroines	Engineer
1996	French	French	Recording
1997	Les Savy Fav	Rodeo	Recording
1997	Chisel	It's Alright, You're O.K.	Recording
1997	The Van Pelt	The Van Pelt	Recording
1997	Les Savy Fav	3/5	Recording, mixing, mastering
1997	Chisel	Set You Free	Recording
1997	The Pacific Ocean	Birds Don't Think They're Flying	Recording, producer
1997	Run On	Sit Down	Recording, mixing
1997	Run On	Scoot	Recording, mixing
1997	French	French 2	Recording
1997	The Feud	The Feud Versus Yr Universe	Recording
1998	The Lapse	Betrayal!	Recording
1998	Silver Jews	American Water	Producer
1998	Les Savy Fav	Our Coastal Hymn	Recording
1998	Versus	Two Cents Plus Tax	Recording
1998	Guv'ner	Spectral Worship	Mastering, recording, mixing
1998	Stratotanker	Trifecta	Engineer
1998	Dogbowl	The Zeppelin Record	Engineer, mixing
1998	Doug Gillard	Malamute Jute	Mastering
1998	Various Artists	Never Kept A Diary	Mixing, recording
1998	Hippopotamus/Project 3	3Sounds	Engineer
1998	Françoiz Breut	Ma Colère	Recording
1999	Various Artists	Everything Is Nice (The Matador Records 10th Anniversary Anthology)	Recording, engineer
1999	Dominique A.	Remué	Recording
1999	Versus	Afterglow	Recording, producer
1999	Les Savy Fav	The Cat and the Cobra	Producer
1999	Bonnie Prince Billy	Let's Start A Family	Recording
1999	Perio	Medium Crash	Recording, mixing, producer
1999	Fly Ashtray	Sawgrass Subligette	Mastering
1999	Pilot to Gunner	It's So Good To Be Here In Paris	Recording
1999	The Pacific Ocean	Less Than The Needle, More Than The Shotgun	Producer, recording
2000	Cat Power	The Covers Record	Engineer
2000	Various Artists	Elysian Fields	Recording
2000	David Grubbs	The Spectrum Between	Recording
2000	Les Savy Fav	Rome	Recording
2000	The Lapse	Heaven Ain't Happenin'	Recording
2000	Tara Jane O'Neil	Peregrine	Mixing
2000	Hall of Fame	Hall of Fame	Mixing
2000	The Holy Childhood	Up With What I'm Down With	Recording, engineer
2000	David Grubbs	The Coxcomb/Avocado	Recording
2000	Unwound/Versus	Torch Song/All In Doubt	Recording
2000	Fischerspooner	Fischerspooner	Producer
2000	Various Artists	[Technology] (A Compilation of Remixes)	Recording
2000	Various Artists	Rubic Records 01	Engineer
2000	Reid Paley	Revival	Recording, mixing
2000	The Hong Kong	Lights at Night	Recording
2001	Fischerspooner	Emerge	Producer
2001	David Grubbs	Thirty Minute Raven	Mastering
2001	Hall of Fame	Hall of Fame	Mixing
2001	Theo Angell	Sun and Steel: The Lost Recordings of Yukio Mishima	Mixing, mastering
2001	k. (Karla Schickele)	New Problems	Mixing
2001	Dan Brown	Inner Boroughs	Recording, mixing
2001	David Grubbs	Rickets & Scurvy	Recording, electronics
2002	Black Dice	Beaches & Canyons	Recording
2002	Black Dice	Lost Valley	Mixing
2002	Out Hud	S.T.R.E.E.T. D.A.D.	Recording
2002	The Rogers Sisters	Purely Evil	Recording, mixing
2002	Speedking	The Fist and the Laurels	Producer, mixing
2002	David Grubbs	Act Five Scene One	Mastering
2002	The Naysayer	Heaven, Hell, or Houston	Mixing, mastering
2002	David Waxman	Ultra. 80's vs Electro 01	Producer
2002	Dominique A.	Le Détour	Recording, mixing, drums
2002	Panthers	Are You Down??	Recording
2002	Ted Leo and the Pharmacists/K.	"Bridges, Squares" / "I Wouldn't Mind"	Recording engineer, mixing (track 2)
2002	The Feud	Language Is Technology	Recording engineer, mixing
2002	Pour, Rip...No!	Untitled	Recording engineer
2002	Blood on The Wall	"Baby Likes to Holler" / "The Walking Dead"	Recording engineer
2003	Ted Leo and the Pharmacists	Hearts of Oak	Recording, producer
2003	Animal Collective	Here Comes the Indian	Engineer
2003	The Fiery Furnaces	Gallowsbird's Bark	Engineer, mastering
2004	The Fiery Furnaces	Blueberry Boat	Engineer, mixing, drums
2007	Deerhunter	Cryptograms	Mixing
2007	Deerhunter	Fluorescent Grey	Mixing
2007	Animal Collective	Strawberry Jam	Engineer, mixing, tracking
2008	Animal Collective	Water Curses	Mixing, tracking
2008	Deerhunter	Microcastle	Engineer, mixing, keyboards
2008	Stephen Malkmus and the Jicks	Real Emotional Trash	Mixing
2009	Various Artists	Dark Was the Night	Engineer, mixing
2009	Deerhunter	Rainwater Cassette Exchange	Engineer
2009	Spoon	Got Nuffin	Engineer
2009	Dirty Projectors	Bitte Orca	Additional production, mixing
2010	Spoon	Transference	Engineer, mixing
2010	Dirty Projectors & Björk	Mount Wittenberg Orca	Engineer, mixing
2011	Sondre Lerche	Sondre Lerche	Co-producer, mixing, engineer
2011	Atlas Sound	Parallax	Producer, engineer, mixing, programming
2012	Daniel Rossen	Silent Hour/Golden Mile	Mixing
2012	Wild Nothing	Nocturne	Producer, engineer, mixing
2013	Deerhunter	Monomania	Producer, engineer
2013	Wise Blood	Id	Co-producer, engineer, mixing
2014	The War on Drugs	Lost in the Dream	Engineer, mixing, organ, tambourine
2014	Avi Buffalo	At Best Cuckold	Mixing
2014	Moodoïd	Le Monde Möö	Producer, engineer, mixing
2014	She Keeps Bees	Eight Houses	Producer, engineer, mixing
2014	The Van Pelt	Imaginary Third	Mixing, recording
2015	TORRES	Sprinter	Mixing
2015	Speedy Ortiz	Foil Deer	Producer, mixing
2015	Jaakko Eino Kalevi	Jaakko Eino Kalevi	Mixing
2015	Small Black	Best Blues	Mixing
2016	Daughter	Not to Disappear	Producer, mixing
2016	School of Seven Bells	SVIIB	Engineer
2016	Deakin	Sleep Cycle	Recording, mixing
2016	Steve Gunn	Eyes on the Lines	Mixing
2017	Strand of Oaks	Hard Love	Producer, engineer, mixing, various instruments
2017	The War on Drugs	A Deeper Understanding	Engineer
2018	Ought	Room Inside the World	Producer, various instruments
2018	Flasher	Constant Image	Producer
2018	Roadhouses	Roadhouses	Producer, mixing, synths
2918	Fraser A. Gorman	Eazy Dazy	Mixing, producer
2019	Cat Clyde	All The Black	Producer
2019	Patti Yang Group	War on Love	Mixing
2019	Kotokoto	Institute	Recording, writer
2020	Endless Boogie/Weak Signal	Jerome/Rolex	Recording
2020	Pia Fraus	The New Water	Producer, mixing
2021	Small Black	Cheap Dreams	Mixing
2021	Derek Piotr	Making And Then Unmaking	Technician
2021	Opera Alaska	Hope/Staying	Mixing
2021	Mazey Haze	Always Dancing	Mixing
2022	Moss	HX	Mixing
2022	Beau	Forever (and More)	Producer, engineer
2022	Slang	Cockroach in a Ghost Town	Mixing, mastering
2022	The Hated	Best Piece of Shit Vol. 4	Mixing, transferring
2023	Gold Dime	No More Blue Skies	Mixing
2024	Cig Corpse	So Sick	Mixing
2024	The Hated	Flux	Mixing, transferring
2024	Satchel Hart	How to Succeed in Business and Then Die Anyway	Mixing
2025	Terno Rei	Nenhuma Estrela	Mixing
2026	Kiwi Jr.	Blowin' Up	Mixing
2026	Francis of Delirium	Run, Run Pure Beauty	Mixing
2026	Wintersleep	Wishing Moon	Producer
