= Such a Shame (disambiguation) =

"Such a Shame" is a Talk Talk song.

Such a Shame may also refer to:

- "Such a Shame" (Bee Gees song)
- "Such a Shame", a song by The Cranberries, released first in the single "Just My Imagination" and then the album Bury the Hatchet
- "Such a Shame", a song by The Kinks in Kinkdom

== See also ==
- "Fluorescent Grey/Oh, It's Such A Shame", a single by Jay Reatard and Deerhunter
- "It's Such a Shame", a song by The Static Jacks from the album If You're Young
