= Fading Frontier =

Studio album by Deerhunter
- Released: October 16, 2015
- Genres: Experimental rock; dream pop; pop rock
- Length: 36:02
- Label: 4AD
- Producers: Deerhunter; Ben H. Allen

Deerhunter chronology
| Monomania (2013) | Fading Frontier (2015) | Why Hasn't Everything Already Disappeared? (2019) |

Singles from Fading Frontier
- 1. "Snakeskin" Released: August 16, 2015; 2. "Breaker" Released: September 15, 2015; 3. "Living My Life" Released: October 13, 2015

Fading Frontier is the seventh studio album by American indie rock band Deerhunter, released on October 16, 2015, on 4AD. Produced by Ben H. Allen, who had previously worked with the band on Halcyon Digest (2010), and the band itself, the album was preceded by the singles "Snakeskin", "Breaker" and "Living My Life".

== Background ==
In December 2014, Bradford Cox was involved in a car crash which left him "seriously injured, but also provided a perspective-giving jolt". Prior to the release of Fading Frontier, Cox stated that the accident "erased all illusions" and admitted that it was a definite turning point for him. Fading Frontier is Deerhunter's and Cox's first release since the accident. This album saw the departure of Frankie Broyles, who left the band in 2015 to focus on his solo career. The song "Ad Astra" contains an interpolation of Bascom Lamar Lunsford's "I Wish I Was a Mole in the Ground".

== Release and promotion ==
Fading Frontier was announced via a countdown timer on Deerhunter's website, which ended on August 16, 2015.

The first single released was "Snakeskin" on August 17, followed by "Breaker" on September 15, of which the music video was directed by Cox himself.

The cover art for the album is a photograph titled "Zuma" by the artist John Divola.

== Critical reception ==
Professional ratings
Aggregate scores
| Source | Rating |
|---|---|
| AnyDecentMusic? | 7.7/10 |
| Metacritic | 81/100 |
Review scores
| Source | Rating |
| AllMusic | 4/5 stars |
| The A.V. Club | A− |
| The Guardian | 4/5 stars |
| The Irish Times | 4/5 stars |
| Mojo | 4/5 stars |
| NME | 5/5 |
| Pitchfork | 8.4/10 |
| Q | 3/5 stars |
| Rolling Stone | 3.5/5 stars |
| Spin | 9/10 |

At Metacritic, which assigns a normalized rating out of 100 to reviews from mainstream critics, the album has received an average score of 81, based on 27 reviews, indicating "universal acclaim".

Consequence critic Sheldon Pearce wrote that the album is "one more gem from a well-traveled band that's still finding new territory to explore." NME critic Barry Nicholson praised the record and gave it a perfect score, describing it as "a remarkable album, one that only grows more awesome with each listen." Ian Cohen of Pitchfork awarded the album with a "Best New Music" tag and wrote: "If there isn't a Deerhunter sound, there's a Deerhunter perspective that runs through their work, best summed up in 'All the Same'—'take your handicaps/ Channel them and feed them back/ Until they become your strengths.' The weird era continues." In The Guardian, Alex Petridis noted the album's more mainstream sound: "there are so many straightforwardly commercial-sounding songs here," he observed, "that Fading Frontier could conceivably be an album that turns Deerhunter from cult concern into mainstream success." Citing a lack of angst and urgency in comparison to previous efforts, Exclaim!'s Anna Alger wrote that "On Fading Frontier, Deerhunter focus on their ability as a band to hypnotize and confound, which make the explosive moments here stand out that much more."

In a less favorable review, Clash critic Sam Walker-Smart wrote that the record "is by no means a poor album, and truth be told really doesn't possess a bad number on it." Nevertheless, he added: "When the oddities on this album ride so high they should have let complete weirdness take over."

=== Accolades ===
| Publication | Accolade | Year | Rank |
|---|---|---|---|
| The Guardian | The Best Albums of 2015 | 2015 | 12 |
| NME | NME's Albums of the Year 2015 | 2015 | 14 |
| Pitchfork | The 50 Best Albums of 2015 | 2015 | 30 |
| Pitchfork | Readers' Top 50 Albums | 2015 | 14 |
| Stereogum | The 50 Best Albums of 2015 | 2015 | 42 |

== Track listing ==
All tracks are written by Bradford Cox, except where noted.

| No. | Title | Writer(s) | Length |
|---|---|---|---|
| 1. | "All the Same" | | 3:05 |
| 2. | "Living My Life" | | 3:49 |
| 3. | "Breaker" | | 3:31 |
| 4. | "Duplex Planet" | | 2:40 |
| 5. | "Take Care" | | 4:12 |
| 6. | "Leather and Wood" | | 5:55 |
| 7. | "Snakeskin" | | 4:20 |
| 8. | "Ad Astra" | Lockett Pundt | 5:32 |
| 9. | "Carrion" | | 2:58 |

- The last thirty seconds of Ad Astra consists of Bradford Cox performing the traditional folk song I Wish I Was a Mole in the Ground.

== Personnel ==
Credits are adapted from the album's liner notes.

Deerhunter

- Bradford Cox – design, layout, lead vocals, guitar, percussion, keyboards, electronics, additional photography
- Lockett Pundt – guitar, keyboards, co-lead vocals (3), lead vocals (8)
- Moses Archuleta – drums
- Josh McKay – bass

Additional musicians

- Simon Halliday – Remington shotgun (1)
- Tim Gane – electric harpsichord (4)
- Holger Zapp – electric harpsichord (4)
- Cole Alexander – "brutalist percussion" (5)
- Ben H. Allen – additional synthesizer (5)
- James Cargill – Roland RS-09 (5), Sony TC377 (5), tape manipulation (5)
- Faulker (Cox's dog) – vocal cameo (7)
- Zumi Rosow – treated alto saxophone (7)

Production

- Deerhunter – producer, mixing
- Ben H. Allen – producer, mixing
- Bob Ludwig – mastering
- Bob Jackson – mastering assistant
- Jason Kingsland – recording
- Sumner Jones – recording
- Jeff Fisher – recording (4)
- Zach Pyles – recording assistant
- Ben Etter – studio assistant
- Josh Bush – studio assistant
- Patrick Feeley – studio assistant
- Spencer Vaughan – studio assistant
- Ryan Stang – assistant to the band

Artwork

- John Divola – cover photograph
- Ryan Stang – band photograph
- Alison Fielding – layout assistance
- Phil Laslett – digital imaging assistance

== Charts ==
| Chart (2015) | Peak position |
|---|---|
| Australian Albums (ARIA) | 74 |
| Belgian Albums (Ultratop Flanders) | 75 |
| Belgian Albums (Ultratop Wallonia) | 89 |
| Dutch Albums (Album Top 100) | 54 |
| Irish Albums (IRMA) | 45 |
| UK Albums (Official Charts) | 53 |
| US Billboard 200 | 72 |
| US Independent Albums (Billboard) | 10 |
