= Vox Celeste 5 =

Single by Deerhunter
- A-side: "Vox Celeste 5"
- B-side: "Microcastle Mellow 3"
- Released: August 28, 2009
- Recorded: 2009
- Length: 6:32
- Label: Sub Pop

Deerhunter singles chronology
"Nothing Ever Happened" (2008)	"Vox Celeste 5" (2009)	"Revival" (2010)

"Vox Celeste 5" is a Deerhunter single released as part of the third edition of Sub Pop's Singles Club. Units were set to ship out in June 2009, but due to delays were not released until August 28. The records were pressed in a limited set of 1,500 on yellow vinyl. The tracks that appear here are re-workings of songs that initially appeared on Microcastle and Weird Era Cont. To date, it is the only release by Deerhunter to appear on Sub Pop.

== Track listing ==
1. "Vox Celeste 5" - 3:26
2. "Microcastle Mellow 3" - 3:06
