= Atlas Sound/Mexcellent Split =

EP by Atlas Sound/Mexcellent
- Released: March 10th, 2007
- Recorded: Park Avenue, Grant Park, Atlanta, 2006
- Genre: Ambient, indie rock
- Label: HOSS Records HOSS008

Opposite Side
- Mexcellent Side

Atlas Sound/Mexcellent Split was released in 2007 on 12" vinyl. Only 500 copies were pressed on 180g vinyl. The Atlas Sound side is called Fractal Trax and the Mexcellent side is called Cornbread Jungle.

== Track listing ==
Atlas Sound - Fractal Trax

1. "Axis I (F.Grey)"
2. "Axis II"
3. "Inhalents"
4. "'I Know, I Know'"

Mexcellent - Cornbread Jungle

1. "Rhonda Price"
2. "Blackface"
3. "RGDWTJPM"

== Credits ==
Atlas Sound

- Bradford Cox - voice, electric and acoustic guitar, percussion, bells, tape, electric bass.

Mexcellent

- V. Fajito - music
- R. Mexico - music
