= The Floodlight Collective =

Studio album by Lotus Plaza
- Released: March 23, 2009
- Genre: Ambient; shoegaze
- Label: Kranky
- Producer: Brian Foote

Lotus Plaza chronology
The Floodlight Collective (2009)	Spooky Action at a Distance (2012)

Professional ratings
Review scores
Source	Rating
Pitchfork Media	(6.8/10)
Tiny Mix Tapes	3.5/5 stars
AllMusic	4/5 stars

The Floodlight Collective is the first studio album by Lotus Plaza, released March 23, 2009, although recording on the album began in 2007. The album was produced by Brian Foote of the band Nudge. Musically, the album is similar to the work of Deerhunter and Atlas Sound, the solo project of Deerhunter's lead vocalist Bradford Cox. Marc Hogan of Pitchfork Media found that "Pundt at times lets his diffidence get the best of him", and that the album's musical elements "can begin to run together." However, Hogan suspects "That's probably the point…The Floodlight Collective is a mostly elegant listen, and one whose failings are part of its theme: Like a vague recollection, it's still a little hard to hold on to after it's over—pretty albeit somewhat ephemeral."

== Artwork ==
The album's artwork was created by Pundt himself. The photo featured prominently is an "old family picture" of his younger brother Matt. The font was created with white-out and printer toner ink.

== Track listing ==
1. "Red Oak Way" – 4:12
2. "Quicksand" – 5:09
3. "These Years" – 2:54
4. "Different Mirrors" – 4:07
5. "Whiteout" – 4:13
6. "What Grows?" – 2:55
7. "Sunday Night" – 4:55
8. "Antoine" – 7:22
9. "The Floodlight Collective" – 4:36
10. "A Threaded Needle" – 4:29

== Personnel ==
- Lockett Pundt – Vocals, Rhythm Guitar
- Bradford Cox – Drums on Different Mirrors
