= Monomania (Deerhunter album) =

Studio album by Deerhunter
- Released: May 7, 2013
- Recorded: January–February 2013
- Studios: Rare Book Room (Brooklyn, New York)
- Genre: Garage rock
- Length: 43:21
- Label: 4AD
- Producers: Deerhunter; Nicolas Vernhes

Deerhunter chronology
Halcyon Digest (2010)	Monomania (2013)	Fading Frontier (2015)

Monomania is the sixth studio album by American indie rock band Deerhunter, released on May 7, 2013, on 4AD. Produced by both the band and Nicolas Vernhes, the album is the first to feature bassist Josh McKay, and is the only studio album to feature guitarist Frankie Broyles.

The album received universal acclaim upon its release. Monomania reached number seventy-three on the UK Albums Chart.

== Background ==
The album's title is a reference to lead singer Bradford Cox's obsessive traits. In 2015, Cox reflected on his life while writing, recording and promoting Monomania, stating: "I was actually going through a deep period of passionate rage. [...] That was what I was like at that time: a mixed-up wreck. Monomania was a very hateful record, and I mistreated a lot of people around me. I was in a lot of pain and very lonely. But there was also a big sense of humor; I never lose my sense of humor."

== Recording and release ==
The album was recorded at Rare Book Room Studio in Brooklyn, with producer Nicolas Vernhes, who also produced Microcastle and Rainwater Cassette Exchange.

The album's title is a reference to lead singer Bradford Cox’s obsessive traits. According to Lockett Pundt and Cox, Pierre Schaeffer, Steve Reich, and Bo Diddley were major influences on the album, along with the artists such as Ramones and Ricky Nelson. Bradford Cox noted, "I can't hold a match to that stuff and I never will. I'll never be black, I'll never have that experience. That's what's missing from indie culture, though: Bo Diddley and blackness. There's a struggle that exists in black music and hillbilly music from a certain era. Old music resonates with me, new music doesn't." Cox also described the album as "a very avant-garde rock & roll record".

In 2015, Cox reflected on Monomania and its reception: "I really think Monomania was a successful record artistically, and I don’t think people view it that way. I think it’s viewed as an exhausted misstep. Frankly, I feel a lot stronger about Monomania [than 2015's Fading Frontier]. Monomania was a case where I set out to accomplish, and I was able to execute, very much what I wanted to. In that way it was a success. I don’t give a shit how many copies it sold or how it got reviewed."

== Reception ==
Professional ratings
Aggregate scores
Source	Rating
AnyDecentMusic?	7.7/10
Metacritic	81/100
Review scores
Source	Rating
AllMusic	3.5/5 stars
The A.V. Club	B+
Entertainment Weekly	B+
The Guardian	3/5 stars
MSN Music (Expert Witness)	A
NME	8/10
Pitchfork	8.3/10
Q	4/5 stars
Rolling Stone	3.5/5 stars
Spin	9/10

=== Critical ===
Monomania received acclaim from critics upon its release. At Metacritic, which assigns a normalized rating out of 100 to reviews from mainstream critics, the album has received an average score of 81, based on 41 reviews, indicating "universal acclaim".

Ian Cohen of Pitchfork gave the album a "Best New Music" designation, writing "Monomania is certainly a strong effort on its own merits, and more importantly, they’ve avoided making their deflating "diminishing returns" record [..] that casts doubts about whether they've gone too far down the same path. They've pulled off something admirable in making an illogical left turn feel like the logical next step where one didn't exist." Spin's Marc Hogan also praised the album, writing "An impishly brilliant 12-song set of scruffy garage rock with moments of dreamy shimmer, Monomania leaves no confusion about what sort of band Deerhunter are: one that won't stoop to conquer."

Slant Magazine's Kevin Liedel, on the other hand, gave the album a mixed review, writing "A catalogue of trailing ellipses and blank thought balloons, the album is hardly characteristic of the band's fastidious mien. Whereas both Deerhunter and Atlas Sound albums typically reflect the obsessive brilliance and meticulous pathos of Cox's personality, there's few signs of either on Monomania, which is in dire need of a little less impulse and a bit more OCD."

At the end of 2013, Pitchfork placed Monomania at number 30 on its list of the 50 best albums of the year, with critic Aaron Lietko writing, "It's not a record that pleased all the band's fans, particularly those who prefer their epic space-rock turns, but it's a compelling left-field turn that shores up Deerhunter's other big strength: unpredictability." In "Run It Back: Beats Per Minute's Top 50 Albums of 2013," John Amen wrote, "Throughout Monomania, Deerhunter showcase their versatility, drawing from multiple playbooks. Cox, meanwhile, revels in mysterious yet emotionally accessible songs, frequently occurring as a born-in-the-garage and punk-nursed reincarnation of John Lennon. Placing hi-fi concepts and compositions in a lo-fi setting, Monomania is arguably Deerhunter’s most consummate outing." Robert Christgau placed the album at number 14 on his "Dean's List" for 2013.

=== Commercial ===
The album debuted at No. 41 on the Billboard 200 albums chart on its release, selling around 10,000 copies in the United States in its first week. It also debuted at No. 12 on Billboard's Top Rock Albums, and No. 10 on the Alternative Albums chart. The album has sold 33,000 copies in the United States as of October 2015.

== Track listing ==
All tracks are written by Bradford Cox except for "The Missing" written by Lockett Pundt.

No.	Title	Length
1.	"Neon Junkyard"	2:52
2.	"Leather Jacket II"	3:09
3.	"The Missing"	3:41
4.	"Pensacola"	4:00
5.	"Dream Captain"	3:02
6.	"Blue Agent"	3:30
7.	"T.H.M."	4:19
8.	"Sleepwalking"	3:08
9.	"Back to the Middle"	2:37
10.	"Monomania"	5:19
11.	"Nitebike"	4:17
12.	"Punk (La vie antérieure)"	3:27

== Personnel ==
=== Deerhunter ===
- Bradford Cox – vocals (1–2, 4–12), percussion (3, 5, 6, 7, 9, 10), tapes (1, 2, 6, 10), acoustic guitar (1, 6, 11), electric rhythm guitar (4, 12), guitar (5), electric melody bass (12), synthesizer (3), organ (5), gamelan (2), treatments (3), little instruments (5), fog machine (1), metal box (9)
- Lockett Pundt – electric rhythm guitar (1, 2, 3, 5, 6, 8), electric lead guitar (3, 4, 9, 10), lead vocals (3), octave lead guitar (2), low guitar (7) acoustic guitar (9, 12), percussion (5), field recording (10)
- Moses Archuleta – drums, percussion (1), videos (1), auxiliary hi-hat (3)
- Frankie Broyles – electric lead guitar (1, 2, 5, 6, 8), electric guitar (3), electric rhythm guitar (9, 10), steel guitar (4), high guitar (7), acoustic guitar (12), field recording (10)
- Josh McKay – bass guitar, farfisa (9), Wurlitzer (9), Baldwin organ (9)

=== Recording personnel ===
- Nicolas Vernhes – producer, recording
- Deerhunter – producer
- Bradford Cox – recording
- Gabe Wax – assistant engineer
- Joe Lambert – mastering

=== Artwork ===
- Winston Parker – "Neon Calligraphy"
- Robert Semmer – photography
- Proenza Schouler – clothing and direction
- Matt de Jong – art direction
- Bradford Cox – art direction

== Chart positions ==
Chart (2013)	Peak position
Belgian Albums (Ultratop Flanders)	84
Belgian Albums (Ultratop Wallonia)	130
Dutch Albums (Album Top 100)	79
Irish Albums (IRMA)	68
Japanese Albums (Oricon)	95
UK Albums (Official Charts)	71
UK Independent Albums (Official Charts)	17
US Billboard 200	41
US Top Alternative Albums (Billboard)	10
US Independent Albums (Billboard)	6
US Top Rock Albums (Billboard)	12
US Indie Store Album Sales (Billboard)	2
