= Josh McKay (musician) =

American musician

- Genre: Indie rock
- Instrument: Bass guitar
- Label: 4AD
- Website: www.deerhuntermusic.com

Josh McKay is an American musician best known as the bass guitarist for the indie rock band Deerhunter, with whom he has recorded three studio albums. He began his career in 1987, playing bass in Aleka's Attic alongside friends and band mates River Phoenix and Rain Phoenix.

After relocating to Athens, GA, McKay became a founding member and front man of post-rock band Macha and also joined the shoegaze band Mice Parade. In 2003, he played guitar and keyboard for the band The New Year formed by his friends Matt and Bubba Kadane.

Josh McKay, in 2010, participated in a music video inside an album called False Priest, made by the band of Montreal. The video itself is Famine Affair, where McKay was portrayed as a man who lived inside an Earth where women dominated. There is only one man per household, who is used to breed until he dies, or becomes sexually impotent.

McKay has also recorded solo material under the monikers Seaworthy, The Corsican and Abandon the Earth Mission.

== Career ==
In 2002, McKay released a solo album, entitled The Ride, under the moniker, Seaworthy. The album was well received by Pitchfork, with reviewer Christopher Dare writing: "The narrative flow is enthralling. [...] It's the first good 2002 album I've heard."

McKay joined Deerhunter in early 2013, following the departure of longtime bassist Josh Fauver.

== Discography ==
with Deerhunter

- Monomania (2013)
- Fading Frontier (2015)
- Why Hasn't Everything Already Disappeared? (2019)

with Macha

- Macha (1998)
- See It Another Way (1999)
- Macha Loved Bedhead (2000)
- Forget Tomorrow (2004)

with Mice Parade

- What It Means to Be Left-Handed (2010)

as Seaworthy

- The Ride (2002)
