= Why Hasn't Everything Already Disappeared? =

Studio album by Deerhunter
- Released: January 18, 2019
- Recorded: 2018
- Studio: Marfa Recording, Marfa, TX; Sonic Ranch, TX; Seahorse Sound, Los Angeles; Maze, Atlanta; Attic of B. Cox, Grant Park, Atlanta
- Length: 36:10
- Label: 4AD
- Producer: Cate Le Bon; Ben H. Allen III; Ben Etter; Deerhunter

Deerhunter chronology
Fading Frontier (2015)	Why Hasn't Everything Already Disappeared? (2019)

Singles from Why Hasn't Everything Already Disappeared?
- 1. "Death in Midsummer" Released: October 30, 2018; 2. "Element" Released: December 6, 2018; 3. "Plains" Released: January 9, 2019

Professional ratings
Aggregate scores
Source	Rating
AnyDecentMusic?	7.7/10
Metacritic	82/100
Review scores
Source	Rating
AllMusic	4/5 stars
The A.V. Club	B
The Guardian	4/5 stars
The Independent	4/5 stars
Mojo	4/5 stars
NME	4/5 stars
Pitchfork	8.0/10
Q	4/5 stars
The Times	4/5 stars
Uncut	8/10

Why Hasn't Everything Already Disappeared? is the eighth studio album by the American indie rock band Deerhunter, and their final release before their hiatus. It was released on January 18, 2019, on 4AD. The album was co-produced by singer-songwriter Cate Le Bon, Ben H. Allen (who had previously worked with the band on Halcyon Digest and Fading Frontier), Ben Etter (who worked as a studio assistant on Fading Frontier) and the band itself. The first single, "Death in Midsummer", was released on October 30, 2018. The same day, a world tour in support of the album was announced, starting on November 4, 2018. The second single from the album, "Element", was released on December 6, 2018. The album leaked on December 12, 2018.

Lead singer Bradford Cox described the album as a "science fiction album about the present."

== Title ==
The album's title is a reference to the posthumously published book of the same name by French philosopher Jean Baudrillard. Bradford Cox explained that he was "attracted less to the content of the book and more to this idea of a philosopher who spends his entire career predicting the disappearance of [culture], and then, on his deathbed, realizes it hasn't completely happened on its own during his lifetime. There's something sad and infinitely melancholy about that." Cox described the title as a "beautiful picture frame" for the songs he wrote for the album.

== Accolades ==
Publication	Accolade	Rank	Ref.
Gothamist	Top 26 Albums of 2019	21	
Magnet	Top 25 Albums of 2019	18	
No Ripcord	Top 50 Albums of 2019	13	
Piccadilly Records	Top 100 Albums of 2019	16	
Under the Radar	Top 100 Albums of 2019	22	

== Track listing ==
All tracks are written by Bradford Cox, except "Tarnung" by Lockett Pundt.

No.	Title	Length
1.	"Death in Midsummer"	4:22
2.	"No One’s Sleeping"	4:26
3.	"Greenpoint Gothic"	2:02
4.	"Element"	3:00
5.	"What Happens to People?"	4:16
6.	"Détournement"	3:26
7.	"Futurism"	2:52
8.	"Tarnung"	3:08
9.	"Plains"	2:13
10.	"Nocturne"	6:25
Total length:		36:10

== Personnel ==
Credits adapted from the 4AD website, except where noted.

Deerhunter

- Bradford Cox – vocals; electric and acoustic guitars; synthesizer; percussion; auxiliary drums; piano; Chamberlin; tapes; mandolin
- Lockett Pundt – electric, acoustic, slide, and twelve string guitars; organ; piano; mandolin; electric harpsichord; synthesizer; vocals
- Moses Archuleta – drums; synthesizer; mandolin
- Josh McKay – bass; marimba; piano, contrabass, electric piano; bells
- Javier Morales – piano; electric piano; Chamberlin; tenor saxophone; marimba; bass synthesizer; bass clarinet; contrabass

Additional musicians

- Cate Le Bon – harpsichord on "Death in Midsummer", vocals on "Tarnung", mandolin on "No One's Sleeping"
- Tim Presley – abstract lead guitar on "Futurism"
- Ben H. Allen III – synthetic bass system on "Plains"
- Ian Horrocks – contrabass on "Nocturne"
- James Cox – bass vocals on "Element"

Technical

- Ben Etter – engineering, mixing
- Samur Khouja – engineering
- Ben H. Allen III – mixing
- Bradford Cox – engineering, mixing
- Heba Kadry – mastering

== Charts ==
Chart (2019)	Peak position
Belgian Albums (Ultratop Flanders)	62
Belgian Albums (Ultratop Wallonia)	119
French Albums (SNEP)	127
Scottish Albums (OCC)	28
Spanish Albums (PROMUSICAE)	53
Swiss Albums (Schweizer Hitparade)	43
UK Albums (OCC)	89
US Billboard 200	192
US Top Alternative Albums (Billboard)	23
US Top Rock Albums (Billboard)	40
