= Moses Archuleta =

American drummer

- Also known as: Moon Diagrams
- Genres: Indie rock, art rock
- Instruments: Drums, keyboards
- Years active: 2001–present
- Member of: Deerhunter

Moses Archuleta is an American drummer and multi-instrumentalist. He is best known as the drummer, occasional keyboardist and co-founder of the indie rock band Deerhunter, with whom he has recorded eight studio albums.

Archuleta also records solo material under the name Moon Diagrams, releasing an EP, Care Package, in 2015. His first Moon Diagrams studio album, Lifetime Of Love was released on June 30, 2017. A second Moon Diagrams studio album, Cemetery Classics, was released in on June 21, 2024. It was recorded with producer James Ford, and featured collaborations from Cindy Lee, Anastasia Coope and Gang Gang Dance's Josh Diamond.

== Personal life ==
Archuleta is of Korean and Hispanic descent. Regarding his upbringing he states, "I was an army brat, so I grew up all over the place. Never in the city, always small towns and suburbs."

From 2005 to 2007, Archuleta worked in an American Apparel store as a Back Stock Manager. Prior to this, he worked in a "vintage clothing store".

== Discography ==
=== with Deerhunter ===
- Turn It Up Faggot (2005)
- Cryptograms (2007)
- Microcastle (2008)
- Weird Era Cont. (2008)
- Halcyon Digest (2010)
- Monomania (2013)
- Fading Frontier (2015)
- Why Hasn't Everything Already Disappeared? (2019)

=== as Moon Diagrams ===
Studio albums

- Lifetime of Love (2017)
- Cemetery Classics (2024)

EPs

- Care Package (2015)
- Trappy Bats (2019)
