= Fluorescent Grey / Oh, It's Such a Shame =

"Fluorescent Grey/Oh, It's Such A Shame"

Single by Jay Reatard and Deerhunter
- A-side: "Fluorescent Grey"
- B-side: "Oh, It's Such A Shame"
- Released: July 22, 2008
- Recorded: Side A recorded at Shattered Studios, Memphis, TN., May 2008. Side B recorded at Rare Book Room, NYC, April 2008.
- Genre: Punk rock, indie rock
- Label: Matador Records
- Producer(s): Side A by Jay Reatard. Side B by Nicholas Vernhes

"Fluorescent Grey/Oh, It's Such A Shame" is a split single by Jay Reatard and Deerhunter featuring both artists covering songs by each other. The single was the fourth edition in a series put on by Jay Reatard on Matador Records throughout the year 2008.

== Track listing ==
1. "Fluorescent Grey" by Jay Reatard - 4:41 (Originally appears on Fluorescent Grey)
2. "Oh, It's Such A Shame" by Deerhunter - 3:52 (Originally appears on Blood Visions)
