= Lockett Pundt =

Musical artist (born 1982)

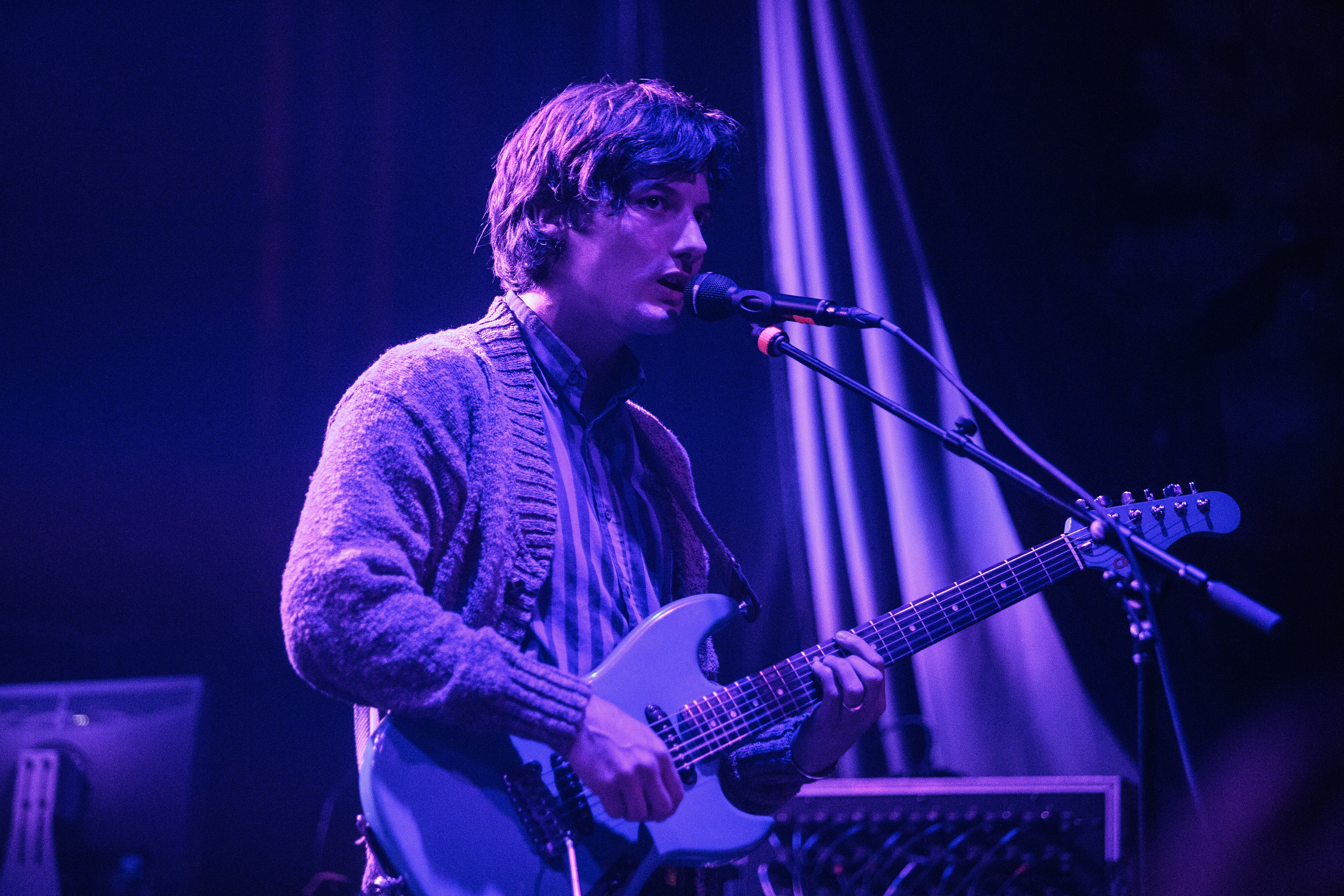
- Pundt performing with Deerhunter at Royale in Boston, Massachusetts in 2015

Background information
- Also known as: Lotus Plaza
- Born: Lockett James Pundt IV; October 7, 1982 (age 43)
- Origin: Marietta, Georgia, United States
- Genres: Indie rock; shoegaze; ambient; dream pop
- Occupations: Musician; singer; songwriter
- Instruments: Guitar; vocals; drums
- Years active: 2005–present
- Labels: Kranky; 4AD

Lockett James Pundt IV (born October 7, 1982) is an American musician and multi-instrumentalist. He is the guitarist and occasional lead vocalist of Atlanta-based indie rock group Deerhunter which he joined in 2005. Pundt also releases solo material under the name Lotus Plaza.

== Musical career ==
=== Deerhunter ===
Pundt met Deerhunter vocalist Bradford Cox at Harrison High School in Kennesaw, Georgia. In a 2009 interview, Pundt described meeting Cox:

"I was summoned by this girl who was in a drama class of mine named Lauren. She told me that Brad wanted to meet me more or less... It was arranged to go down in the bus ports between class... And so we met in the bus port".

In an interview with Pitchfork Media, Cox discussed the sensations he felt meeting Pundt for the first time:

"I was attracted to him, but not in some kind of like, just physical way. I was attracted to his melancholy, his sitting alone, staring at the ground… I immediately fell in love right then at first sight".

The two played together in a three-piece band known as The Floodlight Collective. "It wasn’t anything serious really, just sort of jam on stuff and have fun…It was one of the first musical experiences that I shared with other people". The band later inspired the name of Pundt's first album as Lotus Plaza. In 2005, Pundt joined Deerhunter as a guitarist; the first album he helped produce with the band was their second album, Cryptograms (2007). Since joining Deerhunter, Pundt has contributed songwriting/lead vocals on at least one song on all of their six subsequent albums and two EPs.

Pundt has cited his greatest musical influences as being Stereolab, My Bloody Valentine, and Roxy Music, "on a subliminal level".

=== Lotus Plaza ===
His debut album as Lotus Plaza, The Floodlight Collective, was released on March 23, 2009 on Chicago-based label Kranky.

Spooky Action at a Distance, his second and most recent album as Lotus Plaza, was released on April 2, 2012, also on Kranky. At this point, the Lotus Plaza touring lineup was: T.J. Blake on bass, Frankie Broyles on drums, Allen Taylor on synth/electronics, Dan Wakefield on guitar, and Pundt on both lead vocals and guitar.

Pundt also has a side-project with his wife, Shayda Yavari, called Nice Weekend. They have released one track as part of an Audraglint split 10, called Come Back.

On March 24, 2014, Pundt released an EP, Overnight Motorcycle Music on the Geographic North label.

Pundt is scheduled to perform with Cox at the 2027 Big Ears Festival in Knoxville, Tennessee.

== Discography ==
With Deerhunter:

- 2007 Cryptograms/Fluorescent Grey EP
- 2008 Microcastle/Weird Era Cont.
- 2009 Rainwater Cassette Exchange EP
- 2010 Halcyon Digest
- 2013 Monomania
- 2015 Fading Frontier
- 2019 Why Hasn't Everything Already Disappeared?

As Lotus Plaza:

- 2009 The Floodlight Collective
- 2012 Spooky Action at a Distance
- 2014 Overnight Motorcycle Music EP

== See also ==
- List of ambient music artists
