= Rainwater Cassette Exchange =

EP by Deerhunter
- Released: May 18, 2009
- Recorded: February 2009
- Studios: Rare Book Room Studios, Brooklyn, New York
- Genres: Garage rock; indie rock; psychedelia
- Length: 15:18
- Labels: Kranky; 4AD
- Producer: Nicolas Vernhes

Deerhunter chronology
Weird Era Cont. (2008)	Rainwater Cassette Exchange (2009)	Halcyon Digest (2010)

Professional ratings
Aggregate scores
Source	Rating
Metacritic	(80/100)
Review scores
Source	Rating
AllMusic	4/5 stars
Clash	(8/10)
Drowned in Sound	(8/10)
Pitchfork	(7.5/10)

Rainwater Cassette Exchange is an extended-play by Atlanta-based indie rock band Deerhunter. Much like their previous effort, it was recorded at Rare Book Room Studios in Brooklyn with producer Nicolas Vernhes. It became available for download on May 18, 2009, and released on CD and vinyl on June 8. The EP was distributed by Kranky in the US while 4AD handled overseas distribution. The title track became available for download on April 17.

== Track listing ==
All songs by Bradford Cox unless otherwise noted.

1. "Rainwater Cassette Exchange" – 2:23
2. "Disappearing Ink" – 2:22 (Moses Archuleta/Bradford Cox/Josh Fauver/Lockett Pundt)
3. "Famous Last Words" – 2:15
4. "Game of Diamonds" – 3:14 (Bradford Cox/Josh Fauver)
5. "Circulation" – 5:04 (Moses Archuleta/Bradford Cox)

== Chart positions ==
Chart (2009)	Peak position
US Billboard Heatseekers	28
