= Cryptograms (album) =

Studio album by Deerhunter
- Released: January 29, 2007
- Recorded: 2005
- Genres: Art punk; shoegaze; ambient; psychedelic pop "ambient punk"
- Length: 48:24
- Label: Kranky
- Producer: Chris Bishop

Deerhunter chronology
Turn It Up Faggot (2005)	Cryptograms (2007)	Fluorescent Grey (2007)

Cryptograms is the second studio album from American indie rock group Deerhunter, released on CD and vinyl through Kranky on January 29, 2007. Following the 2005 release of their first full-length album Turn It Up Faggot, Deerhunter began recording material for their next record at Rare Book Room studio in New York. The initial recording session failed, due to the physical and mental state of lead singer Bradford Cox, as well as malfunctioning equipment in the studio. The band returned to Atlanta, only giving recording a second try after encouragement from members of the band Liars. The final version of Cryptograms was recorded in two separate day-long sessions, months apart, resulting in two musically distinct parts—the first includes more ambient music while the second contains more pop music elements. Cox sang most of the record's lyrics in a stream-of-consciousness manner; they include themes of death, companionship, and Cox's experiences with Marfan syndrome. Cryptograms was generally well received by critics, and several publications placed the album on their lists of the top albums of 2007.

== Recording ==
Deerhunter first attempted to record their second album in 2005 with folk musician Samara Lubelski at Rare Book Room studios in New York. The recording session failed, due in part to the physical and mental state of lead singer Bradford Cox, who had influenza and walking pneumonia at the time. The group was also working with malfunctioning equipment, including an out-of-tune piano and an uncalibrated tape recorder. Cox later described the results of these sessions as sounding like "if you listen to Loveless on mushrooms, and I mean that in not a complimentary way". In an interview with Pitchfork, Cox said that the music was "on a scratched CD-R under my bed", which "nobody will ever hear"; however, these tracks were later made available, in mixtape form, on the Deerhunter blog.

Following the failed session Deerhunter returned to Atlanta. The group became acquainted with punk band Liars, who encouraged them to give recording a second try. For their second attempt, Deerhunter returned to the same studio in which they had recorded their debut album Turn It Up Faggot. This attempt was successful, and the album was recorded in two parts: the first half was recorded over a single day-long session, completely filling the reel of tape the band had brought with them. The last song of this recording session, "Red Ink", ends with the tape audibly spinning off the reel. The second half, recorded in a similar day-long session held months later in November, begins with the song "Spring Hall Convert". During this recording session, Cox once again had the flu, and his congestion caused his voice to sound "really weird […] I always thought I would go back and redo them, but we never did".

Cryptograms was followed four months later by a four-track extended play, Fluorescent Grey, which was recorded while Cryptograms was being mixed. Cox indicated that each new track was worthy of being a single; one music critic characterized the EP as being less "dreamy" than Cryptograms. When Cryptograms was released on vinyl as a double album, the tracks from Fluorescent Grey took up the fourth side.

== Music and lyrics ==
"Spring Hall Convert"
The seventh track from Deerhunter's Cryptograms. The song's lyrics relate to Cox's hospitalization as a teenager, due to his Marfan syndrome.

According to Cox, Cryptograms is more "subdued and introverted" musically than Deerhunter's first release, Turn It Up Faggot. Cox has shown disdain for that record in interviews, saying it "sounds like 2002—angry, post-hardcore dance punk. We were really young and angry". While Cox does not consider Cryptograms a "reaction" to its predecessor, he noted in an interview with Stylus Magazine that it had "developed out of different circumstances, altogether".

The two recording sessions for the album produced two stylistically distinct parts. The first half of the album is more ambient in style and includes four instrumental ambient tracks. With the song "Providence", the band aimed to create a feeling of solitude; the idea for the song came about when, while in Providence, Rhode Island during a 2005 tour, Cox had an argument with the other members of the band. Having left his bandmates to cool off by himself, Cox "walked around Providence at dusk" feeling "totally alone", while admiring his "meditative" surroundings. For the instrumental track "Red Ink", Cox and drummer Moses Archuleta worked to create an atmosphere in which the listener is dreaming that they are dead and that the experience of death feels like reality.

The second part of the album, which begins with "Spring Hall Convert", contains more elements of psychedelia and pop music. In an interview with L.A. Record, Archuleta remarked that the band often received letters from fans who had listened to their music while stoned. He noted the negative connotations that come with being called a "psychedelic" band, and considered the group to be "pretty clean…[and] sober" in contrast, adding, "That’s funny that that’s people’s idea of what we’re into". "Spring Hall Convert" originates from a demo that Cox first recorded in October 1998, when he was 16. In discussing the origins of the song on the Deerhunter blog, Cox wrote of two girls he knew from his school as one day being "bathed in this golden spring light in the hallway". He described himself feeling close to them, as if they were his sisters. Cox originally recorded "Spring Hall Convert" on a karaoke machine on the same day as the experience; he wanted the song to reflect the "acid trip" he had experienced seeing his friends in this light. He calls the song's drum track characteristic of his "stonedness" at the time, adding that "Hydrocodone was [also] a factor". The lyrics of the track additionally touch on Cox's experiences with Marfan syndrome, which he underwent "extensive" surgeries on his chest, ribs, and back for as a teenager. Parts of the lyrics reflect the experience of someone moving in and out of consciousness during chemotherapy, while missing their friends and memories of a normal life. The original lyrics of the song, written in 1998, were not changed when the track was re-recorded for Cryptograms.

On "Octet", Cox sings "I was the corpse that spiraled out into phantom hallways". The imagery of this song was inspired by the cover art of the Grove paperback edition of the Dennis Cooper novel Closer. On the album’s closing track, "Heatherwood", Cox sings of the house he was born in, where he believes he will return to die. "Strange Lights" is a song about "companionship, and facing uncertainty with someone". The song was written by guitarist Lockett Pundt, and is based on a dream he had in which himself, Cox, and an unnamed third person "walked into the sun together, knowing it was going to kill us", as described by Cox. The idea for the song "Lake Somerset" came from a trip Cox took to the zoo while hung over, during which he saw a turtle eating carrots. "It was cool and adorable… It had this cute neck and was very small. It chewed slowly". When video producer James Sumner approached the band to make a music video for "Lake Somerset", Cox told Sumner he "wanted a video of a turtle eating a piece of pizza". Several days later, Sumner posted his video for the song to YouTube; it consists of a man in a turtle suit eating pizza for four minutes. Cox has said that the band's greatest achievement with Cryptograms was "evoking a feeling of someone who's woken up after being strung out one too many nights… It's the feeling of being lovesick and very spaced-out".

== Reception ==
Professional ratings
Aggregate scores
Source	Rating
Metacritic	77/100
Review scores
Source	Rating
AllMusic	3/5 stars
The Boston Phoenix	3.5/4 stars
Drowned in Sound	8/10
Paste	4/5 stars
Pitchfork	8.9/10
PopMatters	6/10
Spin	3/5 stars
Stylus Magazine	B
Tiny Mix Tapes	4.5/5 stars
Uncut	3/5 stars

Cryptograms received positive reviews from music critics. At Metacritic, which assigns a normalized rating out of 100 to reviews from mainstream critics, the album received an average score of 77, based on 17 reviews, indicating "generally favorable reviews".

Pitchfork awarded the album the publication's "Best New Music" accolade, and later placed it fourteenth on a list of the fifty best albums of 2007. Pitchfork staff writer Marc Hogan wrote that Cryptograms "is alternately murky...ethereal, amorphous and incisive", calling the second half of the album "vastly more accessible" than the first. Mike Diver of Drowned in Sound found the album's two halves "absolutely coherent; the sequencing allows the listener space to breathe at the most opportune moments, and its leaps from ambiance into adrenaline-soaked enthusiasm...are worthy of celebration". Tiny Mix Tapes's Paul Haney enjoyed the "psych-crazed pop" found in the second half of Cryptograms, citing "Spring Hall Convert", "Heatherwood", and "Strange Lights" as exemplary tracks. Nick Sylvester of The Boston Phoenix considered the first half of the album to be irregular in style and quality, but found that this gave the transition between its two halves "a black-and-white-to-Technicolor moment (or TV to HDTV, if you prefer): 'Spring Hall Convert' combines Deerhunter's come-up and come-down into the most uplifting rock song I've heard in a while, an explosion of gritty Velvet downstrums and swirling vocal harmonies".

The first half of Cryptograms was called "the problem child" by Kevin Elliott of Stylus Magazine, characterizing this child as having been "medicated at a young age to subdue constant anxiety and the fear of death, overly mired in thoughts of regret and anguish, overwhelmed with ideas and insight". Mike Schiller of PopMatters found that because the second half of Cryptograms "fixate[s] on examples of Deerhunter's songcraft, which is actually somewhat average", the use of delay effects "mask[s] whatever deficiencies in musicianship Deerhunter might choose to hide". He believes the potential seen in the first half of the album is lost in the second. AllMusic writer Marisa Brown felt the band's ambient music is used to the extent that it becomes "commonplace, despite its avant-garde leanings". Brown found that when the band "aims for the provocative and the esoteric", they often "overreach and end up hitting something much more ordinary, predictably 'experimental'… in a genre that's supposed to be anything but". Dom Sinacola of Cokemachineglow stated that Cryptograms "sounds, as a whole, too coherently cold", with the tracks "Providence" and "Heatherwood" being exceptions.

The album placed high on lists of the best albums of 2007 of several publications, earning spots in the top twenty with Tiny Mix Tapes, The Boston Phoenix and Drowned in Sound. An article by Pitchfork gave musicians the opportunity to publicize their favorite records from 2007. Cryptograms received praise from Ed Droste of Grizzly Bear, ranking the album as his third favorite of 2007. Klaxons' James Righton and Black Lips' Cole Alexander also placed the album on their own top ten lists for the year.

== Track listing ==
All lyrics are written by Cox; all music is composed by Moses Archuleta, Bradford Cox, Josh Fauver, Colin Mee and Lockett Pundt, except where noted

No.	Title	Music	Length
1.	"Intro"	Archuleta; Cox; Fauver; Pundt	2:50
2.	"Cryptograms"		4:17
3.	"White Ink"		4:59
4.	"Lake Somerset"	Cox	3:49
5.	"Providence"	Cox	4:08
6.	"Octet"		7:50
7.	"Red Ink"	Archuleta; Cox	3:40
8.	"Spring Hall Convert"	Cox	4:29
9.	"Strange Lights"	Cox; Pundt	3:38
10.	"Hazel St."		3:48
11.	"Tape Hiss Orchid"	Archuleta	1:12
12.	"Heatherwood"	Archuleta; Cox; Fauver; Pundt	3:37

== Personnel ==
Credits are adapted from the album's liner notes.

Deerhunter

- Bradford Cox – photography, vocals (1–4, 6–10, 12), electronics (1, 2, 4, 6), tape (1, 2, 5), piano (3, 5), drum programming (4), acoustic slide guitar (5), bell set (6, 7), accordion (7), guitar (8–10, 12)
- Moses Archuleta – synthesizer (1, 3, 5, 6, 11, 12) drums (2, 4, 6, 8–10, 12), electronics (2), treatments (7), vocals (12)
- Lockett Pundt – synth bells (2), guitar (3, 4, 8–10, 12), acoustic slide guitar (5), Hammond organ (5), vocals (12)
- Josh Fauver – tremolo bass (1), bass (2–4, 6, 8–10, 12), reverse guitar (5), vocals (12)
- Colin Mee – guitar (2, 4, 8–10), tape (3), electric guitar (6)

Production

- Susan Archie – layout
- Chris Bishop – production, engineering
- Jennifer Munson – mastering
- Nicolas Vernhes – mixing
