= Turn It Up Faggot =

Studio album by Deerhunter
- Released: June 28, 2005
- Recorded: July 27–28, 2004 at Radium Studios
- Genre: Post-punk revival; noise rock; dance-punk
- Length: 30:31
- Label: Stickfigure

Deerhunter chronology
Turn It Up Faggot (2005)	Cryptograms (2007)

Professional ratings
Review scores
Source	Rating
AllMusic	3.5/5 stars

Turn It Up Faggot is the debut studio album from indie rock group Deerhunter. The album's title refers to a taunt that was shouted at the band during early live shows although the album is also referred to as self-titled. The album's notes dedicate the album to Justin Bosworth, the band's second bassist, who died in 2004.

Lead singer Bradford Cox produced the cover photography, typography and montage for the album. For the album artwork, Cox took a picture of Jared Swilley from the Black Lips, recognizable to some because of the tattoo on his arm.

== Track listing ==
All tracks are written by Bradford Cox, Moses Archuleta, Josh Fauver, Colin Mee

No.	Title	Length
1.	"N. Animals"	2:34
2.	"Adorno"	4:36
3.	"Tech School"	2:29
4.	"Ponds"	2:50
5.	"Language/Violence"	2:36
6.	"Oceans"	3:47
7.	"Basement"	2:59
8.	"Young Layer"	2:19
9.	"Death Drag"	6:16

== Personnel ==
Deerhunter

- Bradford Cox – guitar, vocals, tapes, piano (2, 6)
- Moses Archuleta – drums, percussion
- Josh Fauver – bass, piano (2), percussion
- Colin Mee – electric guitar, acoustic guitar, percussion

Production

- Chris Bishop – recording, mixing
- Julie Ellidge – front cover concept
- Tommy Chung – photography

== Music videos ==
Screenshot	Title/Description
	"Oceans"
Although the song was never released as a single, a video was made for the track "Oceans". The video is directed by Shana Wood and features a montage of images from crashing waves to sea creatures such as the jelly fish which appear at left. The band themselves make no appearance.
