= Weird Era Cont. =

Studio album by Deerhunter
- Released: October 28, 2008
- Recorded: 2007–2008
- Genres: Shoegaze; post-punk; noise pop
- Length: 41:59
- Labels: Kranky; 4AD
- Producer: Deerhunter

Deerhunter chronology
Microcastle (2008)	Weird Era Cont. (2008)	Rainwater Cassette Exchange (2009)

Professional ratings
Review scores
Source	Rating
AllMusic	3.5/5 stars
The Guardian	4/5 stars
Pitchfork	9.2/10
Sputnikmusic	4/5 stars
Tiny Mix Tapes	5/5 stars

Weird Era Cont. is the fourth studio album by Deerhunter released concurrently with Microcastle. After Microcastle had leaked months in advance of its planned release date, the band recorded a new album in an attempt to reward those who awaited its street release date although like Microcastle, it also leaked in advance. Weird Era Cont. was officially made available as a bonus disc/12", depending on format, with both the 4AD and Kranky releases.

The album is unique in the Deerhunter canon in that it includes songs composed and performed entirely by singular members of the band, outside what would normally be Atlas Sound or Lotus Plaza. The majority of the album was recorded by the band themselves, with a portion of the album recorded in a studio. In terms of the production of the record, guitarist Lockett Pundt stated: "We kind of wanted it to have an old and haunted vibe in regard to the production of the songs. Probably not something that we would do again."

== Leak controversy ==
On August 18, 2008, Bradford Cox made a post on the Deerhunter blog, linking readers to download "Holiday" b/w "S.S.C." as part of the Virtual 7" series (a series of digital singles released by Cox as Atlas Sound on the Deerhunter blog) without realizing his entire MediaFire account could have been accessed from that link. At the time, the folder contained unmastered demos of Weird Era Cont. and the Atlas Sound album Logos. Someone later gained access to these folders and proceeded to upload them onto P2P networks.

This later sparked an outrage by Cox, who intended Weird Era Cont. to be a surprise to those purchasing the album on its street release date. In the blog, Cox expressed his distaste towards the leaks and whoever made them available, commenting: "[Weird Era Cont.] was supposed to be a surprise and actually make the idea of an 'Album Release Date' fun." Cox later apologized for his response stating "I accept my mistake. I apologize for my reaction. My anger was directed at myself. Sorry for projecting."

== Track listing ==
No.	Title	Length
1.	"Backspace Century"	2:19
2.	"Operation"	4:04
3.	"Ghost Outfit"	0:33
4.	"Dot Gain"	3:19
5.	"Vox Celeste"	3:31
6.	"Cicadas"	2:30
7.	"Vox Humana"	2:32
8.	"VHS Dream"	2:33
9.	"Focus Group"	2:49
10.	"Slow Swords"	3:25
11.	"Weird Era"	2:40
12.	"Moon Witch Cartridge"	1:32
13.	"Calvary Scars II/Aux. Out"	10:12
Total length:		41:59

== Personnel ==
- Bradford J. Cox – voice, guitar, keyboards
- Joshua Fauver – bass
- Lockett Pundt – guitar, voice
- Moses Archuleta – drums

Additional musicians

- Drew Vandenberg – guitar and piano on 1, percussion on 1 and 13
- David Barbe – guitar on 1, wurlitzer on 11, percussion on 1 and 13
