= Microcastle =

Studio album by Deerhunter
- Released: August 19, 2008
- Recorded: April 2008, at Rare Book Room Studios, New York
- Genres: Shoegaze; indie pop; baroque pop
- Length: 40:53
- Labels: Kranky; 4AD
- Producer: Nicolas Vernhes

Deerhunter chronology
Fluorescent Grey (EP) (2007)	Microcastle (2008)	Weird Era Cont. (2008)

Singles from Microcastle
- 1. "Nothing Ever Happened" Released: October 14, 2008

Alternative cover

Microcastle is the third studio album by Deerhunter. After the album had been leaked on the internet, it became available on iTunes on August 19, 2008, while physical copies were released on October 27, 2008. In the U.S. the album was released on Kranky and on 4AD in Europe. The album was recorded over the course of one week in April 2008 by Nicolas Vernhes at Rare Book Room Studios in Brooklyn, NY. In the U.S., the album has managed to sell over 50,000 units.

Unlike Cryptograms, the band decided to forgo heavy utilization of effects pedals. Throughout the recording of the record, only a number of drum tracks and the vocals on "Agoraphobia" were treated. Of the musical direction of the new material, Bradford Cox has said "I'm more interested in the micro-structure. I want things to be a lot shorter, I don't want there to be as much long-windedness to it." The band premiered the album live at Brooklyn's Market Hotel on April 11, 2008. A bonus disc, Weird Era Cont., was released concurrently with the album.

"Saved By Old Times" features an appearance by Cole Alexander of the Black Lips. His appearance was recorded over an iChat session.

== Vinyl versions ==
The original pressing of the vinyl on Kranky was one white vinyl LP, had a single panel jacket with different artwork than the CD (see alternate artwork), and came with Weird Era Cont. on CD in its own paper sleeve. Since the album has gained popularity, there has been another pressing, with both parts of the album being pressed on black vinyl in a gatefold jacket with the orange artwork originally used for the CD.

== Reception ==
Professional ratings
Aggregate scores
Source	Rating
AnyDecentMusic?	8.3/10
Metacritic	81/100
Review scores
Source	Rating
AllMusic	4.5/5 stars
The A.V. Club	A−
Entertainment Weekly	B+
The Guardian	4/5 stars
Los Angeles Times	3/4 stars
Mojo	4/5 stars
Pitchfork	9.2/10
Q	3/5 stars
Rolling Stone	3.5/5 stars
Spin	4/5 stars

Microcastle has been met with much acclaim since its release, currently holding an 81 rating on Metacritic, from a weighted average of 35 professional critics, indicating "Universal Acclaim". Both Tiny Mix Tapes and Sputnikmusic awarded the album with a perfect score. Spin, Billboard, The New York Times and The Guardian all gave the album an 8/10. Rolling Stone rewarded the album a 3.5 score, and RS contributor, Daniel Kreps listed Microcastle/Weird Era Cont. as his favorite album of 2008. Pitchfork also rated the album highly, naming the album 50th best record of the decade and 5th best of the year, along with awarding it with a 9.2 upon initial review. Pitchfork also named “Nothing Ever Happened” the 6th best song of the year and 81st best song of the decade. Hype Machine rated the album as 11th best of the year.

In October 2025, Paste ranked the album at number 245 on their "250 Greatest Albums of the 21st Century So Far" list, writing: "In those days, the sight of the unconventionally handsome Cox as a conventional rock frontman was exhilarating, affirming stuff. And though Microcastle is hardly straightforward, it was an aggressive step toward the mainstream that sacrificed none of Deerhunter’s woozy adventurousness."

== Track listing ==
All lyrics are written by Bradford Cox, except "Neither of Us, Uncertainly" by Lockett Pundt; all music is composed by Bradford Cox, except where noted.

No.	Title	Music	Length
1.	"Cover Me (Slowly)" (instrumental)	Bradford Cox; Lockett Pundt	1:21
2.	"Agoraphobia"	Pundt	3:22
3.	"Never Stops"		3:04
4.	"Little Kids"	Cox; Pundt	4:22
5.	"Microcastle"		3:40
6.	"Calvary Scars"		1:37
7.	"Green Jacket"		2:09
8.	"Activa"		1:49
9.	"Nothing Ever Happened"	Moses Archuleta; Cox; Josh Fauver; Pundt	5:50
10.	"Saved by Old Times"		3:50
11.	"Neither of Us, Uncertainly"	Pundt	5:25
12.	"Twilight at Carbon Lake"		4:24
Total length:			40:53

- Tracks 6–8 are part of a suite

== Personnel ==
Deerhunter

- Moses Archuleta – drums
- Bradford J. Cox – guitar, keyboards, vocals
- Joshua Fauver – bass
- Lockett Pundt – guitar, vocals on "Agoraphobia" & "Neither of Us, Uncertainly"

Additional musicians

- Cole Alexander – vocal montage on "Saved By Old Times"
- Nicolas Vernhes – SK-1 on "Agoraphobia"

Technical staff

- Joe Lambert – mastering
- Nicolas Vernhes – producer, engineer

== Charts ==
Chart (2008)	Peak position
US Billboard 200	123
US Billboard Heatseekers	1
US Billboard Independent Albums	14
US Billboard Tastemaker Albums	10
