= Halcyon Digest =

2010 studio album by Deerhunter

Studio album by Deerhunter
- Released: September 27, 2010
- Recorded: June 2010
- Studios: Chase Park Transduction, Athens, Georgia; Notown Sound, Marietta, Georgia
- Genres: Psychedelic pop; dream pop; indie pop; noise pop
- Length: 45:50
- Label: 4AD
- Producers: Deerhunter; Ben H. Allen; Henry Barbe

Deerhunter chronology
Rainwater Cassette Exchange (2009)	Halcyon Digest (2010)	Monomania (2013)

Singles from Halcyon Digest
- 1. "Revival" Released: July 21, 2010; 2. "Memory Boy" Released: April 16, 2011

Halcyon Digest is the fifth studio album by American indie rock band Deerhunter. It was released September 27, 2010, to universal critical acclaim. It was the band's first album distributed solely by 4AD worldwide (previously 4AD only handled overseas distribution while Kranky handled it within the U.S.) The album was produced by the band and Ben H. Allen, and was recorded at Chase Park Transduction studios in Athens, Georgia with engineer David Barbe. The final track, "He Would Have Laughed" was recorded separately by Bradford Cox at Notown Sound in Marietta, Georgia and is a tribute to Jay Reatard.

It is the band's last album to feature bass guitarist Josh Fauver.

== Concept ==
Writing on his Facebook profile page, Cox stated "The album's title is a reference to a collection of fond memories and even invented ones, like my friendship with Ricky Wilson or the fact that I live in an abandoned victorian autoharp factory. The way that we write and rewrite and edit our memories to be a digest version of what we want to remember, and how that's kind of sad."

Answering the Q question as to whether the album was "...supposed to sound like a newsletter or bulletin board from somewhere mysterious", Bradford Cox said: "It's supposed to be like a collection of short dispatches". He called the use of the word 'Halcyon' misleading, adding: "It has a lot to do with the way people romanticize the past, even if it was horrific."

The album artwork was provided by renowned Atlanta photographer George Mitchell. Deerhunter drummer, Moses Archuleta, initially suggested a "stark black and white theme" with Cox ultimately selecting Mitchell's photograph because "it had an immediate connection to the music, especially songs like 'Basement Scene'."

The picture portrays Dennis Dinion, a contestant in The Miss Star Lite Pageant at the Star Lite Lounge on Ponce de Leon Avenue in Atlanta, Georgia. It was shot by Mitchell on New Year's Eve, December 31, 1982, the last night the Star Lite was open. Dennis Dinion worked as a substitute teacher in the Atlanta Public Schools. Bradford Cox described the artwork during an Instagram live on October 31, 2018, saying that a book fell off the shelf and opened to this page and he felt it was fate. It was a photo book of the Ponce de Leon area in Atlanta. Cox spent time in his childhood near the Star Lite Lounge; he was just a few months old the night of the Miss Star Lite Pageant.

== Promotion ==
To help promote the release of the LP, the group launched a new website where they urged fans to download a promotional flyer (created by Cox by photocopying images together) and email pictures of it "hanging in your town, neighborhood, bedrooms, etc." To reward those who had emailed photos, the band revealed the track listing and album artwork via email. The first single, "Revival," along with some unused demos and b-side "Primitive 3D" were also made available to fans who had posted flyers. "Helicopter" was later released as a single with a video available on September 8.

About the flyer concept, Cox stated he was inspired by the record promotion he witnessed in the 80s. He recalls:

...always being fascinated with the ephemera of 70's – 80's artrock in record stores like Wuxtry in Athens where I hung out as a kid or Wax 'N Facts in Atlanta. You'd see a photocopied faded B-52's flyer next to a poster for Lou Reed or XTC. It was like an artpunk scrapbook on those walls. It made my head spin. Who are these people? Who are the fucking Residents with these weird-ass eyeball faces?

== Reception ==
Professional ratings
Aggregate scores
Source	Rating
AnyDecentMusic?	8.1/10
Metacritic	86/100
Review scores
Source	Rating
AllMusic	5/5 stars
The A.V. Club	A−
The Guardian	4/5 stars
Mojo	4/5 stars
MSN Music (Expert Witness)	A−
NME	8/10
Pitchfork	9.2/10
Q	4/5 stars
Rolling Stone	3.5/5 stars
Spin	8/10

Halcyon Digest received widespread acclaim. At Metacritic, which assigns a normalized rating out of 100 to reviews from mainstream critics, the album received an average score of 86, based on 33 reviews, indicating "Universal Acclaim". It ranked second in Exclaim!'s Pop & Rock Albums of the Year where Cam Lindsay credits Deerhunter with continuing their "impressive streak as one of the more consistent sonic explorer's [sic] within the indie rock canon." The album also appeared at No. 3 on Pitchfork's 50 Greatest Albums of 2010, where Rob Mitchum writes that the work's rough-yet-shimmery production and existential theme "demonstrates that the ache of mortality can be even more wounding in the bright glare of daytime than late at night."

The album was also included in the 2010 edition of the book 1001 Albums You Must Hear Before You Die.

The album was ranked the 3rd best album from 2010-2014, and 29th best in the 2010s in lists published by Pitchfork.

== Track listing ==
All tracks are written by Bradford Cox, except where noted.

No.	Title	Writer(s)	Length
1.	"Earthquake"		5:00
2.	"Don't Cry"		2:49
3.	"Revival"		2:13
4.	"Sailing"		4:59
5.	"Memory Boy"		2:09
6.	"Desire Lines"	Lockett Pundt	6:44
7.	"Basement Scene"		3:41
8.	"Helicopter"		4:58
9.	"Fountain Stairs"	Pundt	2:38
10.	"Coronado"		3:19
11.	"He Would Have Laughed"		7:29
Total length:			45:50

Japanese bonus tracks
No.	Title	Length
12.	"Rhythm"	2:56
13.	"Colorscale"	5:10
Total length:		53:56

== Personnel ==
Credits adapted from AllMusic and album liner notes.

Deerhunter

- Moses Archuleta – drums
- Bradford J. Cox – lead vocals, guitar
- Joshua Fauver – bass
- Lockett Pundt – guitar, lead vocals (6, 9)

Additional musicians

- Bill Oglesby – saxophone (9 and 10)
- Paul McPherson – 12 string guitar (10)

Recording personnel

- Ben H. Allen – producer, mixing, overdubs, additional production (11)
- Deerhunter – producer
- David Barbe – engineer, mixing (7)
- Drew Vandenberg – assistant engineer
- Rocbert Gardner – mixing assistant
- Henry Barbe – producer and engineer (7)
- Winston Barbe – assistant engineer (7), intern
- David Barbe – mixing (7)
- Bradford Cox – recording (11)
- Joe Lambert – mastering
- Yousuf Ahmed – intern
- Matt Tuttle – intern
- Paul McPherson – assistant to the band

Artwork

- George Mitchell – cover photo, photography
- Dennis Dinion – model
- Bradford Cox – typography, layout, design, additional artwork
- Will Govus – inside photo
- Deerhunter – photography
- Dan Gallo – layout assistance

== Chart positions ==
Chart (2010)	Peak position
Belgian Albums (Ultratop Flanders)	73
Belgian Heatseekers Albums (Ultratop Flanders)	19
Belgian Albums (Ultratop Wallonia)	93
Belgian Heatseekers Albums (Ultratop Wallonia)	9
Dutch Albums (Album Top 100)	99
Dutch Alternative Albums (Mega Alternative Top 30)	5
French Albums (SNEP)	156
Japanese Albums (Oricon)	84
Norwegian Albums (VG-lista)	23
UK Albums (OCC)	79
UK Independent Albums (Official Charts)	8
US Billboard 200	37
US Independent Albums (Billboard)	7
US Top Rock Albums (Billboard)	13

As of 2011 it has sold 59,879 copies in United States according to Nielsen SoundScan.
