= Deerhunter =

American rock band

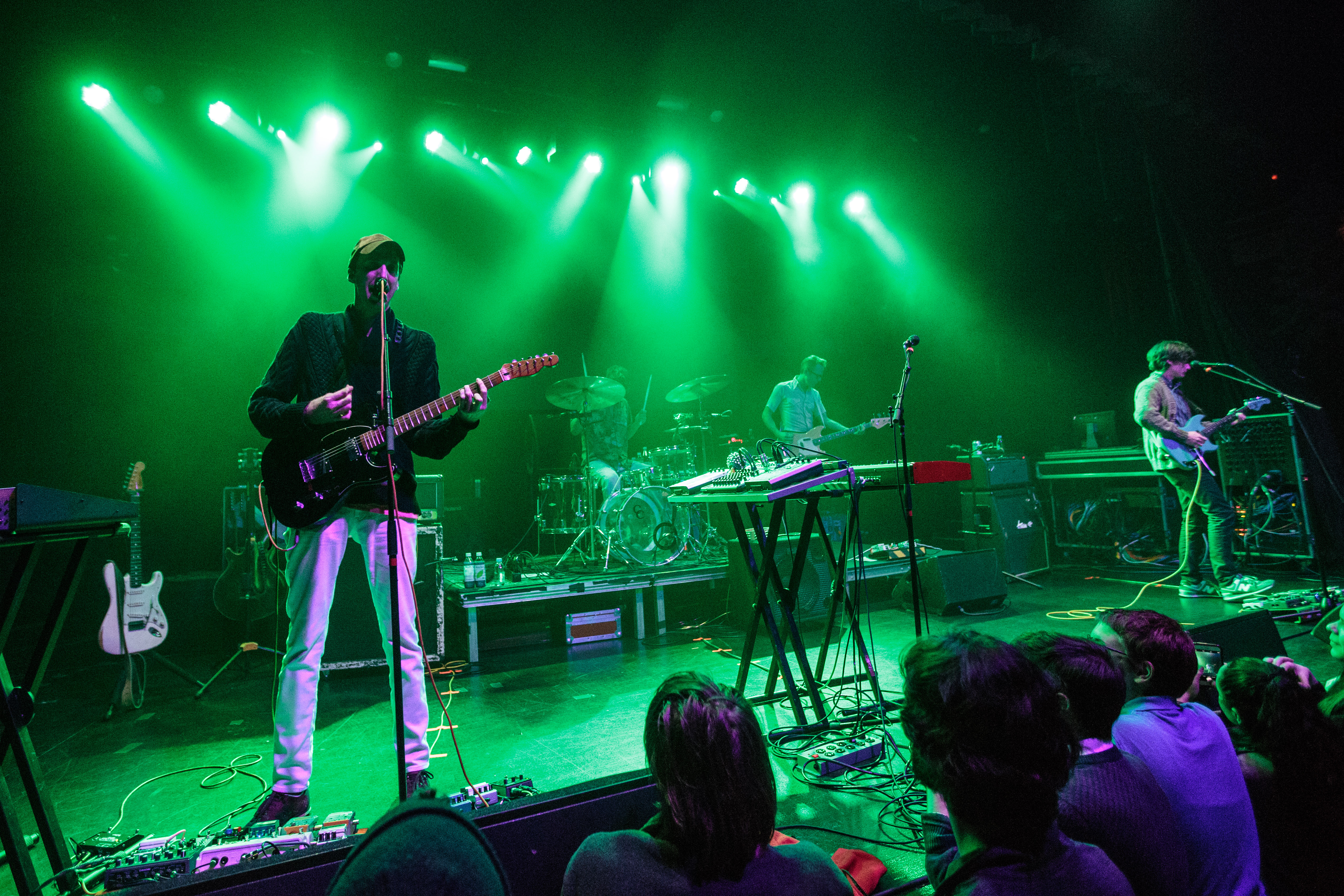
- Deerhunter performing in 2015. Left to right: Bradford Cox, Moses Archuleta, Josh McKay, Lockett Pundt.

Background information
- Origin: Atlanta, Georgia, U.S.
- Genres: Indie rock; experimental rock; psychedelic pop; noise rock; garage rock; art rock; shoegaze
- Years active: 2001–2019 (on hiatus)
- Labels: 4AD; Kranky; Stickfigure
- Members: Bradford Cox; Lockett Pundt; Moses Archuleta; Josh McKay; Javier Morales
- Past members: Dan Walton; Paul Harper; Justin Bosworth; Colin Mee; Adam Bruneau; Whitney Petty; Josh Fauver; Frankie Broyles; Rhasaan Manning
- Website: deerhuntermusic.com

Deerhunter is an American indie rock band from Atlanta, Georgia, that was formed in 2001 by vocalist-guitarist Bradford Cox and drummer Moses Archuleta. Its most recent lineup comprised Cox, Archuleta, guitarist-keyboardist Lockett Pundt, bassist Josh McKay, and keyboardist-saxophonist Javier Morales. Deerhunter have described themselves as "ambient punk," though they incorporate a wide range of genres, including noise, garage rock, art rock, as well as significant pop elements.

Founded by Cox, Archuleta and bass guitarist Paul Harper, Deerhunter's first stable line-up featured guitarist Colin Mee and Harper's replacement Justin Bosworth. After recording a split EP with Alphabets, Bosworth died aged 24 on March 29, 2004, of head injuries suffered during a skateboarding accident. The band recorded their first studio album, Turn It Up Faggot (2005), with Josh Fauver occupying the vacant role of bass guitarist. Following the album's release, Cox asked childhood friend, Lockett Pundt, to join Deerhunter as a song-writing partner, second guitarist, and occasional lead vocalist.

Recorded in two days, the band's follow-up, Cryptograms (2007), combined ambient work and more angular garage rock songs. The release was quickly followed by the EP, Fluorescent Grey (2007). While touring the releases, Mee departed from Deerhunter, due to disagreements over the band's schedule, but rejoined soon after. Deerhunter then released two studio albums, Microcastle (2008) and Weird Era Cont. (2008). Both albums were recorded without the participation of Mee, who again departed for a second and final time. The band enlisted former cheerleader and high school friend of Cox, Whitney Petty, as his touring replacement.

Recorded as a four-piece alongside producer Ben H. Allen, the band's fourth studio album Halcyon Digest (2010) was released to widespread critical acclaim and was ranked as Pitchfork's 29th and Stereogum's 78th best album of the decade. In 2012, the departure of long-time bassist Fauver placed the band's future in doubt. Cox, Pundt and Archuleta regrouped with new members, bassist Josh McKay and guitarist Frankie Broyles, to record the primitivist garage rock and musique concrète-influenced Monomania (2013). The album expanded on a darker and more disturbing sound, complete with treated tape recordings of rats and insects, exploring themes of disassociation and mental illness.

The following year, Cox was struck by a vehicle while walking his dog near his home in Atlanta's Grant Park. During his recovery and rehabilitation he focused on writing songs resulting in the album Fading Frontier (2015). Several years later, the band released its most recent album, Why Hasn't Everything Already Disappeared? (2019), which was produced by Cate Le Bon. The band has been on an extended hiatus since finishing the album's accompanying tour in late 2019.

== History ==
=== 2001–2005: Formation and Turn It Up Faggot ===
The band was co-founded in 2001 by vocalist Bradford Cox, drummer and keyboardist Moses Archuleta and bassist Paul Harper. The name Deerhunter, which Cox has repeatedly disparaged, was chosen by the band's first drummer, Dan Walton. At the time, Cox didn't care for the band's name, thinking it to be just another temporary art project. Colin Mee, whom Cox met while Mee was living at the Atlanta-based label Die Slaughterhaus Records with members of Black Lips, soon joined the band. The two bonded over a shared interest in Dada, the 20th century composers Olivier Messiaen and György Ligeti, and the British bands The Fall, The Raincoats, and Cabaret Voltaire. In 2004 the group's second bassist, Justin Bosworth, died of head injuries suffered in a skateboarding accident aged 24. He appeared on only one Deerhunter release, the Deerhunter/Alphabets Split, released before their debut album. Joshua Fauver, of Atlanta-based punk band Electrosleep International, then took up the position as bassist.

Deerhunter's first album, Turn It Up Faggot, released on June 28, 2005, and was "the result of a lot of negativity". After the band finished the album, in an indication of how difficult it was to record in the wake of his bandmate's death, Cox said "I don't ever want to make this album again". The album's liner notes are dedicated to Bosworth. After the release of Turn It Up Faggot, Cox asked his friend Lockett Pundt to join the band. The two had been friends since meeting at Harrison High School, meeting through a mutual friend, with Pundt commenting in a 2009 interview, "I was summoned by this girl who was in a drama class of mine named Lauren. She told me that Brad wanted to meet me more or less... It was arranged to go down in the bus ports between class... And so we met in the bus port".

=== 2005–2007: Cryptograms and Fluorescent Grey EP ===
The band, now featuring Pundt's reverb-saturated guitar sound, went on tour, playing shows with Lightning Bolt and Gang Gang Dance. This tour culminated in a recording session engineered by Samara Lubelski at Rare Book Room in New York City. This session failed to produce anything that could be used due to Cox's mental and physical state at the time as well as technical disagreements that emerged with Lubelski. Cox has kept a copy of the sessions on "a scratched CD-R under my bed" and has stated that "nobody will ever hear them". In spite of Cox's claim, excerpts from those sessions were later posted as a free download on the band's blog. The band returned to the same studio where they recorded their first album outside Athens, Georgia and decided to give recording their second album another attempt. This was partly due to advice received from the band Liars, who encouraged them to re-record it.

It took only two days in November 2005 for the band to record their second album, entitled Cryptograms. In 2006, before its release, Pitchfork Media added "Spring Hall Convert", a song from the record, to its "Infinite Mix Tape series". The album was released by Kranky on January 29, 2007. The album revealed a more subdued and introverted sound for the band. As with their first album, Cryptograms also had a dedication inside the album's liner notes, this time to a friend of Cox's, Bradley Ira Harris, a heroin addict who died in 2005.

On May 8, 2007, the group released a four-track EP, Fluorescent Grey, which was recorded in July 2006. The EP featured more use of rudimentary keyboards, bells, and pianos. The album's cover features a posterized image of Pundt as a seventh-grader.

On August 29, 2007, the group became a quartet with the loss of guitarist Colin Mee. Mee departed because he "...couldn't make it to a couple of shows we had booked next weekend and that was unacceptable to certain bandmates". Mee rejoined the band four months later, but departed the band for the final time in 2008.

=== 2007–2009: Microcastle/Weird Era Cont. and Rainwater Cassette Exchange EP ===
Deerhunter contributed the song "After Class" to Living Bridge, a compilation put together by Rare Book Room Records. The song was recorded in the same place where they attempted to record their second album. They returned to Rare Book Room studios in April 2008 to record "Oh, It's Such A Shame", a Jay Reatard cover that would be released as a split single with Reatard himself covering the Fluorescent Grey title track. In the same month they recorded their next album. Prior to the announced release date for the LP, the band continued to tour, with one date opening for The Smashing Pumpkins and a select of fall shows opening for Nine Inch Nails.

The band's third album, Microcastle, was set to be released on October 27, 2008, though it leaked onto peer-to peer networks in late May. In an attempt to reward fans who had waited for the official date, the group reconvened to record a new album of material, Weird Era Cont., which also leaked before its official date. However, Microcastle managed to debut at No. 123 on the Billboard 200, a first for Deerhunter. Mee left the band again, for the final time, and the band enlisted former cheerleader and high school friend of Cox, Whitney Petty, as his touring replacement.

Whilst touring Microcastle in the United Kingdom, Cox booked an evening in a studio and recorded what would become the On Platts Eyott cassette. This was released in two batches of 100 copies each; an edition of pink cassettes was given out to competition winners by his record label and orange cassettes were sold at a special Halloween concert in Atlanta on October 31, 2008. In a comment left on the Deerhunter blog on February 28, Cox announced that Whitney Petty was no longer a member of the band stating, "We will be a four-piece again for now. Whitney is what you would call a 'free spirit'. She's also a great friend. Deerhunter is the four of us. We might have people come and go and that's just how we keep things interesting for ourselves".

While on tour, the band managed to release a five-track EP, Rainwater Cassette Exchange, on May 18, 2009, featuring songs written during the Microcastle sessions, as well as "Vox Celeste 5," a two-track single of songs from Weird Era Cont. and Microcastle released on Sub Pop Records. To promote the releases, they embarked on a short summer trek with No Age and Dan Deacon as the "No Deachunter Tour". Later during a performance at the 2009 edition of All Tomorrow's Parties Music Festival in September (curated by The Flaming Lips), Bradford Cox announced that the band will be going on hiatus to "devote time to some other things," calling the show their last "for a long time". During the hiatus, Bradford Cox continued with his solo Atlas Sound project and released his second album Logos on October 19, 2009, Josh Fauver resumed work with his record label Army of Bad Luck, Moses Archuleta enrolled in culinary school, and Lockett Pundt performed some shows in celebration of The Floodlight Collective, his debut album as Lotus Plaza released on March 23, 2009.

=== 2010–2012: Halcyon Digest ===
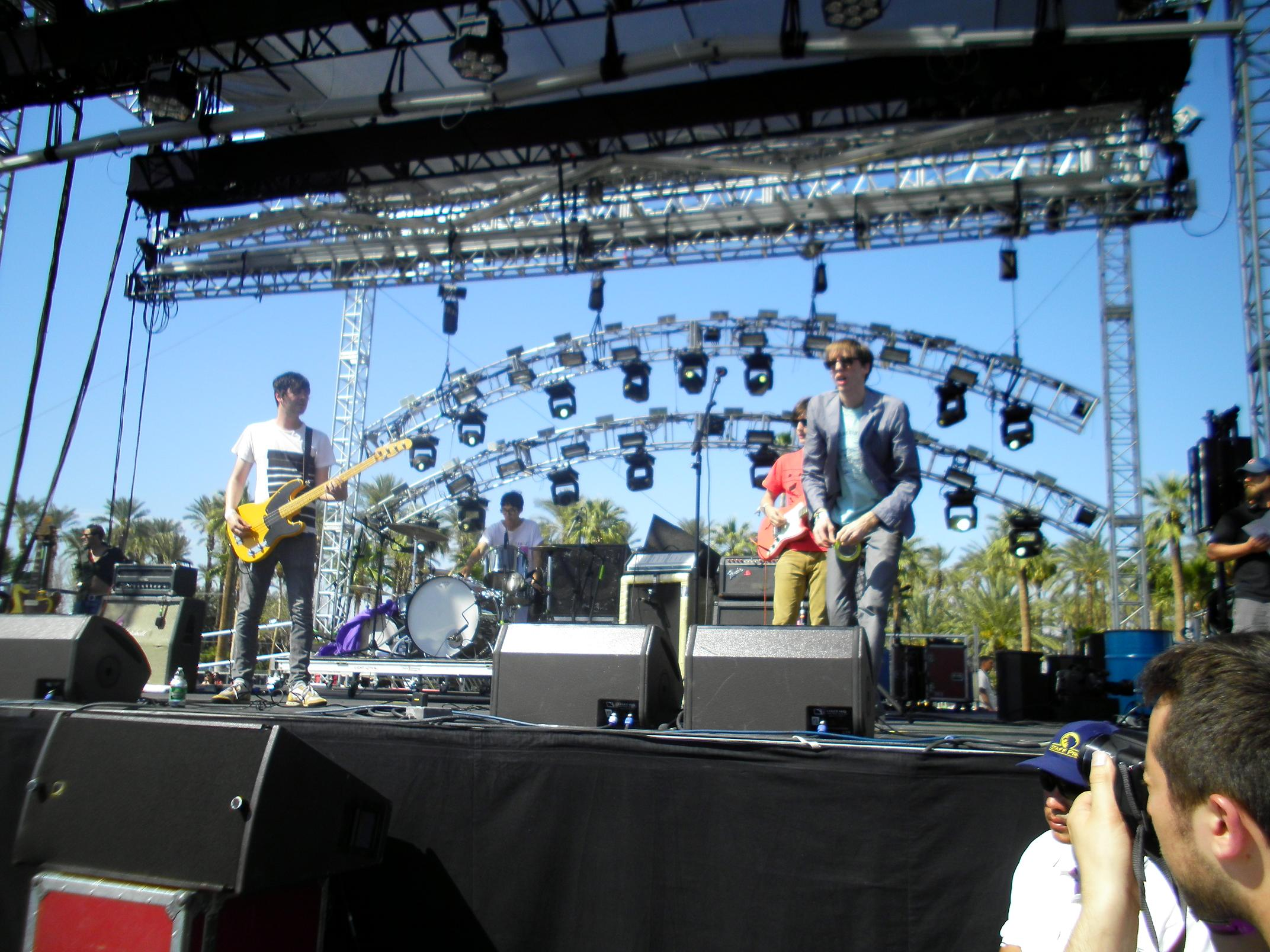
Deerhunter performing at the 2010 Coachella Festival

In early January 2010, it was revealed that the group would serve as openers on the upcoming Spoon tour to promote their album Transference. Along with the Spoon tour, the group also announced some shows of their own, including stops at the 2010 Coachella Valley Music and Arts Festival, and All Tomorrow's Parties (2010's edition was curated by Simpsons creator, Matt Groening). During these shows, the band began to debut some new material, including the songs "Revival", "Helicopter", "Primitive 3D", and "Fountain Stairs", all of which would end up being recorded for their next studio session to follow.

In June, Deerhunter took a short break from touring to record what would become their fifth album, Halcyon Digest. Initial news of the album became public when music industry firm, Milk Money, posted a message on their Twitter account that the band had been mixing the new record with Ben Allen (who also worked on Animal Collective's Merriweather Post Pavilion and Fall Be Kind EP). A week later, the band launched a new website, where they announced the title and release date of the LP, along with a guerilla style marketing campaign. The first single, "Revival," was made available to fans who had assisted the band with promotion for the new album through a link via official email. In the same month, director John Albrecht posted a trailer for an upcoming live video on his Vimeo page set to be released later in the year. Halcyon Digest was released on September 28, 2010, to critical acclaim: it received a five-star review from AllMusic, and was ranked the third-best album of the year by Pitchfork.

In 2012, it was announced that Deerhunter was to provide an original score to The Curve of Forgotten Things, a short film by the fashion line Rodarte starring Elle Fanning. That same year, bassist Josh Fauver left the band via email in 2012, just prior to the recording of the band's sixth album, Monomania.

=== 2013–2014: Monomania ===
On March 22, 2013, Deerhunter announced their sixth studio album would be released on May 7, 2013. The album, entitled Monomania, was recorded in New York City with frequent collaborator and producer Nicolas Vernhes at his Rare Book Room Studio, where Microcastle and Cox's third solo Atlas Sound album Parallax were recorded. For Monomania, Josh McKay took over bass duties, and Atlanta native Frankie Broyles was brought in to play guitar. Deerhunter's press release described the record as "nocturnal garage" while having an avant garde context. On April 2, 2013, the band performed the song "Monomania" on Late Night with Jimmy Fallon.

Deerhunter headlined and curated the All Tomorrow's Parties (2013's edition was curated by TV on the Radio) held in Camber Sands, England from June 21–23, 2013. At the event, they performed Cryptograms, Microcastle & Halcyon Digest in their entirety, with Cox also performing a set of their solo Atlas Sound material. Deerhunter also performed at Austin Psych Fest, Primavera Sound (Barcelona and Porto), Dancity Festival in Foligno, Italy, and Meredith Music Festival in Victoria, Australia.

On December 4, 2014, frontman Bradford Cox was seriously injured and hospitalized after being hit by a car in Atlanta, Georgia.

=== 2015–2017: Fading Frontier ===
On August 16, 2015, Deerhunter released a video for a new song titled "Snakeskin", and announced that their new album, Fading Frontier, was due to be released on October 16, 2015, on the British label 4AD. The song featured alto saxophonist Zumi Rosow of Black Lips and the video was directed by Valentina Tapia. On October 13, Deerhunter shared the video for "Living My Life", dedicated to Miles Davis. The LP was very well received by critics. In the same year, Deerhunter played at FYF Fest in Los Angeles.

=== 2018–2019: Double Dream of Spring and Why Hasn’t Everything Already Disappeared? ===
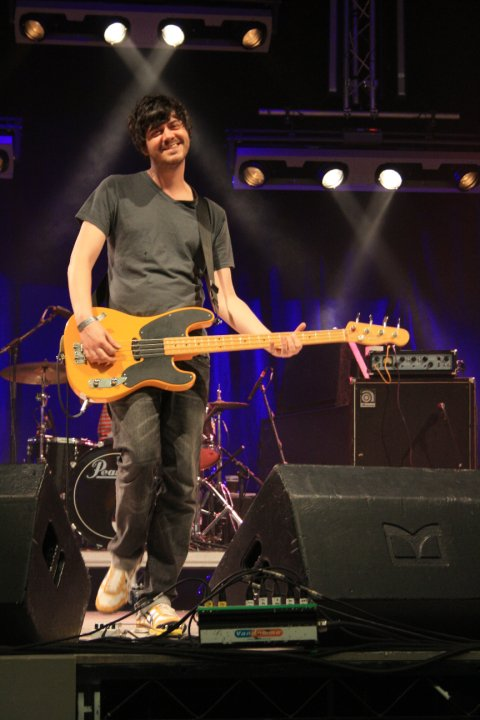
Josh Fauver, former bassist of Deerhunter, performing at an ATP Festival in 2010

In 2018, the band released a cassette-only studio album during their Spring 2018 tour called Double Dream of Spring. A mostly instrumental album, it was made to fill the void until the release of their next album the following year.

On November 2, 2018, Deerhunter announced on social media that former bass guitarist Josh Fauver had died unexpectedly in Atlanta, Georgia, aged 39. No cause of death was announced.

Deerhunter's eighth album, Why Hasn't Everything Already Disappeared?, was released on January 18, 2019. The album's first single, "Death in Midsummer", was released in October 2018 co-produced by Cate Le Bon. The band subsequently spent November 2019 on tour around Europe.

On Halloween 2019, Deerhunter released the 13-minute long single "Timebends". A separate entity to their eighth studio album, Why Hasn't Everything Already Disappeared?, "Timebends" is a partly-improvised stream-of-consciousness outpouring, recorded live direct to tape and in one take with minimal overdubs and mastered using a completely analog signal chain. The next day, Cox released the Myths 004 EP in collaboration with Cate Le Bon, recorded in Marfa, Texas as part of an ongoing series with Dev Hynes, Ariel Pink and Connan Mockasin.

The band has remained inactive since the end of their November 2019 tour.

== Musical style and influences ==
The band has cited many artists and genres that have influenced Deerhunter's sound. The New York Times concert review mentioned "the Breeders, Stereolab, disco rhythm, krautrock, Sonic Youth’s noise breakdowns, girl-group pop, the picked eighth-note bass lines of 1980s indie rock", as influences. The song "Coronado" from Halcyon Digest features saxophone sounds inspired by the Rolling Stones' album Exile on Main St. Cox recalled, "I wanted that sax on there because I was listening to the Stones' Exile on Main St reissue a lot...I began to see a pattern forming. Saxophones are becoming this thing. That's why we did it early. Next year everyone's gonna have a saxophone on their record because saxophones are just cool."

Deerhunter has been described as indie rock, experimental rock, psychedelic pop, noise rock, garage rock and art rock.

== Members ==
Current

- Bradford Cox – lead vocals, guitar, percussion, keyboards, electronics (2001–present)
- Moses Archuleta – drums, percussion, electronics (2001–present)
- Lockett Pundt – guitar, occasional lead vocals, keyboards (2005–present)
- Josh McKay – bass guitar, organ (2013–present)
- Javier Morales – keyboards, piano, saxophone (2016–present)

Former

- Paul Harper – bass guitar (2001)
- Dan Walton – drums (2001)
- Colin Mee – guitar (2001–2007, 2007–2008)
- Justin Bosworth – bass guitar (2001–2004; died 2004)
- Josh Fauver – bass guitar (2004–2012; died 2018)
- Whitney Petty – guitar (2008–2009)
- Frankie Broyles – guitar (2012–2014)
- Rhasaan Manning – percussion (2016–2017)
- Adam Bruneau – "auxiliary drum kit in one line-up"

== Discography ==
=== Studio albums ===
- Turn It Up Faggot (2005)
- Cryptograms (2007)
- Microcastle (2008)
- Weird Era Cont. (2008)
- Halcyon Digest (2010)
- Monomania (2013)
- Fading Frontier (2015)
- Why Hasn't Everything Already Disappeared? (2019)

=== Extended plays ===
- Fluorescent Grey (2007)
- Rainwater Cassette Exchange (2009)

== Touring ==
During live shows, Cox has worn sundresses and has performed with fake blood smeared over his face and hands, their live show being "much more savage" than their albums. In his explanation of the sundresses Cox has said, "I don't like the idea of going around stage in just jeans and a t-shirt. It seems anticlimactic".

Deerhunter have supported many bands on tour, including Nine Inch Nails, Spoon, The Smashing Pumpkins, The Fiery Furnaces, Lower Dens, and Kings of Leon.

== See also ==
- Atlas Sound – Bradford Cox's solo project
- Lotus Plaza – Lockett Pundt's solo project
- Moon Diagrams – Moses Archuleta's solo project
- List of ambient music artists
