= Bradford Cox =

American singer-songwriter and musician (born 1982)

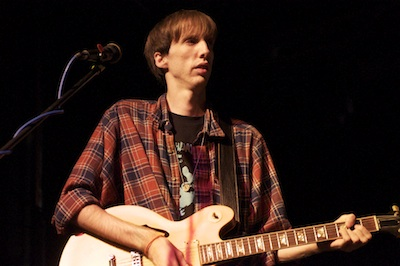
- Cox in 2009

Background information
- Also known as: Atlas Sound
- Born: Bradford James Cox; May 15, 1982 (age 44); Athens, Georgia, U.S.
- Origin: Atlanta, Georgia, U.S.
- Genres: Indie rock; noise rock; avant-pop; electronic
- Occupations: Singer-songwriter; musician; actor
- Instruments: Vocals; guitar; percussion; keyboards; bass guitar; drums; harmonica
- Years active: 2001–present
- Labels: HOSS; Rob's House; Kranky; 4AD; K
- Member of: Deerhunter

Bradford James Cox (born May 15, 1982) is an American singer-songwriter and musician, best known as the lead singer and guitarist of the indie rock band Deerhunter. Cox formed Deerhunter with Paul Harper and Dan Walton in 2001, and, to date, the band has released eight studio albums, along with several singles and EPs.

Cox also pursues a solo career under the moniker Atlas Sound, a name he has used since he was ten to refer to his own music. Cox has released four studio albums to date under this name: Let the Blind Lead Those Who Can See but Cannot Feel (2008), Logos (2009), Parallax (2011), and Thanatos (2026). Cox's method of creating music is stream of consciousness, and he does not write lyrics in advance.

== Early life ==
Cox was born with Marfan syndrome, a genetic disorder that affects connective tissue in the body. As a teenager, he dropped out of high school, although he later earned a GED; his parents later divorced, leaving him "to live in my childhood home alone. I literally lived in this large suburban house by myself". Cox has called his changing musical taste while growing up reflective of his life and mental state. Around the age of 10, his Marfan syndrome began to affect his body in more visible ways, leading to the point at which he "first started looking awkward".

Around the same time, Cox became interested in how music could sound "heartbreaking or nostalgic or melancholy"; he identified greatly with the title character of the 1990 film Edward Scissorhands, and especially enjoyed the Danny Elfman-composed soundtrack. During his teenage years, Cox's tastes shifted to music that was more "monotonous or hypnotic", such as the Stereolab album Transient Random-Noise Bursts with Announcements (1993).

In 1997, at the age of 15, Cox designed the font "Polaroid 22", which would later be used on the album covers for Papa Roach's Lovehatetragedy (2002) and Avril Lavigne's Under My Skin (2004).

Around 20 years of age, his life situation and health brought about "a period", during which he claimed he had become "only interested in this certain sort of suburban psychedelic pastoral thing. It was escapism. I didn't want as much emotional manipulation. It's kind of the opposite of Edward Scissorhands".

== Music career ==
=== Deerhunter ===
Cox founded Deerhunter with bassist Paul Harper and drummer Dan Walton, who named the band, in early 2001. The band expanded after Cox met Moses Archuleta, at the time a homeless teenager who was sleeping on the floor of some of Cox's friends. Archuleta initially played the Ace Tone organ and electronics. The band's first shows were experimental and based on improvisation. Cox continued recording slightly more structured material and releasing it on CD-R and cassette using the name Atlas Sound. Harper was soon replaced by Justin Bosworth, while Colin Mee had also joined the band on guitar around the time. Walton also eventually left the band, and Cox suggested Archuleta replace him on drums. The band's live shows and recordings became more song-oriented. They recorded their debut 7" for Die Slaughterhaus. Josh Fauver joined the band on bass in 2004 after Bosworth died in a skateboarding accident. This four-piece lineup recorded Deerhunter's debut album Turn It Up Faggot (2005), releasing it on Atlanta-based label Stickfigure Records.

Cox suggested Lockett Pundt, whom he befriended while attending Harrison High School in Kennesaw, Georgia, join the band on guitar so that he could concentrate more on vocals and electronics. This five-piece lineup recorded their breakthrough album, Cryptograms (2007). Mee then left the band after failing to show up for a North American tour. As a four-piece again, the band subsequently released three albums: Microcastle (2008), Weird Era Cont. (2008), and Halcyon Digest (2010) with this lineup. Fauver then left the band and was replaced by Josh McKay on bass.

The band now consisted of Cox on guitar and vocals, Pundt on guitar and occasional vocals, McKay on bass, and Archuleta on drums for both albums Monomania (2013) and Fading Frontier (2015). The band announced in 2018 that Fauver had died unexpectedly.

Deerhunter's most recent album, Why Hasn't Everything Already Disappeared? (2019), saw Javier Morales join the band, playing a wide variety of instruments such as the piano, tenor saxophone and bass clarinet. The band has remained inactive since the conclusion of the 2019 tour for Why Hasn't Everything Already Disappeared?.

=== Atlas Sound ===
Atlas Sound is the solo musical project of Cox, a name he has used since he started making music between the ages of ten and eleven. The name derived from the brand of cassette deck he used. Cox would use two cassette decks, which he used to layer guitar and drum sounds, as well as his own voice. In listening to some of these old tapes, of which Cox believes he has over five hundred in storage, he found, "some of it absolutely, terrifyingly bad, but sometimes I'm just like, 'Wow, that's cool'. That's actually how some Deerhunter songs happened. 'Spring Hall Convert' [from Cryptograms] was like that. That was a tape I made in ninth or tenth grade". Cox's early musical inspirations included The Stooges, Sonic Youth, Stereolab and Steve Reich among others.

Cox began the Atlas Sound project in its current form in the wake of his work with Deerhunter, saying "I have ideas that I can't make work with a five-piece rock band... There's kind of this palette of sounds that I use that I don't necessarily get to use with Deerhunter". In an interview with Pitchfork, Cox pointed out that, as the music that Deerhunter makes is a collaborative effort, Cox does not want to assert himself as the band's principal songwriter, saying:

"There's five musicians in that band that are all excellent and have excellent ideas. I've never intended to be, or wanted to be presented as, the principal songwriter in that band. So I might have an idea for a fragment of a song, but I want to leave it skeletal so the guys can fill it out. Whereas with Atlas Sound, everything is done in an hour".

Cox writes his music using a stream of consciousness method by not writing lyrics in advance and constructing songs by adding new parts until he feels "it's getting crowded".

Atlas Sound was chosen by Animal Collective to perform at the 2011 edition of the All Tomorrow's Parties festival.

==== Let the Blind Lead Those Who Can See but Cannot Feel (2008) ====
Cox released his first solo album, Let the Blind Lead Those Who Can See But Cannot Feel, on February 18, 2008, on Kranky in the US and on 4AD in Europe. The songs were recorded on Ableton Live using an array of computer-based instruments, as well as his own live recordings. The lyrics of Let the Blind Lead are autobiographical in nature, reflecting life experiences of Cox.

The album mostly used computer-based MIDI instruments, created and recorded in Ableton. Effects that were not already built into the program were seldom used.

==== Logos (2009) ====
Cox's second album, Logos, released on October 19, 2009, on Kranky in the US and on 4AD in Europe. An unfinished version of Logos had previously leaked onto the internet in August 2008. In response, Cox almost ceased production on the record, later saying, "I did not react well to the leak, in retrospect. It became the kind of internet-fueled drama that I was quickly learning to despise".

In discussing Logos, Cox characterised his first album as being a "bedroom laptop type thing" and "very introverted". In contrast, Logos was written in several parts of the world, and is "not about me. There are collaborations with other musicians. The lyrics are not autobiographical. The view is a lot more panoramic and less close-up. I became bored with introspection". The album features vocal contributions from both Lætitia Sadier of Stereolab and Noah Lennox of Animal Collective.

In January 2010, the Natural History Museum in Los Angeles hosted Cox for a one-off show which was free with admission to the museum.

==== Bedroom Databank, Vols. 1-4 (2010) ====
In November 2010, Cox published four volumes of demos available as free downloads on his blog, entitled Bedroom Databank, Vols. 1-4. Pitchfork described the two and a half hours' worth of material as being "four albums' worth of tossed-off ditties and more fully fleshed-out demos", and also commented that "sonically, the collection runs from straightforward folk-pop to electronic instrumentals and songs that fall somewhere in between".

The Quietus noted that many of the tracks had been recorded in hotel rooms across the world during Cox's time touring as Atlas Sound and with Deerhunter, also commenting on the release, saying, "What's amazing about these four, pretty much full-length albums, is the quality of the tracks on offer. It doesn't feel like he's just thrown some tapes down the steps of the attic and straight onto the internet".

The Bedroom Databank files were taken down from MediaFire by Sony Music, but they later apologised to Cox, stating that the files "were mistakenly removed".

==== Parallax (2011) ====
Cox released his third album as Atlas Sound, Parallax, on November 7, 2011, on 4AD. In an interview with Spin, Cox described the recording of the album as, "very exhausting to make, even though it was comfortable and detached. It is the loneliest record that I've ever made". After Parallax was recorded, Bradford Cox continued touring with Deerhunter, which was greatly stressful for him and led to his having a nervous breakdown.

In Andrew Ryce's review of the album for Resident Advisor, he commented on the change in sound compared to Let the Blind Lead Those Who Can See but Cannot Feel and Logos, commenting, "Where Cox's previous albums sounded like literal "bedroom" electronica, all boxed-in rhythms and heavy-lidded melodies, Parallax is the product of a studio". BBC Music also provided a positive review of the album, adding, "Parallax [is] Cox's most coherent record to date... he is currently the most gifted, fascinating and beguiling songwriter around, as well as the most prolific".

The album artwork features a photograph of Cox taken by Mick Rock, who had previously shot photographs for albums such as The Stooges' Raw Power (1973), Syd Barrett's The Madcap Laughs (1970), and Lou Reed's Transformer (1972).

The following year in May 2012, Cox performed a show from the rooftop of the Team Gallery in SoHo, New York City, which was shut down by the police after two songs, forcing both Cox and the crowd to move into the gallery where he performed an acoustic set for two Ryan McGinley exhibitions.

==== Hiatus ====
Cox's Atlas Sound project lapsed into inactivity following the release of Parallax, with Cox focusing on releasing three further albums as part of Deerhunter. Cox then remained completely inactive following Deerhunter's tour for their eighth and most recent album Why Hasn't Everything Already Disappeared? in late 2019. Years later in July 2023, Stereogum reported that Cox had performed a one-off noise show in Athens, Georgia alongside guitarist and songwriter Tom Carter.

In September 2026, Cox, as Atlas Sound, performed a show at Making Time Festival in Philadelphia which saw him perform eight new songs, described as, "largely soft and ruminative, full of tender synth drones and echo-brushed vocals". The names of the tracks were printed on set lists and lyric sheets that Cox handed out to members of the audience.

==== Thanatos (2026) ====
On October 31, 2026, Cox released a single titled "Octoberland" on 4AD, the first Atlas Sound release since Parallax in 2011. A surprise release, Cox's fourth album as Atlas Sound, Thanatos, was released on November 20, 2026. The release marks the 1,000th release on 4AD.

Cox wrote, performed and recorded the album alone in the attic of his home in Grant Park, Atlanta. The album was recorded on a Tascam DP-008 and the vinyl edition of the album comes with writing from Cate Le Bon where she adds:

"Each vocal take is a performance... Each instrument played like it's his last night on earth... The Tascam, a tool to distil the process down to the fundamentals of subtraction and addition. The former a by-product of the latter. Nothing deleted but instead painted over with new emotion or the same gesture repeated with the urgency of the moment".

Cox is also due to perform at numerous festivals in 2027, including at Big Ears Festival alongside fellow Deerhunter member Lockett Pundt in April, followed by a solo show at Primavera Sound in Barcelona, Spain in June.

== Other work ==
Cox has also recorded as part of other bands, such as the short lived "Wet Dreams", an otherwise all-girl garage / noise band in which he played drums. He also recorded several tracks on Black Lips' second album We Did Not Know the Forest Spirit Made the Flowers Grow (2004), additionally playing drums on the song "Notown Blues".

He also was a part of the "avant-garage" band Ghetto Cross, with Cole Alexander of Black Lips, Frankie Broyles of Omni and Balkans, and Asha Lakra.

Cox contributed to the Karen O-scored soundtrack for the 2009 Spike Jonze film, Where the Wild Things Are.

Cox portrayed the character Sunflower in the 2013 film Dallas Buyers Club, directed by Jean-Marc Vallée. In the same year, Cox created the soundtrack for Teenage, a documentary film directed by Matt Wolf based on Teenage: The Creation of Youth Culture, a book by Jon Savage.

In early 2019, Cox made his runway debut at a fashion show for Gucci in the Capitoline Museums in Rome, Italy.

In September 2019, Cox collaborated with Cate Le Bon, releasing a joint EP, Myths 004.

In July 2025, Cox hosted a two-part set on NTS Radio titled, Bradford Cox: Summer and Smoke Pt. 1 (Day) and Pt. 2 (Night). In October of the same year, Cox hosted another set for NTS titled, Bradford Cox: October 1958.

== Equipment ==
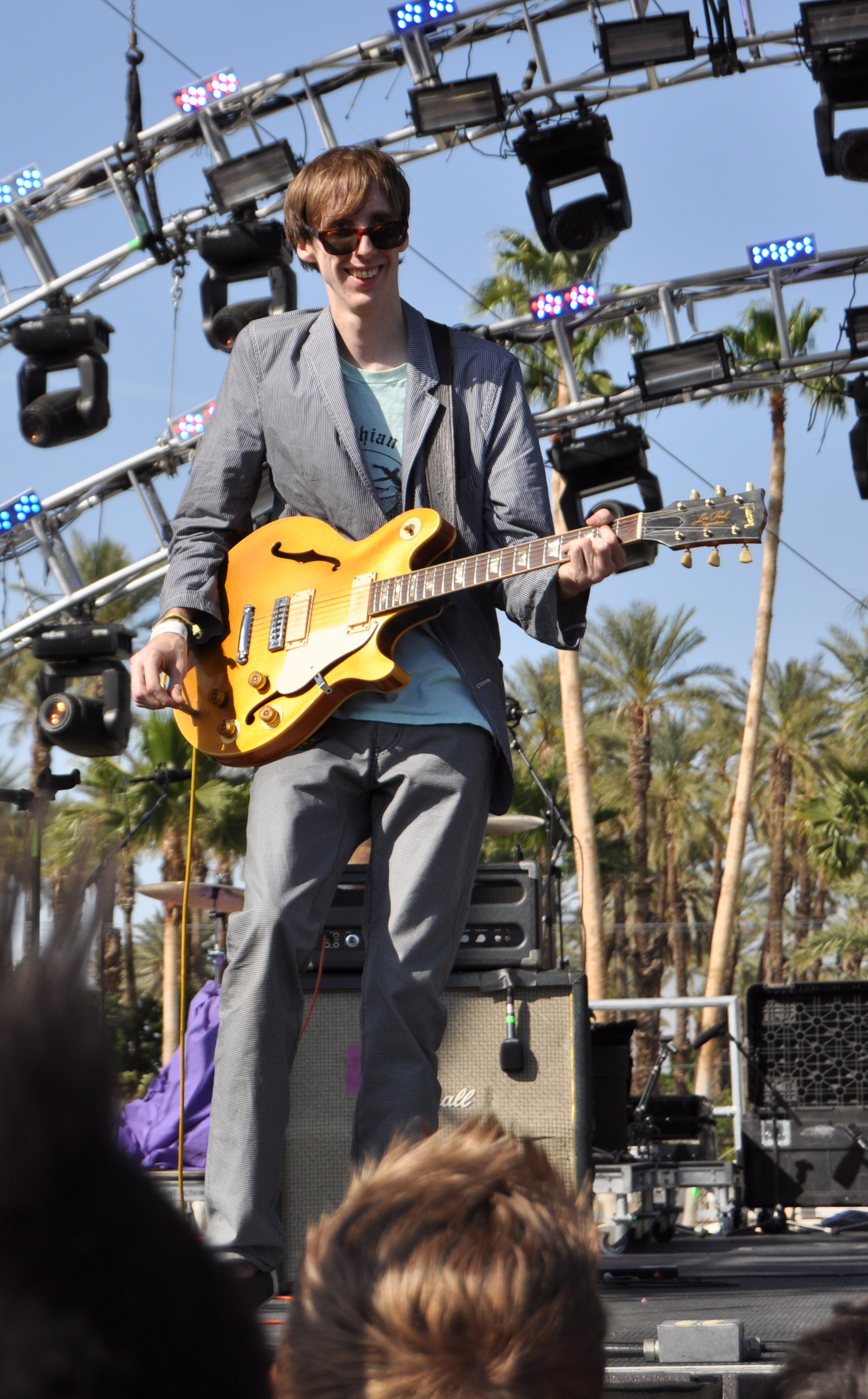
Cox with Deerhunter in 2010

=== Guitars ===
For the most part, Bradford favors vintage and modern Fender and Gibson guitars. Some of his guitars include:

- Fender Jaguar (1964 Fiesta Red, Formerly owned by Stereolab's Tim Gane)
- Fender Jazzmaster (1966, Block Inlays Originally white, has aged to a yellow color)
- Fender Stratocaster
- '74 Gibson Les Paul Signature
- Fender Bronco (70s stripped natural finish)
- Teisco Del-Rey EV-2, Humbuckers, Blue (possibly modified)
- Various Gibson Acoustics
- EKO 60's 12 String Acoustic
- Epiphone Small Body Acoustic strung in "Nashville Tuning"

=== Effects and amplifiers ===
Pedalboards

Bradford Cox's Deerhunter Pedalboard as of 2016 Tours.

1966 Fender Jazzmaster into – (signal chain as follows)

- Boss TU-2 Chromatic Tuner
- Fairfield Circuitry Unpleasant Surprise (Used for Lead Parts, Noise)
- Henretta Engineering Chord Blaster (Used For Overdrive)
- Eventide PitchFactor
- Behringer Reverb Machine RV600
- Ibanez CF7 Chorus / Flanger (Rarely Used)
- Ibanez DE7
- Line 6 DL4
- Boss Noise Suppressor

Out to Fender Hot Rod DeVille 4x10

Cox also uses an exposed spring reverb tank / filter unit for noise and effects

Vocal effects pedal board Beyerdynamic M69 microphone into:

- Digitech DigiVerb (through mic for backwards vocals only)
- Digitech DigiDelay (through mic for vocal loops only)
- Eventide MixingLink preamp / FX loop

Amps

When playing live with Deerhunter, Bradford previously used a Univox U-1226 Head into a vintage Marshall 4x10 Cabinet. He has also used a Marshall JCM800 half-stack, and occasionally a 1970s Peavey Classic combo amplifier. He currently uses a Fender Hot Rod DeVille 410.

== Songwriting ==
Cox describes his mode of songwriting as "automatic or stream of consciousness". Speaking to Victoria Segal of Q in November 2010, Cox said:

"Usually I go into a sort of trance and I'll have five or six songs afterwards... What is interesting is seeing how the band adapts them and mutates them into the final product. Lots of accidents and primitive irrational things happen. It can be difficult trying to explain the process to a producer or engineer. They generally want to help you polish things and I tend to want to sabotage that".

Speaking to Prefix Magazine in February 2008, Cox spoke further of his stream of consciousness songwriting and use of effects:

"The reason I used effects in the first place was to use the vocals as more of an instrument. To have it be on the same level as the instruments. Because I'm not a "songwriter" and I don't write lyrics in advance, I'm more interested in ambiguity, sonically too, in terms of the way things mix. I prefer it to be a little bit skewed. The traditional concept that the vocals are supposed to be mixed pretty high, but I guess that concept was thrown out the window a long time ago".

== Personal life ==
Cox has identified as asexual and non-binary, declaring in 2016 that "I am a virgin at 34 years old" and confirming again in 2019, in an interview with Mitchell Kugo of Out, that he was still a virgin; in the same interview, he mentioned that sex is just one of many things that he has never tried and has little interest in seeking out, much like heroin, cocaine. or "driv[ing] a motorcycle up the Pacific Coast Highway", adding that "perhaps, one day, that opportunity will seem [...] not enticing, but just convenient.

In the past, he has also described himself as gay and queer, stating in a 2011 Rolling Stone interview that "asexuality is sort of like a comfort zone where you don't get rejected".

In December 2014, Cox was hospitalized after being hit by a car in Atlanta.

== Discography ==
With Deerhunter:

- Turn It Up Faggot (2005)
- Cryptograms (2007)
- Microcastle (2008)
- Weird Era Cont. (2008)
- Halcyon Digest (2010)
- Monomania (2013)
- Fading Frontier (2015)
- Why Hasn't Everything Already Disappeared? (2019)

As Atlas Sound:

- Let the Blind Lead Those Who Can See but Cannot Feel (2008)
- Logos (2009)
- Parallax (2011)
- Thanatos (2026)

With Cate Le Bon

- Myths 004 (2019)
