= Asher Roth discography =

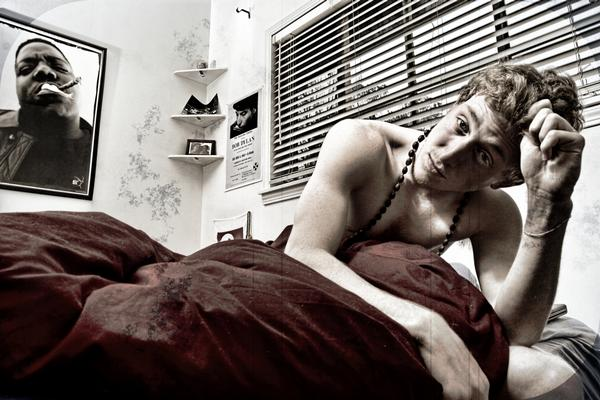
- Asher Roth in 2009
- Studio albums: 3
- Extended plays: 6
- Singles: 15
- Music videos: 24
- Mixtapes: 6

The discography of Asher Roth, an American hip hop recording artist, consists of three studio albums, five extended plays (EPs), six mixtapes, 15 singles (including four as a featured artist) and 24 music videos. As of February 2014, his debut album Asleep in the Bread Aisle, has sold 214,000 copies in the US, according to Nielsen SoundScan.

== Albums ==
=== Studio albums ===
List of studio albums, with selected chart positions and certifications
Title	Album details	Peak chart positions						Certifications
Title	Album details	US	US R&B/HH	US Rap	CAN	GER	UK	Certifications
Asleep in the Bread Aisle	Released: April 20, 2009 (US); Label: Schoolboy, SRC, Universal Motown; Formats: CD, LP, digital download	5	5	3	31	87	38	RIAA: Gold
RetroHash	Released: April 22, 2014 (US); Label: Federal Prism, Pale Fire; Formats: CD, LP, Digital download	45	12	6	—	—	—	
Flowers on the Weekend	Released: April 23, 2020 (US); Label: RetroHash LLC; Formats: CD, LP, Digital download	—	—	—	—	—	—	
"—" denotes a recording that did not chart or was not released in that territory.

=== Mixtapes ===
List of mixtapes, with selected details
Title	Album details
Believe the Hype	Released: August 8, 2006; Label: Lock-N-Load; Formats: Digital download
The Greenhouse Effect Vol. 1	Released: June 15, 2008; Label: Self-released; Formats: Digital download; Hosted by DJ Drama and Don Cannon
Seared Foie Gras with Quince and Cranberry	Released: March 23, 2010; Label: Self-released; Formats: Digital download; Hosted by DJ Wreckineyez
Pabst & Jazz	Released: December 20, 2011; Label: Self-released; Formats: Digital download; Hosted by Blended Babies
The Greenhouse Effect Vol. 2	Released: June 25, 2013; Label: Self-released; Formats: Digital download; Hosted by DJ Drama and Don Cannon
The Greenhouse Effect Vol. 3	Released: September 3, 2021; Label: Retrohash, LLC; Formats: Digital download

== EPs ==
List of extended plays, with selected details
Title	Details
Just Listen	Released: April 20, 2005 (US); Label: Lock-N-Load; Formats: Digital download
The Rawth EP (with Nottz Raw)	Released: December 23, 2010; Label: Self-released; Formats: Digital download
Rawther (with Nottz and Travis Barker)	Released: February 4, 2016; Label: Self-released; Formats: Digital download
GEV3-Piece	Released: August 25, 2021; Label: Retrohash, LLC; Formats: Digital download
Why's It So Grey Out? (with Heather Grey)	Released: April 13, 2022; Label: Retrohash, LLC; Formats: Digital download, Streaming
Temporary Heaven (with Heather Grey)	Released: April 10, 2024; Label: Retrohash, LLC; Formats: Digital download, Streaming

== Singles ==
=== As lead artist ===
List of singles as lead artist, with selected chart positions and certifications, showing year released and album name
Title	Year	Peak chart positions							Certifications	Album
Title	Year	US	US Rap	AUT	CAN	GER	IRE	UK	Certifications	Album
"I Love College"	2009	12	18	53	53	58	41	26	RIAA: 2× Platinum; BPI: Silver	Asleep in the Bread Aisle
"Lark on My Go-Kart"	2009	95	—	—	—	—	—	—		Asleep in the Bread Aisle
"Be by Myself" (featuring CeeLo Green)	2009	— (Note: "Be by Myself" did not enter the Billboard Hot 100, but peaked at number seven on the Bubbling Under Hot 100 Singles chart, which acts as an extension to the Hot 100.)	—	—	—	—	—	—		Asleep in the Bread Aisle
"She Don't Wanna Man" (featuring Keri Hilson)	2009	—	—	—	—	—	—	156		Asleep in the Bread Aisle
"G.R.I.N.D (Get Ready It's a New Day)"	2010	79	—	—	67	—	—	—		non-album single
"Last Man Standing" (featuring Akon)	2011	—	—	—	—	—	—	—		Madden NFL 12 soundtrack
"Party Girl" (featuring Meek Mill)	2012	— (Note: "Party Girl" did not enter the Billboard Hot 100, but peaked at number 20 on the Bubbling Under Hot 100 Singles chart, which acts as an extension to the Hot 100.)	—	—	—	—	—	—		non-album singles
"Gotta Get Up" (featuring D.A. of Chester French)	2012	—	—	—	—	—	—	—		non-album singles
"Apples & Bananas"	2013	—	—	—	—	—	—	—		The Greenhouse Effect Vol. 2
"Tangerine Girl"	2014	—	—	—	—	—	—	—		RetroHash
"Fast Life" (featuring Vic Mensa)	2014	—	—	—	—	—	—	—		RetroHash
"That's Cute"	2015	—	—	—	—	—	—	—		non-album singles
"Sushi" (with Fat Tony)	2015	—	—	—	—	—	—	—		non-album singles
"Laundry" (featuring Michael Christmas and Larry June)	2016	—	—	—	—	—	—	—		non-album singles
"Wu Financial" (featuring The Cool Kids)	2017	—	—	—	—	—	—	—		non-album singles
"Electric Heart" (with Oren Yoel as Tofer Dolan)	2017	—	—	—	—	—	—	—		non-album singles
"Picassos on a Yacht" (with Oren Yoel as Tofer Dolan)	2018	—	—	—	—	—	—	—		non-album singles
"Beach House" (with Besphrenz)	2018	—	—	—	—	—	—	—		non-album singles
"Mommydog" (featuring CJ Smith)	2018	—	—	—	—	—	—	—		Flowers on the Weekend
"Way More Fun" (featuring Lil Yachty)	2020	—	—	—	—	—	—	—		Flowers on the Weekend
"—" denotes a recording that did not chart or was not released in that territory.

=== As featured artist ===
List of singles, with selected chart positions, showing year released and album name
Title	Year	Album
"Break the Silence" (Big Prime featuring Asher Roth)	2011	non-album single
"Dude" (Blended Babies featuring Asher Roth and Curren$y)	2013	RetroHash
"Lisa" (Ro James featuring Asher Roth)	2013	Jack EP
"See the World" (Blended Babies featuring Asher Roth, Chuck Inglish and ZZ Ward)	2013	non-album singles
"Sayin' Whatever" (Blended Babies featuring Asher Roth and Buddy)	2014	non-album singles
"Shadows" (Blended Babies featuring Sir Michael Rocks, Jon B., Like and Asher Roth)	2015	non-album singles
"Smile" (Étienne de Crécy featuring Alex Gopher and Asher Roth)	2015	Super Discount 3
"Sweat Shorts" (Chuck Inglish featuring Asher Roth and Helios Hussain)	2015	Everybody's Big Brother
"Freedom" (RichGains featuring Asher Roth, Jonathan Chapman and Leon Q. Allen)	2016	Gains
"Come Thru" (Jeff Bernat featuring Asher Roth)	2017	Afterwords
"Deep End" (Alexander Charles featuring Asher Roth)	2020	Fortune Cookies
"Trust Me" (Raphael Futura featuring Asher Roth)	2020	Riviera
"Beautiful Disaster"[59] A Certain Energy feat. Asher Roth	2021	Non Album Single
"—" denotes a title that did not chart, or was not released in that territory.

== Guest appearances ==
List of non-single guest appearances, with other performing artists, showing year released and album name
Title	Year	Artist(s)	Album
"Change Gonna Come"	2008	B.o.B, Charles Hamilton	—N/a
"Childish Games"	2010	Consequence	Movies on Demand
"Fuck the Money"	2010	B.o.B	May 25th
"Bold and Arrogant (Remix)"	2010	Emilio Rojas, Styles P	—N/a
"Catch Me If You Can (Remix)"	2010	Outasight	Best of All Worlds SXSW Showcase Mixtape
"Rock NYC (Remix)"	2010	Donny Goines, Mistah F.A.B., Rapper Big Pooh	—N/a
"Hot N Fun (Remix)"	2010	N.E.R.D., Nelly Furtado	—N/a
"DJ Made Me Do It"	2010	Shontelle	No Gravity
"We're Here to Save the Day"	2010	The Constellations	Southern Gothic
"We Beamin'"	2010	Lupe Fiasco, B.o.B, Blu, Charles Hamilton, The Cool Kids, Diggy, Dosage	—N/a
"Fat Raps" (Remix)	2010	Big Sean, Chuck Inglish, Chip tha Ripper, Dom Kennedy, Boldy James	Finally Famous Vol. 3: Big
"White Soft Porn"	2011	Game, Tyga, Mars	Purp & Patron: The Hangover
"More Gritz (Gritz Remix)"	2011	Kaimbr & Kev Brown, The Kid Daytona	The Alexander Green Project
"The Richers"	2011	TiRon, Blu	MSTRD
"Roof Tops"	2011	Luke Christopher	—N/a
"New Jeeps"	2011	Dom Kennedy, Mikey Rocks	From the Westside with Love, II
"Roll Call"	2011	The Cool Kids, Chip tha Ripper	When Fish Ride Bicycles
"Can We Chill"	2011	Marky	—N/a
"Useless"	2011	Pac Div	The DiV
"Song Amnesia"	2011	Scienze	When Skies Fall
"2 Complicated"	2011	Chris Brown	—N/a
"Boyfriend" (Remix)	2012	Justin Bieber, Mac Miller, 2 Chainz	—N/a
"Marley & Me" (Remix)	2012	Smoke DZA, Devin the Dude, Curren$y, June Summers	Substance Abuse
"Imma Be Cool"	2013	Cody Simpson	Surfers Paradise
"Make It Work"	2015	Blended Babies, Anderson .Paak, Donnie Trumpet	The Anderson .Paak EP

== Music videos ==
=== As lead artist ===
List of music videos, showing year released and director
Title	Year	Director(s)
"Roth Boys"	2008	Scooter Braun
"I Love College"	2009	Jonathan Lia, Scooter Braun
" Lark on my Go Kart"	2009	Ryan Maloney, Chad Wienzckowski
"Be By Myself"	2009	John Christopher Pina
"She Don't Wanna Man"	2009	Jonathan Lia
"Rik Smits"	2010	HND$M RND$M
"Muddy Swim Trunks"	2010	BBGUN (Alex Bergman, Maxim Bohichik)
"Toni Braxton"	2010	Ryan Maloney
"Enforce the Law" (with Nottz Raw)	2010	Fredo Tovar, Scott Fleishman
"Dontcha Wanna Be (My Neighbor)" (with Nottz Raw, featuring Colin Munroe)	2010	Shomi Patwary and Robert Elliott Simmons
"G.R.I.N.D. (Get Ready It's a New Day)"	2010	Marc Klasfeld
"Summertime" (featuring Quan)	2011	Shomi Patwary
"Last Man Standing" (featuring Akon)	2011	—N/a
"In the Kitchen" (featuring Chuck Inglish)	2011	Mike Waxx & Mike Carson
"Common Knowledge"	2011	Aristotle Torres
"Dope Shit" (featuring 1500 or Nothin)	2012	Aristotle Torres
"The Reading"	2013	Chimp
"Turnip the Beet"	2013	Rik Cordero
"Apples & Bananas"	2013	Ryan Maloney
"Tangerine Girl"	2014	Matt Spicer
"Fast Life" (featuring Vic Mensa)	2014	Smash Lefunk
"Parties At the Disco" (featuring ZZ Ward)	2014	Kenny Koller

=== As featured artist ===
List of music videos, showing year released and director
Title	Year	Director(s)
"Childish Games" (Consequence featuring Asher Roth)	2010	Rik Cordero
"Roof Tops" (Luke Christopher featuring Asher Roth)	2011	—N/a
"Started from the Bottom" (Remix) (Mike Posner featuring Asher Roth, T. Mills, King Chip and Chuck Inglish)	2013	—N/a
"See the World" (Blended Babies featuring Asher Roth and Chuck Inglish)	2013	—N/a
"Lisa" (Ro James featuring Asher Roth)	2014	AaronIsNotCool
