= Washed Out discography =

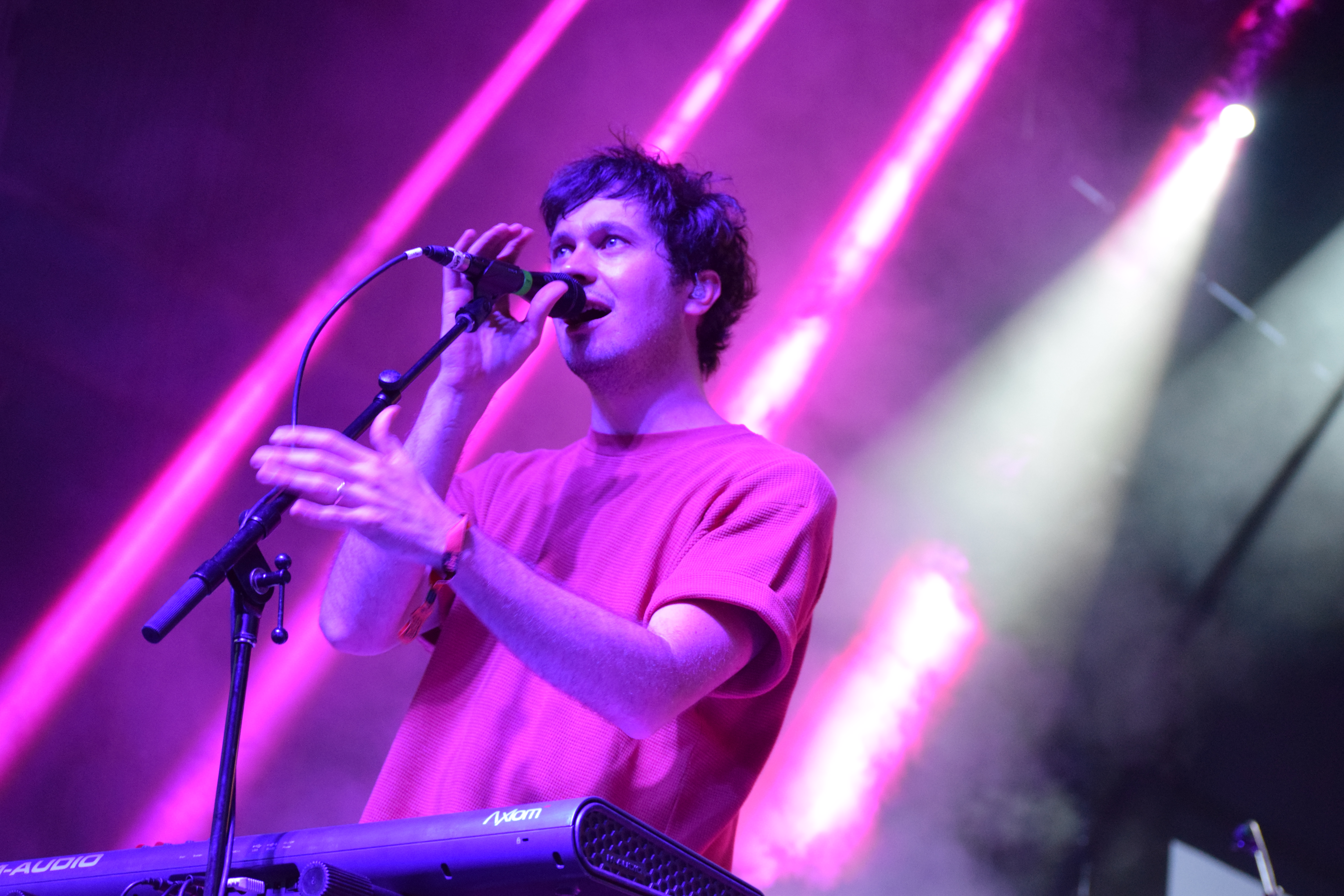
- Washed Out performing in July 2016
- Studio albums: 5
- EPs: 3
- Singles: 12
- Guest appearances: 6 49

The discography of the American singer, songwriter, and record producer Washed Out consists of five studio albums, three extended plays, twelve singles, and six guest appearances.

== Studio albums ==
Title	Album details	Peak chart positions									
Title	Album details	US	US Dance	US Indie	US Rock	AUS Hit	NOR	NL	NZ Heat	UK	UK Indie
Within and Without	Released: July 12, 2011; Label: Sub Pop; Formats: CD, LP, digital download	26	—	5	6	20	36	80	—	89	12
Paracosm	Released: August 13, 2013; Label: Sub Pop; Formats: CD, LP, digital download	21	—	3	5	7	—	—	—	101	21
Mister Mellow	Released: June 30, 2017; Label: Stones Throw; Formats: CD/DVD, LP, digital download	— (Note: "Mister Mellow" did not enter the Billboard 200 chart, but peaked at number 91 on the Top Current Album Sales chart.)	8	—	— (Note: "Mister Mellow" did not enter the Rock & Alternative Albums chart, but peaked at number 22 on the Alternative Album Sales chart.)	15	—	—	9	— (Note: Mister Mellow did not enter the UK Albums Chart, but peaked at number 36 on the UK Record Store Chart.)	—
Purple Noon	Released: August 7, 2020; Label: Sub Pop; Formats: CD, LP, cassette, digital download	— (Note: "Purple Noon" did not enter the Billboard 200 chart, but peaked at number 18 on the Top Current Album Sales chart.)	—	35	33	—	—	—	—	— (Note: Purple Noon did not enter the UK Albums Chart, but peaked at number 20 on the UK Record Store Chart.)	— (Note: Purple Noon did not enter the UK Independent Albums Chart, but peaked at number 22 on the UK Independent Album Breakers Chart.)
Notes from a Quiet Life	Released: June 28, 2024; Label: Sub Pop; Formats: CD, LP, digital download	— (Note: "Notes from a Quiet Life" did not enter the Billboard 200 chart, but peaked at number 41 on the Top Current Album Sales chart.)	19	—	—	—	—	—	—	—	—
"—" denotes a recording that did not chart or was not released in that territory.

== Extended plays ==
Title	Details
High Times	Released: September 9, 2009; Label: Mirror Universe Tapes; Format: Cassette (200 copies)
Life of Leisure	Released: September 16, 2009; Label: Mexican Summer; Format: CD, LP, digital download
Untitled	Released: 2010; Label: N/A; Format: CD (offered to fans on tour)

== Singles ==
Title	Year	Peak positions				Certifications	Album
Title	Year	US Sales	US Dance	US Rock DL	MEX Air.	Certifications	Album
"Feel It All Around"	2009	—	—	—	13	RIAA: Platinum	Life of Leisure EP
"You'll See It (Small Black Remix)"	2010	43	—	—	—		Washed Out/Small Black split
"Eyes Be Closed"	2011	—	10	—	50		Within and Without
"Amor Fati"	2011	—	—	46	—		Within and Without
"It All Feels Right"	2013	—	—	—	49		Paracosm
"Don't Give Up"	2013	—	—	—	—		Paracosm
"Get Lost"	2017	—	—	—	—		Mister Mellow
"Hard to Say Goodbye"	2017	—	—	—	—		Mister Mellow
"Face Up"	2018	—	—	—	—		Purple Noon
"Too Late"	2020	—	—	—	—		Purple Noon
"Time to Walk Away"	2020	—	—	—	—		Purple Noon
"Sidney's Lullaby" / "Miles' Lullaby"	2021	—	—	—	—		Non-album single
"—" denotes a title that did not chart, or was not released in that territory.

== Guest appearances ==
Title	Year	Album
"You & I"	2010	Adult Swim Singles Program 2010
"Belong"	2010	Kitsuné Maison Compilation 9
"Straight Back"	2012	Just Tell Me That You Want Me: A Tribute to Fleetwood Mac
"Outta My System - Washed Out Remix"	2012	Outta My System: Remixez Y Friendz
"Want"	2015	Samantha
"Forgive"	2018	Young Romance
