= Ben H. Allen =

American record producer, mixer and songwriter

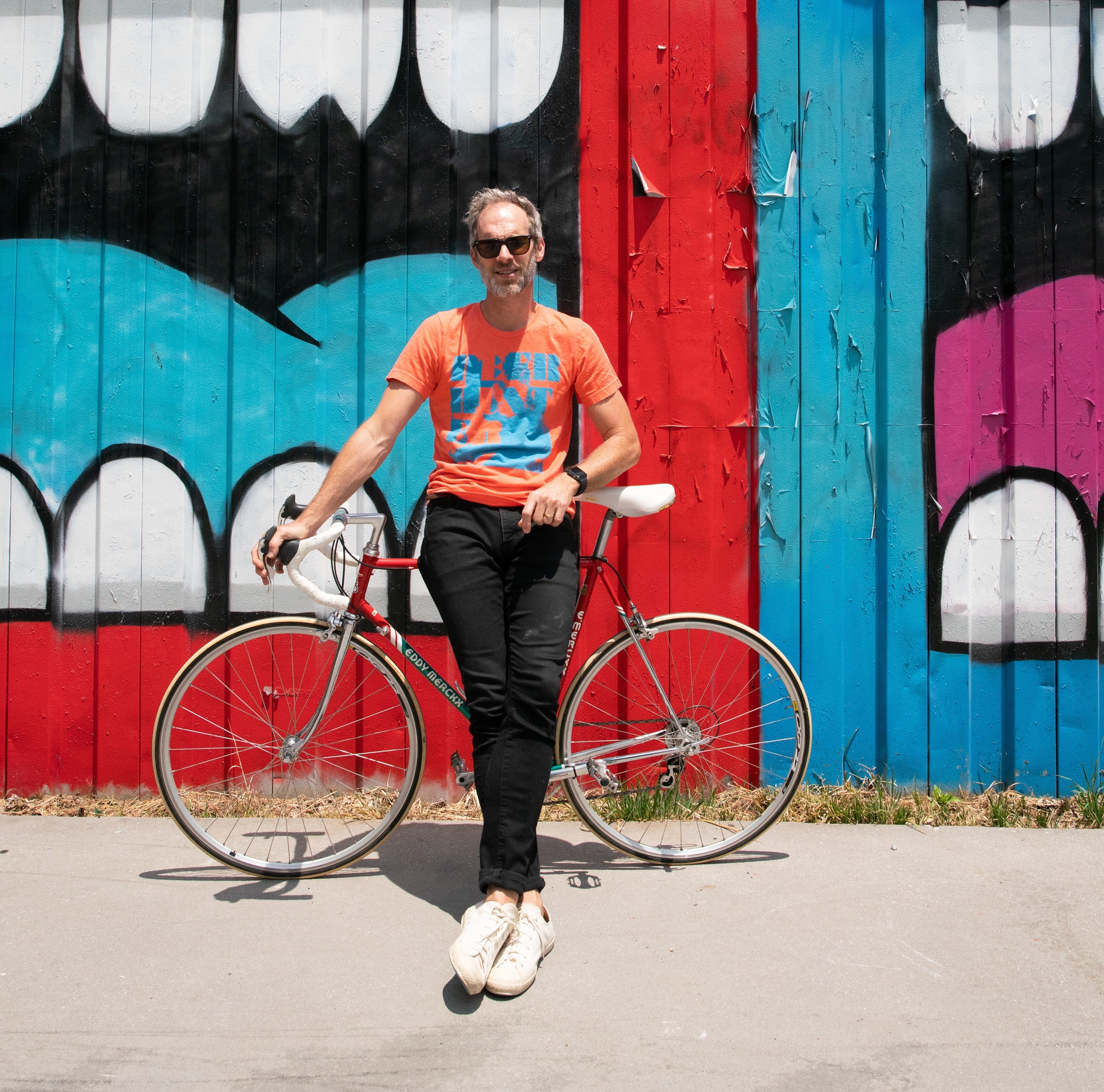
Allen on his Eddy Merckx in Reynoldstown, Atlanta, GA, 2023

Ben H. Allen III is an American record producer, mixer and songwriter, based in Atlanta, Georgia, United States. He has produced and mixed records by artists such as Soccer Mommy, M.I.A., Deerhunter, Walk the Moon, Animal Collective, Gnarls Barkley, Cut Copy, Washed Out and The Big Moon. He is also the owner of Maze Studios ATL, a recording studio in Atlanta, GA.

== Biography ==
=== Early years ===
Born in Athens, Georgia, Allen got his start recording his own and friends' bands on a four track cassette multitrack recorder in his parents' basement. Eventually moving to New York City, Allen's work at Battery Studios and The Cutting Room Studios subsequently led to the position as an engineer with Sean Combs's Bad Boy Records, working on records by Mase, Carl Thomas, The Notorious B.I.G., and others.

=== Return to Georgia ===
In 2001, he relocated to Atlanta, and began a long relationship with CeeLo Green, recording, producing and mixing records together, including 2006's St. Elsewhere by Gnarls Barkley also featuring Danger Mouse. The album reached No. 4 in the Billboard 200 as well as Platinum RIAA certification and won a Grammy Award for Best Urban Alternative Album.

His reputation for bringing the low-end aesthetics of Hip hop to Indie music led to numerous projects in that genre in the years to follow. In 2009, Allen recorded, mixed and co-produced Animal Collective's Merriweather Post Pavilion which received Album of The Year honors from publications including Spin and Entertainment Weekly. That same year Allen released Southern Gothic by The Constellations on his own record label MakeRecordsNotBombs, which was eventually re-released by Virgin Records in 2010. He also co-wrote and co-produced the Asher Roth single "I Love College" during this period and co-wrote "Here to Stay" for the international No. 1 album Back to Basics.

In 2010, Allen produced and mixed Deerhunter's Halcyon Digest, as well as releasing two EPs on MakeRecordsNotBombs by Athens, Georgia band Reptar. He also mixed singles for M.I.A. on her album MAYA. In 2011, Allen mixed Zonoscope for Australian band Cut Copy, as well as Within and Without by Washed Out. The same year, he reunited with CeeLo Green co-producing and co-writing the No. 2 Billboard Hot 100 single "Bright Lights Bigger City", which appeared on The Lady Killer. In 2012, Allen produced Walk the Moon's self-titled album, including the No. 7 Billboard Hot 100 single "Anna Sun".

== Personal life and advocacy ==
Allen currently resides in Atlanta, and works out of Maze Studios in the Reynoldstown neighborhood, which was featured prominently in the vinyl sleeve of Belle and Sebastian's Girls in Peacetime Want to Dance. He is known as an avid basketball fan and season ticket holder for the Atlanta Hawks, which created a public battle with notorious Boston Celtics fans Cut Copy over Twitter during the mixing of Zonoscope. He has also been an outspoken leader in the record industry, leading the opposition movement to a proposed ordinance by the city of Atlanta placing restrictions on recording studios to keep them from operating in proximity to residential areas. Allen was vocal about the adverse effects the proposed law would have on the music industry, speaking out at council meetings, in the media and lobbying council members. The ordinance was rejected by the Atlanta City Council on January 16, 2017. Allen has also appeared regularly as a guest lecturer in the University of Georgia music program.

== Discography ==
Ben H. Allen discography
Year	Artist	Album title	Label
2024	Maximo Park	Stream of Life	Lower Third
2024	Kaiser Chiefs	Easy Eighth Album	V2
2024	Soccer Mommy	Evergreen	Loma Vista
2023	Girl Ray	Prestige	Moshi Moshi
2021	Erasure	The Neon Remixed	Mute
2021	Ron Gallo	Peacemeal	New West
2021	Maxïmo Park	Nature Always Wins	Prolifica Inc
2020	Erasure	The Neon	Mute Records
2020	The Magic Gang	Death of the Party	Warner Records
2020	Hazel English	Wake Up!	Marathon Artists
2020	Washed Out	Purple Noon	Sub Pop Records
2020	Speelburg	Porsche	Sophomore Slump
2020	Ron Gallo	Peacemeal	New West Records
2019	Deerhunter	Why Hasn't Everything Already Disappeared?	4AD
2019	Japanese Wallpaper	Glow	Wonderlick, Sony Music
2019	The Big Moon	Walking Like We Do	Fiction Records
2018	Wild Moccasins	Look Together	New West Records
2017	GGOOLLDD	Teeth EP	Roll Call Records
2017	Childhood	Universal High	Marathon
2017	Dan Croll	Emerging Adulthood	Communion Group
2017	Magic Giant	In the Wind	Razor & Tie
2016	Royal Canoe	Something Got Lost Between Here and the Orbit	Nevado Records
2016	The Temper Trap	Thick as Thieves	Infectious Music
2016	Shock Machine	Open Up the Sky	Marathon
2015	Belle and Sebastian	Girls in Peacetime Want to Dance	Matador Records
2015	Deerhunter	Fading Frontier	4AD
2015	Neon Indian	Vega Intl. Night School	Octave
2015	Civil Twilight	Story of an Immigrant	Fiction Records
2015	Oberhofer	Chronovision	Glassnote Records
2014	Kaiser Chiefs	Education, Education, Education & War	Caroline Records
2014	Jeremy Messersmith	Heart Murmurs	Glassnote Records
2014	Delta Spirit	Into the Wide	Dualtone Records
2013	Youth Lagoon	Wondrous Bughouse	Fat Possum Records
2013	Cults	Static	Columbia Records
2013	Delphic	Collections	Chimeric Records
2013	Flagship	Flagship	Bright Antenna
2013	Washed Out	Paracosm	Weird World
2012	Walk the Moon	Walk the Moon	RCA Records
2012	Fanfarlo	Room Filled with Light	Atlantic Records
2012	Reptar	Body Faucet	MakeRecordsNotBombs
2012	Animal Collective	Centipede Hz	Domino Recording Company
2011	Rubik	Solar	Fullsteam Records
2011	Cut Copy	Zonoscope	Modular Recordings
2011	CeeLo Green	The Lady Killer	Elektra Records
2011	Bombay Bicycle Club	A Different Kind of Fix	Island Records
2011	Washed Out	Within and Without	Sub Pop
2011	Givers	In Light	Glassnote Records
2010	Deerhunter	Halcyon Digest	4AD
2010	M.I.A.	MAYA	XL Recordings
2010	Matt and Kim	Sidewalks	Fader Label
2010	The Constellations	Southern Gothic	MakeRecordsNotBombs
2009	Animal Collective	Merriweather Post Pavilion	Domino Recording Company
2009	Asher Roth	"I Love College"	Universal Music Group
2008	Gym Class Heroes	The Quilt	Decaydance
2007	Athlete	Beyond the Neighbourhood	Parlophone
2006	Christina Aguilera	Back to Basics	RCA Records
2006	Gnarls Barkley	St. Elsewhere	Atlantic Records
2004	CeeLo Green	Cee-Lo Green... Is the Soul Machine	Arista Records
2000	Carl Thomas	Emotional	Bad Boy Records
1999	Mase	Double Up	Bad Boy Records
1999	Puff Daddy	Forever	Bad Boy Records
