= Southern Gothic (disambiguation) =

Southern Gothic may refer to:

- Southern Gothic literature
- Southern Gothic (album), a 2010 album by The Constellations
- Southern Gothic (2007 film)
- Southern Gothic Productions, the production company of Hilarie Burton
- The Southern Gothic, an American country and rock music group
- Southern French Gothic, sometimes simply referred to as Southern Gothic, is a style of architecture particular to the south of France
