= Get Ready It's a New Day =

Get Ready It's a New Day or G.R.I.N.D may refer to:

- G.R.I.N.D. Get Ready It's a New Day, 2017 Philippine TV series
- "G.R.I.N.D (Get Ready It's a New Day)", 2010 song by Asher Roth
