= Today We're Believers =

Studio album by Royal Canoe
- Released: 3 September 2013
- Genre: Indie Rock
- Length: 37:02
- Label: Roll Call
- Producer: John Paul Peters, Royal Canoe

Royal Canoe chronology
Extended Play EP (2013)	Today We're Believers (2013)	Royal Canoe Does Beck's Song Reader (2014)

Professional ratings
Review scores
Source	Rating
Consequence of Sound	C−
Exclaim!	7/10
Now	3/5 stars

Today We're Believers is an album by Royal Canoe, released in 2013.

== Critical reception ==
PopMatters wrote that "while [the album's] scattershot approach might be appealing on the surface, at 12 songs – four of them eclipsing the five-minute mark – the record does feel a bit overlong." Now called the album "a smorgasbord of sound that’s all bongos, keyboards and languorous breakdowns that creep into repetitive territory."

== Track listing ==
1. "Today We're Believers" – 4:23
2. "Hold on to the Metal" – 3:54
3. "Just Enough" – 5:44
4. "Exodus of the Year" – 3:51
5. "Bathtubs" – 5:51
6. "Button Fumbla" – 4:53
7. "Show Me Your Eyes" – 3:16
8. "Birthday" – 3:44
9. "Nightcrawlin" – 5:44
10. "Stemming" – 4:40
11. "Light" – 2:59
12. "If I Had A House" – 6:27

== Personnel ==
- Matt Peters – vocals, keyboard, acoustic guitar
- Bucky Driedger – vocals, electric guitar
- Matt Schellenberg – vocals, keyboard
- Brendan Berg – vocals, bass guitar, keyboard
- Derek Allard – drums
- Michael Jordan – electronic drums
- Dan Ardies – baritone sax on "Show Me Your Eyes"
- John Paul Peters – percussion on "Just Enough", engineering, mixing
- Joao Carvalho – mastering
