= Reptar (band) =

American alternative rock band

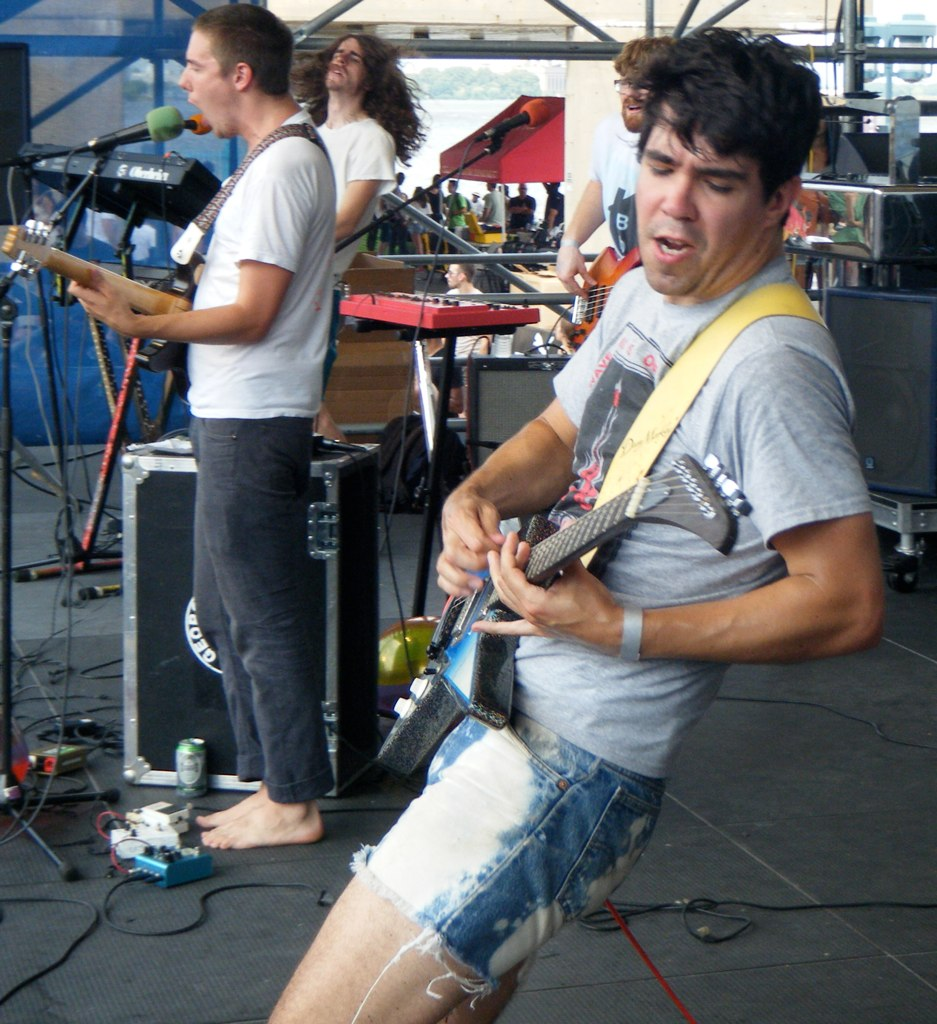

Background information
- Origin: Athens, Georgia, United States
- Genre: Alternative rock
- Years active: 2009-present (Inactive)
- Labels: Joyful Noise Recordings, Vagrant Records, Lucky Number Music
- Members: Graham Ulicny; Ryan Engelberger; William Kennedy; Andrew McFarland
- Website: reptarmusic.bandcamp.com

Reptar is an American band from Athens, Georgia founded by members Graham Ulicny (guitar, vocals), Ryan Engelberger (bass), William Kennedy (keyboards) and Andrew McFarland (drums).

== History ==
=== Early years (2008–2013) ===
Reptar was formed in 2008 in Athens, Georgia by vocalist Graham Ulicny, bassist Ryan Engelberger, keyboardist William Kennedy, and drummer Andrew McFarland. Local alt-weekly Flagpole described Reptar as "a staple of the local house-party scene at the turn of the decade". The four-piece toured heavily during their initial years, with comparisons to indietronica acts such as Passion Pit. AllMusic contributor Gregory Heaney described Reptar's sound as "exuberant indie rock [...] distinguished by punchy rhythms, shimmering synths, brass, and Graham Ulicny's idiosyncratic vocals." The band's name is taken from the Rugrats character Reptar, which singer/guitarist Graham Ulicny explained "I first tried to name the band Invisible Boyfriend, and everybody goes, 'that is the stupidest name I have ever heard in my life.'" Said Ulicny: "[Reptar] is the second stupidest band name we have ever heard."

The band's performance at the 2011 edition of South by Southwest increased their profile. That July, the band released their debut extended play, Oblangle Fizz Y'all, released through Vagrant Records and Make Records not Bombs. Both Oblangle and the band's debut studio album, Body Faucet, were produced by Ben H. Allen, known for his work with Animal Collective and Matt & Kim. Body Faucet was released in May 2012, and reached number seven on the Billboard Heatseekers chart. Online publication Pitchfork notably panned the album, with reviewer Ian Cohen deriding it as an amalgamation of "the past five years of top-shelf indie into some kind of frat party-stoking jungle juice." Jace Bartlet (guitar) joined in 2012, playing his first show at the Georgia Theater for New Year's Eve 2011-2012.

During the exhaustive touring schedule for Body Faucet, the group's relationship with their record label and management grew poor. The band took a hiatus; frontman Ulicny briefly moved to California before returning to Athens to develop their second full-length.

=== Recent years (2014–present) ===
In 2014, the band began recording their second studio effort, Lurid Glow. Produced by local stalwart Andy LeMaster, known for his work with Conor Oberst and Drive-By Truckers, the LP was recorded and funded during breaks in their touring schedule. For the release, the now quartet partnered with Joyful Noise Recordings for distribution. As the album cycle for Lurid Glow drew to a close, Ulicny again relocated, this time to Nebraska, where he began to perform keyboards in the dance-punk act The Faint. In addition, the rest of the band's members pursued other projects as well: McFarland and Engelberger continued operating under the name Semicircle, and Engelberger released solo material under the moniker Curt Castle. McFarland also joined the alt-country band Neighbor Lady, while Jace Bartlet formed the metal outfit Double Ferrari.

In the interim years, the band has largely stayed inactive, regrouping on occasion for one-off concerts. In 2018, the quartet celebrated their tenth anniversary as a band with two shows in Athens and Atlanta.

== Band members ==
- Graham Ulicny - vocals, guitar (2009–present)
- Ryan Engelberger - bass (2009–present)
- William Kennedy - keyboards (2009–present)
- Andrew McFarland - drums (2009–present)
- Jace Bartlet - guitar (2012–2014)

== Discography ==
=== Studio albums ===
Title	Album details
Body Faucet	Released: 1 May 2012; Label: Vagrant Records; Formats: CD, LP, digital download
Lurid Glow	Released: 31 March 2015; Label: Joyful Noise Recordings; Formats: CD, LP, cassette, digital download

=== Extended plays ===
Title	EP details
Oblangle Fizz Y'all (EP)	Released: 2 August 2011; Label: Vagrant Records, Make Records Not Bombs, Quality Faucet Records; Formats: CD, digital download, 12" vinyl

=== Singles ===
Year	Title	Label	Album
2010	"Houseboat Babies" / "Cannabis Canyon" (Radio Edit)	Make Records Not Bombs	Non-Album Tracks
2012	"Stuck In My Id"	Lucky Number Music	Oblangle Fizz Y'all (EP)
2015	"In Through The Eyelids" / "Delusional"	Joyful Noise Recordings	Non-Album Single
