= RetroHash =

Studio album by Asher Roth
- Released: April 22, 2014
- Recorded: 2012–2013
- Genre: Progressive hip hop
- Length: 40:39
- Labels: Federal Prism; Pale Fire
- Producers: Asher Roth (exec.); Blended Babies

Asher Roth chronology
Asleep in the Bread Aisle (2009)	RetroHash (2014)	Flowers on the Weekend (2020)

Singles from RetroHash
- 1. "Tangerine Girl" Released: February 26, 2014; 2. "Fast Life" Released: March 25, 2014

RetroHash is the second studio album by American hip hop recording artist Asher Roth. The album was released on April 22, 2014, by Pale Fire and Federal Prism Records. The album was solely produced by American production duo Blended Babies and features guest appearances from ZZ Ward, Currensy, Coyle Girelli, Vic Mensa, Major Myjah and Chuck Inglish.

== Background ==
Asher Roth released his debut studio album in 2009, while signed to Schoolboy, SRC and Universal Motown Records. The album included his hit single "I Love College", which propelled Roth into the mainstream. Roth then went on to release several other projects, including an extended play (EP) titled The Rawth EP (2010), which was a collaboration with American record producer Nottz Raw. On November 18, 2011, senior vice president of Island Def Jam, Shawn "Pecas" Costner, confirmed via Twitter that Roth was the newest member of the Def Jam roster. As a result, rumors quickly spread that Roth was no longer on SRC Records, the label which put out his debut. However, the label's CEO, Steve Rifkind, took to Twitter as well, to clarify that they would be "partnering with Def Jam" on Roth's new release.

In September 2010, Asher Roth had announced his second studio album would be titled The Spaghetti Tree. He had described the sound of the album as "organic". He insisted that the material is grounded in nature and innovation: "The second time around, the sound is esoteric," XXL quotes Roth as saying. "It's spacey. It's dope, though. But it also has this really earthy, organic sound. So, if that even makes any sense, it's kind of the air and the earth." In May 2011, it was reported the album would no longer be titled The Spaghetti Tree. In a September 2011 interview with Rikki Martinez, of Power 106, Asher Roth revealed the new title of his second album to be Is This Too Orange? Roth then explained his inspiration for the album's new title: "I was waking up and it just came to me. It turns out that orange is the color of the creative chakra."

On August 1, 2012, Roth revealed he scrapped the Is This Too Orange? title for his second album, out of respect for his Def Jam label-mate Frank Ocean's debut Channel Orange (2012). On December 17, 2013, Asher Roth hosted a house party at Sonos in Los Angeles, to preview new songs and reveal the album's newest title. The following day, Roth released a video revealing the title to be RetroHash, an anagram of his name. The sunset-lit video-announcement also previews a new song titled "Pot of Gold," which was made available for free downloaded via Roth's official website. In July 2012, in an interview with BroBible, Roth had admitted that he's "growing up" but assured fans that they are his boss and he's working to please: "I'm not trying to pull a fast one on anyone," he said. "I'm just doing stuff that I know is why people fell in love with me in the first place." In July 2013, it was revealed Roth had signed with Federal Prism, the new record label from TV on the Radio‘s Dave Sitek and his partner Jeff Bowers.

In December 2013, in an interview with XXL, when asked what was the inspiration behind the album, Roth answered: "It's a record about freedom. About trusting yourself and being yourself, and I think that's pretty awesome. I want to continue to challenge myself as a songwriter, as well as a person, to just get better."

== Recording and production ==
In a July 2010 XXL article, Roth had revealed four tracks for his second studio album. One was set to feature West Coast rapper Game, one to be produced by Swizz Beatz and another titled "Run it Back". In an October 2010 interview with Vibe, Roth hinted at a few guest features the album would offer, including Robin Thicke and Cannon. In a September 2010 interview with XXL, while the album was still titled The Spaghetti Tree, Roth spoke with DJ Skee, giving some details on the album, including that he's working with a range of producers including Nottz, DJ Khalil, Ryan Leslie, Don Cannon and Oren Yoel, the latter of whom handled the bulk of production on Roth's 2009 debut, Asleep in the Bread Aisle.

In October 2012, Roth revealed he had been listening to "a lot of Paul Simon and R. Kelly", and because of this his new release would offer up a different sound than his previous work. In December 2013, in an interview with XXL, Roth spoke about the sound of the album, saying: "It's wavy, man. It's moody." In a February 2014 interview with Billboard, Roth cited his moving from Philadelphia, Pennsylvania to Los Angeles, California, as a key influence on the "wave" vibe of "RetroHash." During the same interview, Roth revealed collaborations with American singer-songwriter ZZ Ward and fellow American rapper Vic Mensa, the latter on a track titled "Fast Life."

== Release and promotion ==
In October 2010, Roth said he had no plans to rush out his second studio album: "I'm not just trying to put out a song, make quick money and get out of here. I wanna put something together that's gonna last, that people are going to appreciate, listen to and they're going to break it down." On July 27, 2010, Roth released and promoted "G.R.I.N.D (Get Ready It's a New Day)", the first single from his upcoming second album, by traveling to different radio stations around the country. On July 19, 2011, Roth released the album's second single "Last Man Standing", which features singer Akon. The song was later included on the soundtrack to the video game Madden NFL 12. On April 19, 2012, a video teaser for a new Asher Roth single titled "Party Girl", was released. The following day, on April 20, 2012, "Party Girl", a collaboration with fellow Pennsylvania-based rapper Meek Mill, which samples Eddie Murphy's hit single "Party All the Time", was officially released via digital distribution. On April 24, 2012, Roth released another single titled "Gotta Get Up", featuring D.A. of Chester French.

In October 2012, after having announced the scrapping of the Is This Too Orange? title, Roth told MTV his second album was scheduled to be released January 22, 2013, however it was once again delayed. On June 25, 2013, Roth released The Greenhouse Effect Vol. 2, the sequel to his 2008 debut mixtape. A song from the mixtape was later released to iTunes as a single in August. On December 17, 2013, Asher Roth hosted a house party at Sonos in Los Angeles, to reveal the album's newest title. The following day, Roth released a video revealing the title to be RetroHash. The sunset-lit video-announcement also previews a new song titled "Pot of Gold," which was made available for free downloaded via Roth's official website. In a December interview with XXL, Roth stated he did not want to announce a definitive release date, but assured it would be out first quarter of 2014. On February 26, 2014, it was announced that the album would be released on April 22, 2014. On March 5, 2014, Roth unveiled the album's cover art, which was designed by high-profile artist John Van Hamersveld. On March 15, 2014, Roth hosted a "live listening session" of RetroHash at South By Southwest, performing the full album live at the Blackheart Bar with special guests, The Pharcyde. On December 4, 2018, Asher Roth released special autographed vinyl copies of the album.

== Singles ==
On February 26, 2014, Asher Roth released the album's lead single, a song titled "Tangerine Girl". On March 13, 2014, the music video was released for "Tangerine Girl". On March 25, 2014, a song titled "Fast Life", featuring Vic Mensa, was released as the album's second single. "Fast Life" was also made available as a free download to those who pre-ordered the album on iTunes. On July 25, 2014, the music video was released for "Parties at the Disco" featuring ZZ Ward. On August 6, 2014, the music video was released for "Last of the Flohicans" featuring Major Myjah. On September 24, 2014, the music video was released for "Pull It".

== Critical reception ==
Professional ratings
Aggregate scores
Source	Rating
Metacritic	64/100
Review scores
Source	Rating
AllMusic	3.5/5 stars
DJBooth	4/5 stars
HipHopDX	3.5/5 stars
PopMatters	5/10 stars
XXL	(L)

RetroHash was met with generally positive reviews from music critics. At Metacritic, which assigns a normalized rating out of 100 to reviews from critics, the album received an average score of 64, which indicates "generally favorable reviews", based on 4 reviews. Sheldon Pearce of XXL gave the album an L rating, saying "RetroHash is a confused jumble of ideas that has its heart in the right place. Though it fails in its attempt to patch mismatched parts together to form a cohesive product that blankets every single concept the Pennsylvanian MC has ever hoped to explore, it has shining moments that hint at the possibility of great future success. It takes some time to get acclimated to newly held responsibility, and in time perhaps the blips and bumps will be ironed out. Once Asher Roth comes into his own as an artist with free rein to do as he pleases aesthetically, he may find himself browsing some truly fantastic creative space." Andrew Gretchko of HipHopDX said, "While RetroHash seems focused on Roth's reinvention, something that may disappoint those who enjoyed the more familiar lyric-heavy style he displayed on mixtapes like The Greenhouse Effect vol. 2, it may better suit the now-introspective rapper, whose reserved take on his former allegro-style rhyming has been replaced with thoughtful lines that seem to hit at the perfect time." Nathan Stevens of PopMatters said, "Retro Hash is Roth's largest foray into an odder world. Lead single "Tangerine Girl" doesn't even have Roth rapping until the second half. Roth attempts to mix stoner vibes, psychedelic overtones, and the kitchen sink together in a fairly experimental release. It never becomes cohesive enough to be called great, but it's just what Roth needs to distance himself from "I Love College"."

David Jeffries of AllMusic said, "Much smarter and trying harder than previous, RetroHash isn't just admirable, as it's quite awesome in parts, and yet the track list begs to be shuffled, especially the bookending features with Z.Z. Hill (the album seems to emerge from the mist...) and Chuck Inglish (...and then exit like evanescence). Regardless, blunted afternoons of hanging out could use this kind of loose soundtrack, plus anyone who ever used Roth as a punching bag representing pop-rap pap will find no ammo in RetroHash's goopy dollop of sticky icky." Lucas Garrison of DJBooth said, "The album is fun, enjoyable, and well-done, but I'm more excited for what it means moving forward that what it means for the next summer party (although I'm excited for that too). I see the start of a career filled with projects that bend genres and experiment with sounds for better or for worse. The next album might be a little more hip-hop or it might be completely the opposite and I'll enjoy the ride either way. you might not get exactly what you want each time, but I'd rather have that than the alternative; a whole album of "I Love College"."

== Commercial performance ==
The album debuted at number 45 on the Billboard 200 chart, with first-week sales of 6,100 copies in the United States.

== Track listing ==
- All songs produced by Blended Babies.

No.	Title	Length
1.	"Parties at the Disco" (featuring ZZ Ward)	3:35
2.	"Dude" (featuring Curren$y)	3:55
3.	"Tangerine Girl"	4:24
4.	"Pull It"	4:47
5.	"Something for Nothing" (featuring Coyle Girelli)	4:09
6.	"Fast Life" (featuring Vic Mensa)	4:02
7.	"Last of the Flohicans" (featuring Major Myjah)	3:46
8.	"Be Right" (featuring Major Myjah)	4:00
9.	"Pot of Gold"	3:47
10.	"Keep Smoking" (featuring Chuck Inglish)	4:14

== Charts ==
Chart (2014)	Peak position
UK R&B Albums (Official Charts)	28
US Billboard 200	45
US Top R&B/Hip-Hop Albums (Billboard)	12
