= Lovesick (2016 film) =

- Directed by: Tyson Caron
- Written by: Tyson Caron
- Screenplay by: Tyson Caron
- Produced by: Kyle Irving
- Starring: Jacob Tierney; Jessica Paré; Jay Baruchel
- Cinematography: Jonathon Cliff
- Edited by: Bruce Little
- Music by: Matthew Schellenberg
- Production company: Eagle Vision
- Distributed by: Les Films Séville
- Release date: December 2, 2016 (Whistler)
- Running time: 93 minutes
- Country: Canada
- Language: English

Lovesick is a Canadian romantic comedy film, released December 2, 2016. The film has a running time of 93 minutes, and was filmed in various sections of Winnipeg, Manitoba, Canada. Lovesick, was written and directed by Winnipeg filmmaker Tyson Caron, in which he made his directorial debut.

== Plot ==
Dash is a man obsessed with trying to win back his ex-girlfriend Lauren, even though she is now engaged to Mark. Dash enters therapy and seeks counselling from a professional psychologist in order to finally acknowledge his issues at hand. At the hospital, Dash meets Nora, a recovering alcoholic and is exposed to new feelings and is forced to confront whether he really knows what he wants. He is submerged in a constant cycle of unrequited love. He is required to decide what is best for him and make a decision that will ultimately affect the rest of his life.

== Cast ==
- Jacob Tierney as Dash
- Jessica Paré as Lauren
- Jay Baruchel as Mark
- Ali Tataryn as Nora
- Ross McMillan as Dr. Goldberg
- Rebecca Gibson as Bee
- Adam Brooks as Conrad
- Sarah Constible as Mary

== Production ==
This film was produced by the studio company "Eagle Vision" and has not been rated. Matthew Schellenberg of the band Royal Canoe wrote and recorded the film's soundtrack. At the 5th Canadian Screen Awards in 2017, he received a nomination for Best Original Song for "Draw Blood".
