= Do It for Free =

Studio album by the Constellations
- Released: June 12, 2012
- Genre: Soul, hip-hop, rock
- Label: 429 Records

Do It for Free is the second album by Atlanta-based band the Constellations.

== Track listing ==
1. "Black Cat"
2. "Afterparty"
3. "Right Where I Belong"
4. "All My Great Escapes"
5. "Back in Atlanta"
6. "Let It Go"
7. "Do It for Free"
8. "The Ol' Speakeasy"
9. "The Breeze"
10. "April"
11. "Side By Side"
12. "Let's Get Paid
13. "Hallelujah"
