= Something Got Lost Between Here and the Orbit =

Studio album by Royal Canoe
- Released: 11 September 2016
- Genre: Indie Rock
- Length: 47:51
- Label: Nevado Music
- Producer: Ben H. Allen

Royal Canoe chronology
Royal Canoe Does Beck's Song Reader (2014)	Something Got Lost Between Here and the Orbit (2016)	Waver (2019)

Professional ratings
Review scores
Source	Rating
AllMusic	3/5 stars
Exclaim!	8/10

Something Got Lost Between Here and the Orbit is an album by Royal Canoe, released in 2016.

== Critical reception ==
Exclaim! wrote that "there's a complete unpredictability to the movement and execution of their songs here, which often seem temporarily settled, only to then veer off and head for entirely uncharted territory." The Rutland Herald wrote that the album "serves up a winsome sound that’s as sultry, soul-stirring and beautiful as it is funky and dance-inducing."

== Track listing ==
1. "Somersault" – 4:07
2. "Walk out on the Water" – 3:40
3. "Living a Lie" – 4:20
4. "Checkmate" – 3:32
5. "Love You Like That" – 3:57
6. "I am Collapsing so Slowly" – 5:13
7. "Holidays" – 5:26
8. "Out of the Beehive" – 3:36
9. "New Recording 270" – 0:48
10. "Bicycle" – 3:28
11. "How Long Is Your Life" – 5:28
12. "BB Gun" – 4:16

== Personnel ==
- Matt Peters – vocals, keyboard, acoustic guitar
- Bucky Driedger – vocals, electric guitar
- Matt Schellenberg – vocals, keyboard
- Brendan Berg – vocals, bass guitar, keyboard
- Derek Allard – drums
- Michael Jordan – electronic drums
