= High Times (EP) =

EP by Washed Out
- Released: 2009
- Genre: Chillwave
- Length: 19:36
- Label: Mirror Universe Tapes

Washed Out chronology
High Times (2009)	Life of Leisure (2009)

High Times is the debut EP from the Georgia-based artist Washed Out, released in 2009. The EP only had a limited release on cassette tape initially.

On November 2, 2018, the EP was remixed and remastered on vinyl with four previously unreleased tracks.

== Track listing ==
Side A
No.	Title	Length
1.	"Belong"	2:54
2.	"Good Luck"	1:15
3.	"Phone Call"	3:31
4.	"Olivia" (featuring sample of "Lost in the Night" by Costas Charitodiplomenos (1984))	2:19

Side B
No.	Title	Length
1.	"Clap Intro"	1:23
2.	"Luck"	2:12
3.	"It's Kate's Birthday" (featuring sample of "Blowin' Your Mind" by John Schroeder (1972))	2:20
4.	"You Will Be Sad"	1:18
5.	"Yeah"	2:24

2018 remaster bonus tracks
No.	Title	Length
1.	"Don't Wanna"	2:02
2.	"Step Back"	2:35
3.	"La La La La La"	1:57
4.	"Chimes"	2:29
