= Mister Mellow =

Studio album by Washed Out
- Released: June 30, 2017
- Studio: Dead Homies Studio, Los Angeles
- Genre: Chillwave
- Length: 29:25
- Label: Stones Throw
- Producer: Ernest Greene; Cole M.G.N.

Washed Out chronology
Paracosm (2013)	Mister Mellow (2017)	Purple Noon (2020)

Singles from Mister Mellow
- 1. "Get Lost" Released: May 25, 2017; 2. "Hard to Say Goodbye" Released: June 26, 2017

Professional ratings
Aggregate scores
Source	Rating
Metacritic	70/100
Review scores
Source	Rating
AllMusic	3.5/5 stars
The A.V. Club	B
Drowned in Sound	8/10
Exclaim!	7/10
The Guardian	3/5 stars
The Observer	4/5 stars
Pitchfork	6.7/10
Q	3/5 stars
Uncut	8/10
Under the Radar	7/10 stars

Mister Mellow is the third studio album by American singer Washed Out. It was released on June 30, 2017, and is his first project with Stones Throw Records. The CD release is accompanied by a visual album on DVD.

== Track listing ==
All tracks are written by Ernest Greene.

CD
No.	Title	Length
1.	"Title Card"	0:30
2.	"Burn Out Blues"	3:43
3.	"Time Off"	1:01
4.	"Floating By"	3:41
5.	"I've Been Daydreaming My Entire Life"	2:09
6.	"Hard to Say Goodbye"	4:12
7.	"Down and Out"	1:07
8.	"Instant Calm"	2:09
9.	"Zonked"	1:10
10.	"Get Lost"	4:04
11.	"Easy Does It"	0:52
12.	"Million Miles Away"	4:47
Total length:		29:25

DVD
No.	Title	Director	Length
1.	"Title Card"	Eric Coleman (cameraman)	0:45
2.	"Burn Out Blues"	Winston Hacking	3:43
3.	"Time Off"	Ruff Mercy	1:02
4.	"Floating By"	Drew Tyndell	3:42
5.	"I've Been Daydreaming My Entire Life"	Ernest Greene	2:07
6.	"Hard to Say Goodbye"	Jonathan Hodgson	4:13
7.	"Down and Out"	Daniel Brereton; Morph Animation	1:10
8.	"Instant Calm"	Sophia Bennett Holmes	2:08
9.	"Zonked"	Ruff Mercy	1:11
10.	"Get Lost"	Harvey Benschoter	4:05
11.	"Easy Does It"	Parallel Teeth	1:08
12.	"Million Miles Away"	Jason Miller	3:03
Total length:			28:17

== Personnel ==
Credits adapted from the liner notes of Mister Mellow.

CD

- Ernest Greene – art direction, cover, production, recording, vocals
- Constant Artists – management
- Dave Cooley – mastering
- Alexandra Galvillet – inlay photo
- Jeff Jank – design, layout
- Cole M.G.N. – additional production, mixing, recording

DVD

- Ernest Greene – concept, music
- Bráulio Amado – credits, titles
- Jesse Orrall – film editing

== Charts ==
Chart (2017)	Peak position
New Zealand Heatseekers Albums (RMNZ)	9
UK Dance Albums (OCC)	40
US Top Dance Albums (Billboard)	8
