= Royal Canoe =

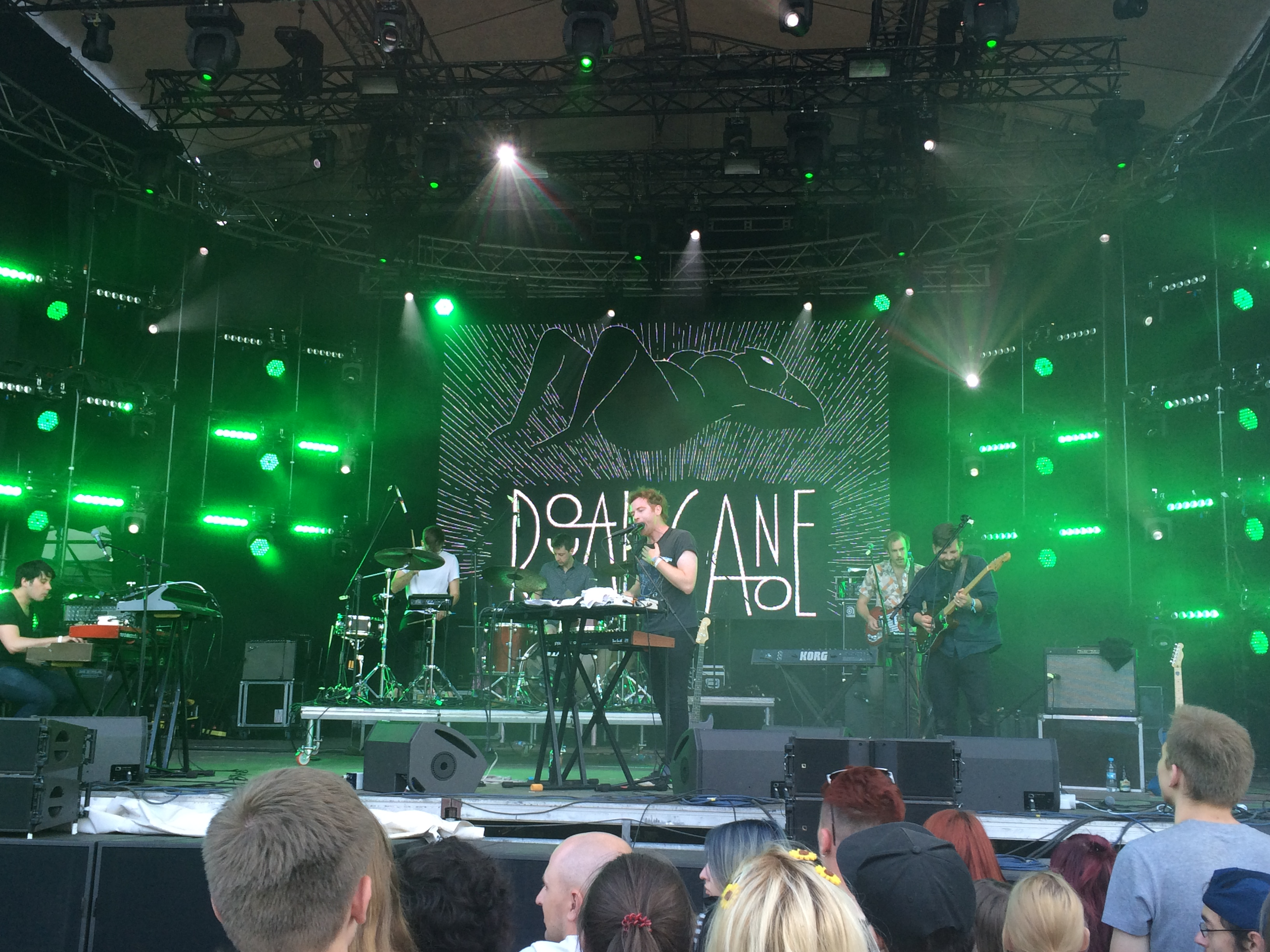
- Royal Canoe performing at Atlas Weekend 2017

Background information
- Origin: Winnipeg, Manitoba, Canada
- Genre: Indie pop
- Years active: 2010–present

Royal Canoe is a Canadian indie pop band from Winnipeg and Steinbach, Manitoba.

== History ==
The band formed in 2010 from members of Manitoba bands The Waking Eyes, The Liptonians and TELE. They have toured with Alt-J and Bombay Bicycle Club. In 2014, Royal Canoe was nominated for Alternative Album of the Year at the Juno Awards. They also opened for Bombay Bicycle Club on their So Long, See You Tomorrow tour.

On 2 February 2013, Royal Canoe performed Beck's Song Reader project in full at the Winnipeg Symphony Orchestra's New Music Festival. (Beck released Song Reader on sheet music without a recorded version.)

On 1 July 2025, bassist Brendan Berg was killed in a car crash along with his partner, Olivia Michalczuk. He was 42.

== Solo projects ==
In 2016, keyboardist Matthew Schellenberg composed, performed and produced songs for the soundtrack to the film Lovesick. At the 5th Canadian Screen Awards in 2017, he received a nomination for Best Original Song for "Draw Blood".

Matt Peters along with Tom Keenan formed the Winnipeg Chamber-pop ensemble Heavy Bell. In January 2018, they released the album By Grand Central Station, a tribute to Canadian author Elizabeth Smart's 1945 novel By Grand Central Station I Sat Down and Wept.

== Members ==
- Matt Peters – Vocals, keyboards, acoustic guitar
- Bucky Driedger – Electric guitar, vocals
- Matt Schellenberg – Keyboards, vocals
- Michael Jordan – Drums

== Former members ==
- Derek Allard – Drums
- Brendan Berg – Bass, keyboards, vocals (died 2025)

== Discography ==
- Co-Op Mode (2010)
- Extended Play EP (2012)
- Purple & Gold 7 inch (2012)
- Today We're Believers (2013)
- Royal Canoe Does Beck's Song Reader (2014)
- Something Got Lost Between Here and the Orbit (2016)
- Waver (2019)
- RC3PO (2019)
- Sidelining (2021)
- Vault (2011 - 2021) (2022) (Compilation album of unreleased demos, B-sides and rareties)
