= Asleep in the Bread Aisle =

Studio album by Asher Roth
- Released: April 20, 2009
- Recorded: 2008–2009
- Genre: Pop rap
- Length: 47:31
- Labels: Schoolboy; SRC; Universal Motown
- Producers: Oren Yoel; David Appleton; Don Cannon; Nottz; Ben H. Allen; Novel; Mike Caren

Asher Roth chronology
Asleep in the Bread Aisle (2009)	RetroHash (2014)

Singles from Asleep in the Bread Aisle
- 1. "I Love College" Released: January 13, 2009; 2. "Lark on My Go-Kart" Released: March 24, 2009; 3. "Be by Myself" Released: May 5, 2009; 4. "She Don't Wanna Man" Released: July 7, 2009

Asleep in the Bread Aisle is the debut studio album by American rapper Asher Roth. It was released on April 20, 2009, by SRC Records, Schoolboy Records and Universal Motown Records. The production on the album was largely contributed by Oren Yoel, while the album features guest appearances from CeeLo Green, Busta Rhymes, Keri Hilson, Jazze Pha, pop duo Chester French, and the hip hop group New Kingdom.

The album received a mixed response from critics, with reviews divided by Yoel's production clashing with Roth's delivery of hip hop party clichés. Asleep in the Bread Aisle debuted at number 5 on the US Billboard 200, while it was supported by all 4 singles; "I Love College", "Lark on My Go-Kart", "Be by Myself" and "She Don't Wanna Man".

== Background ==
On Asleep in the Bread Aisle was known for the contributions from its producers, such as Don Cannon, along with newcomer Oren Yoel, who crafted the bulk of the album's beats. The album features guest appearances from Cee-Lo Green, Jazze Pha, Keri Hilson, Busta Rhymes, pop duo Chester French, and hip hop group New Kingdom from Los Angeles. During the recording sessions, Jazze Pha was at the downstairs recording in the same studio, and then he went upstairs to check things out, which ended up providing some vocals for the track, titled "Bad Day". The album carries a PA label but there is no actual Parental Advisory sticker on the album cover. Instead, the PA warning is hand-drawn over the cover like the rest of the text.

== Singles ==
The album's lead single was "I Love College", which also serves as Roth's commercial debut single. It was released on January 13, 2009. The second single as part of the promotion for the album was "Lark on My Go-Kart". It was released on March 24, 2009.

The album's third single, "Be by Myself" featuring the guest vocals from American singer-songwriter Cee-Lo Green, was released on May 5, 2009. The album's fourth single, "She Don't Wanna Man" was released on July 7, 2009.

== Commercial performance ==
Asleep in the Bread Aisle debuted at number 5 on the US Billboard 200, with nearly 65,000 copies sold in its first week. As of February 2014, the album has sold 214,000 copies in the United States, according to Nielsen SoundScan. In April 2019, the album was officially certified gold for selling an excess of 500,000 copies.

== Critical reception ==
Professional ratings
Aggregate scores
Source	Rating
Metacritic	56/100
Review scores
Source	Rating
AllMusic	3/5 stars
Blender	3/5 stars
The Boston Globe	favorable
The Guardian	2/5 stars
HipHopDX	2/5 stars
RapReviews	(7.5/10)
Rolling Stone	3/5 stars
Vibe	2.5/5 stars
XXL	(XL)
PopMatters	(3/10)

Upon its release, Asleep in the Bread Aisle was met with mixed reviews from music critics. According to Billboard, Oren Yoel's "mixture of boom-bap drums and pop sensibility mixes well with Roth's happy go lucky and sincere rhymes". Rolling Stone similarly complimented Roth for his sincerity and avoiding the cliche gimmicks typically employed by fellow white rappers, saying, "Roth's tight, witty debut lives up to the Internet hype that has swirled around him for months... he keeps the nerd-boy self-deprecation to a minimum and acts, you know, like a rapper." However, AllMusic noted, "Smoking weed, having sex, and swearing is hardly riveting material, and when Asher can't turn these topics into something clever, it becomes tiresome." HipHopDX agreed saying, "...Roth makes partying sound like the most boring thing in the world. It’s not that having fun in college is not worthy of being rapped about, it’s that Roth seems absolutely incapable of approaching this topic with anything remotely close to creativity or humor." Alan Ranta of PopMatters summarized by saying Asleep in the Bread Aisle was "a brainless summer record with flashes of conscience. Roth can do better or, at the very least, discover his own voice."

== Track listing ==
No.	Title	Writer(s)	Producer(s)	Length
1.	"Lark on My Go-Kart"	Asher Roth; Oren Kleinman; David Appleton; Gary Grice	Oren Yoel; Appleton	2:54
2.	"Blunt Cruisin'"	Roth; Kleinman; Edip Akbayram	Oren Yoel	3:36
3.	"I Love College"	Roth; Mike Caren; Ben H. Allen III; Kirk Robinson; Nat Robinson; Lana Moorer; Rivers Cuomo; Patrick Wilson; Brian Bell; Scott Shriner	Caren; Ben H. Allen III (co.)	4:01
4.	"La Di Da"	Roth; Don Cannon	Don Cannon	3:47
5.	"Be by Myself" (featuring Cee-Lo Green)	Roth; Kleinman	Oren Yoel	4:22
6.	"She Don't Wanna Man"	Roth; Kleinman	Oren Yoel	3:36
7.	"Sour Patch Kids"	Roth; Kleinman	Oren Yoel	4:29
8.	"As I Em" (featuring Chester French)	Roth; Appleton; Kleinman; David-Andrew Wallach; Joe Jackson	Oren Yoel; Appleton	4:19
9.	"Lion's Roar" (featuring Busta Rhymes and New Kingdom)	Roth; Kleinman; Noah King; Trevor Smith	Oren Yoel	4:12
10.	"Bad Day" (featuring Jazze Pha)	Roth; Appleton; Kleinman	Oren Yoel; Appleton	3:37
11.	"His Dream"	Roth; Kleinman; Miguel Pimentel	Oren Yoel	4:35
12.	"Fallin'"	Roth; Tony Reyes; Alonzo Stevenson; Ben Kweller; Bill Withers	Novel	4:12

iTunes Store bonus tracks
No.	Title	Writer(s)	Producer(s)	Length
13.	"Perfectionist" (featuring Beanie Sigel and Rock City)	Roth; Kleinman; Appleton; Theron Thomas; Timothy Thomas; Dwight Grant	Oren Yoel; Appleton	3:51
14.	"The Lounge"	Roth	Novel	4:15

United Kingdom bonus track
No.	Title	Writer(s)	Producer(s)	Length
15.	"Y.O.U." (featuring Slick Rick)	Roth; Dominick "Nottz" Lamb; Ricky Walters	Nottz	3:53

Notes

- (co.) denotes co-producer.
- "She Don't Wanna Man" features an uncredited vocals by Keri Hilson.

Sample credits

- "Lark on My Go Kart" contains a sample of "Swordsman" performed by GZA.
- "Blunt Cruisin'" contains a sample of "Kukredi Cimenler" performed by Edip Akbayram.
- "I Love College" contains a samples from "Say It Ain't So" performed by Weezer, "Impeach the President" performed by the Honey Drippers and "10% Diss" performed by MC Lyte.
- "As I Em" contains a sample of "Geraldine and John" performed by Joe Jackson
- "Fallin'" contains a sample of "Falling" performed by Ben Kweller and "Kissing My Love" performed by Bill Withers
- "Y.O.U." contains a sample of "You Are You" performed by The Original Cast of "Flora the Red Menace".

== Charts ==
=== Weekly charts ===
Chart (2009)	Peak position
Canadian Albums (Nielsen SoundScan)	31
German Albums (Offizielle Top 100)	87
Scottish Albums (Official Charts)	55
UK Albums (Official Charts)	38
UK R&B Albums (Official Charts)	4
US Billboard 200	5
US Indie Store Album Sales (Billboard)	4
US Top R&B/Hip-Hop Albums (Billboard)	5
US Top Rap Albums (Billboard)	3

=== Year-end charts ===
Chart (2009)	Position
US Top R&B/Hip-Hop Albums (Billboard)	89
