= Notes from a Quiet Life =

2024 studio album by Washed Out

Studio album by Washed Out
- Released: June 28, 2024
- Label: Sub Pop

Washed Out chronology
Purple Noon (2020)	Notes from a Quiet Life (2024)

Notes from a Quiet Life is the fifth studio album by American singer-songwriter Washed Out, released on June 28, 2024 by Sub Pop. It is the first full album to be fully produced by Washed Out.

== Reception ==
Notes from a Quiet Life received average-to-favorable reviews, with critics noting the departure from the chillwave of prior releases by Washed Out.

== Track listing ==
All tracks are written by Ernest Greene.

No.	Title	Length
1.	"Waking Up"	4:39
2.	"Say Goodbye"	4:35
3.	"Got Your Back"	4:14
4.	"Hardest Part"	4:05
5.	"Sign"	3:21
6.	"Second Sight"	3:42
7.	"Running Away"	3:58
8.	"Wait on You"	2:56
9.	"Wondrous Life"	4:03
10.	"Letting Go"	4:28
Total length:		40:05
