= G.R.I.N.D (Get Ready It's a New Day) =

Single by Asher Roth
- Released: July 26, 2010
- Genre: Hip-hop
- Length: 3:38
- Label: Schoolboy; SRC; Universal Motown
- Songwriters: Asher Roth; Lamar Edwards; Larrance Dopson
- Producer: 1500 or Nothin'

Asher Roth singles chronology
"She Don't Wanna Man" (2009)	"G.R.I.N.D (Get Ready It's a New Day)" (2010)

Music video
- "G.R.I.N.D (Get Ready It's a New Day)" on YouTube

"G.R.I.N.D (Get Ready It's a New Day)" is a song by American rapper Asher Roth. The song was released to radio on July 26, 2010 and as a digital download on July 27, 2010. The song was initially meant to be the lead single for his second studio album, then-titled The Spaghetti Tree.

== Music video ==
The music video was released on September 20, 2010. It was filmed and directed by Marc Klasfeld, a well known music video director. During the video, the setting changes from black and white to full color.

== Track listing ==
Digital single

No.	Title	Writer(s)	Producer(s)	Length
1.	"G.R.I.N.D (Get Ready It's a New Day)"	Asher Roth, Lamar Edwards, Larrance Dopson	1500 or Nothin	3:38

== Release history ==
Country	Date	Format	Label
United States	July 27, 2010	Digital download	Schoolboy, SRC, Universal Motown

=== Chart performance ===
Chart (2010)	Peak position
Canada (Canadian Hot 100)	67
US Billboard Hot 100	79
