= Body Faucet =

Studio album by Reptar
- Released: May 1, 2012
- Recorded: 56:15
- Genres: Alternative rock; dance-rock; indietronica
- Label: Vagrant Records

Reptar chronology
Oblangle Fizz Y'all (EP) (2011)	Body Faucet (2012)	Lurid Glow (2015)

Professional ratings
Aggregate scores
Source	Rating
Metacritic	51/100
Review scores
Source	Rating
Allmusic	3.5/5 stars
Consequence of Sound	3/5 stars
The Guardian	1/5 stars
NME	6/10 stars
Paste Magazine	8/10
Pitchfork Media	3.0/10
PopMatters	6/10 stars

Body Faucet is the debut studio album by Georgia-based alternative band Reptar, released on May 1, 2012.

== Critical reception ==
Body Faucet received mixed reviews from music critics. At Metacritic, which assigns a normalized rating out of 100 to reviews from mainstream critics, the album received an aggregated score of 51/100, which indicates "mixed or average reviews", based on 12 reviews. In a positive review, Chrysta Cherrie of Allmusic wrote that "Reptar aren't just fluffy fun; beneath their shimmering synths and hard-driving beats are stories of identity and relationships, forming connections not only on the dancefloor but in the heart." Alex Young at Consequence of Sound felt that the band's live performances were not captured with the same energy on the album: "While Body Faucet should be a warm and joyous album, it’s rather dry and airless instead."

"Body Faucet's laudably disrespectful hijack of the last decade’s most revered sounds (think Vampire Weekend if they weren't so pleased with themselves) is both sublime and ridiculous – often at the same time," wrote Edward Thomas of NME. Rebecca Nicholson of The Guardian gave the record one star, opining that, "It's not so much that the songs lack shape, it's that this suggests Reptar lack conviction – every song borrows from something else, something vaguely similar but different enough to make this an incoherent mess, albeit one with oddball pretensions." Ian Cohen of Pitchfork Media panned the album, deriding the band as "accessible to way more information than they can fully process, desperate for attention, and prone to the most public of embarrassments."

Ryan Reed of Paste felt it better than the group's debut EP: "Body Faucet is an improvement over Oblangle in nearly every respect, but it’s definitely not as surprising as that lovely little EP [...] That being said, what they lose in unpredictability they gain in consistency and muscle." of PopMatters felt the opposite: "Although Body Faucet is certainly entertaining throughout, it isn’t hard to imagine that the band spent more time naming the record and some of its songs [...] than attempting to perfect the many pop hooks found on the group’s 2011 debut EP, Oblangle Fizz Y’all, which, even after several listens of Body Faucet, will stand up as the stronger release."

== Track listing ==
No.	Title	Length
1.	"Sebastian"	4:27
2.	"Please Don't Kill Me"	3:49
3.	"Isoprene Bath"	5:10
4.	"Orifice Origami"	4:03
5.	"Houseboat Babies"	5:22
6.	"Natural Bridge"	4:04
7.	"Ghost Bike"	5:17
8.	"New House"	3:07
9.	"Thank You Gliese 370b"	4:38
10.	"Sweet Sipping Soda"	5:43
11.	"Three Shining Suns"	5:22
12.	"Water Runs"	5:13

Bonus tracks
No.	Title	Length
13.	"City Of Habits"	5:37

== Personnel ==
Reptar

- Ryan Engelberger
- William Kennedy
- Andrew McFarland
- Graham Ulicny

Additional musicians

- Damian Dominguez – Saxophone
- Joe Gransden – Trumpet
- Kevin Lyons – Trombone
- James Pannell – Trombone
- Will Scruggs – Saxophone
- Josh Spilliards – Tuba
- Andrew Zimdars – Trumpet
- Caroline Bozeman – Backing vocals
- Sabra Cordery – Backing vocals
- Sarah Dodge – Backing vocals
- Katherine Kennedy – Backing vocals
- Catherine Quesenberry – Backing vocals
- Jess Smith – Backing vocals
- Elizabeth Turner – Backing vocals

== In popular culture ==
- "Sweet Sipping Soda" is featured on the soundtrack of FIFA 13.
