= Paracosm (Washed Out album) =

2013 studio album by Washed Out

Studio album by Washed Out
- Released: August 7, 2013
- Studio: Maze (Atlanta)
- Genres: Synth-pop; soft rock; psychedelic pop
- Length: 41:00
- Label: Sub Pop
- Producers: Ben H. Allen; Ernest Greene

Washed Out chronology
Within and Without (2011)	Paracosm (2013)	Mister Mellow (2017)

Singles from Paracosm
- 1. "It All Feels Right" Released: June 11, 2013

Professional ratings
Aggregate scores
Source	Rating
Metacritic	73/100
Review scores
Source	Rating
AllMusic	4.5/5 stars
The A.V. Club	B
Drowned in Sound	8/10
Filter	88%
The Guardian	4/5 stars
Pitchfork	7.4/10
PopMatters	7/10
Rolling Stone	3.5/5 stars
Slant Magazine	4/5 stars
Spin	6/10

Paracosm is the second studio album by American singer Washed Out, released on August 7, 2013, by Sub Pop. It was produced by Washed Out and Ben H. Allen and was recorded at Maze Studios in Atlanta.

"It All Feels Right" was released as the album's lead single on June 11, 2013. Upon release, the album received mostly positive reviews from critics. The album debuted at number 21 on the Billboard 200, selling 13,000 copies in its first week.

== Track listing ==
All tracks are written by Ernest Greene.

Paracosm – standard edition
No.	Title	Length
1.	"Entrance"	1:21
2.	"It All Feels Right"	4:05
3.	"Don't Give Up"	3:54
4.	"Weightless"	4:55
5.	"All I Know"	5:26
6.	"Great Escape"	5:06
7.	"Paracosm"	6:32
8.	"Falling Back"	5:46
9.	"All Over Now"	3:55
Total length:		41:00

Paracosm – iTunes Store and Japanese edition bonus track
No.	Title	Length
10.	"Pull You Down"	4:13
Total length:		45:13

Paracosm – limited-edition bonus 7-inch vinyl
No.	Title	Length
1.	"Pull You Down"	4:13
2.	"Exit"	2:00

== Personnel ==
- Ernest Greene – vocals (tracks 2–9); production (all tracks); recording (tracks 1–8); art direction
- Ben H. Allen – production, guitar, synths, bass, percussion (all tracks); mixing, recording (tracks 1–8)
- Sumner Jones – recording (tracks 1–8)
- Jason Kingsland – recording, mixing (track 9)
- Bradley Hagen – drums
- Robby Handley – bass (tracks 2, 6, 7)
- Matt Stoessel – pedal steel (track 7)
- Sara Cwynar – floral collage
- Shae DeTar – inside photo
- Sasha Barr – design
- Jeff Kleinsmith – design

== Charts ==
Chart performance for Paracosm
Chart (2013)	Peak position
Australian Hitseekers Albums (ARIA)	7
UK Albums (Official Charts)	101
UK Independent Albums (Official Charts)	21
US Billboard 200	21
US Independent Albums (Billboard)	3
US Top Alternative Albums (Billboard)	3
US Top Rock Albums (Billboard)	5

== Release history ==
Release history for Paracosm
Region	Date	Label	Ref.
Japan	August 7, 2013	Yoshimoto R and C	
Australia	August 9, 2013	Pod	
Germany	August 9, 2013	Domino	
United Kingdom	August 12, 2013	Weird World	
United States	August 13, 2013	Sub Pop	
