= Flowers on the Weekend =

Studio album by Asher Roth
- Released: April 23, 2020
- Recorded: 2016–2020
- Genre: Hip hop
- Length: 32:02
- Label: Retrohash LLC
- Producer: Rob Deckhart

Asher Roth chronology
RetroHash (2014)	Flowers on the Weekend (2020)

Singles from Flowers on the Weekend
- 1. "Mommydog" Released: September 14, 2018; 2. "Hunnid" Released: April 16, 2020; 3. "Way More Fun" Released: April 22, 2020

Flowers on the Weekend is the third studio album by American hip hop recording artist Asher Roth. The album was released on April 23, 2020, on his own Retrohash LLC label. It was produced by Rob Deckhart and features guest appearances from Lil Yachty, Gaby Duran, CJ Smith, Joyce Wrice, Buddy and Iojii.

== Singles ==
The first single was "Mommydog", featuring CJ Smith, released in 2018. The second single "Hunnid", featuring Joyce Wrice, was released in April 2020. A video for the album's third single "Way More Fun" featuring Lil Yachty was released on YouTube on August 6, 2020. Roth said in an interview that Yachty "was the only person" he thought worked for the "Way More Fun" record.

== Critical reception ==
Professional ratings
Review scores
Source	Rating
HipHopDX	2.9/5
Pitchfork	2.9/10

The album received predominantly negative reviews from music critics. Bernadette Giacomazzo of HipHopDX said that Roth "seems entirely out of his league" in attempting to tackle serious subjects, and "while he hits the mark on more than a few occasions, he falls disastrously short on more than a few others". However, "Way More Fun" and "Hibiscus" were singled out for praise, and Giacomazzo concluded that "Flowers on the Weekend, overall, is an interesting listen, if nothing else." Dani Blum of Pitchfork was more critical, stating that it was hard to take Roth's newfound political commitment seriously, and that the album's "most firm commitment is to bludgeoning language and logic". Blum stated that "the production alternates between grating open-mic-night theatrics – clanging cymbals, cloying bursts of trumpet, audible whoops – and plodding drums" and that the songs were "frictionless and forgettable".

== Track listing ==
No.	Title	Writer(s)	Length
1.	"Things Change"	Asher Roth	3:06
2.	"Flowers on the Weekend"	Roth	2:32
3.	"Way More Fun" (featuring Lil Yachty)	Roth; Lil Yachty	2:25
4.	"Hibiscus" (featuring Gaby Duran & CJ Smith)	Roth; Gaby Duran; CJ Smith	3:00
5.	"Still Got Some"	Roth	2:55
6.	"Hunnid" (featuring Joyce Wrice)	Roth; Joyce Wrice	3:14
7.	"In Between"	Roth	2:39
8.	"Spaceship" (featuring Buddy)	Roth; Buddy	2:52
9.	"Dark Chocolate"	Roth	2:30
10.	"Cher in Chernobyl" (featuring Iojii)	Roth; Iojii	3:14
11.	"Back of the Class"	Roth	3:03
12.	"Mommydog" (featuring CJ Smith)	Roth; Smith	2:50
