= GGOOLLDD =

American electropop band

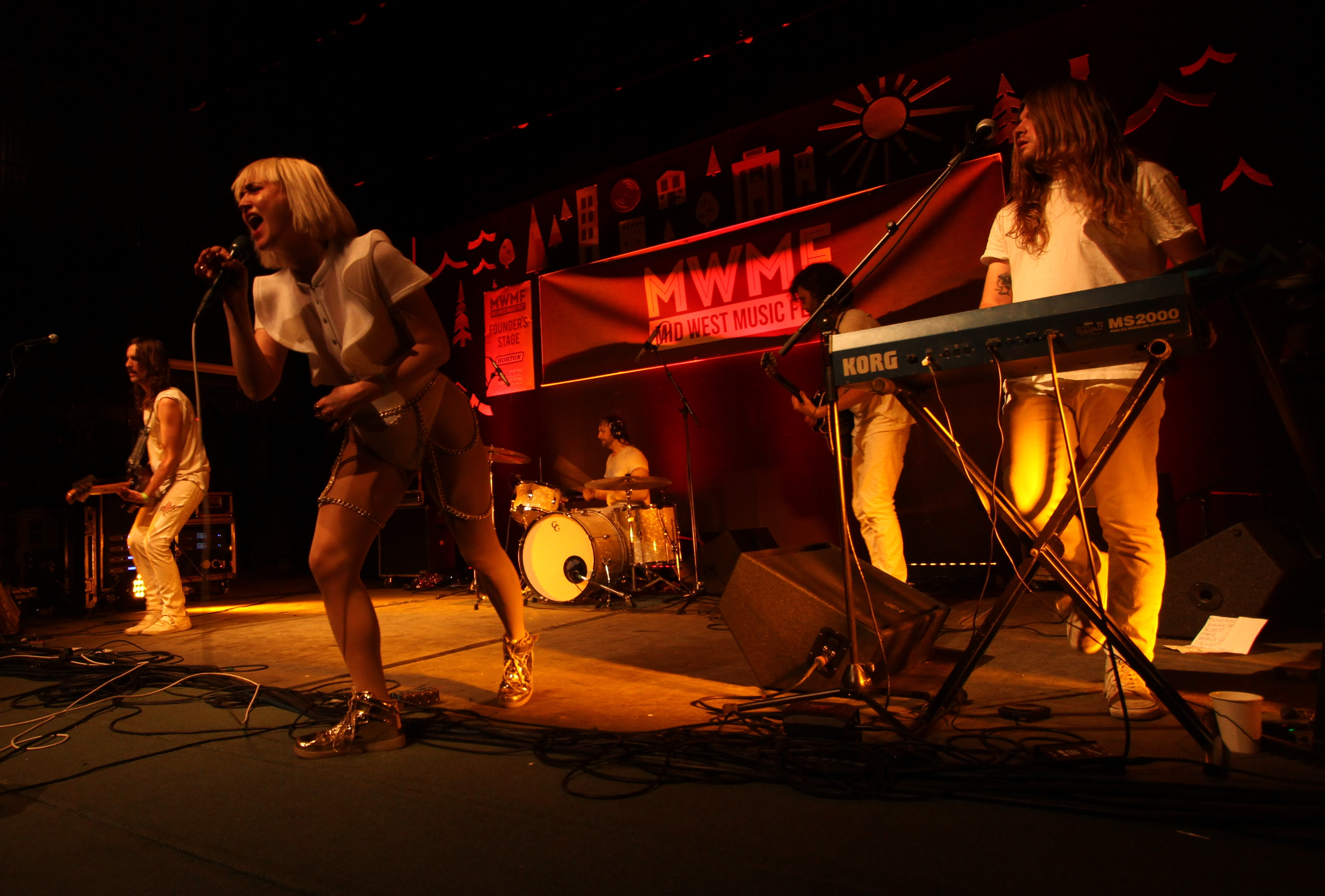
- GGOOLLDD at the 2018 Mid West Music Fest in Winona, Minnesota

Background information
- Origin: Milwaukee, Wisconsin
- Years active: 2013–2022
- Members: Margaret Butler; Nicholas Schubert; Nicholas Ziemann
- Past members: Thomas Gilbert; Tony Hunt; Alex Jannke; Alex Lichtenstein; Mark Stewart
- Website: www.ggoollddband.com

GGOOLLDD was an American electropop band from Milwaukee, Wisconsin with music similar to Chvrches, Ladytron, Haerts, and M83. The band is known for its catchy lyrics, showmanship, and lead singer Margaret Butler's unique sense of style and stage presence.

== History ==
In 2013 Margaret Butler (vocalist) met Tony Hunt (guitar/keys) in the club Tonic where future GGOOLLDD bassist Nick Ziemann was a bartender. Hunt gave Butler a track he had been working on that evening and later Butler penned a few words to the first song, "Gold", which was finished within the week. The name "Gold" seemed like a choice name for a band, but GGOOLLDD was a name that could easily be found by a web search, and thus, the band was formed.

GGOOLLDD began with the release of an EP titled $TANDARD$ in 2014. GGOOLLDD released their first full-length compilation album in 2015 titled Gold+.

In January 2016, Hunt split from the group due to differences in the creative direction according to Butler and the remaining band members. Butler says of the split, "we all grew tired of it not being a group effort. I think (the songs were) getting too commercial, too cotton candy. And the five of us agree we like the pop world and the electro vibe in there, but we also really appreciate some grit and dirt and rock 'n' roll." A few months later in April, GGOOLLDD released their second EP titled For The Night, which Hunt produced but left after.

In late 2016, GGOOLLDD released a song titled Undercovers. In December 2017 the band released the EP Teeth including the track Undercovers.

By 2019, the band had trimmed down to a 3-piece, and Nick & Margaret moved to Baton Rouge, LA. During the coronavirus pandemic of 2020, they wrote and recorded the track Long Distance Pandemic for the Song Confessional podcast. They also appeared as guests on the podcast.

After a decidedly cool public reaction to their 2022 singles, GGOOLLDD decided to quietly call it quits late that year.

== Lyrics and influences ==
GGOOLLDD's lyrics have been described as "youthful and charismatic". Butler describes her lyrics making the point that "we’re all okay, we all love, we all hurt, and sometimes people suck and want to bring us down. But the important thing is that I love you, and a lot of great people love you, and you are gunna make it through whatever comes your way." Margaret further states, "I’m giving you the stuff that makes me happy in hopes that it will make you happy. Definitely, we dabbled in a more commercial sound for a hot second because, you know, we were a new band trying new things but we quickly learned that is not us."

In 2015 Hunt said the band often wrote about "being accepted and being okay with your own voice." There are also references to growing older, some darker thoughts, and references to recent events. Hunt states, "Gold, is a gay rights anthem to us; it grew into that while it was being written. With the Supreme Court ruling, I hope its message is even more apparent. Margaret even has 'love wins' tattooed on her, it was just such a cool thing for all of us when that happened, and to play Summerfest that very day to a couple thousand people and see everyone unite and dance and cheer, very humbling."

== Band members ==
=== Current ===
- Margaret Butler - lead vocal (co-founder)
- Nicholas Schubert - keys
- Nicholas Ziemann - bass guitar

=== Former ===
- Thomas Gilbert - guitar
- Tony Hunt - guitar, keys (co-founder)
- Alex Jannke - drums
- Alex Lichtenstein - guitar
- Mark Stewart - drums

== Discography ==
=== Compilation albums ===
- Gold+ 12" (2015) 500 copies on 12" blue vinyl

=== EPs ===
- $TANDARD$ (2014) digital-only
- For The Night (2016) 500 copies on 12" clear vinyl / cassette / digital
- Teeth (2017) 500 copies on 12" vinyl (100 splatter, 100 pink, 300 cream) / cassette / CD / digital

=== LPs ===
- Here We Are (2020)

=== Singles ===
- Boyz (2015) cassette / digital
- Undercovers (2016) digital-only, promotional cassingle given away at shows in Chicago and Milwaukee
- Long Distance Pandemic (2020) digital, made for Song Confessional podcast
