= Life of Leisure =

EP by Washed Out
- Released: September 8, 2009
- Genres: Chillwave; synth-pop; dream pop; vaporwave
- Length: 17:33
- Label: Mexican Summer

Washed Out chronology
High Times (2009)	Life of Leisure (2009)	Within and Without (2011)

Life of Leisure is an extended play (EP) by American singer-songwriter and record producer Washed Out. Released on September 8, 2009, by Mexican Summer. It is the second EP that the artist has produced, the first being High Times the same year.

== Reception ==
Professional ratings
Review scores
Source	Rating
Pitchfork	8.0/10

Pitchfork's Marc Hogan gave the EP an 8 and stated that "Washed Out, the solo project of Georgia (via South Carolina) multi-instrumentalist Ernest Greene, fits in almost too well with the balmy lo-fi synth atmospherics of peers like Neon Indian, Toro Y Moi, Small Black, the higher-fi jj, or the darker, heavier SALEM, as well as the more guitar-based Real Estate, Best Coast, and Pearl Harbour. Washed Out's debut Life of Leisure EP isn't at the top of its class, but Greene so far is one of this fledgling aesthetic's most gifted students."

The song "Feel It All Around" was released as a single, which became a definitive song of the chillwave genre and appeared on many best-of-2009 lists, including those from Pitchfork and NME.

== In popular culture ==
- "Feel It All Around" is featured in a Proenza Schouler campaign video for the Fall of 2010.
- "Feel It All Around" is also featured as the opening theme for TV series Portlandia on IFC.

== Track listing ==
No.	Title	Length
1.	"Get Up"	3:01
2.	"New Theory"	2:52
3.	"Hold Out"	3:29
4.	"Feel It All Around"	3:16
5.	"Lately"	2:02
6.	"You'll See It"	2:55
Total length:		17:33

== Samples ==
- "Get Up" contains a sample of "Got To Get Up" (1983) by Change
- "New Theory" contains a sample of "Feel It" (1980) by Revelation
- "Hold Out" contains a sample of "West Coast Drive" (1975) by V.I.P. Connection
- "Feel It All Around" contains a sample of "I Want You" (1983) by Gary Low

== See also ==
- 2009 in music
- Indie pop
- Vaporwave
