= Lark on My Go-Kart =

Single by Asher Roth

from the album Asleep in the Bread Aisle
- Released: March 24, 2009
- Genre: Alternative hip hop
- Length: 2:55
- Label: Schoolboy; SRC; Universal Motown
- Songwriters: Asher Roth; Oren Kleinman; David Appleton; Gary Grice
- Producers: Oren Yoel; David Appleton

Asher Roth singles chronology
"I Love College" (2009)	"Lark on My Go-Kart" (2009)	"Be by Myself" (2009)

"Lark on My Go-Kart" is a song by American rapper Asher Roth, released on March 24, 2009, as the second single from his debut studio album Asleep In the Bread Aisle. The song was produced by Oren Yoel and David Appleton.

== Music video ==
The music video was directed by Ryan Maloney. The video is animated, featuring an animated Asher doing various things mentioned in the lyrics, such as driving a go-kart, playing Mario Kart Wii, smashing pumpkins, hanging out at the bread aisle, etc.

== Charts ==
Chart (2009)	Peak position
U.S. Billboard Hot 100	95
