= Feel It All Around =

2009 song by Washed Out

Single by Washed Out

from the album Life of Leisure
- Released: July 2009
- Genre: Chillwave
- Length: 3:12
- Label: None (self-released)
- Songwriter: Ernest Greene
- Producer: Ernest Greene

Washed Out singles chronology
"You'll See It" (2009)	"Feel It All Around" (2009)	"Eyes Be Closed" (2011)

"Feel It All Around"

"Feel It All Around" is a song by the American musician Washed Out. It was first released in July 2009. Later that year, it appeared on his debut EP Life of Leisure and received a vinyl release. It samples the 1983 song "I Want You" by Italian singer Gary Low.

"Feel It All Around" became Washed Out's breakout song, and is generally regarded as the definitive chillwave track. It is considered the most popular example of a chillwave song and set the template for the genre. Pitchfork named it "Best New Track" and later listed it as the 10th best song of 2009, while NME ranked it as the 36th best song of 2009. It received even more recognition when it was used as the opening theme song for the surreal comedy series Portlandia (2011–2018).

== Chart performance ==
Chart performance for "Feel It All Around"
Chart (2010)	Peak position
Mexico Ingles Airplay (Billboard)	13

== Certifications ==
Certifications for "Feel It All Around"
Region	Certification	Certified units/sales
United States (RIAA)	Platinum	1,000,000^{‡}
^{‡} Sales+streaming figures based on certification alone.
