= Purple Noon (album) =

Studio album by Washed Out
- Released: August 7, 2020
- Genre: Chillwave
- Length: 42:20
- Label: Sub Pop
- Producers: Ben H. Allen; Ernest Greene

Washed Out chronology
Mister Mellow (2017)	Purple Noon (2020)	Notes from a Quiet Life (2024)

Singles from Purple Noon
- 1. "Face Up" Released: April 4, 2018; 2. "Too Late" Released: April 9, 2020; 3. "Time to Walk Away" Released: June 30, 2020

Professional ratings
Aggregate scores
Source	Rating
Metacritic	63/100
Review scores
Source	Rating
AllMusic	3/5 stars
Clash	7/10 stars
DIY	3.5/5 stars
Exclaim!	7/10 stars
The Guardian	3/5 stars
The Line of Best Fit	6/10 stars
Paste	5.5/10 stars
Pitchfork	5.8/10
PopMatters	7/10
Under the Radar	7/10

Purple Noon is the fourth studio album by American singer Washed Out, released on August 7, 2020, by Sub Pop. It was produced by Washed Out and Ben H. Allen.

"Face Up", the album's lead single, was released on April 4, 2018, originally as part of Adult Swim's Singles Series. "Too Late" was released as the album's second single on April 9, 2020. The title, artwork, track listing and release date of the album were announced along with the release of a third single, "Time to Walk Away", on June 30, 2020.

== Critical reception ==
Purple Noon received generally positive reviews, with a normalized score of 63 out of 100 on review aggregation site Metacritic. In a positive review of the album, Alex Hudson of Canadian entertainment publisher Exclaim! wrote that on Purple Noon, Washed Out "flirts with the chillwave sounds he's known for without too blatantly repeating himself." Writing for Under the Radar magazine, Scott Elingburg felt that Washed Out "sounds more assured and more interested in stretching his abilities as a singer to accompany his electro pop soundscapes," but described some of the lyrical content as clichéd. Zach Schonfeld of Paste magazine was critical of the album's direction, writing that "there’s nothing here that complicates or advances Greene’s sound, nothing that particularly stands out from the agreeably monotonous haze."

== Track listing ==
All tracks are written by Ernest Greene.

No.	Title	Length
1.	"Too Late"	4:12
2.	"Face Up"	4:08
3.	"Time to Walk Away"	4:15
4.	"Paralyzed"	3:21
5.	"Reckless Desires"	4:24
6.	"Game of Chance"	4:11
7.	"Leave You Behind"	3:52
8.	"Don't Go"	5:20
9.	"Hide"	3:27
10.	"Haunt"	5:10
Total length:		42:20

Japanese edition bonus tracks
No.	Title	Length
11.	"Pigments"
12.	"Rain Arp"

== Personnel ==
Credits adapted from the liner notes of Purple Noon.

- Ernest Greene – vocals (all tracks); production (all tracks); recording (all tracks); art direction
- Ben H. Allen – mixing; production
- Harold "HB" Brown – drums ("Too Late", "Time to Walk Away", "Paralyzed", "Leave You Behind", "Don't Go")
- Blair Greene – photography
- Dylan Lee – acoustic guitar ("Game of Chance")
- Lanning Sally – design

== Charts ==
Chart performance for Purple Noon
Chart (2020)	Peak position
US Independent Albums (Billboard)	35
US Top Alternative Albums (Billboard)	16
US Top Rock Albums (Billboard)	33

== Release history ==
Release history for Purple Noon
Region	Date	Label	Ref.
Various	August 7, 2020	Sub Pop	
