= I Love College =

2009 single by Asher Roth

Single by Asher Roth

from the album Asleep in the Bread Aisle
- Released: January 13, 2009
- Recorded: 2008
- Genre: Pop rap; hip hop
- Length: 4:06
- Label: Schoolboy; SRC; Universal Motown
- Songwriters: Asher Roth; Mike Caren; Ben Allen; Kirk Robinson; Nat Robinson; Lana Moorer; Rivers Cuomo
- Producers: Mike Caren; Ben H. Allen (co.)

Asher Roth singles chronology
"I Love College" (2009)	"Lark on My Go-Kart" (2009)

"I Love College" is a song by American rapper Asher Roth, released by Schoolboy, SRC and Universal Motown Records on January 13, 2009, as both his commercial debut single and the lead single for his debut studio album, Asleep in the Bread Aisle (2009). The song was written by Roth and produced by Mike Caren and Ben H. Allen. It was later serviced for airplay to radio stations in the United Kingdom on April 27, 2009.

The song was inspired by Roth's experiences at West Chester University. The song originally sampled "Say It Ain't So" by American rock band Weezer, but was reworked by Ben H. Allen, as it is believed that Weezer's lead singer Rivers Cuomo refused to clear the sample. The song also samples "10% Dis" by MC Lyte.

== Music video ==
The music video was directed by Jonathan Lia and Scooter Braun. It was released to online outlets in early February. The video is set at a house party of the fictional Alpha Sigma Eta (ΑΣΗ) fraternity, and features activities such as binge drinking, smoking marijuana, strip poker, beer pong and "pieing".

== Remixes and other versions ==
A remix was produced for the Loud.com Producers Challenge in partnership with SRC, Asher's record label. The remix was produced by J Cardim and features beatboxer Chesney Snow, who beatboxed the entire beat. The track was released via Loud.com and YouTube.

Asher Roth and Jim Jones performed their remix together at mtvU Spring Break 2009.

In May 2009, a parody entitled "I Love Commons" was uploaded to YouTube by "The Davidson Show", a comedy webcast/channel produced by students at Davidson College and featured future NBA star Stephen Curry, a student at the school at the time.

In 2010, American rapper Sammy Adams released a version of the song titled "I Hate College". The version has over 10 million views on total YouTube publications.

== Chart performance ==
"I Love College" first appeared on the Billboard charts at number 85 on the Pop 100 in late February. The song eventually peaked at number 19 on the Pop 100 and number 12 on the Hot 100. The song sold over one million downloads in the United States in the first twelve weeks after release. It peaked at number 26 in the United Kingdom and at number 53 in Canada.

== Charts ==
=== Weekly charts ===
Chart (2009)	Peak position
Austria (Ö3 Austria Top 40)	53
Canada Hot 100 (Billboard)	53
Germany (GfK)	58
Ireland (IRMA)	45
UK Singles (OCC)	26
UK Hip Hop/R&B (OCC)	8
US Billboard Hot 100	12
US Billboard Bubbling Under R&B/Hip-Hop Singles	16
US Alternative Airplay (Billboard)	34
US Hot Rap Songs (Billboard)	18
US Pop Airplay (Billboard)	27

=== Year-end charts ===
Chart (2009)	Position
UK Singles (Official Charts Company)	198
US Billboard Hot 100	73
