= Washed Out =

American musician (born 1982)

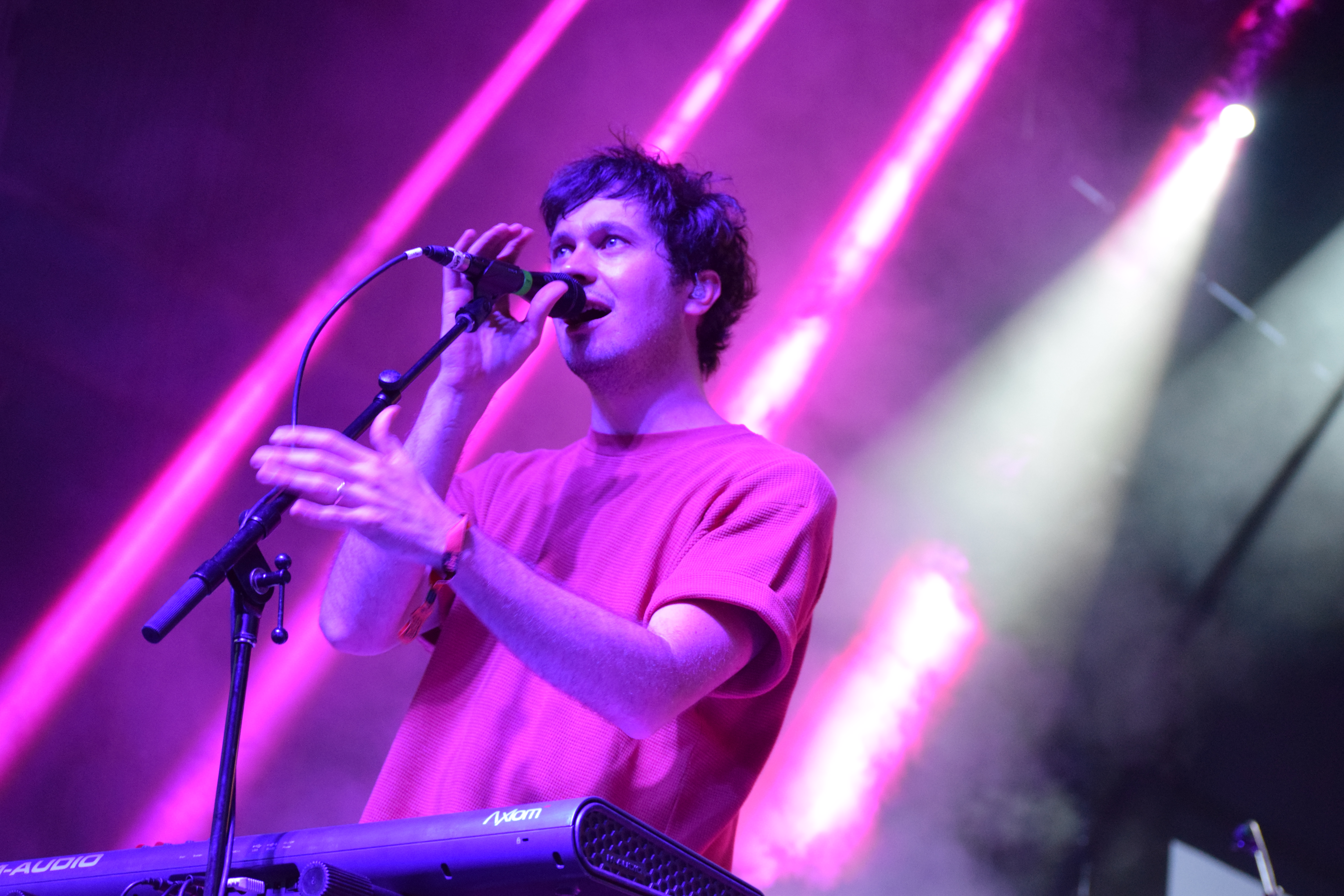
- Washed Out performing in July 2016

Background information
- Born: Ernest Weatherly Greene Jr. October 3, 1982 (age 44); Perry, Georgia, U.S.
- Genres: Chillwave; synth-pop; dream pop; bedroom pop
- Occupations: Singer; songwriter; record producer
- Years active: 2008–present
- Labels: Transparent; Mexican Summer; Sub Pop; Weird World; Mirror Universe Tapes; Stones Throw
- Website: washedout.net

Ernest Weatherly Greene Jr. (born October 3, 1982), better known by the stage name Washed Out, is an American singer, songwriter, and record producer. He is commonly associated with the genres of bedroom pop, chillwave, dream pop, and synth-pop. His 2009 breakout song "Feel It All Around" is generally regarded as the definitive chillwave track that set the template for the genre, leading Pitchfork to dub him the "Godfather of Chillwave".

== Early life ==
Ernest Weatherly Greene Jr. was born in Perry, Georgia, on October 3, 1982. After earning an undergraduate degree from the University of Georgia, he obtained an MLIS but was unable to find a job as a librarian. He moved back in with his parents and started producing songs in his bedroom studio, as well as working on dance music with local band Bedroom.

== Career ==
=== Origins (2008–2009) ===
Throughout 2008, Greene recorded lo-fi rock music under the stage name Lee Weather, but found more success in 2009 under the new stage name Washed Out. He was soon discovered by a number of influential music bloggers after they found his music on his Myspace page. His first recordings have been described as "drowsy, distorted, dance pop-influenced tracks that brought to mind Neon Indian and Memory Tapes".

=== High Times and Life of Leisure (2009–2010) ===
Greene's first two EPs, High Times and Life of Leisure, were released in August and September 2009. He held his debut New York City performance (his second live show ever) at Santos Party House. He has since performed at the 2010 Pitchfork Music Festival and his song "Feel It All Around" is used as the opening theme for the television series Portlandia.

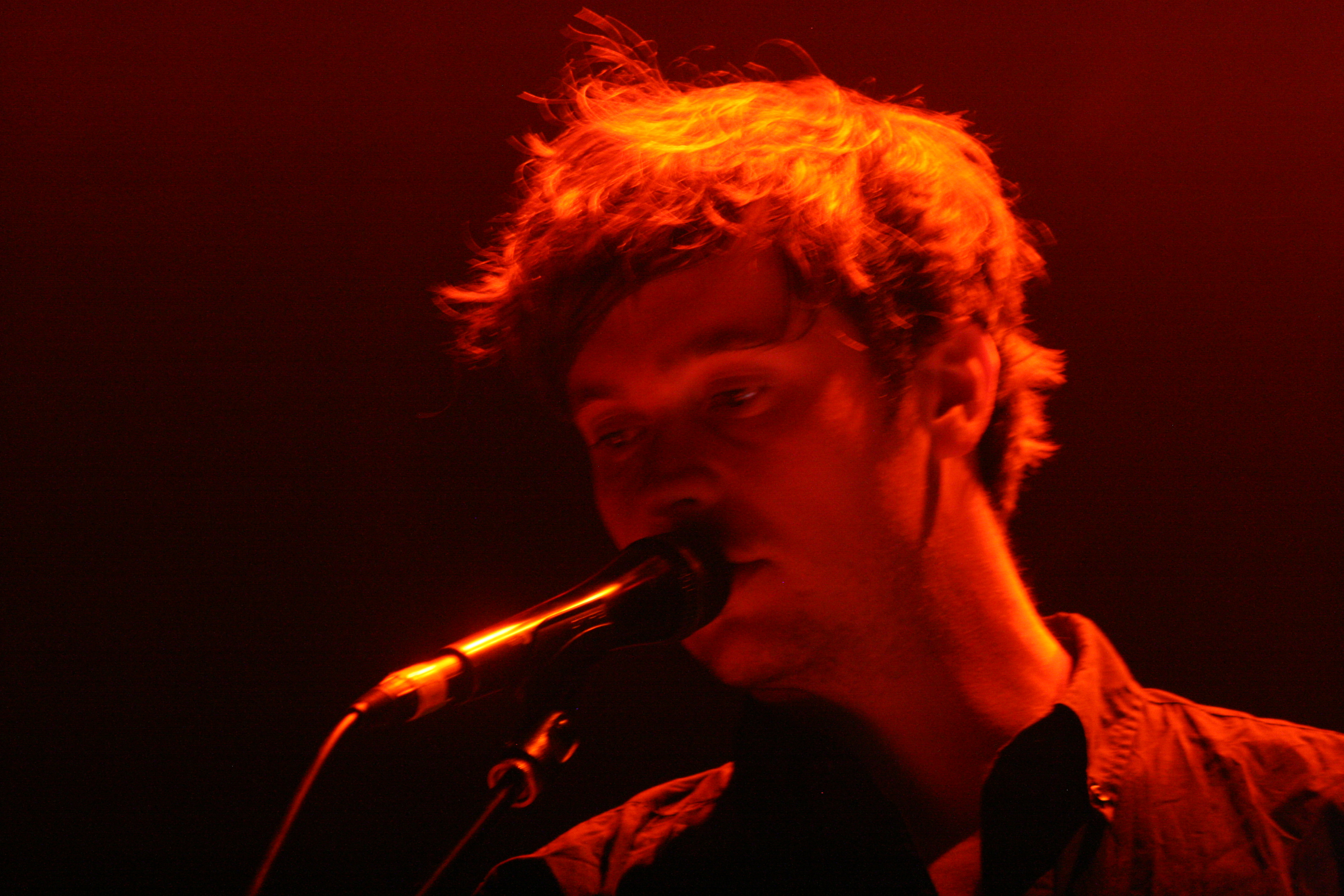
Washed Out performing at the Ogden Theatre in Denver, 2011

=== Within and Without and Paracosm (2011–2013) ===
In April 2011 it was announced that he had been signed to Sub Pop. His debut, Within and Without, then released on July 12, 2011. The album peaked at No. 26 on the Billboard 200 and No. 89 on the UK Albums Chart. He was chosen by Battles to perform at the ATP Nightmare Before Christmas festival that they co-curated in December 2011 in Minehead, England.

Washed Out's second album, Paracosm, was released on August 13, 2013. The first single was "It All Feels Right", followed by "Don't Give Up". The same year, "New Theory" from Life of Leisure featured in-background on a scene in the 2013 film, The Spectacular Now. In May 2014, he was reporting to be working on a third studio album, but he stated, "I'm figuring out the next step".

=== Mister Mellow and Purple Noon (2017–2020) ===
On May 19, Washed Out announced dates for his "Get Lost" tour, taking place in July 2017. Subsequently, he released his third studio album, Mister Mellow, on June 30, 2017. The album was produced at Stones Throw Records with the help of Cole M.G.N.

In April 2018, Washed Out released a new single, "Face Up" as part of Adult Swim's Singles Series. The single was later included on his fourth album, Purple Noon (2020). In April 2020, Washed Out released a new single, "Too Late". On June 30, 2020, Washed Out announced that a new album called Purple Noon would be released on August 7, 2020. He also released a new single, "Time to Walk Away".

=== Notes from a Quiet Life (2024–present) ===
During the Solar eclipse of April 8, 2024, Washed Out performed his music video for the song "Waking Up" in one take at Bandera, Texas. The performance was posted to his YouTube channel two months after the eclipse.

In May 2024, Washed Out announced his fifth studio album, Notes from a Quiet Life, and released its first single, "The Hardest Part", the video of which was made with OpenAI's Sora.

== Musical style ==
Greene's style has been identified with the chillwave movement. Sade's music and fashion sense are a big influence for Greene. He has said hip hop influences the way he writes songs. Pitchfork Media said that Greene "makes bedroom synthpop that sounds blurred and woozily evocative, like someone smeared Vaseline all over an early OMD demo tape, then stayed up all night trying to recreate what they heard."

== Personal life ==
Greene currently lives in Atlanta.

== Discography ==
- Within and Without (2011)
- Paracosm (2013)
- Mister Mellow (2017)
- Purple Noon (2020)
- Notes from a Quiet Life (2024)
