= Southern Gothic (album) =

Studio album by The Constellations
- Released: June 21, 2010
- Genre: Hip hop, rock, psychedelic rock
- Label: Virgin Records

Southern Gothic is the debut album by Atlanta-based hip hop/rock band The Constellations. It was released on June 21, 2010 and features cameo appearances from Cee-Lo Green and Asher Roth. "Perfect Day" has been featured in films and TV shows such as Horrible Bosses, Chuck and Suits.

== Track listing ==
1. "Setback" - 5:23
2. "Perfect Day" - 4:24
3. "Love Is a Murder (Feat. Cee-Lo) - 3:46
4. "December" - 4:11
5. "Take a Ride" - 4:57
6. "We're Here to Save the Day (Feat. Asher Roth)" - 3:29
7. "Felicia" - 3:29
8. "Step Right Up" - 9:15
9. "What I See" - 5:42
10. "Weighing Me Down" 3:59
11. "On My Way Up" - 5:40
