= Within and Without (album) =

2011 studio album by Washed Out

Studio album by Washed Out
- Released: July 6, 2011
- Genre: Chillwave; synth-pop
- Length: 40:43
- Label: Sub Pop
- Producer: Ben H. Allen; Ernest Greene

Washed Out chronology
Life of Leisure (2009)	Within and Without (2011)	Paracosm (2013)

Within and Without is the debut studio album by American singer Washed Out, released on July 6, 2011, by Sub Pop. The album debuted at number 26 on the Billboard 200 with first-week sales of 15,000 copies, and by July 2013, it had sold 89,000 copies in the United States.

== Artwork ==
The cover for Within and Without uses an image that also appeared in the May 2011 issue of Cosmopolitan magazine, accompanying an article titled "Is This the Most Satisfying Sex Position?". Washed Out told Exclaim!, "We licensed the image from the photographer Martien Mulder from New York. I had seen the image in this avant-garde photography magazine while we were on tour in Australia and it was just an ad for one of her exhibitions. I loved it for a lot of different reasons. When we licensed it we thought we had exclusive rights to it and then a month later she licensed it again to Cosmopolitan." He also stated he was disappointed to see the photo used in an article on sexual positions, "mainly because it undercut all of my ideas about what the image represented and what the album represented", as he felt "it wasn't sexual at all and it wasn't supposed to be provocative."

== Critical reception ==
Professional ratings
Aggregate scores
Source	Rating
AnyDecentMusic?	6.9/10
Metacritic	70/100
Review scores
Source	Rating
AllMusic	3/5 stars
The A.V. Club	B
The Guardian	4/5 stars
The Irish Times	4/5 stars
NME	5/10
Pitchfork	8.3/10
Q	4/5 stars
Rolling Stone	3.5/5 stars
Slant Magazine	4/5 stars
Spin	9/10

Within and Without received generally positive reviews from music critics. At Metacritic, which assigns a normalized rating out of 100 to reviews from mainstream publications, the album received an average score of 70, based on 34 reviews.

Kevin Liedel of Slant Magazine praised its juxtaposition of "warm, decades-old retrograde styles with the despondent, isolated, and decidedly modern mood of [Ernest] Greene's alienated narratives ... Melodies and instrumentation are infused with sunny, tender basslines and mellow synths that harken back to soft, '70s-era R&B rhythms, electrified '80s pop, and synth-heavy shoegaze, while Greene's muffled vocals and haunting atmospherics provide angst-ridden counterpoints." Brandon Soderberg of Pitchfork noted the album's improved production values compared to Greene's previous output, and called it a "declaration to snarky ironists that there is nothing to be ashamed of" about the chillwave genre.

However, Paul Lester of BBC Music gave the album a mixed review, stating: "The rhythm is repetitive but sounds played rather than sequenced, offering the idea that Within and Without is less synthetic, more 'real', an unnecessary development considering how moving those early Washed Out tunes were, while production-wise the new material is actually a less punchy version of Greene's pristine melancholia, more waffly and wan."

== Track listing ==
All tracks are written by Ernest Greene, except where noted.

Within and Without – standard edition
No.	Title	Length
1.	"Eyes Be Closed"	4:47
2.	"Echoes"	4:08
3.	"Amor Fati"	4:26
4.	"Soft"	5:31
5.	"Far Away"	4:00
6.	"Before"	4:46
7.	"You and I" (featuring Caroline Polachek; writers: Greene, Polachek)	5:13
8.	"Within and Without"	3:32
9.	"A Dedication"	4:17
Total length:		40:40

Within and Without – iTunes Store bonus track
No.	Title	Length
10.	"Call It Off"	3:32
Total length:		49:41

Within and Without – Japanese edition bonus tracks
No.	Title	Length
10.	"Eyes Be Closed" (Alex Version)	3:26
11.	"Step Back"	2:38
Total length:		54:48

Within and Without – Japanese iTunes Store bonus tracks
No.	Title	Length
10.	"Eyes Be Closed" (Alex Version)	3:26
11.	"Step Back"	2:38
12.	"Olivia"	2:29
13.	"Luck"	2:16
Total length:		51:29

Within and Without – Australian edition bonus tracks
No.	Title	Length
10.	"Olivia"	2:27
11.	"Call It Off"	3:32
Total length:		46:39

== Personnel ==
- Ben H. Allen – production, mixing, bass guitar, percussion
- Ernest Greene – production, art direction
- Joe Lambert – mastering
- John Maskew – recording
- Rob Skipworth – recording
- Mark Cobb – rototoms (track 1)
- Bradley Hagen – drums (track 4)
- Heather McIntosh – cello (track 5)
- Caroline Polachek – vocals (track 7)
- Jeff Kleinsmith – art direction, design
- Martien Mulder – photos (except peach tree)

== Charts ==
Chart performance for Within and Without
Chart (2011)	Peak position
Australian Hitseekers Albums (ARIA)	20
Belgian Heatseekers Albums (Ultratop Flanders)	1
Belgian Heatseekers Albums (Ultratop Wallonia)	2
Dutch Albums (Album Top 100)	80
Norwegian Albums (VG-lista)	36
UK Albums (OCC)	89
UK Independent Albums (OCC)	12
US Billboard 200	26
US Independent Albums (Billboard)	5
US Top Alternative Albums (Billboard)	6
US Top Rock Albums (Billboard)	6

== Release history ==
Release history for Within and Without
Region	Date	Label	Ref.
Japan	July 6, 2011	Yoshimoto R and C	
Germany	July 8, 2011	Domino	
United Kingdom	July 11, 2011	Weird World	
United States	July 12, 2011	Sub Pop	
Australia	July 29, 2011	Pod	
