= The Constellations =

American hip hop/rock band

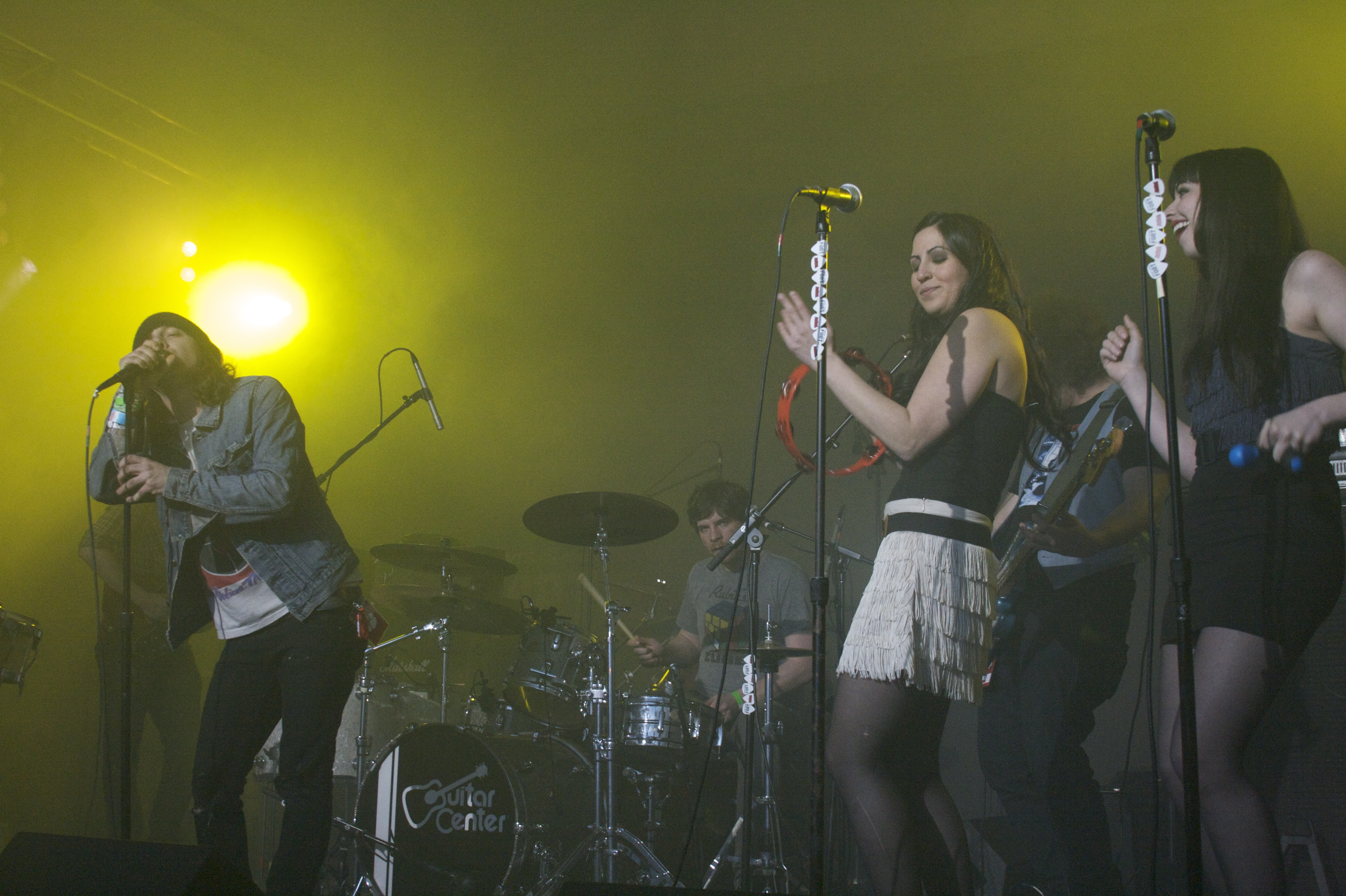
- The Constellations performing live at South by Southwest 2010.

Background information
- Origin: Atlanta, Georgia, U.S.
- Genres: Hip hop, rock
- Years active: 2008–2013, 2018–present
- Label: 429 Records
- Members: Elijah Jones (vocals/keys/band leader); Jared Wuestenburg (bass); Gabe Roman (drums); Erik Matthijs (guitar, bgv); Ken Martin (guitar, bgv )
- Past members: Jamie Gordon(Keyboards, percussion); Ryan Davis (guitar); Jason Nackers (drums); Alaina Terry (bgv, keys, percussion)
- Website: www.theconstellationsofficial.com

The Constellations is an American hip hop/rock band formed in Atlanta, Georgia. They have a psychedelic soul-rock sound.

== History ==
Formed in Atlanta, the band was signed to a four-album deal with Virgin Records.

Their song “We’re Here To Save The Day” was featured in the NBC season premiere of Chuck on September 20, 2010, and is also included in the soundtrack for the video game NBA 2K11.

They have had their songs featured on television shows like USA's Royal Pains and Suits, The CW's The Vampire Diaries, and Fox's House. "Perfect Day" was featured in the film Horrible Bosses.

Following their 2010 debut Southern Gothic they signed with Santa Monica, California–based 429 Records and released an EP titled "Sold Out" on March 20, 2012, as an appetizer to their second full-length album Do It for Free slated for a June 12, 2012, worldwide release. "Right Where I Belong" was chosen as the first single. The band is touring the country in support of the album on Warped Tour.

As of September 2013, the band has been on hiatus, according to the band's Facebook page.

In the fall of 2018, Elijah Jones announced that the band would release "Dreams of Oneonta" as the lead single for King of the Gutter, their first album in nearly six years. "Dreams of Oneonta" was released October 8, 2018. While King of the Gutter was recorded in 2014, Jones' problem with addiction prevented them from finishing the album. Dixon contacted Jones in early 2018 about revisiting the material and together they produced and mixed the original recordings. Of the songs, Jones said, "I was basically writing about my downfall, the prelude to a complete mental breakdown. I was basically documenting [it]. I didn't realize it at the time, but that's what I was writing about." King of the Gutter was released on January 10, 2019, after being announced the previous day in a Facebook post.

== Discography ==
=== Studio albums ===
- Southern Gothic (2010) — released June 22, 2010 (Virgin)
- Do It for Free (2012) — released June 12, 2012 (429 Records)
- King of the Gutter (2019) — released January 10, 2019
- Problematic For The People (2024) — released September 19, 2024
- Pretending To Fly (2025) - released February 21, 2025

=== Singles ===
- "We're Here To Save The Day" (2010)
- "Setback" (2010)
- "Felicia" (2010) [#34 - US Alternative Songs]
- "Love Is A Murder" (2010)
- "Right Where I Belong" (2012)
- "Dreams of Oneonta" (2018)

=== Music videos ===
- "Setback" (2010)
- "Perfect Day" (2010)
- "Felicia" (2010)
- "Love Is A Murder" (2011)
- "Side by Side" (2012)
- "Afterparty" (2012)
- "Right Where I Belong" (2012)
