= Logos (disambiguation) =

Logos is an important term in philosophy, analytical psychology, rhetoric, and religion.

Logos may also refer to:

- Plural of logo

== Religion ==
=== Christianity ===
- Logos (Christianity), name or title of Jesus Christ
- Logos Bible Software, a software application
- Logos Radio, a Christian radio channel in Cyprus
- Logos: A Journal of Catholic Thought and Culture, an academic journal
- MV Logos II, a 1968 ship used in evangelical missions of Operation Mobilisation
- Logos School, a Christian school in Moscow, Idaho

=== Other ===
- Logos (Islam)
- Logos, in the writing of Terence McKenna

== Music ==
- Logos Live, a 1982 album by Tangerine Dream
- Logos (Atlas Sound album), 2009
- Logos (Selfish Things album), 2019

== In fiction ==
- A character in Final Fantasy X-2
- A language in Tabula Rasa
- One of the three Trinity Core Processors known as the Aegises in Xenoblade Chronicles 2
- "Logos", a storyline in the science fiction comedy webtoon series Live with Yourself!

== Science and technology ==
- Logos Machine Translation System (now OpenLogos)
- 58534 Logos, a Kuiper belt object

== Other uses ==
- Logos Dictionary, an online dictionary provided by Logos Group
- Logos Foundation, an organisation for the promotion of new musics and audio
- Logos (journal), an American academic journal

== See also ==
- Logo (disambiguation)
