= Don J. Briel =

American theologian

Dr. Don J. Briel
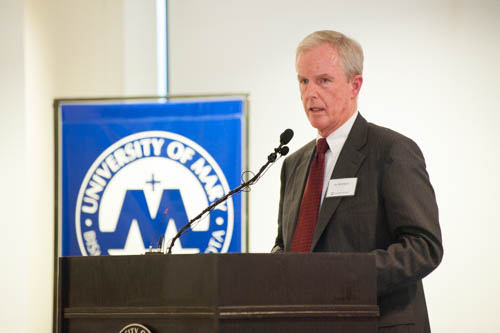
- Dr. Don J. Briel
- Born: January 28, 1947
- Died: February 15, 2018 (age 71)
- Theological work
- Notable ideas: Founder of the first Catholic Studies program

Don J. Briel (January 28, 1947 – February 15, 2018) was an American theologian who held the Blessed John Henry Newman Chair of Liberal Arts at the University of Mary in Bismarck, North Dakota from August 2014 until his death in 2018. He was the founder of the Center for Catholic Studies at the University of St. Thomas in St. Paul, Minnesota, where he held the Koch Chair of Catholic Studies and served as Director from 1993 to 2014.

== Early life and education ==
The second of three children, Briel was born in Ventura, California, to Carl and Francis Irene (Dages) Briel. His father worked as a manager for Sears Roebuck and his mother held various positions as an executive secretary. Not long after Briel's birth, his father was transferred to various stores throughout southern California and the family moved accordingly until settling for some time in Reno, NV, where Briel graduated from St. Thomas Aquinas Elementary School in 1961 and Bishop Manogue Catholic High School in the spring of 1965. Briel enrolled in the University of Notre Dame the same year and completed a Bachelor of Arts in history in 1969, having studied under Frank O'Malley. He studied literature at Trinity College in Dublin, Ireland, and earned a Licentiate (1976) and Doctorate (1980) in Catholic Theology from the University of Strasbourg in France. His scholarly work focused on the work of Cardinal John Henry Newman, who is much associated with a well-known text on higher education, The Idea of a University. His dissertation was entitled, Isaac Williams and Newman: The Oxford Movement Controversy of 1838-1841.

== Career in academia ==
After brief teaching stints at St. Vincent Ferrer High School in Vallejo, CA, the University of San Francisco and St. Mary of the Plains, Briel was hired by the University of St. Thomas in 1981. He was Chair of the Theology Department from 1990 to 1999, the first non-clergyman to hold the position, and served for a time as Associate Dean of the College of Arts and Sciences. In 1996 the students of the University of Saint Thomas elected him the Aquinas Scholars Honor Society Professor of the Year.

In 1993, aiming to rejuvenate Catholic higher education and revive the Catholic Intellectual Tradition, Briel and several colleagues established the Center for Catholic Studies. It became the nation's inaugural program of its kind and awarded its first degrees to students in 1995. Over the course of the next twenty years, that project went from being a small interdisciplinary program, to a minor, then to a major, then to a department within the College of Arts and Sciences, with some three hundred undergraduate majors and minors and seventy-five Master's students.

Briel founded Logos: A Journal of Catholic Thought and Culture, and engineered the establishment of three institutes connected to the Center for Catholic Studies: the John A Ryan Institute for Catholic Social Thought, Murphy Institute for Law and Public Policy, and the Habiger Institute for Catholic Leadership.

In 1998 Briel collaborated with the Pontifical University of Saint Thomas Aquinas to launch a program for students in Rome, Italy, and two years later the Bernardi Campus of the University of St. Thomas was acquired and dedicated.

Since the founding of the first Catholic Studies program by Briel in 1993, nearly one hundred programs in Catholic Studies have been established at colleges and universities in the United States and other countries. Briel has consulted with universities in the Philippines, Cameroon, Canada, Italy, Peru, and Spain.

== University of Mary ==
In August 2014, at an academic conference entitled “Twenty Years of Catholic Studies,” the University of Mary conferred an honorary doctorate upon Briel in recognition of his contributions to Catholic higher education and announced that Briel had been appointed as the first occupant of the Blessed John Henry Newman Chair of Liberal Arts. The many lectures given by those impacted and influenced by the life and work of Briel were compiled into a book, published by the University of Mary, entitled Renewal of Catholic Higher Education: Essays on Catholic Studies in Honor of Don J. Briel. Among his many duties at Mary, he had been actively involved in the ongoing formation of faculty and staff in the Catholic intellectual and Benedictine wisdom traditions.

== Illness and death ==
In early January 2018, following a checkup from a previous eye surgery and a subsequent blood test, it was revealed that Briel had cancer cells in his blood. Physicians first thought it was a treatable leukemia, only to discover that it was in fact a rare form of double acute leukemia, an untreatable form of the cancer. He was told he had about a month to live. Despite the sudden news, many witnessed Briel - their friend, mentor, teacher, and father - accepting the prognosis with great peace, thanking God for the opportunity to settle his affairs before his death. Throughout his final weeks, Briel enjoyed many visits from those he had taught over the years, as well as colleagues, peers, and family. On February 15, surrounded by close family and friends, Don J. Briel died at his home in Minneapolis, Minnesota. Shortly after his death his friend George Weigel noted: "Newman had had inscribed on his tombstone Ex umbris et imaginibus in veritatem — 'From shadows and phantasms into the truth.' That is what Don Briel did for thousands of students: he led them from the shadowlands of post-modern incoherence into the truth that reflects the Truth who is the Triune God."

The Funeral Mass was offered on February 20 at the Cathedral of Saint Paul (Minnesota) by the president of the University of Mary, Monsignor James Shea. Bishop Andrew Cozzens, a former student of Briel, attended in choir, and the homily recalled the educational and spiritual convictions lived and taught by Briel in the course of his life.

== Professional memberships ==
- Advisory Board, Lumen Christi Institute, University of Chicago
- Advisory Board, Institute for Catholic Studies, Loyola University New Orleans
- Advisory Board, University of Notre Dame, Center for Ethics and Culture
- Advisory Council on Justice Education, Association of Catholic Colleges and Universities
- Advisory Council, Holy Spirit Academy, Monticello, MN
- Board of Trustees, American Academy of Liberal Education (AALE)
