= The Dovers =

American garage rock band

- Origin: Santa Barbara, California, U.S.
- Genre: Garage rock
- Years active: 1965–1966
- Labels: Miramar Records; Reprise Records
- Past members: Bruce Clawson; Tim Granada; Robbie Ladewig; Rick Morinini; Tony Rivas; Randy Busby; Nick Hoffman

The Dovers were an American garage rock band of the mid-1960s from Santa Barbara, California. The band were an example of mid-1960s folk rock, psychedelic rock and pop, heavily influenced by the British Invasion and American groups such as The Byrds.

== Career ==
The Dovers were from Santa Barbara, California, and started their band under the name The Vandells. They began their recording career very shortly after as The Dovers in 1965 with the Miramar Records release "She's Gone" / "What Am I Going To Do?", which reportedly was a minor hit in the Santa Barbara–Ventura County area.

Three singles, recorded at the Gold Star Studios in Hollywood, Los Angeles, followed in late 1965 and early 1966, showing The Dovers' interest in folk rock and pop. None of their four singles were met with national success, and The Dovers broke up shortly afterward with their final sessions taking place in May 1966.

The group recorded a total of four singles for Miramar:

- "She's Gone" / "What Am I Going To Do?" (Miramar 118, September 1965);
- "I Could Be Happy" / "People Ask Me Why" (Miramar 121, November 1965, also released as Reprise 0439, December 1965);
- "The Third Eye" / "Your Love" (Miramar 123, April 1966)
- "She's Not Just Anybody" / "About Me" (Miramar 124, May 1966)

A Top 40 list from radio station KIST in Santa Barbara from May 28, 1966, shows The Dovers' single "The Third Eye" listed as one of the station's "Hit Bound Sounds" of the week.

== Legacy ==
The Dovers went largely unnoticed by music collectors until garage rock compilation albums were released in the late 1970s and early 1980s. A cult following developed around the group, who became known among collectors for their catchy songs and wistful vocals. "What Am I Going To Do" is available on Rhino Records' Nuggets box set. "She's Gone" is available on BFD Records' Pebbles, Volume 2, while "She's Not Just Anybody" is available on AIP Records' Pebbles 8, Southern California 1. The group's original bass player, Laudewig, died in the 1980s.

In 1994, short-lived New Zealand indie supergroup Pop Art Toasters released an energetic version of "What Am I Going to Do?".

In 2001, Misty Lane Records issued a 10" vinyl retrospective album that includes all 8 songs by The Dovers, called We're Not Just Anybody.

The 2009 song "Walkabout" by Atlas Sound, the solo project of Bradford Cox of Atlanta band Deerhunter, samples the keys from the track "What Am I Going To Do". The song is a collaboration with Noah Lennox of Animal Collective and appears on Cox's second solo studio album Logos.

In 2016, Melbourne, Australia-based electronic group The Avalanches, sampled the tracks "She's Gone" and "I Could Be Happy" for their track "Sunshine" on their second studio album Wildflower.

In 2020, Los Angeles-based artist Ariel Pink released a cover of the track "She's Gone" after frequently performing it live.

In 2025, Misty Lane Records reissued We're Not Just Anybody with remastered tracks only available on 12" vinyl and slightly updated cover art.

== Band members ==
The Dovers were:

- Bruce Clawson (guitar)
- Tim Granada (guitar, vocals)
- Robbie Laudewig (bass)
- Rick Morinini (drums, singles 1–2)
- Randy Busby (drums, singles 3–4)
- Tony Rivas (saxophone, tambourine, backing vocals)
- Nick Hoffman (guitar, replaced Clawson)

== In literature ==
In July 2007, Jawbone Press published Riot on the Sunset Strip: Rock 'n' Roll's Last Stand in Hollywood (ISBN 978-1-906002-04-6) by American author Domenic Priore. The book featured a few pages on the history of The Dovers, including an interview with the band's guitarist and vocalist Tim Granada.
