= Logo (disambiguation) =

A logo is a graphic used to represent an entity.

Logo may also refer to:

== Places ==
- Logo, Mali
- Logo, Nigeria

== People ==
- Jerry West, a.k.a. "The Logo", American basketball player

== Cultures and human languages ==
- Logo language
- Logo people, an ethnic group

== Arts, entertainment, and media ==
- Logo Board Game, often shortened to "LOGO"
- Logo Records, a record label
- Logo TV, an LGBT cable channel in the United States

== Other uses ==
- Logo (programming language)
- Logo Yazılım, Turkish business software company
- Logo, the shortened word for a production logo, where a short animation plays to show a logo of a company
- Honda Logo, a car
- Sequence logo, bioinformatics
- Siemens LOGO!, a Programmable logic controller

== See also ==
- Logos (disambiguation)
