= Lemniscate (album) =

Studio album by Vinyl Williams
- Released: November 12, 2012
- Label: Salonislam; No Pain in Pop

Lemniscate is the debut album from Los Angeles–based experimental pop band, Vinyl Williams, led by Lionel Williams.

Lemniscate was released through No Pain In Pop (EU) and Williams' own Salonislam imprint (US) on November 12, 2012. Available formats included 12" vinyl album, CD and download. Lemniscate features a mix of genres including electronic, krautrock, psychedelia, rock, shoegaze, pop and chillwave.

== Critical reception ==
Professional ratings
Aggregate scores
Source	Rating
AnyDecentMusic?	6.7/10
Review scores
Source	Rating
DIY	3.5/5 stars
Exclaim!	7/10
The Guardian	4/5 stars
NME	3.5/5 stars

The Guardian's New Music critic, Michael Cragg, reviewed the album's track Open Your Mind in October 2012, while "Lemniscate" as a whole was featured as Rough Trade's "Album Of The Week" shortly after its release. Other media outlets reviewing the album included This is fake DIY and James Skinner from BBC Music.

== Artwork ==
The album artwork is an original photo taken by Jay Bender.

== Track listing ==
All songs created and performed solely by songwriter, vocalist, instrumentalist and producer Williams.

No.	Title	Length
1.	"Tokyo - Sumatra"	2:30
2.	"Higher Worlds"	4:09
3.	"Stellarscope"	3:59
4.	"Who Are You"	3:01
5.	"Grassy"	4:21
6.	"Object Of The Source"	2:48
7.	"Inner Space"	4:30
8.	"Open Your Mind"	5:10
9.	"Follow Your Dreams"	7:04
