= Player piano (disambiguation) =

A player piano is a self-playing piano.

Player piano may also refer to:

- Player Piano (novel), 1952 novel by Kurt Vonnegut
- Player Piano (album), 2011 album of Dayve Hawke
- The Player Piano, American post-rock band
