= Observer Drift =

- Birth name: Collin Daniel Ward
- Origin: Minneapolis, United States
- Genres: Dream pop, Indie, Shoegaze, Chillwave
- Years active: 2011–present

Observer Drift is an American project started in 2011 by musician from Minneapolis Collin Daniel Ward. Ward is a young college student and musician who creates music in his basement and bedroom. His debut album Corridors was self-released on January 12, 2012. The debut album explores themes such as dreams that people have and memories of young childhood. Fjords, Observer Drift's second release, revolves around themes of growth and change. Ward's music is a blend of Dream pop and Shoegaze with atmospheric and electronic elements. In 2012 Ward was named one of Minneapolis' top 10 "Picked to Click" in Minneapolis based City Pages. Ward also has a second music project with his brother, Matthew. They released their self-titled album, Northward, early in 2014, which has been featured on 89.3 The Current.

== Discography ==
- Corridors (2012)
- Fjords (2013)
- Echolocation (2015)
- Nightfall-91 (2018)
- The Outsider (2021)
