= Memory Tapes =

American singer, songwriter and record producer (born 1981)

- Also known as: Memory Cassette, Weird Tapes
- Born: Dayve Hawk; 1981 (age 44–45); New Jersey, United States
- Genres: Chillwave, glo-fi
- Occupations: Singer-songwriter, record producer
- Years active: 2008–2015
- Labels: Something in Construction, Carpark Records, Sincerely Yours, Acéphale, Inertia Records
- Website: memorytapes.bandcamp.com

Dayve Hawk (born 1981), better known by his stage name Memory Tapes, is a New Jersey-based singer-songwriter and record producer, and the former frontman of the Philadelphia-based band, Hail Social who were active between 2004 and 2008.

== Career ==
=== Memory Cassette / Weird Tapes: Early EPs (2008–2009) ===
Hawk first began releasing solo material under the names "Memory Cassette" and "Weird Tapes", releasing three EPs under these monikers across 2008 and 2009: The Hiss We Missed, Rewind Whilst Sleeping, and Call & Response.

=== Seek Magic (2009–2010) ===
Hawk's first album as "Memory Tapes", Seek Magic, released on August 24, 2009 via three labels: Something in Construction, Sincerely Yours, and Acéphale. The album's artwork features "Mirage", a painting by American artist Tomory Dodge.

The album sold over 1,000 copies on pre-release through Rough Trade, and has since sold over 30,000 copies. The CD release of Seek Magic was bundled with a four-track bonus disc including a remix by The Horrors and a 22-minute instrumental, "Treeship", which was also available as a free download from Hawk's website. The Quietus commented on the album's only single, "Bicycle", saying, "It’s a neat trick, alright: a song to make you look back on 2009 with a bittersweet sigh before the year is even out". Pitchfork equally described the album as, "a record of achingly gorgeous dance-pop that captures both the joy of nostalgia and the melancholic sense that we're grasping for good times increasingly out of reach".

Hawk toured Seek Magic from January to March 2010 across Europe and North America.

=== Player Piano (2011) ===
Hawk's second album, Player Piano, was released on July 5, 2011 via Something in Construction in Europe, Carpark Records in the U.S. and Inertia in Australia. The album's artwork features a gouache painting by Japanese artist Kazuki Takamatsu.

Player Piano saw Hawk move away from the chillwave style that surrounded his previous works, moving more towards a bedroom pop sound, describing his own album as a collection of "keyboard-based psychedelic girl group songs". The album received mixed reviews, with Pitchfork describing the album as "flat and airless, sucked dry of his typically evocative detailing". BBC Music also provided a mixed review commenting, "Player Piano is a musical jacket potato: satisfying but never amazing". However, Drowned in Sound provided a positive review, noting, "this is the sound of a man taking a significant step forward. The limelight awaits".

Hawk toured Player Piano throughout July and August 2011 in both Europe and North America.

=== Grace / Confusion and subsequent releases (2012–2015) ===
Hawk released his third and most recent album, Grace / Confusion, on December 4, 2012.

On October 11, 2013, Hawk self-released an EP titled September.

Hawk released a single, "Fallout" / "House on Fire" on October 25, 2015.

== Musical style ==
Hawk's work as both Memory Cassette and Memory Tapes is associated with the chillwave music genre which emerged in the late 2000s. Seek Magic made use of both dance rhythms and sounds, and had touchstones such as Cut Copy, New Order, and The Cure. Player Piano was compared with the likes of M83.

== Personal life ==
Hawk lives in New Jersey with his wife and two daughters.

== Discography ==
=== Studio albums ===
- Seek Magic (2009)
- Player Piano (2011)
- Grace/Confusion (2012)

=== EPs ===
- The Hiss We Missed (as Memory Cassette) (2008)
- Rewind While Sleeping (as Memory Cassette) (2008)
- Call & Response (as Memory Cassette) (2009)
- September (2013)

=== Singles ===
- "Bicycle" / "Plain Material" (2009)
- "Walk Me Home" (2009)
- "Graphics" (Re-modal edit)" / "Easy Pert Mom" (2010)
- "Today Is Our Life" (2011)
- "Yes I Know" / "First Hills" (2011)
- "Fallout" / "House On Fire" (2015)
