= Walk Me Home =

Walk Me Home may also refer to:

- "Walk Me Home" (Mandy Moore song) (1999)
  - "Mandy Moore: Walk Me Home", an episode of MTV's Making the Video
- "Walk Me Home (Pink song)" (2019)
- "Walk Me Home", a 1983 song by Chet Atkins from Work It Out with Chet Atkins C.G.P.
- "Walk Me Home", a 2009 song by Memory Tapes (Dayve Hawke) from Seek Magic
- Walk Me Home..., a 2022 EP by Benson Boone
- Walk Me Home, a 2014 album by Secret Cities
- Walk Me Home, a 2013 novel by Catherine Ryan Hyde
- Walk Me Home, a 1993 film by Timothy Neat shot on the island of Inch Kenneth
