= Vinyl Williams =

American neo-psychedelic band

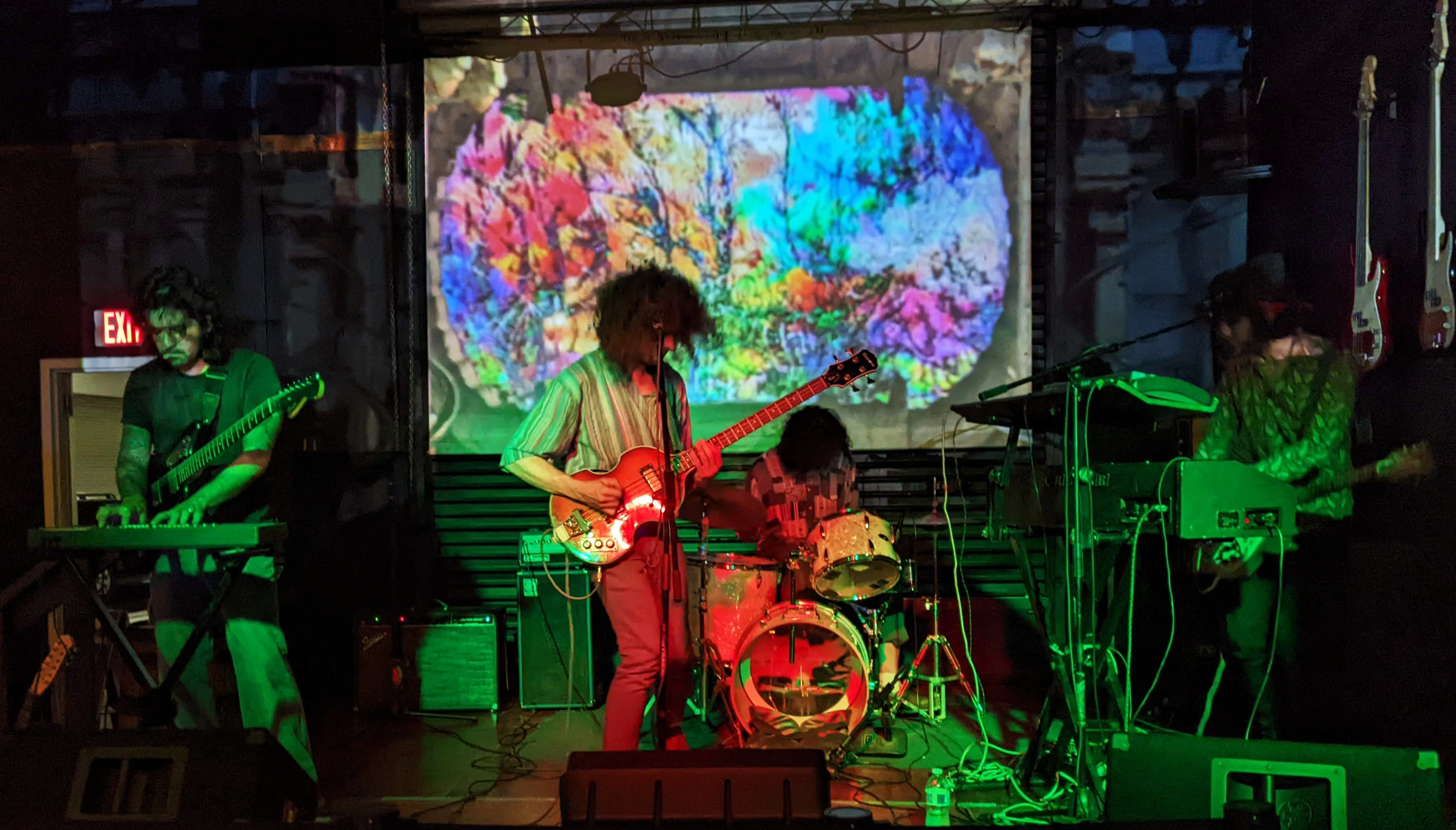
- Vinyl Williams performing in 2023

Background information
- Origin: Los Angeles, California, United States
- Genres: Neo-psychedelia; electronic; dream pop; shoegaze; krautrock; chillwave; hypnagogic pop
- Years active: 2007-present
- Members: Lionel Williams

Vinyl Williams is an American neo-psychedelic band led by Los Angeles-based multimedia artist and musician Lionel Williams, active since 2007. Vinyl Williams has released nine studio albums.

Williams, who calls his music "celestial pop", has been described as neo-psychedelia, electronic, dream pop, shoegaze, krautrock, chillwave, and hypnagogic pop. Dummy Mag has called Williams a "retro futurist with a penchant for analogue noise and sonic transcendentalism".

== History ==
Lionel Williams is the grandson of cinematic composer John Williams, and the son of session drummer and producer Mark Towner Williams and classical pianist Leah Williams.

He began recording as Vinyl Williams in 2007, and self-released the extended play Naked Sanctuary in July 2010. Other musicians who played with Williams in these early days included drummer Bryan Lee and bassists Calin Stephensen and Craig Murray.

In 2011, Williams assembled a backing band that included synth player Nikita Arefkia, multi-instrumentalist Ian Gibbs, drummer/synth player James Lake, and bassist/drummer Billy Winger.

Ultimate World, written and performed solely by Williams, was released by Warmest Chord on April 9, 2012, The video for "Chroma Heart", premiered by Vice Media's Noisey site on April 10, 2012, was the first video created by Williams and included reference to his collage work.

Vinyl Williams' debut studio album, Lemniscate, was released on November 12, 2012, by No Pain in Pop in Europe and self-released in North America. The Fader premiered videos for "Higher Worlds" and "Harmonious Change" prior to the album's release. The album received a positive reception from critics. The Guardian gave the album a positive 4 out of 5 rating, while Pitchfork critic Patric Fallon said, "Lionel 'Vinyl' Williams' retro-obsessed psych-pop is obscured in lo-fi tape hiss, riddled with microphone distortions, and sounds as if it was crafted purely from the dust lifted off of Can records. His wavering voice floats inside gobs of delay and reverb, constantly changing tone and pitch amidst the thick smoke of smoldering synth tones and destroyed guitar strums".

Vinyl Williams was interviewed by Dazed & Confused in October 2012, and contributed original art to the article.

No Pain in Pop released the "Stellarscope" single on March 1, 2013, including a Europa51 remix featuring ex-Stereolab member Andy Ramsay. Williams and Arefkia created an interactive music video to coincide with the release, which premiered the same day on Dazed Digital. Williams said: "'Stellarscope' is an interactive environment. It's meant to be explored as a self-generative process – you create the visuals by wandering throughout. Certain objects have sounds that emanate out of them (rainforest sounds in the jungle, ambient drones out of celestial tree disks, low drones out of the ending chalice) which are in congruency with the actual song. If you can make into a close proximity to those objects during the duration of the song, in a sense you can jam with it. It's supposed to allow navigation into a visual and sonic improvisational world. There is no interface or goal, it's really about exploring, and ultimately a test of digital dexterity. It appears to be a little difficult to navigate through a space jungle kingdom built on seamless stream-of-consciousness."

While in Seoul, South Korea, Williams met with Chaz Bundick of Toro y Moi and the two decided to collaborate on a conceptual, interactive record combining music and visuals; Trance Zen Dental Spa was released as a free digital EP on December 10, 2014, by Bundick's Company Records. Williams explained: "The most conceptually-intact way for this project to exist is as a digital form. It's about issues of simulated phenomena that ultimately end up as choose-your-own-adventure hypnotism".

Company Records released the second Vinyl Williams studio album, Into, on 24 July 24, 2015. The album's lead single, "World Soul", premiered on April 29 on Stereogum, and was described as a "clinic on layering synths and electro atmospheric sounds". On June 15, the video for "World Soul" was premiered by Clash, which described it as "a feast for the eyes - flickering colour, hypnotic shapes and more".

Vinyl Williams released his third album, Brunei, on August 26, 2016, on Company. It included the singles "Riddles of the Sphinx" and "L'Quasar", and was followed by a 8/10 review by Clash stating "Brunei brings things into sharper focus. Williams manages to retain the transportive element of his previous work while slightly neatening the edges."

A fourth album, Opal, was released by the French label Requiem Pour Un Twister on July 20, 2018, preceded by the singles "Lansing" and "Noumena" and a 360-degree video for "Aphelion". Opal was listed on NME's top 100 albums of the year at #93, and given a 7.6 review on Pitchfork. Opal is Williams's most referred-to album because of Williams's use of VHS camcorder effects, and polyphonic chord techniques, such as using a harmonizer effects pedal.

The fifth album, Azure, was released on June 5, 2020, with singles "LA Egypt", "Soft Soul", & "Never Tell The World". A live-recorded analog music video for "LA Egypt" was debuted on Melted Magazine. Under The Radar Magazine gave Azure a 7/10 and mentioned "the music tilts hard toward neo-psychedelia and blissed-out pop but bridges all gaps between the once-ubiquitous chillwave, the soundscapes of ambient music, and the melodies found in Krautrock and lo-fi. The group's latest LP, is 11 bright, burgeoning psychedelic pop songs borne from the seeds of bands like The Zombies, Can, and Dungen."

In April 2021, "Beaming" was released as a single, followed up by "Precious Star" in June, and "Exopalace" in November. In February 2022, a 4th single "Probable Cause", was released with an accompanying music video.

On August 26, 2022, the sixth LP, Cosmopolis, was released on Requiem Pour Un Twister.

In summer 2025 he toured with Norwegian psych-pop band Gold Celeste.

== Art ==
Lionel Williams has developed a collage art catalog that has received worldwide acclaim. His artwork was first exhibited at the Ugly Art Room's "All That Remains" show in Brooklyn in 2011, and the "Let the Sunshine In" exhibition at Mindpirates Gallery in Berlin in January 2012, during which he improvised with other musicians including Jochen Arbeit (Einstürzende Neubauten), Travis Stewart (Machinedrum), Miguel de Pedro (Kid 606) and Verity Susman (Electrelane). Williams' artwork was also featured in Dazed & Confused magazine's art issue in November 2012. In 2013, his work was exhibited under the title "Sri Neter" at the California Institute of the Arts.

== Video work ==
Williams has directed interactive & non-interactive music videos for other groups such as Tears for Fears, Medicine and Unknown Mortal Orchestra. A full list of video art and music videos is viewable on Williams' interactive website.

== Members ==
=== Members ===
- Lionel Williams – vocals, various instruments (2007–present)

=== Associated musicians ===
- Bryan Lee – drums (2007–2010)
- Calin Stephensen – bass (2007–2008)
- Craig Murray – bass (2008–2009)
- Nikita Arefkia – synth (2011–2013)
- James Lake – drums/synth (2011–2017)
- Ian Gibbs – various instruments (2011–2018)
- Billy Winger – bass/drums (2011–2018)
- Sam Chown — drums (2018–2021)
- Nick Logie — guitar/vocals (2020–present)
- Nathan Najera — guitar (2018–present)
- Eric Werner — drums (2022)
- Alan Connor - drums (2023–present)

== Discography ==
=== Studio albums ===
- Lemniscate (2012, No Pain in Pop/Salonislam)
- Into (2015, Company Records)
- Brunei (2016, Company Records)
- Opal (2018, Requiem Pour Un Twister)
- Azure (2020, Requiem Pour Un Twister)
- Cosmopolis (2022, Requiem Pour Un Twister)
- Aeterna (2023, Harmony)
- Polyhaven (2025, Harmony)
- Portasymphony (2025, Harmony)
- Star Harmony (2026, Harmony)

=== EPs ===
- Qoma & Aura - Unreleased '09-'10 (2010, self-released)
- Naked Sanctuary (2010, self-released)
- Trance Zen Dental Spa with Chaz Bundick (2014, Company Records)

=== Singles ===
- "Chroma Heart" (2012, Warmest Chord)
- "Teal Palm" (2012, Warmest Chord)
- "Higher Worlds" (2012, No Pain in Pop)
- "Harmonious Change" (2012, No Pain in Pop)
- "Stellarscope" (2013, No Pain in Pop)
- "World Soul" (2015, Company Records)
- "Riddles of the Sphinx" (2016, Company Records)
- "L'Quasar" (2016, Company Records)
- "Ode To Eternal" (2017, Harmony Records)
- "Pop Palace" (2017, Harmony Records)
- "Lansing" (2018, Requiem Pour Un Twister)
- "Noumena" (2018, Requiem Pour Un Twister)
- "LA Egypt" (2020, Requiem Pour Un Twister)
- "Soft Soul" (2020, Requiem Pour Un Twister)
- "Never Tell The World" (2020, Requiem Pour Un Twister)
- "Beaming" (2021, Requiem Pour Un Twister)
- "Precious Star" (2021, Requiem Pour Un Twister)
- "Exopalace" (2022, Requiem Pour Un Twister)
- "Probable Cause" (2022, Requiem Pour Un Twister)
