= Parallax (Atlas Sound album) =

Studio album by Atlas Sound
- Released: 7 November 2011
- Recorded: June 2011 at Rare Book Room Studios, Brooklyn, NY
- Genres: Pop; dream pop
- Length: 48:32
- Label: 4AD
- Producers: Bradford Cox, Nicolas Vernhes

Atlas Sound chronology
Logos (2009)	Parallax (2011)	Thanatos (2026)

Parallax is the third studio album from Bradford Cox's solo project Atlas Sound, released November 7, 2011 on 4AD. The album debuted at No. 97 on the Billboard 200 to critical acclaim.

== Album title ==
After Parallax was recorded, Bradford Cox was forced to continue touring with Deerhunter, which ended up being so stressful for Cox that it caused him to have a nervous breakdown. Cox related album's title to his lifestyle, saying in an interview with Rolling Stone:

It's all about parallax, man. Five years for one person is 20 for another, you know? It's like, if a car is coming towards you down a highway and you're going towards it, it's like this distortion of how fast things go by. And I guess my time as a musician has gone by so fast that I realized that I have no personal life. The other guys in Deerhunter, they all found things. And I just have monomania.

== Recording ==
Production duties were handled by Cox and previous Deerhunter producer Nicolas Vernhes. The album was assembled at the end of a Deerhunter tour and was mostly recorded at Nicholas Vernhes' studio, Rare Book Room Studios in Greenpoint, Brooklyn. Two of the album's tracks ("Flagstaff" and "Terra Incognita") were recorded by Cox himself in his hotel room at the Ace Hotel in New York City as a result of limited studio time. 4AD also launched a website, depicting an image of Cox in Manhattan's Central Park, similar to the artwork of his two previous releases, his face is obscured by a lens flare. The website lists the genre as 'Science Fiction'. Cox dedicated the album to the late Trish Keenan of Broadcast, who had died earlier in 2011.

In an interview with Spin, Cox described the recording of the album as, "Very exhausting to make, even though it was comfortable and detached. It is the loneliest record that I've ever made".

== Artwork ==
The artwork features a photograph of Cox taken by Mick Rock, who had previously shot photographs for albums such as Raw Power, The Madcap Laughs, and Transformer. Cox met Rock through Michael Stipe of R.E.M. and the two quickly became friends. The cover's artwork was meant to reflect the influence classic rock and rock and roll had on Cox when he recorded the album. Unlike previous Atlas Sound album covers, Parallax's cover did not feature faces obscured by a lens flare. By not covering his face with a flare, Cox felt that the album cover effectively conveyed the loneliness he experienced creating the album.

== Release ==
The album was announced on August 24, 2011. Prior the album's release, more than half the album's songs were made officially available for streaming and/or download. Two demos of "Mona Lisa" were originally released on the third volume of the Bedroom Databank series that Cox had released on the Deerhunter blog in 2010. Both "Te Amo" (originally known as "Untitled") and "Flagstaff" had appeared in live Atlas Sound sets for around a year prior to the release of Parallax.

"Terra Incognita" was the first track available to coincide with the album's announcement. "Te Amo", "Modern Aquatic Nightsongs", "Amplifiers", "The Shakes", "Lightworks", "Praying Man", and "Flagstaff", all followed. Some were made exclusively available through websites such as the online retailer Amazon, radio station KEXP's blog and music blogs Gorilla vs. Bear and Fluxblog. On November 2, 2011, the whole album was streamed on the New York Times website.

"Parallax", the album's first single, was released on October 24, 2011. It was backed with the b-side "Oh, Ricky".

== Reception ==
Professional ratings
Aggregate scores
Source	Rating
AnyDecentMusic?	8.1/10
Metacritic	82/100
Review scores
Source	Rating
AllMusic	4/5 stars
The A.V. Club	A−
The Guardian	4/5 stars
Mojo	4/5 stars
NME	8/10
Pitchfork	8.7/10
Q	4/5 stars
Rolling Stone	3.5/5 stars
Spin	9/10
Uncut	3/5 stars

Parallax received positive reviews from music critics. At Metacritic, which assigns a normalized rating out of 100 to reviews from mainstream critics, the album received an average score of 82, based on 34 reviews, indicating "Universal acclaim".

AllMusic writer Heather Phares awarded the album a grade of four stars out of five, writing: "It's a quietly satisfying album with a determined fragility that makes it all the more moving". Rolling Stone gave the album three-and-half-stars out of five and noted: "Cox values songwriting ahead of texture these days, and the effort is paying off". The A.V. Club's David Greenwald praised the album's more accessible sound, writing, "It's a brilliant feat: to make a record about distance, Cox has written the most effortlessly approachable music of his career". PopMatters writer Daniel Tebo gave the album a very positive review and rated it 9 out of 10 and wrote: "It's a fitting conclusion to a near perfect album that finds an artist expanding his musical palate without sacrificing an ounce of himself in the process". musicOMH writer, Max Raymond called it "Atlas Sound's best album to date" and said: "This is easily the most satisfying and rewarding set of songs that Cox has written in any of his projects and it'll be a tough ask to top it". Drowned in Sound was also positive regarding the album and said: "Moments of genuine marvel, each one craving its own flowery descriptives, come thick and fast". Spin's Marc Hogan gave it a very positive review, writing "A sci-fi tint shifts the perspective from Atlas Sound's usual layered introspection: Inner space now has become outer space". Tiny Mix Tapes writer Conrad Tao was also positive on the album and gave it four stars out of five and wrote: "Thankfully, such peeks of inhibition are brief, and Cox spends far more time confidently beckoning us into the glorious world he's created. For the first time, this is a place where we're to be cohabitants, not merely invitees". Loren Auda Poin from Filter gave it a positive review with 83% and wrote: "With each Atlas Sound release, the sonic effects become more interwoven, intense and impressive, and truly no one else could be writing these songs the way Cox does". Under The Radar was also positive on the album and rated it 7 out of 10 and wrote: "While too restrained overall to match the tie-dyed brilliance of Logos, Parallax's subtle charms demonstrate that Cox's musical id is still alive and kicking".

Several critics noted the album's more consistent sound. Clash magazine described the album as "a more refined listen" compared to Cox's previous album, Logos. Nick Neyland of Pitchfork gave the album a "Best New Music" designation, writing "Parallax feels like a more complete work than any other Atlas Sound record, with the differences between the songs less distinct and everything flowing together more naturally". No Ripcord's Andrew Baer also praised the album's consistency, writing "Cox sounds comfortable and confident, and has made the best solo album of his prolific career". BBC Music called Parallax "Cox's most coherent record to date", continuing: "it's harder to spotlight individual tracks, but individual settings stand out". Jeremy D. Larson of Consequence of Sound awarded the album with four-and-half-stars out of five and said: "What makes Parallax a fully realized album is, in contrast to its compact musicality, the expanses and voids Cox explores".

Not all reviews were entirely positive, though. Sputnikmusic writer Robin Smith was more ambivalent to the album, writing "Parallax, unrealised masterpiece or not, sounds like the man in his bedroom with a thousand songs to leave unexplained". Jonathan Donaldson of The Phoenix wrote "Yet even when relying less on atmospheric synths and playing with a full-band set up ("The Shakes"), Parallax misses early rock's tautness and grit". Daniel Becker of Dusted Reviews felt the album was "sparer than usual, flimsier, subtler," writing "These songs aren’t weighty enough, individually or cumulatively, to leave an imprint — they fail to make a world out of themselves, leaving instead snatches of place, time of day, lighting conditions".

Pitchfork placed the album at number 18 on its list of the "Top 50 albums of 2011".

== Track listing ==
All tracks are written by Bradford Cox.

No.	Title	Length
1.	"The Shakes"	2:57
2.	"Amplifiers"	2:49
3.	"Te Amo"	4:14
4.	"Parallax"	2:46
5.	"Modern Aquatic Nightsongs"	4:09
6.	"Mona Lisa" (featuring Andrew VanWyngarden)	3:06
7.	"Praying Man"	2:48
8.	"Doldrums"	4:35
9.	"Angel Is Broken"	4:58
10.	"Terra Incognita"	6:25
11.	"Flagstaff"	5:54
12.	"Lightworks"	3:56

Japanese bonus tracks
No.	Title	Length
13.	"Quark Part 1"	7:47
14.	"Quark Part 2"	2:42

== Personnel ==
Credits adapted from AllMusic:

- Bradford Cox - Electric bass, Collage, Drums, Guitar, Acoustic guitar, Electric guitar, Instrumentation, Keyboards, Organ, Percussion, Piano, Rhythm Box, Sequencers, Synthesizer, Synthesizer bass, Tapes, Telecaster, Treatments, Vocal Drone, Vocals, Wurlitzer
- Paul McPherson - Cabasa, Hi-hat, Wood block
- Carrie-Anne Murphy - Saxophone
- Andrew VanWyngarden - Organ, Piano, Vocals (Background)

Production

- Bradford Cox - engineer, composer, producer, programming
- Nicolas Vernhes - engineer, mixing, producer, programming

Additional personnel

- Mick Rock - cover photo, photography
- Liz Vao - photo production
- Kari Bauce - grooming

== Charts ==
Chart (2011)	Peak position
U.S. Billboard 200	97
U.S. Independent Albums	17
U.S. Top Rock Albums	20
U.S. Top Alternative Albums	13
