= The Glow (Gold Celeste album) =

Studio album by Gold Celeste
- Released: 11 September 2015
- Genre: psychedelic pop
- Length: 42:11
- Label: Riot Factory

The Glow is the debut album by Norwegian psychedelic pop band Gold Celeste. It was released on 11 September 2015 on Riot Factory.

== Composition and recording ==
When asked where the album's name comes from the band said "the glow every human being is carrying, whether they’re aware of it or not."

== Critical reception ==
The album has been well received by critics. Nordic Music said it was a "dream pop style album with melodies, lovely layers of sound and interesting lyrics that should make you think, and have far more depth than you might imagine at first listen." The Line of Best fit said the album "occupies the middle ground somewhere between the ephemeral and the tangible - a sonically woven tapestry that's interested predominantly in the human condition". The Edge Magazine called it a "sophisticated statement sound of soft psychedelia with unhurried lyrics and a dreamy tone in a debut is a rarity. It sounds like a film soundtrack, and its length lends itself to fully entrancing listeners."

Professional ratings
Review scores
Source	Rating
Nordic Music	7.5/10
The Line of Best Fit	8/10
The Edge Magazine	4/5 stars

== Track listing ==
All tracks are written by Gold Celeste.

No.	Title	Length
1.	"Can of Worms"	6:51
2.	"But a Poem"	1:08
3.	"Open your Eyes"	4:45
4.	"The Dreamers"	4:46
5.	"Grand New Spin"	3:35
6.	"Time of Your Life"	3:26
7.	"Pastures"	0:51
8.	"Is This What You Can Not Do"	4:46
9.	"You and I"	4:31
10.	"On the Brink"	0:55
11.	"The Start of Something Beautiful"	6:31
Total length:		42:11

== Personnel ==
Gold Celeste

- Simen Hallset - vocals, bass, keyboards
- Eirik Fidjeland - backing vocals, guitar, keyboards
- Petter Andersen - drums

Additional personnel

- Karl Klaseie - mastering
- Benedikte Olsen - artwork
