= Selfish Things =

Rock band from Toronto

- Origin: Toronto, Ontario, Canada
- Genres: Alternative rock; indie rock
- Years active: 2015–2026
- Label: Pure Noise Records
- Members: Alex Biro; Mike Ticar; Cam Snooks
- Past members: Jordan Trask; Matt Johnston
- Website: www.selfishthingsband.com

Selfish Things are a Canadian alternative rock band from Toronto, Ontario. They formed in 2016 and on 20 September 2019 released their first full length studio album, Logos, via Pure Noise Records.

Their sound has been described as alternative rock, combining Simple Plan’s pop punk with Mallory Knox's heavier sounds.

== History ==
Lead singer Alex Biro started the group in 2015, after parting ways with his old band in Los Angeles and moving back to his parents' basement, where he began working on new music. The other members joined a year later in the summer of 2016.

The band's name is a reference to the lyrics of Jimmy Eat World's song "23". "I was deciding whether I still wanted to play music and I heard that line and thought it was beautiful", recalled Biro.

On 25 July 2015, Selfish Things released their debut single, "Spooky Action at a Distance". The song is about dealing with suffering and self-hate, "for anyone who’s desired the truth, longed to be loved or searched endlessly for themselves".

On 14 June 2016, they premiered the single "Good Morning, Miss America", and "We All Die Young (Oh My Southern Guard Flew West)" on 25 August.

In September 2017, the band supported Simple Plan on a Canadian tour.

After teasing fans with the EP Six Songs in December 2017, the band released the EP Vertical Love on 16 March 2018. It was produced by James Paul Wisner, who worked with Paramore and Dashboard Confessional, and the artwork was created by Daniel P. Carter, host of the BBC Radio 1's Rock Show. Including singles "1435", "Rust Cohle Never Sleeps", "8147 Mulholland Terrace" and "Hangman", the EP was inspired by HBO series True Detective. Alex Biro stated that he "spent day after day watching and eventually emulating the ideological values Rust Cohle portrayed throughout the series. His nihilism, egoistic sense of identity and viewpoint on people of lesser “intellect” fed my shadow self".

In May 2018, Selfish Things played at Slam Dunk Festival in the UK, and from July to August they joined the Spill Canvas for a North American tour.

On 25 May 2018, they released the EP Vertical Love // Reimagined, with different versions of three tracks previously included in Vertical Love, and a cover of Drake's song "Marvin's Room".

On 26 October 2018, the band premiered a new single, "Flood", along with a music video. About the song, Alex Biro said "I felt like I needed to find a way to talk about human complacency in the face of destruction beyond gun violence. Our species has this off-putting, innate ability to let things go to shit so long as it doesn’t directly impact us as individuals."

On 22 February 2019, they released "Drained", a song featuring William Ryan Key (lead singer of Yellowcard), and they also joined him for a tour across the US the following month.

On 26 June 2019, they revealed the single "Pride" with an exclusive premiere on Kerrang!. According to Biro, the song "defines what it feels like to be the odd man out in a place you don’t belong".

At the beginning of August, the band announced that they completed the recording of their debut studio album Logos, and premiered the single "Hole". The album was released on 20 September 2019 via Pure Noise Records, and was preceded by the single "Blood" featuring Andy Leo of Crown the Empire. Another guest on the record is Underoath's singer Spencer Chamberlain.

On 7 November 2020, the band announced that they were going on an indefinite hiatus, citing their need to focus on "economic stability" as a result of the COVID-19 pandemic.

On 20 September 2021, the band reactivated their Instagram account and announced that the band was back together.

On 17 June 2022, the band released an acoustic/orchestral single exclusively on YouTube entitled "Throw Me in the Sun" featuring dancer and performance artist Emma Portner. The release was set to an evocative looped animation from animator Sydney Jones, drawing widespread praise from fans. As of mid-2022, the band have announced that they have begun recording their second LP, tentatively titled The Cracks in My Being Is Where the Light Breaks Through. Biro described the album as a significant departure from past work and cited complete ownership of the band's masters as a major reason for not resigning with a record label.

== Members ==
- Alex Biro – lead vocals, guitar, piano
- Mike Ticar – lead guitar, backing vocals
- Cam Snooks – rhythm guitar
- Burton Lavery – bass
- Jordan Trask – drums

== Discography ==
=== Studio albums ===
- Logos (2019)
- Receptivity (2026)

=== EPs ===
- Six Songs (2017)
- Vertical Love (2018)
- Vertical Love // Reimagined (2018)

=== Singles ===
- "Happy Xmas (War Is Over)" (2019)
- "Torn (Alternate Version)" (2020)
