= Walkabout (Atlas Sound song) =

Song by Atlas Sound featuring Noah Lennox

from the album Logos
- Language: English
- Published: October 20, 2009
- Released: July 17, 2009
- Genre: Ambient; dream pop
- Length: 3:29
- Label: Kranky
- Producer: Bradford Cox

"Walkabout" is a song by Atlas Sound featuring Noah Lennox of Animal Collective. It appears as the third track on his second studio album Logos. Although never released as a single, it is often seen as the lead single as it was the first song officially released from the album.

Upon initial release, Pitchfork included it in their best new tracks section and rated it as 34th best song of the year.

The track utilizes an extensive sample of "What Am I Going to Do" by 60s garage rock band The Dovers.

== Background ==
The song came about when Atlas Sound began to tour as the opener for Animal Collective in Europe in 2008. In an interview with Pitchfork, Cox stated:

I toured for a period in Europe with Animal Collective, whose band dynamic was very inspirational to be around. On the bus, we often played improvised iPod games. We would take turns formulating a theme or unifying concept and then play three songs. The goal would be for everyone to try and figure out the theme. During one of these games, someone played "What Am I Going to Do" by The Dovers. I was amazed at the hook-- a weird organ thing with drums and electric bass. I mentioned to Noah [Lennox] that someone should really sample that riff. He agreed and he taught me a little about sampling and matching up beats. This ended up as the collaborative effort 'Walkabout'.

== Reception ==
Pitchfork commented on the change of tone in the song compared to Cox's previous 2008 album, Let the Blind Lead Those Who Can See but Cannot Feel, saying, "but where Cox seems to use recording as an escape hatch, a way out of a dark and scary place, Lennox seems like he's already turned that first corner and meets the world with a tentative optimism. "Walkabout" is certainly closer to Lennox's point of view, as it bubbles over with good feeling".

The Fader gave a positive review of the song, and commented on the song's themes of maturing, "[Cox] generally seems to be focused on moving on, becoming an adult, or at least acknowledging that he can't be a child anymore".

== Live renditions ==
Although the song is mainly composed of samples, Cox rarely uses a sampler to recreate it during live performances. When Cox toured Logos in late 2009, the song was played live at each show with The Selmanaires, the opening band for the tour, accompanying Cox.

Since early 2010, Cox simply plays the song solo with an acoustic guitar featuring large improvised sections and occasionally a drum machine. Cox first utilized this setup when performing the song during a one-off show at the Natural History Museum in Los Angeles in January 2010.
