= Gold Celeste =

Psychedelic pop band from Oslo, Norway

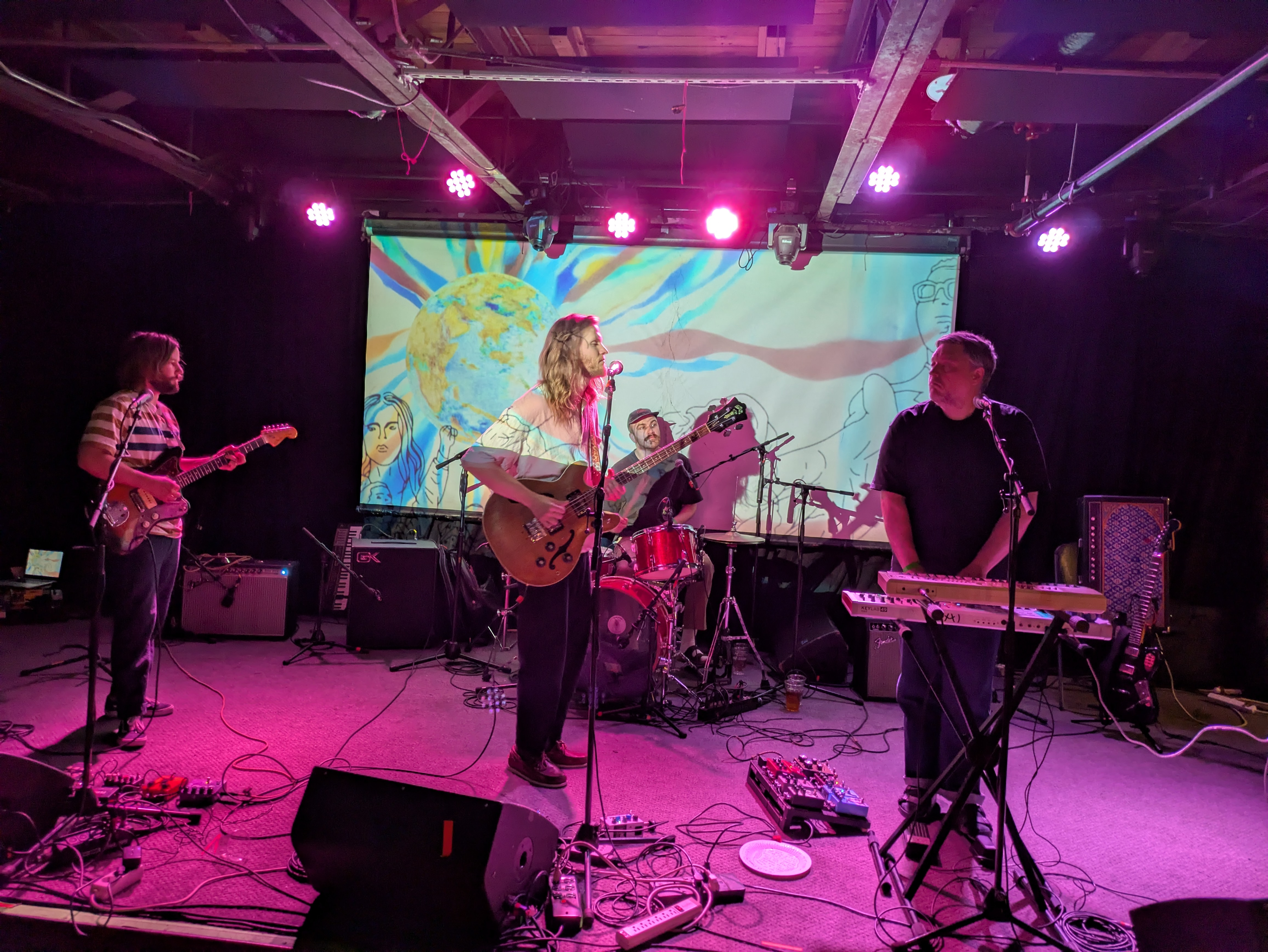
- Gold Celeste playing at Urban Lounge in Salt Lake City, Utah, United States on July 22 2025

Background information
- Origin: Oslo, Norway
- Genres: psychedelic pop, lo-fi
- Years active: 2014-present
- Labels: Riot Factory
- Spinoff of: Angelica's Elegy
- Members: Eirik Fidjeland; Simen Hallset
- Past members: Petter Andersen

Gold Celeste are a psychedelic pop band from Oslo, Norway. They have two studio albums and two extended plays (EPs).

== History ==
The band met in Trondheim while studying music. Hallset and Fidjeland were part of a similar band Angelica's Elegy that released a studio album named Gold Celeste. Gold Celeste is sometimes referred to as an alias of Angelica's Elegy.

They recorded their debut album under the Gold Celeste name, The Glow in 2015 in the studio which bassist/vocalist Simen Hallset ran. Shortly after the release of the album they also released a stand-alone single "The Wonder of Love".

In 2019 the band released single "The Best Trip" ahead of their second album The Gentle Maverik. Then in 2020 they released the EP Common Ground.

In summer 2025 they went on their first ever North American tour with Vinyl Williams. They released the Rendezvous EP on 30 June 2025. On 18 July 2025 the band recorded a KEXP session that released on 17 September.

== Musical style ==
They have been described as a "psych-pop band inspired by crispy lo-fi sounds from the 60s" and "Fusing shoegaze textures to psychedelic tendencies". Their music is said to have "dreamy hypnotic layers of psychedelic melody".

Genres include "psych, indie, soul, jazz, pop and even a bit of dream".

They have listed Beach House and My Bloody Valentine as influences.

They have been compared to Tame Impala, Connan Mockasin, and Beach House.

== Band members ==
=== Current members ===
- Simen Hallset - Vocals, Bass, Keyboards
- Eirik Fidjeland - Backing Vocals, Guitar, Keyboards

=== Touring musicians ===
- Peter Hiley - Guitar, Keyboards, Backing Vocals (2025)
- Eirik Kirkemyr - Drums, Backing Vocals (2025)

=== Past members ===
- Petter Andersen - Drums

=== Past Touring musicians ===
- Torstein Holum - Backing Vocals, Percussion

== Discography ==
=== Studio albums ===
- The Glow (2015)
- The Gentle Maverik (2019)

=== Extended plays ===
- Common Ground (2020)
- Rendezvous EP (2025)
