= Player Piano (album) =

Studio album by Memory Tapes
- Released: 5 July 2011
- Genre: Chillwave, electronica
- Length: 39:48
- Label: Carpark

Memory Tapes chronology
Seek Magic (2009)	Player Piano (2011)	Grace/Confusion (2012)

Player Piano is the second studio album of Dayve Hawke, under the alias of Memory Tapes. It was released July 5, 2011. The cover art features an image of a gouache painting by Kazuki Takamatsu.

== Reception ==
Professional ratings
Review scores
Source	Rating
Drowned in Sound	8/10 stars
Pitchfork Media	(6.0/10)

Player Piano has a review score of 6.8 on the website AnyDecentMusic? and a metacritic score of 67 out of 100, indicating generally favorable reviews.

== Track listing ==
All music is composed by Memory Tapes.

No.	Title	Length
1.	"Musicbox(In)"	0:42
2.	"Wait in the Dark"	4:17
3.	"Today is Our Life"	5:15
4.	"Yes I Know"	3:42
5.	"Offers"	4:00
6.	"Humming"	2:47
7.	"Sun Hits"	3:36
8.	"Worries"	5:28
9.	"Fell Thru Ice"	2:09
10.	"Fell Thru Ice II"	3:06
11.	"Trance Sisters"	3:59
12.	"Musicbox(Out)"	0:57
