= Seek Magic =

Studio album by Memory Tapes
- Released: August 24, 2009
- Genre: Chillwave; dance-pop
- Length: 40:20
- Label: Something in Construction

Memory Tapes chronology
Seek Magic (2009)	Player Piano (2011)

Seek Magic is the debut studio album by American musician Dayve Hawke under the alias Memory Tapes. It was released on August 24, 2009 by the label Something in Construction.

The cover art features an image of the painting Mirage by Tomory Dodge.

== Reception ==
Professional ratings
Aggregate scores
Source	Rating
AnyDecentMusic?	8.0/10
Metacritic	86/100
Review scores
Source	Rating
AllMusic	4/5 stars
DIY	9/10
Drowned in Sound	9/10
MusicOMH	4/5 stars
NME	8/10
Now	4/5
Pitchfork	8.3/10
Q	4/5 stars
The Sunday Times	4/5 stars
Uncut	4/5 stars

At Metacritic, which assigns a normalized rating out of 100 to reviews from mainstream publications, Seek Magic received an average score of 86, based on 9 reviews, indicating "universal acclaim". The album has an 8.0 rating on review aggregator website AnyDecentMusic? and is certified an "ADM Chart Topper".

Seek Magic was awarded the title of "Best New Music" by Pitchfork, with critic Ian Cohen praising the album as "achingly gorgeous dance-pop that captures both the joy of nostalgia and the melancholic sense that we're grasping for good times increasingly out of reach". In a 2019 retrospective piece on chillwave for Stereogum, Cohen cited Seek Magic as "probably the best" chillwave album released in 2009, "and, by definition, probably the greatest chillwave album of all time".

== Track listing ==
All music is composed by Memory Tapes.

No.	Title	Length
1.	"Swimming Field"	3:30
2.	"Bicycle"	5:19
3.	"Green Knight"	4:33
4.	"Pink Stones"	3:54
5.	"Stop Talking"	7:04
6.	"Graphics"	6:31
7.	"Plain Material"	4:50
8.	"Run Out"	4:39

Rough Trade bonus disc
No.	Title	Length
1.	"Bicycle" (Horrors Cosmic Dub)	5:54
2.	"Graphics" (Remodel Edit)	3:35
3.	"Walk Me Home"	16:53
4.	"Treeship"	22:20

Notes

- On vinyl pressings of the album, the running order of "Pink Stones" and "Stop Talking" is reversed.
