= Bishop Manogue High School =

Bishop Manogue Catholic High School

Location
- 110 Bishop Manogue Drive; Reno, Nevada 89511; United States; 39°25′25″N 119°45′52″W

Information
- Type: Private, Coeducational
- Religious affiliation: Roman Catholic
- Established: 1948
- Oversight: Roman Catholic Diocese of Reno
- President: Br. Christopher Hall, C.F.C, Ed.D.
- Principal: Brianne Thoreson
- Staff: 86
- Grades: 9–12
- Enrollment: 640 (2014)
- Colors: Green and Gold
- Athletics conference: Sierra League
- Team name: Miners
- Accreditation: Northwest Accreditation Commission
- Newspaper: Miner Detail
- Website: http://www.bishopmanogue.org

Bishop Manogue Catholic High School is a Catholic high school in Reno, Nevada. It is the only Catholic high school in the Roman Catholic Diocese of Reno.

== History ==
The Catholic high school was established in Reno, Nevada in 1948 and named for the first Bishop of Sacramento, Patrick Manogue. In 1957 the school moved from its location off of Mill Street to 400 Bartlett Street, off of Valley Road, adjacent to the University of Nevada, and was known as "The School on the Hill." Bishop Manogue Catholic High School remained at this location for nearly fifty years before being relocated in 2004 to a site in southwest Reno and the graduating class of 2004 was called "the Last Class on the Hill" to conclude 46 years at 400 Bartlett Street. The 1957 Bishop Manogue was torn down after it was purchased by the University of Nevada and the site is now home to an athletic center.

=== Presidents and Principals ===
President	Years	Principal	Years
		Rev. Joseph Linde	1948–1954
		Rev. Casimir Paul, CSV	1954–1958
		Rev. Robert Despars	1958–1962
		Msgr. Donald Carmody	1962–1969
		Rev. George Wolf	1969–1975
		Rev. Phillip O'Donnell	1975–1976
		Rev. Ralph Drendel, SJ	1976–1982
		Br. Matthew Cunningham, FSR	1982–1988
1992: position created		Br. Ignatius Foster, FSR	1988–1992
Br. Ignatius Foster, FSR	1992	Robert Sullivan	1992–1999
Br. Matthew Cunningham, FSR	1993–1996	Robert Sullivan	1992–1999
Carl Shaff	1996–1999	Robert Sullivan	1992–1999
James Williams	2000–2002	Richard Squires	1999–2001
James Williams	2000–2002	Timothy Petersen	2001–2007
Timothy Petersen	2003–2006	Timothy Petersen	2001–2007
Rev. Charles Durante	2007	Timothy Petersen	2001–2007
M. James Toner	2007–2011	Timothy Jaureguito	2007–2013
Christopher Whitty	2011–2013	Timothy Jaureguito	2007–2013
M. James Toner, Interim	2013	Lauren McBride, Interim	2013
Maureen Kachurak	2013–2015	Richard Harris	2013–2016
Jack Trainor	2016	Brianne Thoreson	2016–Present
Yvonne Anxo, Interim	2017	Brianne Thoreson	2016–Present
Matthew Schambari	2017–2024	Brianne Thoreson	2016–Present
Rev. Charles Durante	2024	Brianne Thoreson	2016–Present
Br. Christopher Hall, CFC, Ed.D.	2024–present	Brianne Thoreson	2016–Present

[3]

== Athletics ==
Manogue's school colors are green and gold, and its mascot is the Miner, in tribute to the school's namesake, Bishop Patrick Manogue, who was also a miner.

=== Nevada Interscholastic Activities Association State Championships ===
- Baseball – 1984, 1985, 1986, 1999, 2000, 2002, 2003, 2004
- Basketball (Girls) – 2001, 2003
- Basketball (Boys) – 2000, 2001
- Cross Country (Boys) – 1980, 1983
- Cross Country (Girls) – 1979, 1980, 1983, 1993
- Golf (Girls) – 2008
- Swimming (Boys) – 1990
- Volleyball (Girls) – 2008
- Football – 1957, 1958, 1970, 1971, 1972, 1975, 1979, 1982, 1987, 1988, 1999, 2002, 2003, 2023, 2024
- Golf (Boys) 2000, 2001, 2013
- Skiing (Boys) 2013, 2014

== Notable alumni ==
- Don J. Briel – Founder of the Catholic Studies project
- Matt Gallagher – author and Iraq war veteran
- Heidi Gansert – state legislator
- Kevin Jepsen – baseball player
- Brian Sandoval – Governor of Nevada
- James David Santini – former U.S. Representative from Nevada
- Joe Wieland – Pitcher for the San Diego Padres
- Susan Desmond-Hellmann – Oncologist, UCSF chancellor from 2009 to 2013, and CEO of the Bill & Melinda Gates Foundation from 2013 to 2020. Appointed to President's Council of Advisors on Science and Technology in 2021.
