= Center for Catholic Studies =

Research institution in Minneapolis, US

The Center for Catholic Studies (University of St. Thomas, Minnesota) is a research institute founded in 1992, which aims to cultivate an interdisciplinary Catholic vision at the crossroads of faith and reason, spirituality and action, and Catholic thought and secular life. The Center collaborates with the Department of Catholic Studies in the College of Arts and Sciences.

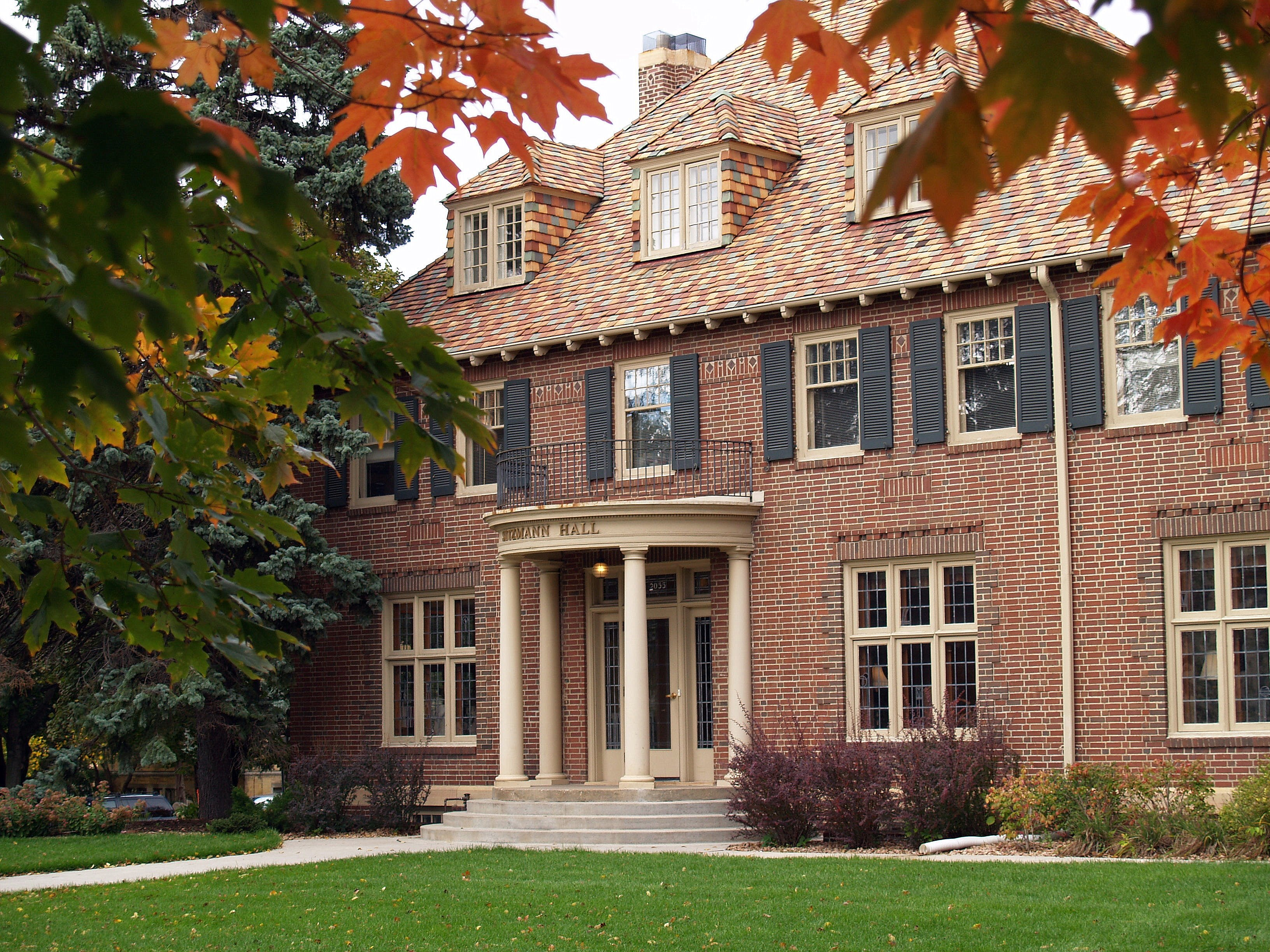
Sitzmann Hall, home of the Center for Catholic Studies at the University of St. Thomas

== Integration within the University of St. Thomas ==
The Center for Catholic Studies and the Department of Catholic Studies are part of the UST's College of Arts and Sciences. They maintain a special relationship with the School of Law, the Opus College of Business, Campus Ministry, and the St. John Vianney Seminary.

The Center and Department have also collaborated with a wide variety of units across the campus, including the Saint Paul Seminary School of Divinity, the Muslim-Christian Dialogue Center, the Family Business Center, the Jay Phillips Center for Interfaith Learning, Academic Affairs, the Aquinas Chair of Theology and philosophy, the Luann Dummer Center for Women, student clubs, and a number of academic departments.

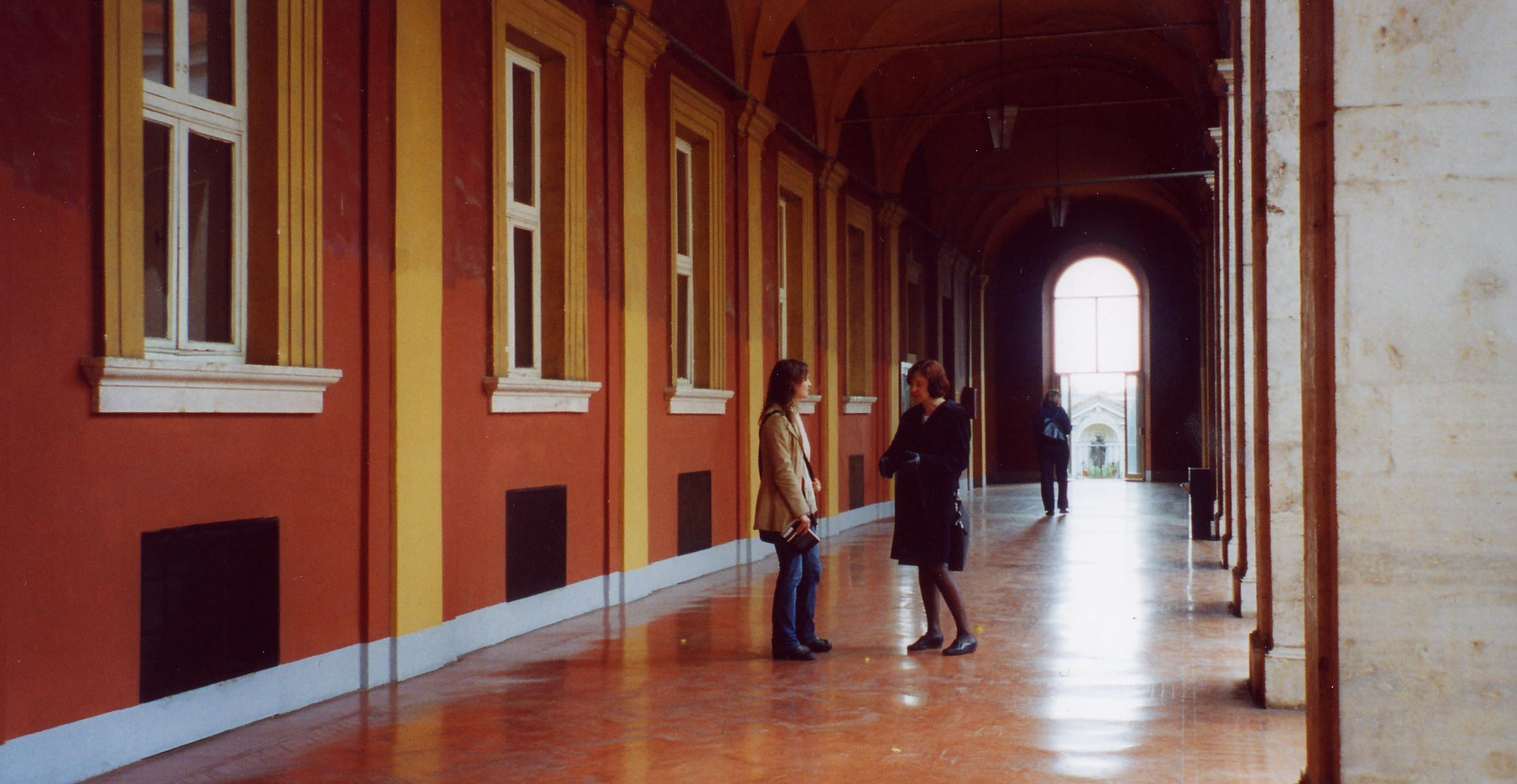
Cloister of the Convent of Saints Dominic and Sixtus, Pontifical University of St. Thomas Aquinas

== The Project: Department and Center ==
The Catholic Studies project at the University of St. Thomas is composed of a department and a center, which have distinct roles but are complementary in their relationship.

=== Department of Catholic Studies ===
The Department of Catholic Studies is responsible for undergraduate and graduate degree programs. The department also manages study-abroad programs, recruiting and admissions, scholarships and fellowships, social activities for students, and alumni relations.

=== Center for Catholic Studies ===
The Center for Catholic Studies oversees the work of three major institutes and a quarterly journal as well as lectures and faculty development programs:

- The John A. Ryan Institute for Catholic Social Thought
- The Murphy Institute for Catholic Thought, Law, and Public Policy
- The Habiger Institute for Catholic Leadership
- Logos: A Journal of Catholic Thought and Culture

The Center is where students, faculty, and staff study the Church's intellectual, spiritual, moral and social contributions to human culture. Some of its activities include:

- Faculty development programs (a Catholic Intellectual Tradition seminar for new faculty, a Mission Driven Seminar for Opus College of Business and summer seminars for faculty across the university).
- A series of "Hot Topics: Cool Talks" debating topics such as religious liberty, immigration reform and redefining marriage.
- A variety of research projects (for the Holy See Mission to the UN in Geneva, for the Pontifical Council for Justice and Peace, and with other Catholic universities).
- Publications (its quarterly journal, Logos: A Journal of Catholic Thought and Culture, has been published for 18 years with 500 essays viewed more than a quarter of a million times through Project Muse).
- A variety of student leadership retreats, formation programs, and professional mentorships.

More than 70 percent of the Center's activities are funded through endowments, annual donations, foundations, and grants.

== Rome Program: The Bernardi Campus ==
The Bernardi campus hosts a semester-long experience that integrates academic study, cultural engagement, spiritual formation, and community living. Approximately 30–35 Catholic Studies students study in Rome each semester, and about two-thirds of the majors and minors will spend a semester there. Students take classes at the Angelicum, the Dominican university in Rome where Pope John Paul II earned his doctorate. A highlight of the program is Wednesday Community Night, which includes liturgy, dinner, and often a prominent guest. The students also study art and architecture, go on guided excursions throughout Italy, and have opportunities to serve the poor in Rome. Funded by the Bernardi family in 2000, the Bernardi Campus provides the Catholic Studies Abroad program with a permanent residence in Rome.

A student receives a blessing from Pope John Paul II.

== Impact on the university, church, and world ==
With more than 1,200 alumni, Catholic Studies' students have become leaders in the Church and the world:

- Many are physicians, attorneys, engineers, scientists, professors, business leaders, principals, and teachers
- More than 100 have been ordained to the priesthood
- More than 20 women have entered religious life

The University of St. Thomas Catholic Studies project has been a model for new Catholic Studies programs at more than 90 universities worldwide.

The Catholic Studies project currently has a $15 million endowment, and 55.2 percent of Catholic Studies alumni have donated to the program since its creation in 1992.

The Center for Catholic Studies commemorated its 25th anniversary at an evening gala on 8 December 2018. More than 560 students, alumni, faculty and staff, benefactors, and friends attended the celebration, which featured a keynote address from auxiliary Bishop Robert Barron of the Archdiocese of Los Angeles.
