= Logos (Selfish Things album) =

Studio album by Selfish Things
- Released: 20 September 2019
- Label: Pure Noise Records
- Producer: Drew Fulk

Selfish Things chronology
Vertical Love // Reimagined (2018)	Logos (2019)

Singles from Logos
- 1. "Flood" Released: 26 October 2018; 2. "Drained (ft. William Ryan Key)" Released: 22 February 2019; 3. "Pride" Released: 28 June 2019; 4. "Hole" Released: 4 August 2019; 5. "Blood" Released: 30 August 2019; 6. "Mind" Released: 20 September 2019

Logos is the debut full-length studio album by Canadian alternative rock band Selfish Things, released on 20 September 2019 through Pure Noise Records. The album was produced by Drew Fulk and it features Andy Leo of Crown the Empire, former Yellowcard frontman William Ryan Key and Underoath's Spencer Chamberlain.

== Background ==
Throughout 2018, Selfish Things were working on their debut album while being on the road to promote their EP Vertical Love.

Lead singer Alex Biro chose the title months before the release: "I’ve been incredibly fixated by Carl Jung, the psychoanalyst and his grand interpretation of life and the world. To achieve logos is to truly ascend. The whole album revolves around that idea and concept. I had been having a hard time coming up with a name and then I was reading The Red Book and came across that. It just stuck."

He explains the idea behind the record: "I want people to know that there is strength in your faults. It’s just as important to suffer as it is to find moments of joy and happiness. Darkness and light need one another."

== Release and promotion ==
On 26 October 2018, the band released the single, "Flood". Biro explains: "I felt like I needed to find a way to talk about human complacency in the face of destruction beyond gun violence. Our species has this off-putting, innate ability to let things go to shit so long as it doesn’t directly impact us as individuals."

On 22 February 2019, they revealed the single "Drained", that features William Ryan Key, former singer of Yellowcard.

On 26 June 2019, they released "Pride", a song that "defines what it feels like to be the odd man out in a place you don’t belong."

On 4 August 2019, the band announced the details of Logos, and they premiered the single "Hole", followed by "Blood" on 30 August. "Blood" features Andy Leo of Crown the Empire on vocals.

On release day, Selfish Things premiered the single "Mind", accompanied by a music video.

== Critical reception ==
The album has received positive reviews from critics: it has been regarded as an intimate record with a focus on human feelings and vulnerability with a "fusion of sound from modern punk, to new age rock, to emo pop-ballad slow burners". At the same time, it has been noted that the execution of the tracks is far from perfect, as they are "in need of much more development" with an "amount of potential that doesn’t feel lived up to whatsoever".

== Track listing ==
No.	Title	Length
1.	"Flood"	3:33
2.	"Blood (featuring Andy Leo)"	3:19
3.	"Rowen"	3:43
4.	"Pride"	3:36
5.	"Synaptic"	3:03
6.	"Torn (featuring Spencer Chamberlain)"	4:31
7.	"Hole"	3:51
8.	"Crutch"	3:39
9.	"Drained (featuring William Ryan Key)"	3:41
10.	"Mind"	3:06
11.	"Youth"	4:02
Total length:		40:00

== Personnel ==
- Alex Biro - vocals, guitar, piano
- Mike Ticar - lead guitar, backing vocals
- Cam Snooks - rhythm guitar
- Jordan Trask - drums
