= Logo Software =

Turkish business software company

Logo Software San. ve Tic. A.Ş.
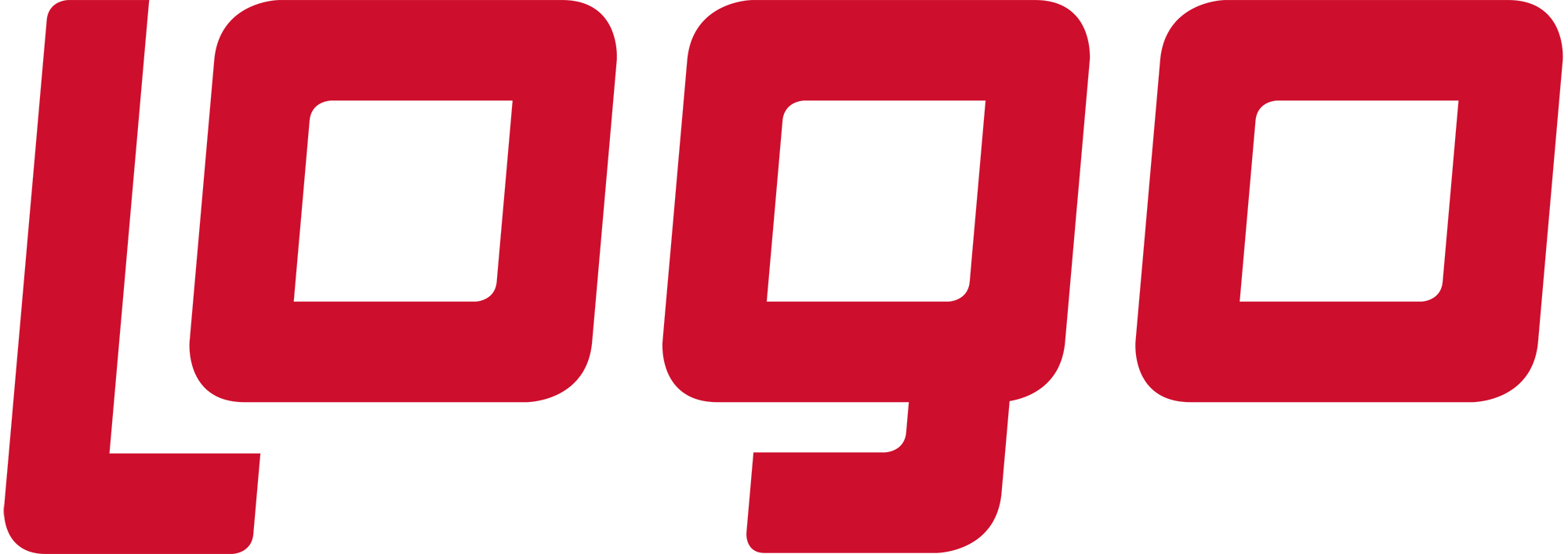
- Trade name: Logo Software
- Company type: Public
- Traded as: BİST: LOGO
- Industry: Enterprise software; Business software; Cloud computing; Computer hardware; Consulting
- Founded: July 1, 1984; 41 years ago
- Founder: M. Tuğrul Tekbulut
- Headquarters: Gebze, Kocaeli, Turkey
- Key people: M. Tuğrul Tekbulut (Chairman); M. Buğra Koyuncu (Vice chairman and CEO)
- Services: Applications; Cloud
- Operating income: ▲766,765,692₺ (2021)
- Net income: ▲264,649,959₺ (2021)
- Total assets: ▲1.807.471.818₺ (2021)
- Total equity: ▲833.505.390₺ (2021)
- Owner: Logo Teknoloji ve Yatırım A.Ş.: %33,63; Public: %66,37
- Number of employees: 1,500+ (December 2021)
- Subsidiaries: Total Soft (Romania); ABS (Romania); ABS FS (Romania); Logo FS GmbH (Germany); Logo Infosoft (India); Peoplise (Turkey)
- Website: logo.com.tr/en www.captainbiz.com

Logo Software San. ve Tic. A.Ş. is a Turkish business software company based in Gebze, Kocaeli. The company was founded in 1984, and was officially established in 1986. Logo Yazılım has more than 1,500 employees and over 1,000 business partners in 7 different locations in 4 different countries. It started developing Logo Paas in 2015 as part of its servitization strategy and offers cloud applications through this platform. Logo Yazılım also provides digital transformation consultancy and special project management services.

In 2000, Logo Yazılım completed its initial public offering (IPO) and was the first IT company to go public in Turkey. The company is traded on Borsa Istanbul under the code LOGO and currently has a free float percentage rate of 66.37%. The company was the first software company to be included in "Turquality", the Turkish Ministry of Trade's branding program. Logo ranked 67th on the list of "Turkey's Most Valuable Brands" according to the 2022 report by Brand Finance, which is a brand evaluation company.

== History ==
=== Foundation and early years (1984–2000) ===
Launched on July 1, 1984, by eight young engineers, Logo Yazılım was one of Turkey's first start-ups and was officially founded and registered on March 5, 1986. In the same year, Logo introduced Logo Commercial System (LTS) to users and released many MS-DOS and Windows-based products in the following years. The first version of Logo accounting programs, LKS - Logo Classic Series, is the predecessor of today's GO application. Following the LKS program running on the MS-DOS operating system, Logo Classic Series 2 marked the beginning of the current versions, in which Microsoft-based data is kept on Microsoft SQL Server. Logo Gold was Logo's first ERP application developed to be optimized with the MS-DOS operating system using the Btrieve database, and was launched in 1992. Following this application, Logo Gold Open, the predecessor of Tiger which is used today, was presented using Windows operating system and MS SQL.

Focusing on expanding service areas, Logo Yazılım founded Logomotif Company in 1996 to design products for the education and entertainment industry. Logomotif was a versatile company that focused on designing products at home and localizing products of foreign companies abroad. For the digitalization of education, Logomotif released many educational packages such as "Perfect English" and "Genç Gezginin Dünya Turu", which were sold through CD-ROMs. One of the products Logomotif developed in parallel with the widespread use of computers was the ten-finger typing training under the name LOGO 10 Finger. Within the scope of this ten-finger typing training, studies focusing on both F and Q keyboard types were included, and advertisements and posters were used to popularize the training. In this context, the advertisement prepared by Manajans with the motto of fingers dancing on the keys won the Crystal Apple Award in 1996. However, ten-finger typing training later succumbed to the internet era.

=== IPO and upswing (2000–2010) ===
Logo, which launched its first ERP solution in 1999 under the Unity brand, made its public offering in May 2000 and started trading on the stock exchange on May 8, 2000. In the same year, Logo Yazılım development center, known as Logo Yazılım Geliştirme Merkezi, opened in an 11,000 m2 indoor area in Gebze Organized Industrial Zone Technopark. Logo signed a technological cooperation agreement with IBM at the beginning of 2004.[9] The company, which made attempts to establish companies and open sales offices abroad in the 2000s, offered many products to its users in the 2000s.

=== Local and international dissemination (2010–present) ===
Logo introduced many new versions in the ERP segment in the 2010s. The first Java-based product, j-Platform was launched in 2012, and e-government products were also launched for the first time. Logo Yazılım made 12 acquisitions between 2011 and 2020, 8 in Turkey (Coretech, Netsis, WorldBI, Intermat, Sempa, Vardar, eLogo, and Peoplise) and 3 abroad (Total Soft, ABS, and Nexia).

Logo also established many new companies. In 2016, Logo Infosoft, a software company that will serve the Indian market with GST billing management software for small and medium-sized businesses, was established with GSF Software Labs LLC. The company is known as CaptainBiz.

In addition to Logo's strategy and investments in its core business areas, another initiative of Logo that includes investments for the future is Logo Ventures, one of Turkey's corporate venture funds.

== Technologies used ==
Logo prefers to use 3 basic languages in product development processes. The first one is Delphi, which is used for desktop (legacy) applications, and the others are C# and Java, which are used for both desktop and web applications. Vaadin, Angular, and React are used in web front-end development. The new generation Logo PaaS Platform is built on microservices based on Java and .Net Core.

The microservice communication protocol is built on REST API and the messaging infrastructure is built on Apache Kafka for event-based management. Again, the Logo ActivWorks project, which utilizes open source Activiti for workflow, was created, and Logo PaaS was put into service as the orchestration layer.

Prometheus and Elastic APM Technologies are used for service traceability, while the "Behavior Driven Development" (BDD) approach has been adopted for newly developed applications in testing processes. Thanks to BDD, automatic test scenarios are generated with "Cucumber" based on user acceptance test analysis. JMeter and Gatling are used for performance tests. Open source Katalon was also preferred for scenario tests. Although Angular + Ionic is preferred for mobile development, React Native has been used recently.

Logo Yazılım prefers Python as the main language in data science and machine learning projects and supports it with "Tensor Flow" and "Scikit-Learn" on the open-source side. On the cloud side, it uses Azure's cognitive services and AWS's SageMaker. PostgreSQL, MongoDB, ElasticSearch, HDFS, and Apache Airflow as ETL platform are used in the data lake infrastructure, which is designed to store and make sense of the data.

== R&D ==
Logo Yazılım uses approximately 30% of its total income for R&D activities. In 2021, 232 million TL was allocated to R&D expenses which accounted for 27% of total revenues. While the amount allocated for R&D and innovation increased by 59% compared to 2020, the number of employees working in these units increased by 16% compared to 2020 and reached 725. The company ranked 15th in the list of "250 largest companies by R&D expenditures - 2021" prepared by Turkishtime Magazine. In the information and IT sector, it ranked 2nd among the companies that spend the most on R&D.

In addition to its headquarters in Gebze, the company has R&D centers in Hacettepe Technocity in Ankara and Institute of Technology Campus in İzmir.
