= Chillwave =

Electronic pop genre from the late 2000s

- Other names: Glo-fi; hypnagogic pop; dream-beat
- Stylistic origins: Bedroom pop; dream pop; lo-fi; hauntology; psychedelia; electronic; indie pop; synth-pop; electropop; shoegaze; new wave; R&B; ambient; funk; indie rock; new-age; yacht rock; light rock; downtempo pop; post-noise
- Cultural origins: Late 2000s, United States
- Typical instruments: Vocals; synthesizer; sampler
- Derivative forms: Cloud rap; vaporwave

Other topics
- Chill-out music; Internet music

Chillwave is a music microgenre that emerged in the late 2000s. It is characterized by evoking the popular music of the late 1970s and early 1980s while engaging with notions of memory and nostalgia. Common features include a faded or dreamy retro pop sound, escapist lyrics (frequent topics include the beach or summer), psychedelic or lo-fi aesthetics, mellow vocals, slow-to-moderate tempos, effects processing (especially reverb), and vintage synthesizers.

Chillwave was one of the first music genres to develop primarily through the Internet. The term was coined in 2009 by the satirical blog Hipster Runoff to lampoon microgenres and indie acts whose sounds resembled incidental music from 1980s VHS tapes. Prior to this, the music would have been labelled as shoegaze, dream pop, ambient, or indietronica. Leading acts included Neon Indian, Washed Out, Nite Jewel and Toro y Moi, who gained attention during 2009's "Summer of Chillwave". Washed Out's 2009 track "Feel It All Around" remains the best-known chillwave song. By the end of 2009 the term was established enough for Pitchfork to include "chillwave/glo-fi" (exemplified by Washed Out, Neon Indian and Nite Jewel) among trends in its annual readers’ poll.

Many artists exploited the style's low-budget simplicity, which led to an oversaturation of acts that contributed to the original scene's demise. The phrase "chillwave" came to be used as a pejorative due to the music's perceived shallowness and reliance on nostalgia. Detractors also criticized the term for having been contrived by media publications. It heralded the early 2010s proliferation of Internet music microgenres, such as vaporwave, which originated as an ironic variant of chillwave. By the mid-2010s, chillwave had faded in popularity, with most of the original artists and listeners of the genre shifting focus to other music styles.

== Musical origins ==
[S]omething that could pass for today's "chillwave" has existed, in wide and steady circulation, at just about every moment for 20 years, and mostly as such a rote and staple sound that nobody would even think to name it specifically.

— Nitsuh Abebe, Pitchfork, July 2011

Chillwave has been classified as psychedelia, bedroom pop, or electropop. Before a specific term for the music was coined, it was described as shoegaze, dream pop, ambient, or indietronica. Pitchfork's Nitsuh Abebe writes that, since at least 1992, the style had existed for one principal reason: "stoned, happy college kids listening to records while they fall asleep". Abebe cited Slowdive, Darla Records' Bliss Out ambient compilations, and Casino Versus Japan's eponymous 1998 album as examples. One of the earliest known manifestations of the genre is the Beach Boys' song "All I Wanna Do" from their 1970 album Sunflower. Boards of Canada, whom Abebe says pre-chillwave music was often compared to, were also influential, as were Fennesz, and J Dilla's 2006 album Donuts.

Ariel Pink has been referred to as "the godfather" of chillwave, although early use of this term was ambivalent, and Pink himself rejects the idea. He initially gained recognition in the mid-2000s through a string of home-recorded albums that reconfigured 1970s radio-rock and 1980s new wave in a lo-fi setting. The Paw Tracks record label, which distributed Pink's albums, was run by Animal Collective, who signed Pink after being impressed by a CD of his home recordings, starting with The Doldrums (2000). Uncut's Sam Richard profiled Pink as "a lo-fi legend" whose "ghostly pop sound" proved influential to chillwave acts such as Ducktails and Toro y Moi. Critic Adam Harper disputed Pink's "godfather of chillwave" status, writing that his influence on lo-fi scenes has been somewhat overstated, explaining that his music lacks "the mirror-shades-cool synth groove of chillwave... Pink's albums are zany, personal, largely rock-based and dressed in awkward glam". Discussing chillwave's bedroom pop precursors, Allene Norton of Cellars opined that Pink is "definitely not chillwave but that kind of stuff influenced a lot of the artists making it, like Washed Out".

Panda Bear's "Take Pills" (2007)
The second track from Person Pitch. Music critic Anthony Carew wrote that the album's "signature sound of watery electronics, washed-out samples and Beach Boys-y vocals essentially inspired the chillwave sound".

In March 2007, Animal Collective member Panda Bear (Noah Lennox) released his third solo album Person Pitch, which is credited with launching the chillwave style. The album influenced a wide range of subsequent indie music, with its sound serving as the major inspiration for chillwave and a number of soundalikes. Animal Collective itself also contributed to the movement. Their eighth album Merriweather Post Pavilion, released in January 2009, was particularly influential for its ambient sounds and repetitive melodies, but was not as tightly associated with the "hazy" psychedelia that chillwave was identified with. According to Flavorwire's Tom Hawking, chillwave acts extrapolated "the sort of ill-defined pastoral nostalgia" from Animal Collective's early work "and spun it into an entire genre". However, "Animal Collective were never really part of that scene, such as it was — they were more like its spiritual overlords".

In February 2008, Atlas Sound (Bradford Cox of Deerhunter) released his debut solo album, Let the Blind Lead Those Who Can See but Cannot Feel. According to music journalist Larry Fitzmaurice, "it’s impossible to overstate Cox’s influence on [chillwave]" and he added that the album's "ice-sculpture ambient pop... was streaked with themes of impermanence and memory, which would soon come to define chillwave as a whole". Lennox later contributed guest vocals to Cox's 2009 song "Walkabout", referred to as an "early chillwave totem" by Fitzmaurice.

In November 2008, Los Angeles musician Ramona Gonzalez released Good Evening, the debut album for her Nite Jewel project, characterized by an abstract approach to groove, reference to 1980s dance-pop and contemporary R&B, and low fidelity production. Nite Jewel was included at the time by publications like Pitchfork and Creative Loafing as part of chillwave and have been retrospectively credited by music critics as having helped establish the stylistic template for the movement. Gonzalez later noted that she initially "despised" being categorized as part of the genre, viewing the tag as a media creation used to lump together unrelated artists, but eventually came to appreciate being compared to those acts and in 2020 stated that she felt her early work had "helped define the genre”, which led her to frustration regarding the erasure of female artists and particularly women of color from the historical narrative of the movement.

== Etymology and hypnagogic pop ==
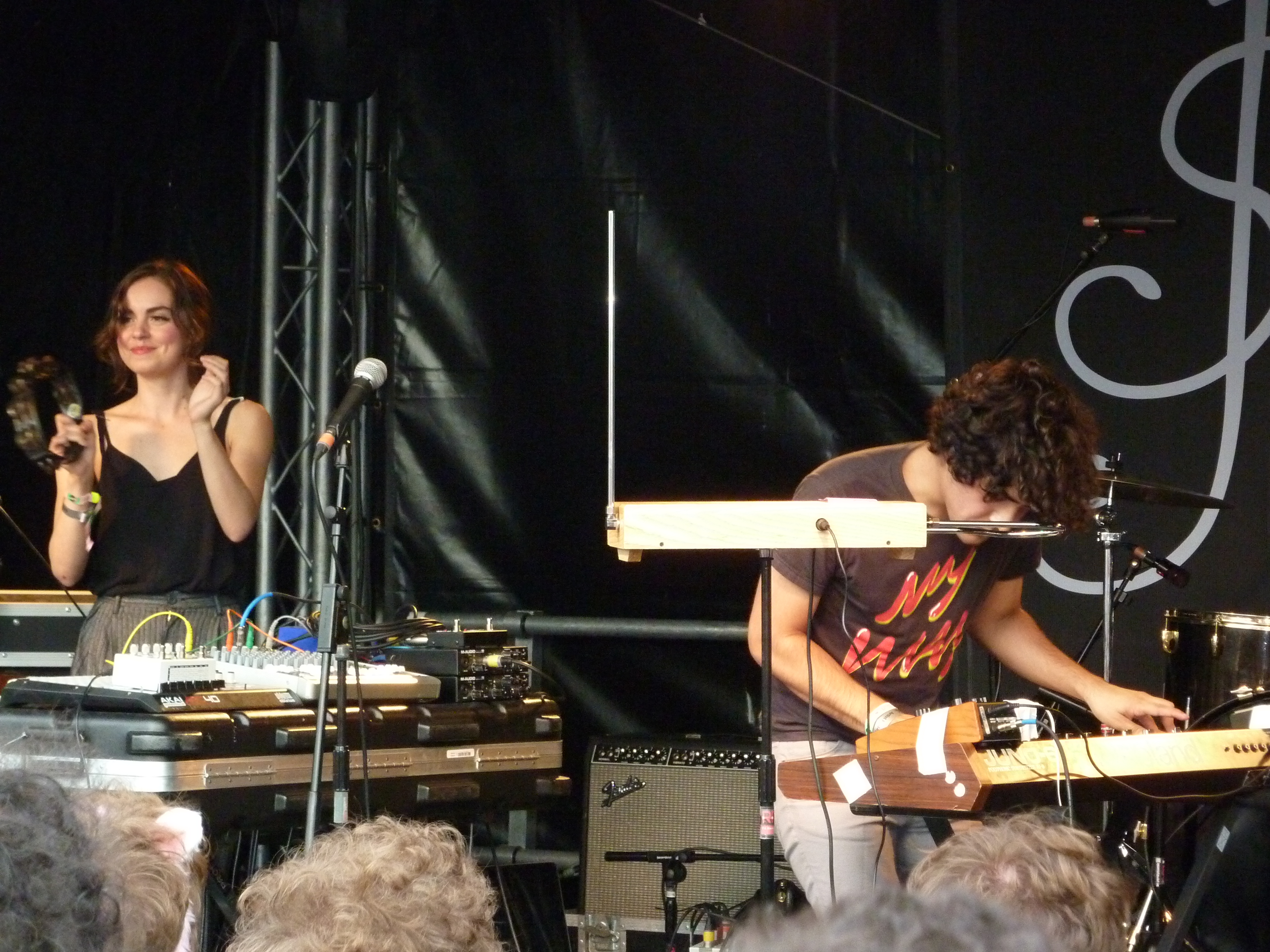
Neon Indian performing in 2010

Today, chill is everywhere—as an aesthetic descriptor, a vague lifestyle goal, an overall behavioral imperative. But back in the doldrums of the late ’00s, it was a novel proposition, not so much an aspiration as an escape. As America reeled from the collapse of entire sectors of the economy, young folks across the country burrowed into their bedrooms, fired up their laptops, and worked out their nostalgia with woozy new-wave synths, tape-warped samples, narcoleptic drum patterns, and hazy vocals hiding more than a smidgen of ennui beneath all that blissed-out reverb. [...] Though few artists actively identified as chillwavers, and the scene’s pioneers quickly moved on, the sound proved one of the past decade’s most influential and enduring aesthetics, paving the way for everything from Tame Impala to lofi study beats.

— Philip Sherburne of Pitchfork (October 7, 2021)

Most accounts attribute "chillwave" to a July 2009 post written by "Carles", the pseudonymous manager of the blog Hipster Runoff. The site, which was active between 2007 and 2013, was known for its ironic posts on "alt" trends. Carles used the term to describe a host of emerging bands that appeared similar to each other. A July 27 post titled "Is WASHED OUT the next Neon Indian/Memory Cassette?" ruminated on a nascent trend involving the "musicsphere" searching for a "new 'authentic, undergroundish product' that isn't a huge brand like AnCo/GrizzBear/etc.... It seems easiest to have a chill project, that is somewhat 'conceptual' but also demonstrates that ur band has 'pop sensibilities' or something". He proposed a list of genre names, including "Chill Bro Core", "Pitchforkwavegaze", "forkshit", and "CumWave". The post concludes:

Feel like I might call it 'chill wave' music in the future. Feels like 'chill wave' is dominated by 'thick/chill synths' while conceptual core is still trying to 'use real instruments/sound like it was recorded in nature'. Feel like chillwave is supposed to sound like something that was playing in the background of 'an old VHS cassette that u found in ur attic from the late 80s/early 90s'.

A few weeks later, in August, The Wire journalist David Keenan coined "hypnagogic pop" to describe a trend of 2000s lo-fi and post-noise in which indie acts began to engage with elements of cultural nostalgia, childhood memory, and outdated recording technology. Chillwave initially became subsumed under the "hypnagogic pop" and "glo-fi" labels, although "glo-fi" quickly fell out of popular usage.

While chillwave and hypnagogic pop both evoke the cultural aesthetics of the 1980s and 1990s, chillwave espoused a more commercial sound that emphasized "cheesy" hooks and reverb effects. According to Pitchfork's Miles Bowe, chillwave came to constitute a pejorative referencing the "cynical" rebranding of hypnagogic pop acts who had "streamlined [their] style to find genuine pop success". Keenan, who had previously championed hypnagogic pop, became disenchanted with many such artists, writing in 2011 that "in the reductive glare of mainstream media", chillwave had become "shorthand for a cheap form of revivalism and a valorising of bad taste".

Carles later explained that he had set out to throw "a bunch of pretty silly names on a blog post and [see] which one stuck". Neon Indian's Alan Palomo surmised that the tag caught on "because it was the most dismissive and sarcastic ... the term chillwave came when the era of blog-mediated music was at its height at that time". The term did not gain mainstream currency until early 2010, when it was the subject of articles by The Wall Street Journal and The New York Times.

== Peak popularity ==
=== Summer of Chillwave and early vanguard ===
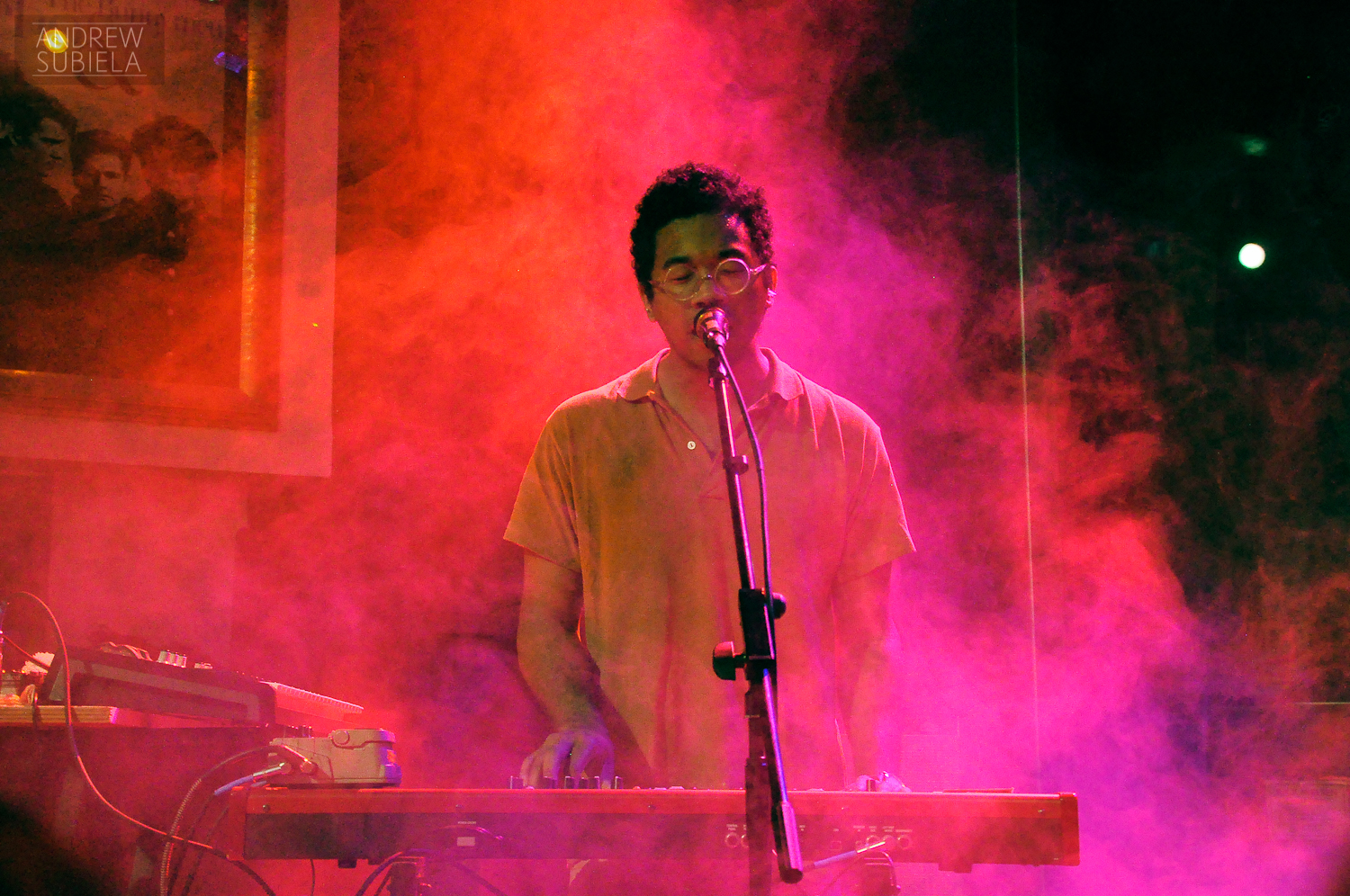
Chaz Bundick (Toro y Moi, pictured in 2012)

Chillwave flourished throughout 2008 and 2009, culminating with the 2009 "Summer of Chillwave", which was marked by an inundation of artists with names and song titles referencing summertime, the beach, or surfing. Songs were generally of low-to-moderate tempo and incorporated vintage, analog instrumentation that evoked the popular music of the late 1970s and early 1980s. Although it had no specific geographical source point, chillwave was concentrated in the southern and eastern coasts of the U.S., with Brooklyn, New York figuring the most prominently. Neon Indian (Alan Palomo), Washed Out (Ernest Greene), and Toro y Moi (Chaz Bundick) were considered to be the vanguard of the chillwave movement. All three were one-man acts from the Southern U.S., while Greene and Bundick were acquaintances and collaborators.

Washed Out's "Feel It All Around" (2009)
"Feel It All Around" set the template for chillwave.

Greene's "Feel It All Around" (July 2009) became the best known song of the genre, later to be employed as a backdrop for the opening sequence of the television series Portlandia (2011–2018). Created mostly from a slowed-down sample of Gary Low's 1983 song "I Want You", RBMA's Sian Rowe wrote that it "has all the things that chillwave would be defined by: lo-fi synths, laid-back filtered-out vocals and disposable camera-style photography that usually involves the beach or anything watery".

Neon Indian's debut Psychic Chasms (October 2009) was another early album that typified the genre, particularly the tracks "Deadbeat Summer", "Terminally Chill", and "Should've Taken Acid With You". Bundick's debut Causers of This (January 2010) drew similar attention for its style of old-fashioned, lo-fi pop. The album was acclaimed by critics and given an early endorsement by Kanye West, which lent the work significantly more popularity. Rolling Stone additionally dubbed Bundick the "godfather of chillwave".

Writing in 2019, Ian Cohen of Stereogum argued Dayve Hawke (variously known as Memory Tapes, Memory Cassette, and Weird Tapes) to be the fourth leading chillwave act of the era. Cohen identified Hawke's output as "quintessential chillwave documents", namely his debut album Seek Magic (August 2009), "probably the best album of the bunch that dropped in 2009 — and, by definition, probably the greatest chillwave album of all time".

=== Vaporwave ===
Vaporwave is a microgenre of electronic music that originated as an ironic variant of chillwave. It was loosely derived from the work of hypnagogic artists such as Ariel Pink and James Ferraro, and was characterized by the invocation of retro popular culture as well as the "analog nostalgia" of the chillwave scene. Amplifying the experimental tendencies of hypnagogic pop, vaporwave is cleanly produced and composed almost entirely from samples. It relied on sources such as smooth jazz, retro elevator music, R&B, and dance music from the 1980s and 1990s, along with the application of slowed-down chopped and screwed techniques, looping, and other effects.

Writers, fans, and artists struggled to differentiate vaporwave, chillwave, and hypnagogic pop from each other. One of the descriptions of the genre that were levied by online forums was "chillwave for Marxists". Vaporwave found wider appeal over the middle of 2012, building an audience on sites like Last.fm, Reddit, and 4chan. A wealth of its own subgenres and offshoots—some of which deliberately gesture at the genre's non-seriousness—soon followed.

== Decline ==
Chillwave reached its peak in mid-2010, the same year it was received with widespread criticism. Some of the common descriptors used for the music in reviews or blog posts became clichés, including "soundscapes", "dreamy", "lush", "glowing", and "sun-kissed". The Village Voice's Christopher Weingarten remarked in December 2009 that "90 percent of writing about glo-fi mentions 'the summer' in some fashion. And summer's been over for, like, four months now".

The chillwave scene ultimately "withered and died". One major reason was a sudden oversaturation of artists, which came as a consequence of its simple production process. Writing in the New Times Broward-Palm Beach, Reed Fischer referred to Pitchfork's negative review of Millionyoung's "perfectly fine album" Replicants (February 2011) as a declaration of the genre's demise. Explaining why the genre fell out of public favor, Bundick surmised that chillwave "did its thing, and once it became a thing, people stopped caring about it, even the artists [making it]".

In 2015, Fitzmaurice reflected that the "holy triumvirate" of Washed Out, Toro y Moi, and Neon Indian had maintained their careers in spite of the genre's decline. Tom Hawking predicted that the "chillwave era will most likely be a footnote to musical history, a faint flaring of middle-class angst in a frightening time for everyone. But that doesn't mean it's not worth examining regardless, because its simple existence says far more about a generation than the music itself ever did".

== Legacy and critical perspective ==
=== 2008 financial crisis, summertime, and escapism ===
Both sonically and in backwards-gazing ethos, the genre emerged from a sense of generational retreat—a collective desire to return to the womb, maybe, or at least to find a place of contentment where we're left alone to exist in a sort of vaguely pleasant stasis.

— Larry Fitzmaurice, Vice, 2015

Referencing the genre's Brooklyn-centric origins, Hawking noted that the "fact this was such beach-centric music makes it interesting... chillwave also strikes me as hugely middle class music. ... whereas punk reacted with anger and a desire for change, chillwave was the sound of escapism and resignation. ... it's surely no coincidence that chillwave's rise coincided with the aftermath of the 2007 sub-prime economic meltdown".

Eric Grandy of The Stranger said that the genre's practitioners shared "a kind of fond nostalgia for some vague, idealized childhood. Its posture is a sonic shoulder shrug, a languorous, musical 'whatevs'". Another attempt at identifying the common threads of the scene was offered by Jon Pareles in The New York Times: "They're solo acts or minimal bands, often with a laptop at their core, and they trade on memories of electropop from the 1980s, with bouncing, blipping dance-music hooks (and often weaker lead voices). It's recession-era music: low-budget and danceable". Vulture's Frank Guan writes that the evocation of summer is not "as a season of deprivation and loss of control, but [as] a summer spent in suburban quiet and prosperity, chilling indoors alone with central A/C, watching daytime TV or listening to music". One unnamed Pitchfork writer opined: "This music isn't easy to write about. It takes a lot of work to get past 'soundtrack to the summer' and 'makes me want to hit the beach'. So much of this summer-obsessed lo-fi is about atmosphere and feel that it can seem weird to scrutinize it".

In November 2009, Pitchfork ran an editorial feature on the "summer of chillwave". The Beach Boys' Brian Wilson, who had been compared to Animal Collective, was mentioned as a "looming figure" throughout that summer's indie music. An unnamed editor argued that the similarities were more abstract than musical and that Wilson's influence stems from his legend as an "emotionally fragile dude with mental health problems who coped by taking drugs". The editor continued, "Summertime now is about disorientation: 'Should Have Taken Acid With You'; 'The Sun Was High (And So Am I)'; You take the fantasy of [Wilson's] music-- the cars, the sand, the surf-- add a dollop of melancholy and a smudge of druggy haze, and you have some good music for being alone in a room with only a computer to keep you company".

=== Internet music genres and validity ===
Chillwave was one of the first genres to acquire an identity online and one of the last phenomena of indie music to predate Twitter's dominance of social media. According to writer Garin Pirnia, it is an example of linking musical trends by Internet outlets rather than geographic location. Pirnia wrote in 2010 (quoting Palomo), "Whereas musical movements were once determined by a city or venue where the bands congregated, 'now it's just a blogger or some journalist that can find three or four random bands around the country and tie together a few commonalities between them and call it a genre'". In the description of The Guardian's Emilie Friedlander, chillwave was "the internet electronic micro-genre that launched a hundred internet electronic micro-genres (think: vaporwave, witch house, seapunk, shitgaze, distroid, hardvapor), not to mention its corollaries in [2010s] internet rap, which largely shared its collagist, hyper-referential approach to sound".

Chillwave and other offshoots of it such as vaporwave gained popularity on YouTube, often as songs that were ironic or made to be memes.

[Chillwave] was a parody of a scene, both a defining moment for the music blogosphere and the last gasp. Sites like Gorilla vs. Bear and Pitchfork bought into it for a while, and sincere think pieces in traditional media publications like The Wall Street Journal asked, "Is Chillwave the Next Big Music Trend?" It never could have been a proper trend, because it was transparently manufactured.

— Dave Schilling, Grantland, 2015

Grantland's Dave Schilling argued that the term was created to reveal "how arbitrary and meaningless" existing labels such as "shoegaze" and "dream pop" were. George McIntire of the San Francisco Bay Guardian described chillwave's origin as in the "throes of the blogosphere" and called the term a "cheap, slap-on label used to describe grainy, dancey, lo-fi, 1980s inspired music" and a "disservice to any band associated with it". In 2011, Carles said it was "ridiculous that any sort of press took it seriously" and that although the bands he spoke to "get annoyed" by the tag, "they understand that it's been a good thing. What about iTunes making it an official genre? It's now theoretically a marketable indie sound".

By 2015, the majority consensus was that chillwave was a fabricated non-genre. In 2016, Palomo described labels like "chillwave" and "vaporwave" as "arbitrary" and that he "couldn't have been more happy" about the "chillwave" descriptor falling out of favor. Toro y Moi's Chaz Bundick publicly expressed the following about the genre, saying, "I like the fact that I'm associated with it. It's cool. Not a lot of artists get a chance to be a part of some sort of movement, so I guess in a way I'm super flattered to be considered a part of that".

== Related terms ==
=== Glo-fi ===
Glo-fi is a term for a musical style that was initially used synonymously with hypnagogic pop and chillwave. The style has been described as a derivative of post-noise. In 2010, The Guardian published an article by music critic Simon Reynolds where he stated "post-noise microscenes like glo-fi" were maintaining "the tape trade tradition, releasing music in small-run editions as low as 30 copies and wrapping them in surreal photocopy-collage artwork". That same year, The Quietus equated "glo-fi" with chillwave and hypnagogic pop. While The New York Times equated the term to chillwave.
