= Logos (Catholic journal) =

- Discipline: Religious studies
- Language: English
- Edited by: Dr. Raymond N. MacKenzie

Publication details
- History: 1997–present
- Publisher: University of St. Thomas (Minnesota), Center for Catholic Studies (United States)
- Frequency: Quarterly

Standard abbreviations
- ISO 4: Logos

Indexing
- ISSN: 1091-6687 (print); 1533-791X (web)
- LCCN: sn96003765
- OCLC no.: 525603905

Links
- Journal homepage; Project MUSE

Logos: A Journal of Catholic Thought and Culture is a quarterly academic journal of interdisciplinary studies from a Catholic perspective. The journal was established in 1997 and is published by the University of St. Thomas Center for Catholic Studies. The editor-in-chief is Raymond N. MacKenzie.

== Abstracting and indexing ==
The journal is abstracted and indexed in:

- Academic Search Premier
- Catholic Periodical and Literature Index
- Humanities International Index
- Religious and Theological Abstracts
