= Tomory Dodge =

American artist

- Education: California Institute of the Arts, Valencia
- Known for: Painting

Tomory Dodge is an American artist. He graduated from the California Institute of the Arts in Valencia, California, in 2004. Before that, he had a solo show at the Taxter & Spengemann gallery in New York. He paints landscapes with a Surrealist influence, the paint applied broadly with a brush or palette-knife.
