= Logos (Atlas Sound album) =

Studio album by Atlas Sound
- Released: October 19, 2009
- Recorded: December 2007–June 2009
- Genres: Bedroom pop; experimental; dream pop; indie pop
- Length: 43:47
- Label: Kranky
- Producer: Bradford Cox

Atlas Sound chronology
Let the Blind Lead Those Who Can See but Cannot Feel (2008)	Logos (2009)	Parallax (2011)

Logos is the second studio album from ambient experimental project Atlas Sound. It was released on October 19, 2009, in Europe by 4AD, and on October 20 in the US by Kranky. The album features guest contributions from Noah Lennox of Animal Collective and Lætitia Sadier of Stereolab. Units ordered directly from Rough Trade came packaged with a bonus six-song EP of leftover material.

The album reached #7 on the Billboard Heatseekers album chart. The cover art features an image of Cox, who has Marfan syndrome, and is inspired by the artwork of his previous 2008 release, Let the Blind Lead Those Who Can See but Cannot Feel, of which the cover features a painting where a young boy's face is obscured by a camera flash.

== Background ==
An unmastered and unfinished version of Logos was accidentally leaked in 2008 by Cox via his own MediaFire account. The incident caused an outrage from Cox, who posted on his blog that he felt what was leaked was simply a "sketch" of what he intended to be the final product, and was not meant to be released publicly. He almost abandoned the project, but continued to work on the album shortly after the incident. A leak of the finalized version of the album again surfaced on September 1, 2009. Cox later spoke of the situation, commenting, "I did not react well to the leak, in retrospect. It became the kind of internet-fueled drama that I was quickly learning to despise".

The album's first single "Walkabout" was made available for streaming and download on 4AD's website. A music video was also produced for the song "Quick Canal." The video was directed by Flitz Vladich, and premiered on 4AD's website on October 19, 2009.

== Reception ==
Professional ratings
Aggregate scores
Source	Rating
AnyDecentMusic?	7.6/10
Metacritic	81/100
Review scores
Source	Rating
AllMusic	4/5 stars
The A.V. Club	B
The Guardian	4/5 stars
Mojo	4/5 stars
NME	8/10
Pitchfork	8.2/10
Q	4/5 stars
Rolling Stone	3.5/5 stars
The Times	4/5 stars
Uncut	3/5 stars

Logos received positive reviews from music critics. At Metacritic, which assigns a normalized rating out of 100 to reviews from mainstream critics, the album received an average score of 81, based on 26 reviews, indicating "universal acclaim".

== Track listing ==
1. "The Light That Failed" – 4:47
2. "An Orchid" – 3:05
3. "Walkabout" (featuring Noah Lennox) – 3:58
4. "Criminals" – 2:55
5. "Attic Lights" – 3:44 (featuring Sasha Vine)
6. "Shelia" – 3:32
7. "Quick Canal" (featuring Lætitia Sadier) – 8:38
8. "My Halo" – 3:16
9. "Kid Klimax" – 2:59
10. "Washington School" – 3:25
11. "Logos" – 3:28
12. "Difference BT" - 5:12 (Japan Bonus Track)
13. "St. Echo" - 3:16 (Japan Bonus Track)
14. "Eros" - 4:30 (Japan Bonus Track)
15. "Thanatos" - 1:26 (Japan Bonus Track)

=== Rough Trade EP ===
1. "Ruben" (Traditional) – 3:23
2. "Criminals" (Electronic) – 3:03
3. "Kid Klimax" (Acoustic) – 4:33
4. "Reminder" – 4:37
5. "I Know I Will Escape" – 4:24
6. "Nightwork" – 4:03
