= Let the Blind Lead Those Who Can See but Cannot Feel =

Studio album by Atlas Sound
- Released: February 18, 2008
- Recorded: 2007
- Genre: Experimental rock
- Length: 50:01
- Labels: Kranky, 4AD
- Producer: Bradford Cox

Atlas Sound chronology
Let the Blind Lead Those Who Can See but Cannot Feel (2008)	Logos (2009)

Alternative cover
- European edition artwork

Let the Blind Lead Those Who Can See but Cannot Feel is the debut studio album by Atlas Sound, the solo project of Deerhunter frontman Bradford Cox. The album was released in North America by Kranky on February 18, 2008 and in Europe by 4AD on May 5, 2008.

Described as "stream-of-consciousness" by Cox, each song was created extemporaneously over the span of several hours.

The lyrics of Let the Blind Lead are autobiographical, reflecting abuses he received as a child, past drug addictions, and his hospitalization as a teenager due to Marfan syndrome. Several songs concern his best friend Lockett Pundt, the guitarist for Deerhunter, to whom the album is dedicated. "Winter Vacation" is a reflection on the first time the two met, while in "Ativan", Cox examines his relationship with Pundt.

== Production ==
The music of Atlas Sound utilizes computer-based MIDI instruments, created and recorded in musical software Ableton Live; the program allows Cox "to turn pretty much any sound into a MIDI-controllable keyboard", according to him. Effects that were not already built into the program were seldom used. Brian Foote of the band Nudge assisted Cox in the production of Let the Blind Lead, by showing him the basics of the software, and aiding in the selection of equipment that would be used on the record. Cox described the process of recording the album as being stream-of-consciousness: "with Atlas Sound, the songs are being written as they're recorded". In addition, all of the lyrics on the album were created as they were being recorded on the first take.

The album's title is derived from a dream Cox had in which he saw a group of protesters, one of whom was holding up a sign reading "Let the blind lead those who can see but cannot feel". Upon waking, Cox wrote down the phrase on a notebook beside his bed. He described the concept to Out magazine as being "like you are able to see, but you might not know the right direction to go in. But somebody who can’t see might—just by instinct—lead you that way". The arrangement of the tracks on Let the Blind Lead is chronological, presented in the order in which they were recorded.

=== Artwork ===
The North American album cover artwork originates from a medical journal Cox discovered in a thrift store. A painting in the journal depicts a doctor treating an ill boy, "while his mom looks on, concerned", as described by Cox. In photographing the painting, the face of the boy was obscured by the flash of the camera. While it "kind of took away from the photo" according to him, the picture became "somehow…romantic, the idea that there was so much emotion in the face that it got whited out". Cox described the boy as being "the saddest boy…lovesick and emaciated", adding, "I related to that boy so much that I literally, in the thrift store, almost started crying". The European album artwork was created by v23, a group that designs cover art for label 4AD.

== Style ==
=== Music ===
"Quarantined"
The lyrics of this track reflect the life situation of children born with AIDS, and Cox, who was born with the genetic disorder Marfan Syndrome. Cox wanted the song to reflect his impression of children's hospitals which, after spending several months inside, he found to be "kind of haunted, weird places. That's what I wanted that song to encompass."

"Let the Blind Lead Those Who Can See but Cannot Feel"
The last song of Let the Blind Lead, like its opening, is an instrumental ambient piece. With this song, the album is brought full circle, starting and ending on an "ambient note", according to Cox.

Let the Blind Lead has been characterized as ambient, psychedelic, and pop music, similar in style to Cox's previous work with Deerhunter, such as the band's 2007 album Cryptograms. Cox is drawn to ambient music due to its ambiguous, repetitive, and "emotive" nature. He considers himself inspired in part by the style and "sonic picture" of girl groups and doo-wop music. Instruments heard on the record include the guitar, drums, glockenspiel, mbira, and Ghanaian bells. Cox also considers his voice an instrument of its own. While moving toward using less layering effects on the vocal tracks in his music, because he does not consider himself a songwriter, Cox prefers to use such effects to make his voice more instrumental and ambiguous in nature. He has said he is "always more interested in the parts that are like vocalists, wordless vocals: the harmonizing, the oohs when the vocals become like an instrument".

To create tracks on Let the Blind Lead, Cox continually adds elements to a song until he "feel[s] like it's getting crowded…When it sounds done, it's done. And if it seems like it's missing something, I'll go back and add something". Most of his music is the product of several hours' work, rather than that of a few days. In an interview with Pitchfork, Cox said that, with each song, "The genesis is usually a beat". Cox considers the music of Let the Blind Lead to have a "dynamic arc": the first half of the record contains "more accessible songs. I was very depressed in the middle, and it created this kind of black hole of misery. Then I tried to bring it up again at the end". Cox intended for his music to be "therapeutic", for both himself and his audience. In addition, he wanted the album to have a healing element, and be something "somebody could listen to all the way through and feel like they went through a bad period of time and came out of it". Pauline Oliveros, a composer who runs an organization that studies music therapy, was described by Cox as having "a big influence" on him and his ideas of therapeutic music. He considers music "the only art form I know of that has such an immediate effect on the human psyche", and found the time he first met and talked with Oliveros as being "like meeting a hero of mine".

The album's opening track, "A Ghost Story", contains a sample of a young boy telling a ghost story, obtained by Cox from an internet audio archive of free music samples. Cox found the sample "moving", and used it to create an intro that would set the tone for the rest of the album. Said Cox, "I wanted to create a haunted record, you know? Kind of filled with ghosts. I thought it just set up the album nicely". He summarized the song as consisting of "basically just a cassette and effected hammered dulcimers". The sounds of "Small Horror" were intended to represent "banging depression". Cox described the song as being "the most depressing song" on Let the Blind Lead, and as being "concrete" musically. Instrumental track "Ready Set Glow" is supposed to "create the impression of passing out and falling back into a bed of strobe lights". Another instrumental song, "After Class", is a "sonic rearrangement" of a track produced by Deerhunter for the 2008 compilation album Living Bridge. The self-titled final song of Let the Blind Lead, another instrumental track, was intended to bring the album full circle, having it start and end on an "ambient note". Lockett Pundt, a recurring focus of the album's lyrics, created a guitar loop which was the basis for the song "Cold as Ice".

=== Lyrics ===
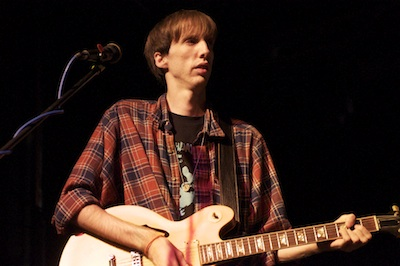
Bradford Cox (pictured) described the lyrical origins of each song on Let the Blind Lead as largely autobiographical in nature, reflecting his life experiences

While Cox was working with Deerhunter to produce their 2007 album Cryptograms, it was considered Kranky policy to not print the lyrics of an album in its liner notes. This was a rule enforced by label owner Joel Leoschke, who believed the practice "demystifi[ed] the experience of a rock record". Despite largely agreeing with this sentiment, Cox chose to print the lyrics of Let the Blind Lead, in part because he wanted to "see what they looked like", having ad-libbed the words of every song on their first take. In an interview with Pitchfork, Cox described the lyrical origins of each song on Let the Blind Lead; they are largely autobiographical in nature, reflecting life experiences of his. The song "Recent Bedroom" conveys an experience Cox had when his aunt died: "She was in her bedroom, and everybody knew she was about to pass away, and she went out, she faded out, and everybody just started crying". Although he was "overwhelmed" by her death, it did not bring him to tears like the rest of his family. This event is expressed in the song by the lines "I walked outside, I could not cry / I don’t know, I don’t know why". Cox’s inability to cry stemmed from his having been "very involved in drugs" at the time, which he believes eliminated his "childhood instinct…to cry". The song attempts to communicate an emotional vacancy and sense of detachment characterized by "moving from childhood to adolescence".

"River Card" is based on a Puerto Rican short story entitled "There’s a Little Coloured Boy at the Bottom of the River". The story tells of a boy who falls in love with his reflection in a river, believing it is another person, similar to the Greek myth of Narcissus. Cox attempted to capture "this childhood homoerotic energy… I remember experiencing and relating to". In the conclusion of the story, the boy jumps into the water and drowns, thus making "River Card" "a song about a dead child". The lyrical contents of "Quarantined" were inspired by a Russian article Cox read about children born with AIDS, confined in hospitals due to the "various lifestyles and mistakes" of their parents. Cox, who has a genetic condition known as Marfan syndrome, related the article to his own experiences with children's hospitals. Having had many chest and back surgeries when he was sixteen, he "got real used to children's hospitals", finding them "kind of haunted, weird places". "On Guard" is described as "a sad song", the lyrics of which illustrate having to age and dealing with the "newfound anxiety" that comes with meeting new people. Cox explains that this anxiety stems from lacking "the energy to represent yourself to people. You’re always on guard".

The lyrical content of "Cold as Ice" is based on a relationship Cox had with a girl named Alice. Having fallen in love with her in the fifth grade, he proposed to marry her on the school's playground. Alice rejected Cox, calling the ring he had given her "a cheap piece of crap". Years later, Cox worked with Alice at a Subway restaurant. Occasionally, "for no reason", she would ask him to watch her change into her uniform in the restaurant's refrigerator, which he described as having been as "cold as ice". Cox suspects that "she was trying to torture me or something". The song "Bite Marks" is about "sadomasochism and boy prostitution." In the song, Cox references an experience he had when he was kissing a man who bit him "really, really hard" on his shoulder, leaving bite marks "for like two weeks". This experience, along with other abuses he received as a child, formed the lyrical basis of the song.

A recurring source of lyrical subject matter in Let the Blind Lead is Cox's best friend, Deerhunter guitarist Lockett Pundt, whom the album is dedicated to. "Winter Vacation" concerns the first time the two met. Seeing him at a bus stop while vacationing in Savannah, Georgia, Cox was "attracted to him, but not in some kind of like, just physical way". Seeing "his melancholy, his sitting alone, staring at the ground", he "fell in love" with him. Cox and his family later drove to a beach; "Winter Vacation" relates to Cox’s memory of the beach, being "infected with that new love" found after meeting Pundt. The words of "Scraping Past" are about "moving on… And wondering if somebody is going to come with you or…stay behind". This uncertainty is characterized by several lines Cox considers "pop song clichés", referencing "rain that comes and goes". In the song, Cox asks Pundt, "Are you going to come with me, or are you staying here?" In "Ativan" Cox examines his addiction to the drug of the same name, as well as his relationship with Pundt. "It talks a lot about how things have changed between me and Lockett's relationship and how he's met a girl and… our friendship is never gonna change, but it's difficult sometimes". Cox asserts that he would "rather just take whatever drugs it takes to go to sleep and sleep through it… I'm not prepared to face it yet".

== Reception ==
Professional ratings
Aggregate scores
Source	Rating
Metacritic	81/100
Review scores
Source	Rating
AllMusic	3.5/5 stars
Blender	3.5/5 stars
Drowned in Sound	8/10
Mojo	4/5 stars
Paste	4/5 stars
Pitchfork	8.6/10
PopMatters	8/10
Slant	2.5/5 stars
Tiny Mix Tapes	4/5 stars
URB	4.5/5 stars

Let the Blind Lead was generally well-received by critics; some praised Cox's emotional lyrics, while others criticized his music for lacking substance. The record charted at number 32 on Billboard magazine's Top Heatseekers chart for one week.

On Metacritic, Let the Blind Lead Those Who Can See but Cannot Feel has received an average critic score of 81 out of 100, based on 23 reviews, indicating "Universal Acclaim". Upon release, the album received Pitchfork's "Best New Music" accolade, and was later placed 26th on the publication's 50 Best Albums of 2008.

Marc Hogan of Pitchfork praised the album in his review, writing that it "works best as a swirling, disorienting whole", and "those drawn to his lovesick, evolving audio presence have… an entire world to explore". Dominic Umile of PopMatters found the album's "lovesickness and confessions" to be "as tenderly delivered as its hazy atmospherics are", and, in their "bare authenticity… far more compelling in repeat indulgences than Deerhunter’s explorations". Tiny Mix Tapes awarded the album 4 out of 5 stars, saying that, while each song has a "distinctive quality" allowing it to stand on its own, by backing out to view the album as a whole, the "individual elements unify…mak[ing] a greater holistic product".

Wilson McBee of Slant was more negative towards the album, writing that "Let the Blind Lead presents an intriguing mixture of sounds, but rarely does Cox whip them into anything very exciting". In his review, he likened the album to a "tempered" version of Deerhunter's Cryptograms. Under the Radar wrote that many of the tracks of Let the Blind Lead "never materialize into anything more substantial than vapor". Sean O'Neal of The Onion's The A.V. Club said that, considering the number of free songs Cox has released on his blog, a full-length album "seems almost beside the point". He wrote that the record's songs suggest the work of "a bedroom-pop auteur who doesn't know when to quit tweaking". AllMusic writer Marisa Brown found that, with Let the Blind Lead, "as with Deerhunter, Cox has the tendency to try too hard to be profound (take the title -- or the title track -- for example), wanting so badly to say something important that he sounds trite and forced, and untrustworthy". Jonathen Cohen wrote in his review for Magnet that "Cox’s narratives make little sense", noting "much of the time, he’s not even singing so much as wailing wordlessly".

In an interview with John Norris of MTV News, Cox said of the reception to Let the Blind Lead: "The response to this Atlas Sound record… the general response was very, very positive, but very, very much rooted in the concept that this is an emotional album. This is an album that has a lot of feeling behind it, and it's very naked…That might in fact be [the case], but the reason it is that way is because it was done stream-of-consciously. [sic] […] I'm not calculated. I don't mind sentimentality, as long as it's not calculated".

== Track listing ==
All songs were written by Bradford Cox.

1. "A Ghost Story" – 2:44
2. "Recent Bedroom" – 3:46
3. "River Card" – 3:20
4. "Quarantined" – 4:20
5. "On Guard" – 3:40
6. "Winter Vacation" – 4:00
7. "Cold as Ice" – 3:33
8. "Scraping Past" – 4:30
9. "Small Horror" – 2:54
10. "Ready, Set, Glow" – 2:58
11. "Bite Marks" – 4:18
12. "After Class" – 3:29
13. "Ativan" – 2:51
14. "Let the Blind Lead Those Who Can See but Cannot Feel" – 3:45

=== Bonus disc ===
Included with the European release by 4AD. This collection of tracks was also released digitally by Kranky as Another Bedroom EP.

1. "Another Bedroom" – 5:41
2. "It Rained" – 3:05
3. "Stained Glass Swan" – 2:58
4. "The Abandoned Closet" – 2:16
5. "Spring Break" – 4:57
6. "ABC Glasgow" – 5:02

== Personnel ==
=== Technical personnel ===
- Bradford Cox – engineering, mixing
- Brian Foote – mixing
- Craig S. McCaffrey – layout assistance
- Bob Weston – mastering

== Release history ==
Region	Date	Label	Format	Catalog
North America	February 18, 2008	Kranky	compact disc	KRANK 114
North America	February 18, 2008	Kranky	double LP	KRANK 114
Europe	May 5, 2008	4AD	double CD	CADD 2811CD
Europe	May 5, 2008	4AD	digital download	EAD 2811A
