= FYF Fest =

Former music festival in Los Angeles, CA

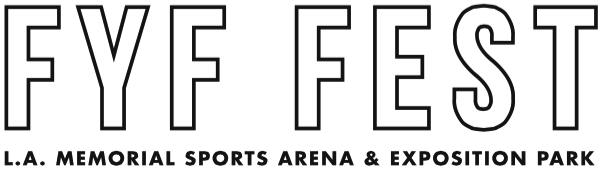
- FYF in 2015
- Genre: Rock, pop, indie, hip hop, EDM
- Locations: Los Angeles Exposition Park; 3939 S Figueroa St; Los Angeles, California 90089
- Years active: 2004–2017
- Founders: Sean Carlson
- Website: fyffest.com

FYF Fest (short for "Fuck Yeah Fest Fest") was an annual three-day music festival held at the Los Angeles Exposition Park in Los Angeles, California. It was founded by Sean Carlson in 2004 and later solely produced by Goldenvoice, a subsidiary of AEG Live. The event showcased many genres of music, including rock, pop, indie, electronic and hip hop as well as art installations and sculptures. The festival also had its own night market where people could buy food while watching the concerts. Throughout the whole park, four stages hosted live music. There was the Main Stage, the Lawn, the Arena, and the newest installment of the Woods.

Although FYF's popularity was not as big as Coachella or EDC, the festival showcased popular and established music artists. Notable artists included: Janet Jackson, Yeah Yeah Yeahs, MGMT, Interpol, Phoenix, Kanye West, Morrissey, Flume, The Strokes, Kendrick Lamar, Grace Jones, Frank Ocean, LCD Soundsystem, and D'Angelo.

== Lineups ==
=== 2004 ===
July 2, 2004

@ The Echo The EchoPlex (before it was the EchoPlex and was a banquet hall), Sea Level Records, the alley way behind Sea Level Records and Casa De Pablo
Wires on Fire • The Mean Reds • Toys That Kill • Poulain • Michael Runion Will Never Die • Horse The Band • Subtitle • Sabertooth Tiger • The Mae Shi • Big Muscles • Snake Vs. Lizard • Jesus Christ Makes A Shotgun Sound • Werewolf With Robot Hands • Shark Pants

=== 2005 ===
July 2, 2005

@ The Echo, Jensen Rec Center, Sea Level Records, and the space above the American Apparel on Sunset just west of Alvarado that was someones loft turned venue for one night
Dillinger Four • The Mean Reds • Giant Drag • Limbeck • Beehive and the Barracudas • Wires on Fire • Darker My Love • Curl Up and Die • Wives (No Age) • Rolling Blackouts • Greg Ashley of Gris Gris • The Oohlas • The Mojo Filters • Toys That Kill • Upsilon Acrux • Travis Shettel of Piebald • The Red Onions • Division Day • The Hips • The Pope • Bobby Dazzler Comedy: Morgan Murphy • Sarah Silverman • Jonah Ray • Matt Dwyer

=== 2006 ===
August 18, 19TH, 20TH 2006

@ Echo, Sea Level Records & Jenson Rec Center

August 18: Circle Jerks • The Bronx • 400 Blows • The Black Lips • Burning Brides • Future Pigeon • Horse the Band • Nudity • Gayrilla Biscuits • Blood Meridan • The Po Pos • Issiea Saccua • Bad Dudes • Black Fag • Horses • Sex Eyes
August 19: Giant Drag • Silversun Pick Ups • Envy • The Thermals • Dios Malos • Darker My Love • Foreign Born • Subtitle • Hit Me Back • Brother Reade • Chuck Ragan • Graf Orlock • The Rolling Blackouts • Whiskey Biscuit • Sleeping People • Strange Boys
August 20: Dead Meadow • the Ponys • Erase Errate • Mika MIko • Midnight Movies • Gris Gris • Icarus Line • Plot to Blow up The Eiffel Tower • Partyline • Wires on Fire • The Adored • Bobby Birdman • Barr • Matt & Kim • No Age

=== 2007 ===
August 25 & 26, 2007

@ Echo, Echoplex, Rec Center

August 25: The Explosion • The Fuse! • Lavender Diamond • Busdriver • Boom Bip • American Steel • Entrance • the Mae Shi • Fleshies • Bobby Birdman • Thee More Shallows • Greg Ashley of Gris Gris • Upsilon Acrux • Residual Echoes • Imaad Wasif • Times New Viking • Hit Me Back, • Brother Reade • Wooden Shjips • Love or Perish • Devon Williams • Japanese Motors

August 26: Deerhunter • Indian Jewelry • The Blood Arm • Midnight Movies • Jay Reatard • Foreign Born • Pissed Jeans • No Age • xBxRx • Darker My Love • The Nice Boys • Langhorne Slim • Great Northern • Triclops • Red Fang • Best Fwends • Whispertown 2000 • Moonrats • Rumspringa • the Strange Boys • 60 Watt Kid • Abe Vigoda • the Muslims (Soft Pack) • The Prayers • Bad Dudes • Jail Wedding Comedy: Jonah Ray • Bob Odenkirk • Josh Fadem • Matt Braunger • Cracked Out • Anthony Jeselnik • Aziz Ansari

=== 2008 ===
August 30 & 31 2008

@ the Echo, Echoplex, Jensen Rec Center, Taix

No Age • Negative Approach • Matt & Kim • Fucked Up • Two Gallants • Ladyhawk • David Vandervelde • Glass Candy • High Places • Paint it Black • Off with their Heads • Past Lives • Mae Shi • Halloween Swim Team • Underground Railroad to Candyland • Japanther • Mika Miko • Monotonix • The Strange Boys • Trash Talk • Anavan • Frank Fairfield • Michael Runion • Dimitri Coats • Tod Adrian Wisenbacker • Preacher and the Knife • Triumph of Lethargy Skinned Alive to Death • Mannequin Men • Best Fwends • Crystal Antlers • War Tapes • Frank Farfield • Graham Forest • Nodzz • Witch Hats • Rusty Lazer Comedy: Bob Odenkirk • Jeff Garlin • Josh Fadem • Matt Dwyer • Jonah Ray • Andy Daly • Matt Besser • Matt Braunger • Natasha Leggero • Jarrett Grode • Kyle Kinane • Brody Stevens

=== 2009 ===
September 5, 2009

@ LA State Historic Park

Black Lips • Tim & Eric • Lightning Bolt • No Age • Converge • Lucero • Fucked Up • Glass Candy • Dillinger Escape Plan • Torche • The Thermals • Times New Viking • Wavves • Mika Miko • Darker My Love • Crystal Antlers • Woods • Telepathe • Peanut Butter Wolf • Japanther • the Strange Boys • Cold Cave • Kurt Vile • Avi Buffalo • Dios • Eat Skull • Ninjasonik • Nobunny • Carbonas • Har Mar Superstar

=== 2010 ===
September 4, 2010

@ LA State Historic Park

The Rapture • Panda Bear • Sleep • Dead Man's Bones • Unbroken • !!! • Man Man • 7Seconds • Thee Oh Sees • The Mountain Goats • Ted Leo & the Pharmacists • Local Natives • Delorean • Cold Cave • Ariel Pink's Haunted Graffiti • Washed Out • Wavves • School of Seven Bells • AA Bondy • The Blow • Best Coast • Davila 666 • Titus Andronicus • The Soft Pack • Abe Vigoda • Warpaint • OFF! • Vetiver • Ceremony • Big Freedia • Screaming Females • Magic Kids • The Growlers • Lower Dens • Let's Wrestle & Cults Comedy: Janeane Garofalo • Skylar Bros • Matt Besser • David Koechner • Matt Braunger • Jen Kirkman • Brent Weinbach • Brody Stevens • Jarrett Grode • Matt Dwyer • Kyle Kinane • Harris Wittels • Joselyn Hughes • Josh Fadem

=== 2011 ===
September 3, 2011

@ LA State Historic Park

Descendents • Death from Above 1979 • Broken Social Scene • Explosions in the Sky • Guided by Voices • Simian Mobile Disco (Live) • Cold War Kids • Girls • No Age • Kid Dynamite • The Dead Milkmen • Dan Deacon • The Head and the Heart • Glass Candy • Cass McCombs • Four Tet • YACHT • The WEakerthans • Cults • Chromatics • Olivia Tremor Control • Smith Westerns • OFF! • The Strange Boys • Mr. Heavenly • Ty Segall • Japandroids • Pink Pink Mountaintops • Avi Buffalo • Fool's Gold • Nosaj Thing • Twin Sister • Title Fight • Touche Amore • Future Islands • Purity Ring • Tijuana Panthers • Girls • Julian Casablancas

=== 2012 ===
SEPTEMBER 1 & 2, 2012

@ LA State Historic Park

September 1: Refused • M83 • James Blake • Sleigh Bells • Quicksand • Simian Mobile Disco (Live) • Hot Snakes • Warpaint • Black Mountain • The Growlers • Fucked Up • Chromatics • The Vaselines • Future Islands • Tanlines • The Pains of Being Pure at Heart • Chairlift • Tycho • Purity Ring • Cloud Nothings • Two Gallants • Redd Kross • AA Bondy • Dam Funk • The Men • The Soft Pack • King Tuff • DJ Harvey • Moonface • John Maus • FIDLAR • Nite Jewel • The Suicide of Western Culture • The Orwells • Sandro Perri • White Arrows • Doldrums • Devin • JDH and Dave P Comedians: Baron Vaughn • Jonah Ray • Matt Braunger • Pete Holmes • Sklar Brothers • Greg Barris • Jim Hamilton • Neil Hamburger • Leo Allen • Eric Andre Show (Live)

September 2: Beirut • The Faint • Yeasayer • Nicolas Jaar (Live) • Desaparecidos • American Nightmare • Dinosaur JR • Against Me! • Turbonegro • Twin Shadow • Glass Candy • Liars • Health • Paul Banks • Cursive • Converge • King Khan & The Shrines • Lightning Bolt • Gold Panda • Aesop Rock • Atlas Sound • Black Dice • Ceremony • The Field • Givers • Father John Misty • Wild Nothing • Nick Waterhouse • Tiger & Woods • Papa • Joyce Manor • Allah Las • White Fence • DJ Coco • Daughn Gibson • Kishi Bashi • Lovely Bad Things • JDH & Dave P Comedy: Jerrod Carmichael • Joe Sib • DJ Douggound • Garfunkel & Oates • Rory Scovel • Maria Bamford • Sean O'Connor • Matt Dwyer • Brendon Walsh • Brent Weinbah • David Cross

=== 2013 ===
AUGUST 24 & 25, 2013

@ LA State Historic Park

August 24: Yeah Yeah Yeahs • TV on the Radio •FLAG • Deerhunter • Devendra Banhart • The Breeders (performing Last Splash) • The Locust • Toro y Moi • Death Grips • Roky Erickson • STRFKR • Simian Mobile Disco B2B Bicep • Charles Bradley & His Extraordinaires • Thee Oh Sees • Ty Segall • Dan Deacon • Nosaj Thing • Title Fight • Classixx • Delorean • Eleanor Friedberger • Joyce Manor • Horse Meat Disco • METZ • Crystal Antlers • Mikal Cronin • The Underachievers • Lemuria • Waxahatchee Comedians: Doug Benson • Brendon Small • Brett Gelman • Hampton Yount • Jim Hamilton • Jonah Ray

August 25: My Bloody Valentine • MGMT • Beach House • Solange • Yo La Tengo • Washed Out • Holy Ghost! • Melvins • No Age • Les Savy Fav • Shlohmo • Kurt Vile & the Violators • Flume • !!! • Jonathan Richman • Baroness • Poolside • Touché Amore • Omar Souleyman • Mac Demarco • Glasser • How to Dress Well • Chelsea Wolfe • The Orwells • Guards • Pional • Fear of Men • Antwon Comedians: Paul Scheer & Rob Huebel • Karen Kilgariff • Ron Funches • Chris Fairbanks • Matt Dwyer • Cameron Esposito • Kumail Nanjiani

=== 2014 ===
August 23 & 24, 2014

@ LA Sports Arena & Exposition Park

August 23: Phoenix • Interpol • Slowdive • Julian Casablancas + The Voidz • Grimes • Little Dragon • Caribou • Future Islands • Tycho • Slint • Against Me! • Albert Hammond Jr. • Todd Terje (Live) • Run The Jewels • Ty Segall • Boris • Man Man • DJ Harvey • Angel Olsen • XXYYXX • Mount Kimbie • Joyce Manor • Avey Tare's Slasher Flicks • Chet Faker • Mariachi El Bronx • Connan Mockasin • Daniel Avery • Jacco Gardner

August 24: The Strokes • Haim • The Blood Brothers • Flying Lotus • Blood Orange • Darkside • Jamie XX • Built To Spill • Earl Sweatshirt • Four Tet • Murder City Devils • Mac Demarco • The Bronx • Tanlines • John Talabot • Daphni • Presidents Of The USA • Deafheaven • La Dispute • Thundercat • Kindness • Kelela • Ryan Hemsworth • Les Sins • Benjamin Booker • Jessy Lanza • Balance & Composure • Joanna Gruesome • Twin Peaks

=== 2015 ===
August 22 & 23, 2015

@ LA Sports Arena & Exposition Park

August 22: Kanye West • Bloc Party • Chet Faker • The Jesus and Mary Chain • Purity Ring • Run the Jewels • !!! (Chk Chk Chk) • Flying Lotus • Savages • Simian Mobile Disco • Dinosaur Jr. • Jon Hopkins • The Drums • Kaytranada • Shlohmo • Cold Cave • Joyce Manor • Joy Orbison • Melody's Echo Chamber • Tennis • Ben UFO • BadBadNotGood • METZ • Alvvays • La Femme • Horse Meat Disco • Mikal Cronin • BRONCHO • Kevin Morby • DJ Dodger Stadium • Junk

August 23: Morrissey • D'Angelo and the Vanguard • Flume • FKA twigs • Solange • Belle and Sebastian • Spiritualized • Mac DeMarco • Death Grips • Toro y Moi • Nicolas Jaar • Dixon • Neon Indian • Battles • Thee Oh Sees • Laura Marling • Title Fight • DJ Harvey • Goldroom • Tobias Jesso Jr. • Health • Unknown Mortal Orchestra • Andrew Jackson Jihad • Evian Christ • Lower Dens • Hop Along • Girlpool • King Gizzard & the Lizard Wizard

=== 2016 ===
August 27 & 28, 2016

@ LA Sports Arena & Exposition Park

Line Up

Main Stage	Lawn Stage	Trees Stage	The Club Stage	Woods Stage
August 27
Kendrick Lamar; Tame Impala; Grimes; Vince Staples; DIIV	Hot Chip; AIR; Todd Terje & The Olsens; Jagwar Ma; Hop Along	Explosions in the Sky; Wolf Parade; Kelela; Ty Segall & The Muggers; Shellac; Classixx; Peter Bjorn and John; Alex G	Moby; Red Axes; Sheer Mag; Oneohtrix Point Never; Junior Boys; Kamaiyah; Head Wound City; Museum of Love; Boogie	Gerd Janson; Floating Points (DJ set); Cooper Saver
August 28
LCD Soundsystem; Grace Jones; Father John Misty; Blood Orange	Young Thug; Anohni; Charles Bradley; Wild Nothing; Preoccupations	Rae Sremmurd; Beach House; Mac DeMarco; The Black Lips; Saves the Day; Banks & Steelz; Denzel Curry	Chelsea Wolfe; Floating Points (Live); Gold Panda; Corbin; Uncle Acid & the Deadbeats; Julia Holter; Julien Baker	Andy Stott; Bicep; The Black Madonna; Honey Soundsystem

=== 2017 ===
July 21, 22 & 23, 2017

@ Exposition Park

July 21: Missy Elliott • Björk • Anderson .Paak • Flying Lotus • Slowdive • Majid Jordan • Angel Olsen • BADBADNOTGOOD • John Talabot • Thee Oh Sees • Beach Fossils • Horse Meat Disco • Hundred Waters • Survive • Kamaiyah • Royal Headache • Helena Hauff • Kirk Knight • Paranoid London • Kelly Lee Owens

July 22: Frank Ocean • A Tribe Called Quest • Erykah Badu • MGMT • Nicolas Jaar • King Krule • Sleep • Thundercat • The Drums • The Black Madonna • Built To Spill • Motor City Drum Ensemble • Cap'n Jazz • The Faint • NONAME • Arca + Jesse Kanda • Jonathan Richman • Perfume Genius • Daniel Avery • Seun Kuti & Egypt 80 • Mitski • Homeshake • Princess Nokia • Fatima Yamaha • Young Marco • Avalon Emerson • Big Thief

July 23: Nine Inch Nails • Iggy Pop • Solange • Run The Jewels • Mac DeMarco • Little Dragon • Hannibal Buress • Kehlani • 6lack • Chicano Batman • Mura Masa • Ty Segall • Talaboman • Blonde Redhead • DJ Harvey • Temples • Tiga • Whitney • TR/ST • Moses Sumney • Omar-S • Andy Shauf • Joey Purp • Honey Soundsystem • Cherry Glazerr • Nadia Rose • Julia Jacklin
