= Black Lips! =

Studio album by Black Lips
- Released: March 18, 2003
- Genre: Garage punk, lo-fi
- Length: 30:59
- Label: Bomp!

Black Lips chronology
Black Lips! (2003)	We Did Not Know the Forest Spirit Made the Flowers Grow (2004)

Professional ratings
Review scores
Source	Rating
AllMusic	3/5 stars
KLYAM	A−

Black Lips! is the Black Lips' debut LP album, released in 2003. The cover is from the silent movie Les Vampires (1915).

== Track listing ==
1. "Throw It Away" – 2:33
2. "Freakout" – 1:43
3. "Ain't No Deal" – 2:25
4. "Stone Cold" – 2:02
5. "I've Got a Knife" – 1:14
6. "Down and Out" – 2:11
7. "Steps" – 1:28
8. "Fad" – 1:49
9. "Sweet Kin" – 2:00
10. "Crazy Girl" – 1:52
11. "Everybody Loves a Cocksucker" – 3:20
12. "Can't Get Me Down" – 2:30
13. "You're Dumb" – 3:41
14. "Say Hello to the Postman" – 2:11

Tracks 11, 12 and 4 produced, mixed and mastered by Eric Gagnon/Eric El Camino. Bass on "Stone Cold" by Gagnon.
