= The Selmanaires =

- Origin: Atlanta, Georgia, United States
- Genres: Indie rock
- Years active: 2003–2010
- Labels: International Hits; Rob's House Records; Double Phantom Records
- Members: Tommy Chung; Herb Harris; Jason Harris; Mario Schambon; Adron

The Selmanaires were an American Indie electronic band from Atlanta, Georgia.

Influenced by the sounds of myriads cultures and eras, the Selmanaires' sound is a musical collage which dances the boundary between tradition and experiment. It was formed in 2003 on Selman Street, Atlanta, Georgia by Herb Harris, Jason Harris, and Tommy Chung. The group soon expanded to a four-piece with Mathis Hunter on guitar and percussion. In 2008 Mario Schambon joined on percussion. On occasion, Adron is on vocals and guitar. Their dynamic is based on a mutual love of the hypnotic sounds of Can and Kraftwerk, Brazilian Bossa Nova and Tropicalia, and 60s pop from all around the globe. The Selmanaires' first show was in 2003 at a house party in Atlanta. After a few years of building a local following, they began touring the country in 2006. In 2007, The Selmanaires embarked on a national tour with hometown friends The Black Lips. On a national tour with Broadcast and Atlas Sound in October/November 2009, they pulled double duty, performing both as The Selmanaires and also as backing band for Bradford Cox as Atlas Sound. They have also performed shows with Wire, Pylon, and Deerhunter. The band ceased in 2010.

== Discography ==
- Here Come The Selmanaires CD (2005) (International Hits)
- "Standing In Line At An Elevator" 7" (2006) (Rob's House Records)
- "Whirlyball" 7" (w/ Deerhunter, The Coathangers, & The Carbonas) (2007) (Chunklet)
- The Air Salesmen (2008) (International Hits)
- "Just To Get Yr Love/ Verdigris Intrigue" 7" (2008) (International Hits)
- "Princess Illusionist Frankenstein" 7" (2008) (Rob's House Records)
- Tempo Temporal CD (2009) (self-released)
- "Sinister Season/B. Spell" 7" (Double Phantom Records) (2010)
- "Authenlectricity/WindTruStar" (2010) digital single
