= Satanus =

Satanus may refer to:

- Satanus, one of the half-demon brother and sister Blaze and Satanus in DC Comics
- Satanus (comics), a dinosaur character in Judge Dredd and other 2000 AD comic strips
- "Satanus", the seventh episode of Les Vampires
