= Mundo Nuevo (disambiguation) =

Mundo Nuevo was a literary magazine founded by Emir Rodríguez Monegal.

Mondo Nuevo may also refer to:

- Mundo Nuevo (Junín district), a district of Junín Department, Mendoza, Argentina
- Mundo Nuevo (Rivadavia district), a district of Rivadavia Department, Mendoza, Argentina

== See also ==
- Los Valientes del Mundo Nuevo, a 2007 garage rock album by Black Lips
- New World (disambiguation), English translation
