= Japanese Motors =

American garage punk band

- Origin: Costa Mesa, California
- Genres: Garage punk
- Years active: 2004–2010 (hiatus)
- Labels: Die Slaughterhaus Records; Vice Records
- Past members: Alex Knost; Nolan Hall; Chris Vail; Andrew Atkinson

Japanese Motors is a garage punk band from Costa Mesa, California active during the 2000s. They released one studio album, the self-titled Japanese Motors, on Vice Records in 2008.

== History ==
Japanese Motors were formed in 2004, led by Alex Knost, a professional surfer who served as the band's singer. Knost had previously appeared in the 2003 surfing documentary Step into Liquid. The band's other members were guitarist Nolan Hall, bassist Chris Vail, and drummer Andrew Atkinson. Their first release was the single "Single Fins & Safety Pins" on the Black Lips' label Die Slaughterhaus Records. The band subsequently signed to Vice Records, who released a new version of the "Single Fins & Safety Pins" single in the summer of 2008, as well as the band's self-titled debut album that fall.

On January 12, 2010, OC Weekly reported that Japanese Motors had gone on indefinite hiatus. In an interview later that month, Knost told OC Weekly that he and the other members of Japanese Motors had mutually agreed to put the band on hiatus. At the time, Knost wanted to focus on his new band, Tomorrows Tulips, about which he said he felt more passionate than he did about Japanese Motors.

== Critical reception ==
Multiple critics compared the Japanese Motors' sound to that of the Strokes. Some reviews of Japanese Motors' self-titled album criticized it for being unoriginal, arguing that it sounded too similar to the Strokes' music. For example, Mikael Wood described the band as "a West Coast beach-bum version of the Strokes" and quipped that the album was "[a] good time, if not a terribly memorable one." Similarly, Adam Moerder wrote in Pitchfork that the band "sound like a West Coast version of the Strokes or Black Lips", and referred to the song "Regrets a Paradise" as a "transparent Strokes rip". In a two-star review of the album for Slant, Steven Rybicki wrote that Japanese Motors "wanders off into surf rock while dosed on the Strokes to varying degrees of success." Rybicki's review also stated that "[e]ven though they only offer indulgent pseudo-hip detachment here, Japanese Motors may mature and refine their ability to create a cozy atmosphere." Moerder's Pitchfork review of the Japanese Motors album gave it a 3.8 out of 10, concluding, "The debut's boring, not awful, but until the band stops sounding like they have a hundred cooler things to do than be in a studio, it's hard to imagine them as anything more than surf muzak."

== Discography ==
- Japanese Motors (Vice, 2008)

== Videography ==
- "Single Fins & Safety Pins" (2008, dir. The Malloys)
- "Better Trends" (2008, dir. Alex Kopps)
