= Underneath the Rainbow =

Studio album by Black Lips
- Released: March 17, 2014
- Genres: Indie rock, garage rock, blues rock
- Length: 33:59
- Label: Vice
- Producers: Black Lips, Ed Rawls, Justin McKnight, Patrick Carney, Tom Brenneck

Black Lips chronology
Arabia Mountain (2011)	Underneath the Rainbow (2014)	Satan’s Graffiti or God’s Art? (2017)

Professional ratings
Aggregate scores
Source	Rating
Metacritic	71/100
Review scores
Source	Rating
AllMusic	2.5/5 stars
The Austin Chronicle	89/100
Blurt	3/5 stars
DIY	3/5 stars
The Guardian	4/5 stars
MusicOMH	3.5/5 stars
NOW	2/5 stars
Pitchfork	6.3/10
Rolling Stone	3.5/5 stars

Underneath the Rainbow is the seventh studio album by American garage rock band Black Lips, released on March 17, 2014.

== Track listing ==
1. "Drive by Buddy"
2. "Smiling"
3. "Make You Mine"
4. "Funny"
5. "Dorner Party"
6. "Justice After All"
7. "Boys in the Wood"
8. "Waiting"
9. "Do the Vibrate"
10. "I Don't Wanna Go Home"
11. "Dandelion Dust"
12. "Dog Years"

== Personnel ==
Black Lips

- Cole Alexander – guitar, vocals
- Jared Swilley – bass, vocals
- Ian St. Pé – guitar, vocals
- Joe Bradley – drums, vocals

Additional personnel

- Tom Brenneck – baritone guitar
- Andrew Greene – horns
- Dave Guy – horns
- Jared Tankel – horns
- Leon Michels – horns
- Luc Paradis – artwork
- Dave Girard – design
- Nathan Yarborough – engineer
- Roger Moutenot – engineer
- Beau Vallis – mixing engineer
- Joe LaPorta – mastering
- Jimmy Douglass – mixing
- Mick Rock – photography
- Justin McKnight – production
- Patrick Carney – production
- Tom Brenneck – production
- Ed Rawls – production
