= Rob's House Records =

American record label

Rob's House Records is an American record label based out of Atlanta, Georgia. It was created in 2005 by Trey Lindsay to cater to the unique, but underexposed growing underground music scene in Atlanta, Ga. Rob's House Records caters to many genres of music including punk, indie rock, math rock, folk, and electronic. Its primary release format is 7-inch records.

== History ==
The name Rob's House Records comes from the record label designation on a split 7-inch record released by Atlanta bands The Orphins and The Liverhearts in 2003. At the time of the release, neither band had any record label affiliation, and it was decided that the record would be self-released. Being that all the members of the bands lived in rented properties at the time of the release, it was decided that a more permanent address needed to be printed on the back of the label. A mutual friend of both bands, named Rob, owned a house in Atlanta and agreed to loan his address for the purpose. The name Rob's House Records was printed in the bottom left hand corner of the 7-inch record. Initially the name was intended only for this one release.

Two years later, Trey Lindsay of The Liverhearts, after returning from a study abroad program in Paris, abruptly quit The Liverhearts after deciding he wanted to focus on other projects. Lindsay began work on the creation of a record label that would help to promote the local underground music scene within Atlanta. The primary format of release would be 7-inch records. With permission from both The Orphins and The Liverhearts, the name Rob's House records was resurrected in 2005. In 2006, Lindsay recruited Travis Flagel to help with the growing label.

== Discography ==
- rhr001: The Orphins / The Liverhearts 7-inch
- rhr002: Anna Kramer 7-inch
- rhr003: The Selmanaires 7-inch
- rhr004: Shock Cinema 7-inch
- rhr005: A Fir-Ju Well 7-inch
- rhr006: Rizzudo 7-inch
- rhr007: Deerhunter/Hubcap City Split 7-inch
- rhr008: The Flakes 7-inch
- rhr009: Mudcat 7-inch
- rhr010: Black Lips 7-inch
- rhr011: Herb Harris 7-inch
- rhr012: Carbonas 7-inch
- rhr013: God's America 7-inch
- rhr014: Zano w/ Chris Devoe & Mexcellent 7-inch
- rhr015: Jason Harris 7-inch
- rhr016: Thee Crucials 7-inch
- rhr017: Nikki Sudden / Southern Bitch 7-inch
- rhr018: Classic Plus 7-inch
- rhr019: Jude Stevens (Pete DeLorenzo) 7-inch
- rhr020: Old King Cole Younger/ Atlas Sound 10-inch
- rhr021: All Night Drug Prowling Wolves 7-inch
- rhr022: Deerhunter 7-inch
- rhr023: Saba Lou 7-inch
- rhr024: Beat Beat Beat 7-inch
- rhr025: Cheveu 7-inch
- rhr026: SIDS - Acid One 7-inch
- rhr027: Fe Fi Fo Fums 7-inch
- rhr028: The Gaye Blades 7-inch
- rhr029: The Gaye Blades 7-inch
- rhr030: The Coathangers CD/LP
- rhr031: Black Lips / Subsonics 7-inch
- rhr032: Gentleman Jesse & His Men / Joseph Plunket 7-inch
- rhr033: Baby Shakes 7-inch
- rhr034: The Weakends 7-inch
- rhr035: Demon's Claws - Fcked on K 7-inch
- rhr036: Slab City 7-inch
- rhr037: The Hipshakes 7-inch
- rhr038: Jack Of Heart 7-inch
- rhr039: Lover! 7-inch
- rhr040: Hunx & His Punx 7-inch
- rhr041: Sonic Chicken 4 7-inch
- rhr042: The Selmanaires 7-inch
- rhr043: Golden Triangle 7-inch
- rhr044: Bobby & The Soft Spots 7-inch
- rhr045: Black Lips / Carbonas / Gentleman Jesse / Predator 7-inch
- rhr046: The Weakends LP
- rhr047: Jacuzzi Boys 7-inch
- rhr048: SIDS - Winter 7-inch
- rhr049: Brimstone Howl 7-inch
- rhr050: Demon's Claws - Weird Ways 7-inch
- rhr051: Personal & The Pizzas / Bobby Ubangi 7-inch
- rhr053: Bobby Ubangi - Inside the Mind of Bobby Ubangi LP

== See also ==
- List of record labels
