= Les Vampires =

1915–1916 film serial by Louis Feuillade

- French teaser campaign poster
- Directed by: Louis Feuillade
- Written by: Louis Feuillade
- Starring: Édouard Mathé; Musidora; Marcel Lévesque
- Cinematography: Manichoux
- Music by: Robert Israel (2000); Éric le Guen (2008); Mont Alto Motion Picture Orchestra (2012)
- Production company: Gaumont
- Distributed by: Comptoir Ciné-Location
- Release date: 13 November 1915
- Running time: 10 episodes (417 minutes)
- Country: France
- Language: Silent (with French intertitles)

Les Vampires (French pronunciation: [le vɑ̃piʁ]) is a 1915–1916 French silent crime serial film written and directed by Louis Feuillade. Set in Paris, it stars Édouard Mathé, Musidora and Marcel Lévesque. The main characters are a journalist and his friend who become involved in trying to uncover and stop a bizarre underground Apaches criminal gang, known as the Vampires, who are not the mythical beings their name might suggest. The serial consists of ten episodes, which vary greatly in length. It was produced and distributed by Feuillade's company Gaumont. Due to its stylistic similarities with Feuillade's other crime serials Fantômas and Judex, the three are often considered a trilogy.

Fresh from the success of Feuillade's previous serial, Fantômas, and facing competition from rival company Pathé, Feuillade made the serial quickly and inexpensively with very little written script. Upon its initial release Les Vampires was given negative reviews by critics for its dubious morality and its lack of cinematic techniques compared to other films. However, it was a massive success with its wartime audience, making Musidora a star of French cinema.

The serial has since come under re-evaluation and is considered by many to be Feuillade's magnum opus and a cinematic masterpiece. It is recognised for developing thriller techniques, adopted by Alfred Hitchcock and Fritz Lang, and avant-garde cinema, inspiring Luis Buñuel, Henri Langlois, Alain Resnais, and André Breton. It is included in the book 1001 Movies You Must See Before You Die.

== Plot ==
=== Episode table ===
No.	English title	French title	Original release date	Runtime
1	"The Severed Head"	"La Tête coupée"	13 November 1915	33 mins.
2	"The Ring That Kills"	"La Bague qui tue"	13 November 1915	15 mins.
3	"The Red Codebook"	"Le Cryptogramme rouge"	4 December 1915	39 mins.
4	"The Spectre"	"Le Spectre"	7 January 1916	30 mins.
5	"Dead Man's Escape"	"L'Évasion du mort"	28 January 1916	35 mins.
6	"Hypnotic Eyes"	"Les Yeux qui fascinent"	24 March 1916	54 mins.
7	"Satanas"	"Satanas"	15 April 1916	46 mins.
8	"The Thunder Master"	"Le Maître de la foudre"	12 May 1916	52 mins.
9	"The Poisoner"	"L'Homme des poisons"	2 June 1916	48 mins.
10	"The Terrible Wedding"	"Les Noces sanglantes"	30 June 1916	60 mins.

=== Episode 1 – "The Severed Head" ===
Episode 1 : The Severed Head (1915)

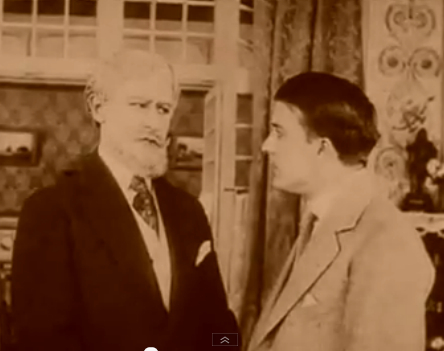
Philippe Guérande (Édouard Mathé, right) interviews Dr. Nox in "The Severed Head".

Philippe Guérande, crack reporter for the newspaper "Mondial" is investigating a criminal organisation called the Vampires. He receives a telegram at work stating that the decapitated body of the national security agent in charge of the Vampire investigations, Inspector Durtal, has been found in the swamps near Saint-Clement-Sur-Cher, with the head missing. After being turned down by the local magistrate, he spends the night in a nearby castle owned by Dr. Nox, an old friend of his father, along with Mrs. Simpson, an American multimillionairess who wants to buy the property. After waking up in the night, Philippe finds a note in his pocket saying "Give up your search, otherwise bad luck awaits you! – The Vampires", and discovers a mysterious passage behind a painting in his room. Meanwhile, Mrs. Simpson's money and jewels are stolen in her sleep by a masked thief, but Philippe is suspected of the crime. Philippe again visits the magistrate, who now believes his case, and they trick Dr. Nox and Mrs. Simpson into waiting in an anteroom. At the castle, Philippe and the magistrate find the head of Inspector Durtal hidden in the passage in Philippe's room. Back in the anteroom, they find that Mrs. Simpson is dead and that Dr. Nox has vanished. Her pocket contains a note from the Grand Vampire saying that he has murdered the real Dr. Nox and is now assuming his identity.

=== Episode 2 – "The Ring That Kills" ===
Episode 2 : The Ring That Kills (1915)

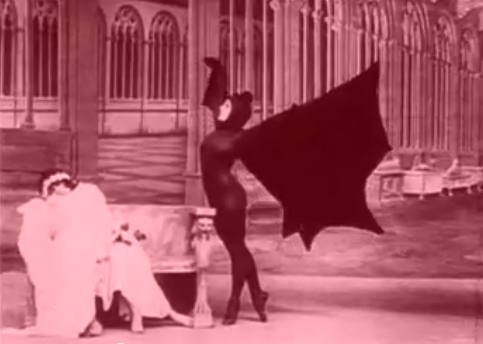
Marfa Koutiloff (Stacia Napierkowska) dancing as a vampire bat in "The Ring That Kills"

The Grand Vampire, in disguise as Count de Noirmoutier, reads that ballerina Marfa Koutiloff, who is engaged to Philippe, will perform a ballet called The Vampires. To prevent her from publicising the Vampires' activities and to deter Philippe, he gives Marfa a poisoned ring before her performance, which kills her onstage. Amidst the panicking crowds, Philippe recognises the Grand Vampire and follows him to an abandoned fort and is captured by the gang. They agree to interrogate Philippe at midnight and execute him at dawn. Philippe finds that the Vampire guarding him is one of his co-workers, Oscar-Cloud Mazamette. They decide to work together and capture the Grand Inquisitor when he arrives at midnight. They bind and hood the Grand Inquisitor, and set him up for execution in place of Philippe. At dawn the Vampires arrive for the execution, but the police raid the lair. The Vampires escape, but as they flee they mistakenly execute their own Grand Inquisitor, who turns out to be the Chief Justice of the Supreme Court.

=== Episode 3 – "The Red Codebook" ===
Episode 3 : The Red Codebook (1915)

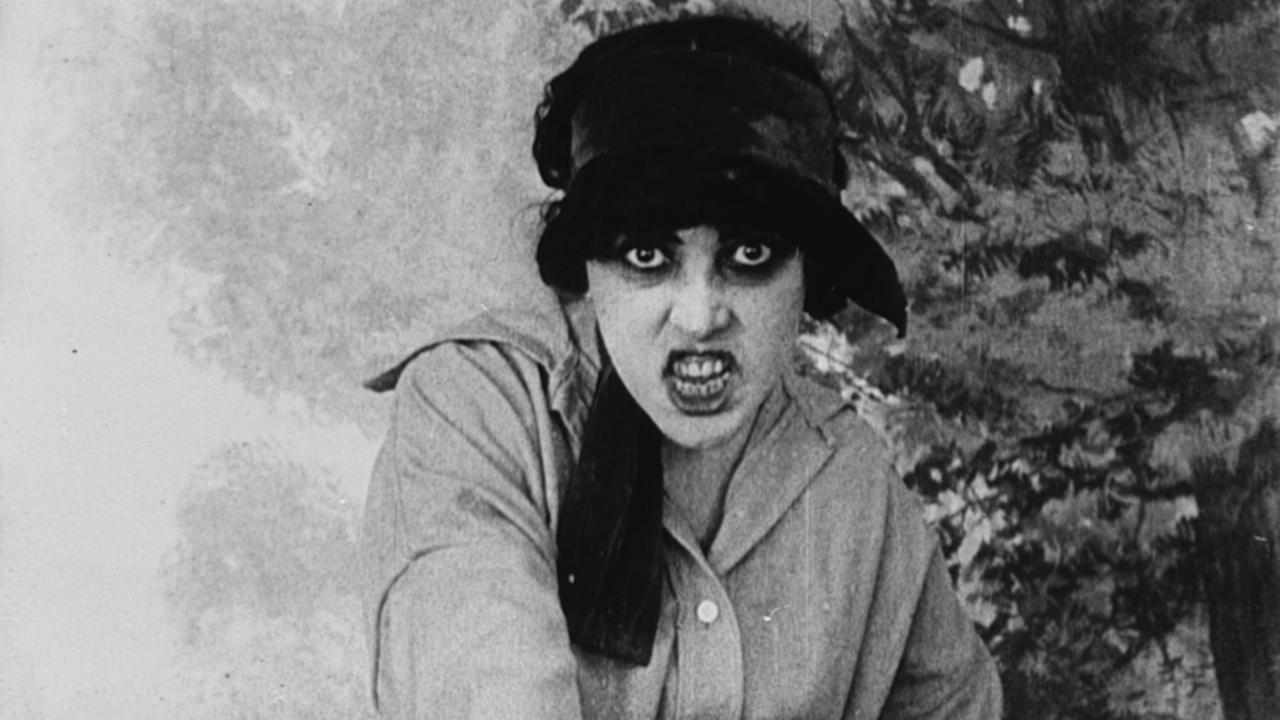
Irma Vep (Musidora) singing in the "Howling Cat" nightclub in "The Red Codebook"

While faking illness to get off work, Philippe tries to decode a red booklet that he lifted from the Grand Inquisitor's body, which contains the crimes of the Vampires. He discovers that his house is under surveillance by the Vampires, so he leaves in disguise. Following clues in the booklet he arrives at "The Howling Cat" night club. Performing there is Irma Vep, whose name Philippe realises is an anagram for vampire. After her act, the Grand Vampire assigns Irma to retrieve the red booklet. As Philippe returns home Mazamette arrives, along with a poison pen he stole from the Grand Vampire. A few days later, Irma arrives at their house disguised as a new maid, but Philippe recognises her. She tries to poison him, but fails. His mother leaves to meet her brother after receiving word that he has been in a car accident, but it turns out to be a trap and she is captured by the Vampires. While Philippe is asleep, Irma lets another Vampire into his home but Philippe shoots them. They escape, however, because his gun was loaded with blanks. In a shack in the slums, Philippe's mother is held by Father Silence, a deaf-mute, and is forced to sign a ransom note, but she kills him with Mazamette's poison pen and escapes.

=== Episode 4 – "The Spectre" ===
Episode 4 : The Spectre (1916)

The Grand Vampire, under the alias of a real estate broker "Treps", meets Juan-José Moréno, a businessman, who asks for an apartment with a safe. The Grand Vampire puts Moréno into an apartment whose safe is rigged to be opened from the rear through the party wall of an apartment belonging to Irma Vep and the Grand Vampire. However, the case Moréno places inside contains the Vampires’ black attire. Later, in disguise as bank secretary "Juliette Bertaux", Irma learns that a man called M. Metadier has to bring ₣300,000 to another branch. In the event that he is unable to make the delivery, "Juliette Bertaux" will bring it. Soon afterward, M. Metadier is murdered by the Vampires and his body thrown from a train. When Irma is about to take the money for him a spectre of M. Metadier appears and takes it instead. The Grand Vampire pursues the spectre, who escapes down a manhole. Later that day, Mme. Metadier appears at the bank, saying she has not seen her husband in days. They also find out that the money has not been delivered. Philippe learns of this and goes to the bank in disguise. Recognising the secretary as Irma Vep, he finds her address and a few hours later sneaks in, using Mazamette as a ploy. Irma and the Grand Vampire open the safe from their side, only to find Metadier's body and the money. Philippe tries to capture them but is knocked down and they escape. Philippe calls the police just as Moréno enters and finds his safe opened from the other side. He walks through and is caught by Philippe. Moréno is revealed to be another criminal in disguise, and claims not to have killed Metadier, but to have found his body by the train tracks where the Vampires had dumped it. Moréno found Metadier's letter of authority on his corpse, took Metadier's body home, disguised himself as Metadier, put the body in his safe, assumed Metadier's identity, took the money, and put it too in his safe. The upshot is that the money is now in the Vampires' possession. The police arrive and arrest Moréno.

=== Episode 5 – "Dead Man's Escape" ===
Episode 5 : Dead Man's Escape (1916)

The examining magistrate from Saint-Clement-Sur-Cher relocates to Paris and is assigned to the Vampire case and the Moréno affair. After being summoned to the magistrate, Moréno ostensibly commits suicide using a concealed cyanide capsule. His body is left in his cell, but during the night he wakes up, very much alive. He kills the night-watchman and takes his clothes, escaping from the prison. He is noticed by Mazamette, who is suffering from insomnia. The following morning, Moréno is found to have escaped. While writing an account of the events, Philippe is pulled out of his window by the Vampires and whisked into a large costume box. He is driven away and the box is unloaded, but incompetently, and it slides down a large flight of stairs. The Vampires retreat and Philippe is let out by two bystanders. He visits the costume designer Pugenc whose name and box number (13) are on the costume box, just missing Moréno and his gang who have bought police uniforms for a scheme of their own. Philippe learns from Pugenc that the costume box was to go to Baron de Mortesalgues on Maillot Avenue, and realises that "Mortesalgues" must be another alias of the Grand Vampire. Later, Moréno confronts Philippe in a café, but when Philippe calls for the nearby policemen, they turn out to be part of Moréno's gang and he is again captured. Meanwhile, Mazamette breaks into Moréno's hideout. Philippe is taken there to be hanged by the gang, unless he can give them means to revenge themselves against the Vampires. He tells them that Baron de Mortesalgues is the Grand Vampire, and they spare him, tying him up. Mazamette appears and frees him. That evening, the Grand Vampire, in disguise as Baron de Mortesalgues, holds a party for his "niece", who is Irma Vep in disguise. The party attracts many members of the Parisian aristocracy. "Mortesalgues" reveals that at midnight there will be a surprise; but the "surprise" is a sleeping-gas attack on the guests. The Vampires steal all of the guests' valuables while they are unconscious. The Vampires flee with the stolen items on the top of their car, but Moréno, forewarned by Philippe, robs the Vampires and sends Philippe a letter telling him that, for the moment, they are even. Mazamette visits Philippe; he is angry with their lack of progress and wants to quit. Philippe opens a book of La Fontaine's Fables and points to the line, "in all things, one must take the end into account", and Mazamette's resolve is renewed.

=== Episode 6 – "Hypnotic Eyes" ===
Episode 6 : Hypnotic Eyes (1916)

Juan-José Moréno (Fernand Herrmann) confronts Irma Vep in "Hypnotic Eyes".

Fifteen days have passed since the events at Maillot. Moréno is looking for clues to lead him to the Vampires, and reads in a paper that a Fontainebleau notary has been murdered by them; as he possess a gaze with a terrible hypnotic power, he takes control of his new maid, Laura, to turn her into his slave. Meanwhile, Philippe and Mazamette see a newsreel on the murder inquest, in which they spot Irma Vep and the Grand Vampire. They cycle to Fontainebleau to investigate. En route they spot an American tourist, Horatio Werner, riding fast into the forest, and follow him. He places a box under one of the boulders, and they take it. The Grand Vampire, who is staying in the Royal Hunt Hotel under the pseudonym of Count Kerlor, along with Irma in disguise as his son, Viscount Guy, reads in a paper that George Baldwin, an American millionaire, has been robbed of $200,000. Whoever can capture the criminal, Raphael Norton, who has fled to Europe with the actress Ethel Florid, will be awarded the unspent balance of the loot. "Kerlor" notices that Mr. and Mrs. Werner, who are staying at the hotel, are distressed by this notice, and concludes that Mr. Werner is Raphael Norton. Philippe and Mazamette arrive at the hotel and find that the Vampires are based there. In a different hotel they force open the box and find Baldwin's stolen money inside. Moréno comes to the Royal Hunt in disguise. While the Grand Vampire tells the hotel guests a story, Irma breaks into the Werners' suite, finding a map leading to the box in the forest. When she leaves, she is captured and chloroformed by Moréno, who takes the map. While his gang take Irma away, he dresses his hypnotised maid, Laura, as Irma Vep and tells her to give the Vampires the map. Once one of the Vampires (Mlle. Édith) follows the map to get the treasure, Moréno's gang ambushes her, only to find that Philippe has already taken it. Moréno demands that the Grand Vampire ransom Irma. In the early morning, the police raid the hotel and find that Werner is actually Norton, so Philippe and Mazamette win the money. Moréno falls in love with Irma and decides not to return her to the Grand Vampire. Instead, he hypnotises her and causes her to write a confession of her involvement in the murders of the Fontainbleau notary (in this episode), Metadier (episode 4), the ballerina Marfa Koutiloff (episode 2), and Dr. Nox (episode 1). The Grand Vampire comes to meet Moréno, but Moréno compels Irma to kill him by hypnotic command. The episode ends with the now-wealthy Mazamette informing a dozen adoring journalists that "although vice is seldom punished, virtue is always rewarded".

=== Episode 7 – "Satanas" ===
Episode 7 : Satanas (1916)

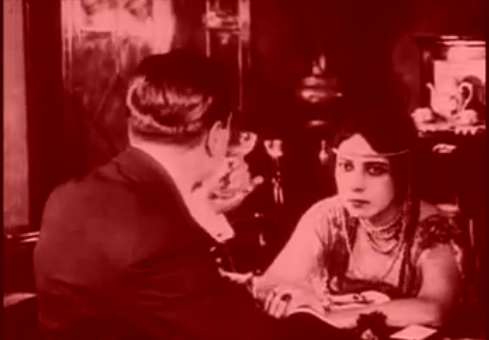
Irma Vep and Juan-José Moréno in the "Happy Shack" cabaret in "Satanas"

Irma Vep has become Moréno's mistress. A mysterious man arrives at Moréno's home, and shows that he knows that the Grand Vampire's body is inside a trunk. Moréno tries to get rid of him, but he is paralysed by a pin in the man's glove. The man reveals himself to be the true Grand Vampire, Satanas, and that the first was a subordinate. While at a cabaret called the "Happy Shack", Moréno and Irma receive a note from Satanas saying they will see proof of his power at two o'clock. At two he fires a powerful cannon at the "Happy Shack", largely destroying it. Meanwhile, Philippe decides to visit Mazamette, but he is out "chasing the girls". He hides as Mazamette arrives home, drunk, with two women and a friend, who he later chases out angrily at gunpoint. The next morning, Irma and Moréno go to Satanas’s home to surrender, and Satanas offers them the chance to work with him, informing them that American millionaire George Baldwin is staying at the Park Hotel. Satanas wants Baldwin's signature. One of Moréno's accomplices, Lily Flower, goes to the Park Hotel and poses as an interviewer from "Modern Woman" magazine and through trickery gets Baldwin to sign a blank piece of paper. Afterwards, Irma Vep enters and dupes Baldwin into recording his voice saying "Parisian women are the most charming I've ever seen. All right!" Lily Flower brings Baldwin's signature to Moréno's home, and Moréno writes out an order (over Baldwin's signature) to pay Lily Flower $100,000. Moréno's gang seize the hotel telephone operator of Baldwin's hotel, and Irma Vep takes her place by using a forged note. When the bank cashier calls Baldwin to confirm that he has given a very large draft to an attractive Parisian woman, Irma Vep intercepts the call, and plays the recording she made of Baldwin's voice, and the cashier is persuaded. While Lily Flower is taking the money, Mazamette comes in, recognises her from the "Happy Shack", and follows her, seeing her hand the money to a man in a taxi – Moréno. Moréno gives Satanas the money, but he is given it back as a present. Philippe and Mazamette capture Lily Flower at her home and make her call Moréno and tell him to come, but when he and Irma Vep arrive they fall into a trap and are caught by the police.

=== Episode 8 – "The Thunder Master" ===
Episode 8 : The Thunder Master (1916)

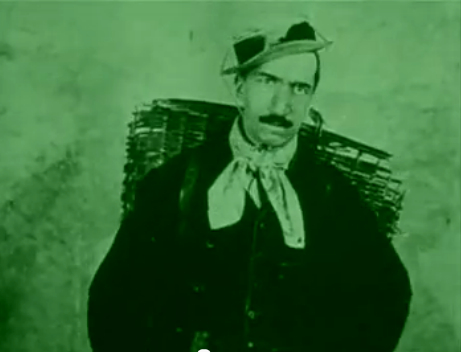
Oscar-Cloud Mazamette (Marcel Lévesque) dressed as a rag-picker in "The Thunder Master"

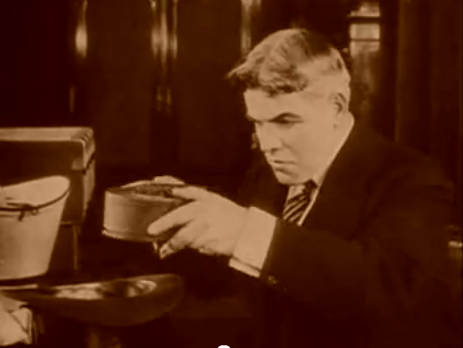
Satanas assembles a bomb in "The Thunder Master".

Irma Vep, sentenced to life imprisonment, has been sent to the Saint-Lazare Prison. A transfer order is sent to the prison to send her to a penal colony in Algeria. On the day of her departure, she finds out that Moréno has been executed. Satanas follows Irma's transportation route, stopping at a seaside hotel in disguise as a priest. At the port, he gives some written religious comfort to the prisoners, but Irma's copy contains a secret message saying "the ship will blow up" and giving her directions on how to safeguard herself. Satanas destroys the ship with his cannon. Meanwhile, Philippe finds through the red codebook that the explosive shell that landed on the "Happy Shack" came from Montmartre, and Mazamette goes to investigate. His son, Eustache Mazamette, is sent home from school for bad behaviour, so they go to "investigate" together. They find some men loading boxes into a house, and notice one of the top hat cases contains a shell. Later, reading that no survivors have been found from the exploding ship, Satanas visits Philippe to avenge Irma's death. Satanas paralyses Phillipe with the poisoned pin in his glove and leaves a bomb in a top hat to kill him off. Mazamette arrives and throws the top hat out the window just in time. At Satanas’s home, Eustache is used as a ploy to hide Mazamette in a box, but Satanas sees this through a spy-hole. Satanas threatens Eustache, but Eustache shoots at Satanas, and the police raid the building and arrest him. After the action, they find that Mazamette's nose has been broken by Eustache's shot. Meanwhile, Irma is shown to have survived the blast on the ship, and is on her way back to Paris as a stowaway under a train. She is helped by the station staff and police, pretending that she is in "one of those eternal love stories beloved by popular imagination." She makes her way to the Vampire hangout, the "Howling Cat" nightclub, where she performs, and is rapturously greeted by the Vampires. Upon hearing of the arrest of Satanas, one of the Vampires, Venomous, appoints himself the new chief. By Satanas’s orders, they mail him an envelope containing a poisoned note, which he eats to commit suicide.

=== Episode 9 – "The Poisoner" ===
Episode 9 : The Poisoner (1916)

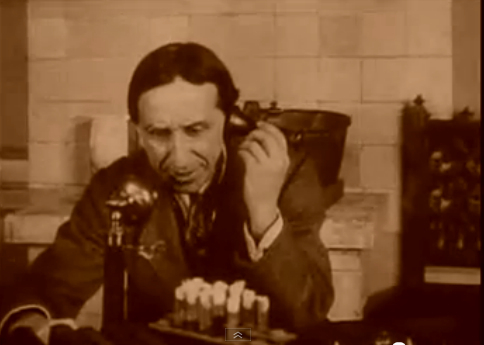
Venomous plotting against Philippe in "The Poisoner"

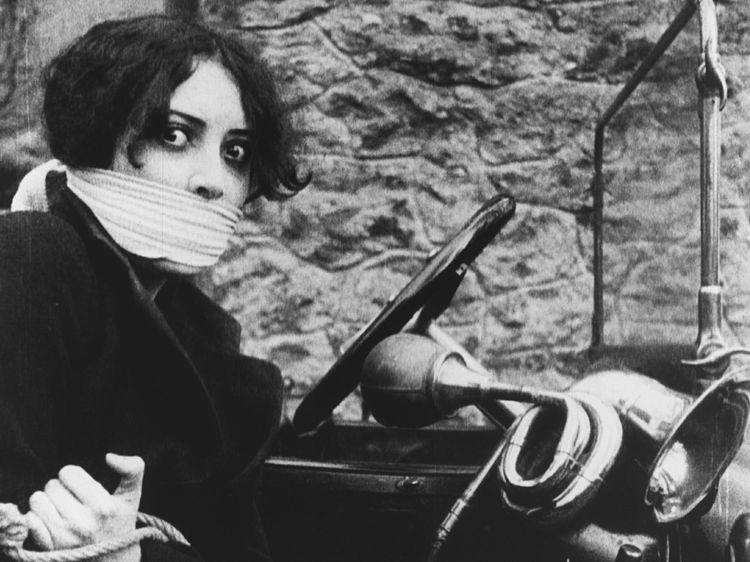
Irma Vep waiting for rescue in "The Poisoner"

Irma Vep is now a devoted collaborator of Venomous, who is set on getting rid of Philippe and Mazamette. He learns that Philippe is engaged to Jane Bremontier, and the following day Irma and Lily Flower rent an apartment above hers. Irma's maid, a Vampire also, hears that Philippe and Jane's engagement party will be catered for by the famous Béchamel House. Venomous cancels their catering order, and on the day of the party the Vampires appear instead. Jane's mother gives the concierges a bottle of the Vampires' champagne as a present, and just as dinner is served the male concierge, Leon Charlet, drinks it, is poisoned and dies. His wife stops the party guests from drinking their champagne just in time, and the Vampires make a hasty escape. A few days later, Mazamette and Philippe's mother pick up Jane and her mother in the night in order to take them to a safe retreat near Fontainebleau. Irma, who tries to fill the getaway car with soporific gas, is spotted by Mazamette, but Irma gasses him, and he is taken away asleep while Irma hides in a box on the car. Mazamette is dumped on the street and taken to the police station, believed to be drunk. When he wakens, he calls Philippe to warn him, but Irma slips out of the box and gets away in the car before Philippe can catch her. Irma jumps off the car near the Pyramid Hotel, and calls Venomous to meet her there, but Philippe has also arranged to meet Mazamette there. Philippe spots Irma at the Pyramid Hotel, captures her and ties her up. Philippe and Mazamette leave Irma in Mazamette's car and attempt to ambush Venomous, but Irma honks the car horn to warn him. Venomous saves Irma and drives off in Mazamette's car, so Philippe and Mazamette chase him in his. Venomous leaps off; Philippe chases Venomous on foot, following him onto the top of a moving train, but Venomous gets away. Mazamette, enraged at the police for not letting him help Philippe on the train, hits one of the officers, who arrest him. At the police station, Philippe and Mazamette carry on so dramatically that the police decide not to book Mazamette, who is after all a famous philanthropist. But the Vampires are still on the loose.

=== Episode 10 – "The Terrible Wedding" ===
Episode 10 : The Terrible Wedding (1916)

A few months have passed, and Philippe and Jane are now married. Augustine Charlet, widow of the poisoned concierge, is hired by the Guérandes to be their chamber maid. Augustine, still tormented by the mysterious poisoning death of her husband, receives an advertising circular for a psychic, Madame d’Alba of 13 Avenue Junot, and decides to consult her. Madame d’Alba, a Vampire, hypnotises Augustine and instructs her to unlock the door of Philippe's apartment at 2 am. Mazamette, who is attracted to Augustine, wakes that night and sees her descend the stairs to unlock the door. The Vampires enter, tie her up, and pipe poisonous gas into the Guérandes’ room. Mazamette shoots at them and they flee, and Augustine explains her actions. As they go to the police, Venomous tries to break in through a bedroom window, but Jane shoots at him. When she looks out the window she is lassoed down and carried away. At daybreak, the police raid Avenue Junot; however Irma and Venomous escape through the roof and a bomb is left behind. Augustine is recaptured by the Vampires during their escape. Mazamette shoots at the getaway car, causing an oil leak. Philippe follows the trail to the Vampires’ lair and discovers Augustine and Jane, to whom he passes a gun before leaving. Returning at night, he sets up an escape during the celebration of Irma Vep's marriage to Venomous. At daybreak, the police prepare for a massive raid as the party continues. The police burst in and a running gun battle ensues, ending when the remaining Vampires (except Irma) are driven out onto the balcony which Philippe earlier rigged, and are killed in a fall. Irma prepares to kill Jane and Augustine, but Jane shoots her dead. A few days later Mazamette makes a proposal of marriage to Augustine, which she accepts. The story ends with the two couples (Philippe and Jane, and Mazamette and Augustine) standing side by side.

== Cast ==
Newspaper

- Édouard Mathé as Philippe Guérande, a newspaper reporter, investigating the Vampires
- Stacia Napierkowska as Marfa Koutiloff, a dancer and early love interest for Philippe
- Delphine Renot as Madame Guérande, Philippe's mother
- Louise Lagrange as Jane Bremontier, Philippe's fiancée, and later, wife
- Jeanne Marie-Laurent as Madame Brémontier, Jane's mother
- Marcel Lévesque as Oscar-Cloud Mazamette, Guérande's friend and coworker, who is initially working undercover for the Vampires
- Gaston Michel as Benjamin, Mazamette's servant
- René Poyen as Eustache, Mazamette's son
- Germaine Rouer as Augustine Charlet, widow of a Vampire victim and eventual fiancée of Mazamette

Vampires

- Jean Aymé as the First Grand Vampire, a master of disguise
- Musidora as Irma Vep, collaborator with several Vampire leaders
- Suzanne Le Bret as Hortense, Irma Vep's servant
- Louis Leubas as Father Silence, a deaf mute working for the Vampires; and as Satanas, the Second Grand Vampire
- Edmond Bréon as Satanas's servant
- Maurice Boyer aka Moriss as Venomous, the Third Grand Vampire, a chemist genius
- Miss Édith as Countess de Kerlor, a Vampire
- Georgette Faraboni as the Vampire Dancer

Rivals

- Fernand Herrmann as Juan-José Moréno (and Brichonnet), head of a ring of crooks, and rival to the Vampires
- Suzanne Delvé as Lily Flower (in the French intertitles as Fleur-de-Lys), an accomplice of Moréno

Others

- Rita Herlor as Mrs. Simpson, an American multimillionairess
- Émile Keppens as George Baldwin, an American millionaire
- Renée Carl as the Andalusian
- Maurice Luguet as De Villemant
- Paula Maxa as Laure
- Laurent Morléas as Grand Army Officer
- Théodore Thalès as the Magistrate
- Jacques Feyder as a party guest
- Françoise Rosay as a party guest
- Fridolin
- Jean-François Martial

== Production ==
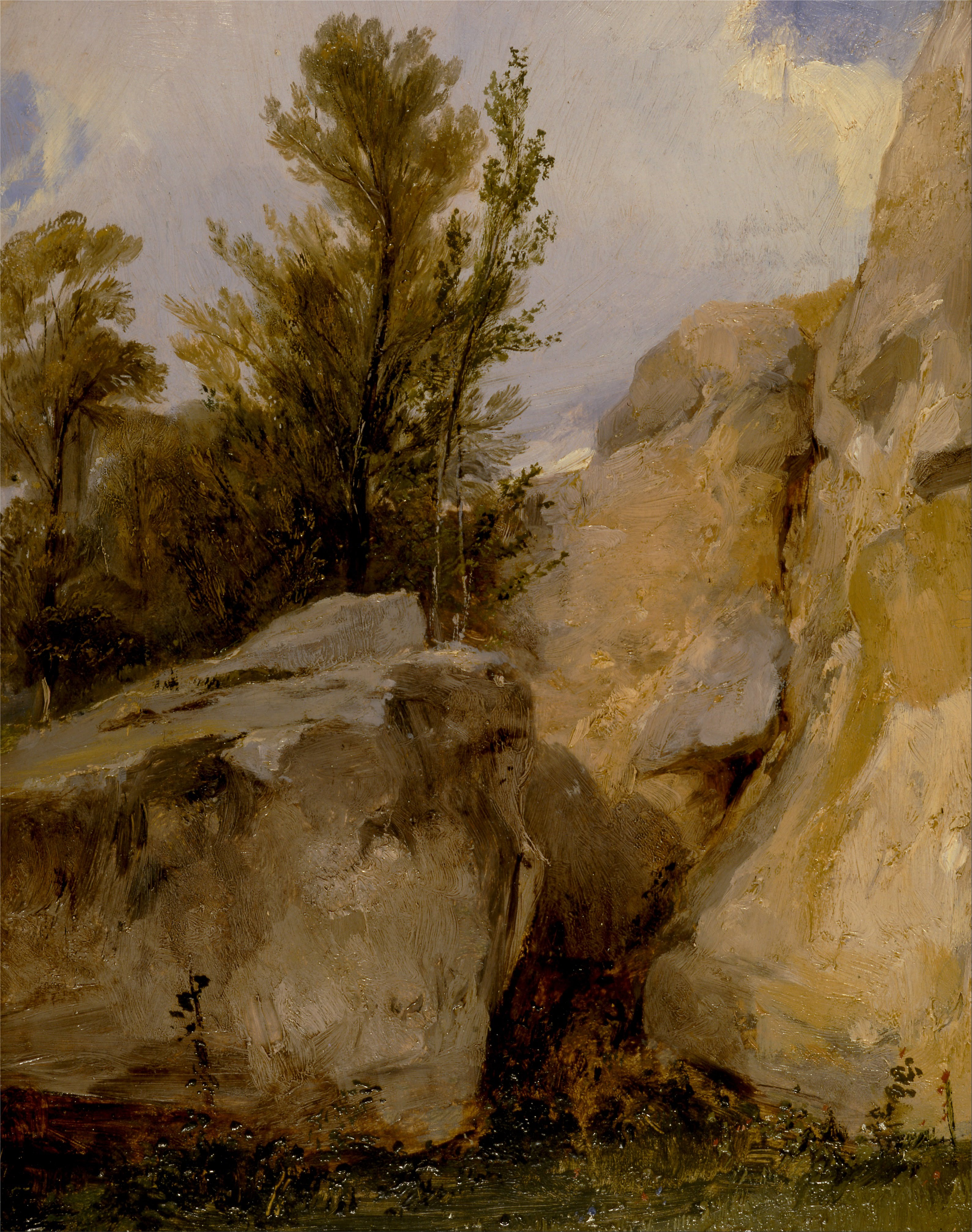
The Forest of Fontainebleau was chosen as a filming location.

=== Development and writing ===
The genre of crime serial was common at the time, and Feuillade had had a big success with his previous work, the serial Fantômas. It is suspected that production of Les Vampires began when Gaumont learned that rival company Pathé had acquired the rights to release the serial The Mysteries of New York, known in America as The Exploits of Elaine, and felt they had to fend off competition.

The idea of the criminal gang was possibly inspired by the Bonnot Gang, a highly advanced anarchist group who went on a high-profile crime spree in Paris during 1911–1912. Feuillade wrote the script himself, but did it in a very simplistic way, usually writing the premise and relying on the actors to fill in the details. Later episodes were more scripted.

The style has been compared to that of a pulp magazine (which it was later serialised as). In an essay on the serial, Fabrice Zagury stated that "...Feuillade's narrative seldom originates from principles of cause and effect... Rather it unwinds following labyrinthine and spiral-shaped paths." None of the episodes employ the cliffhanger mechanic, popularised by The Perils of Pauline.

=== Filming and editing ===
The series was mostly shot on location in Paris, and is said to have been strenuous. Some actors had to leave due to the wartime efforts. It was shot inexpensively, evidenced by the utilisation of painted flats for doors, re-use of furniture in the sets, and its reliance on stock footage for more elaborate shots such as a ferry exploding in "The Thunder Master". The episodes were also produced very quickly; estimates have been made that there would have been a three- to four-month period between the filming of an episode and the release.

Feuillade makes little use of popular cinematic techniques, with most of the cinematography consisting of long takes with stationary cameras with the occasional use of a close up to show plot details such as photos or letters. This was done to give the series a more "real look". Due to a lack of scripting by Feuillade many of the scenes were improvised on the days of shooting. Musidora, a former acrobat, did all her own stunts. Work on the series was done at the same time as of his later serial Judex.

The serial employs tinting to describe the lighting: amber for daylight interiors, green for daylight exteriors, blue for night and dark scenes, and lavender for low-lit areas (such as nightclubs or dawn).

== Release ==
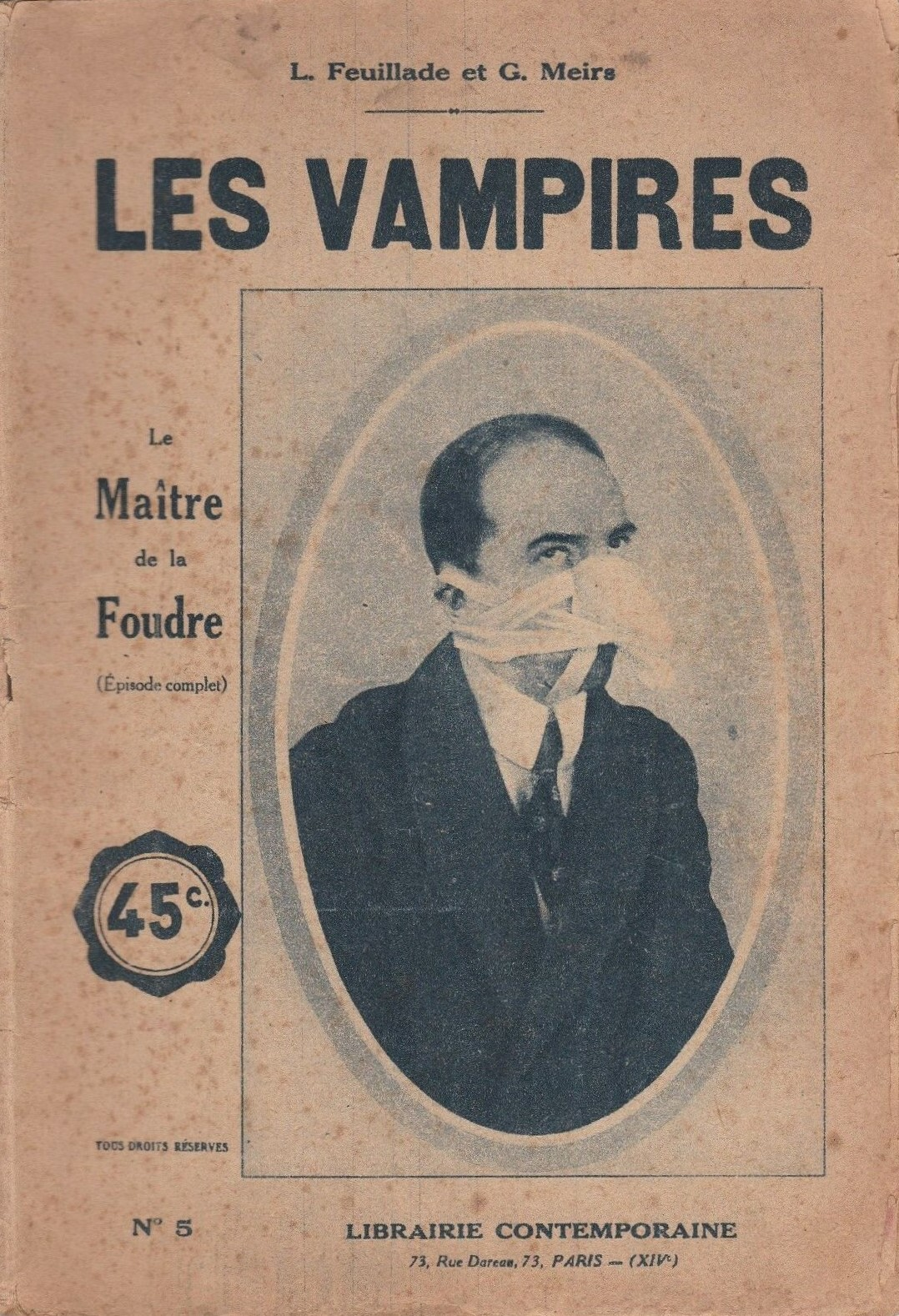
The frontispiece of the novelization of the episode "The Thunder Master", depicting Oscar-Cloud Mazamette with a broken nose

Les Vampires was serialised in French cinemas as ten episodes of differing length, the first two appearing on 13 November 1915 and the last on 30 June 1916. The serial was first shown in Mexico on 24 May 1917 and had an American release at approximately the same time. The rediscovered serial made its début in the US at the 1965 New York Film Festival.

Despite World War I limiting the audience (unlike Feuillade's earlier work Fantômas), it was a huge success in France, massively outshining the original competition from Pathé and the serial The Mysteries of New York. Much of the serial's success is said to have been from the inclusion of Musidora as the antagonist Irma Vep, who fitted well with the archetypes of "vamp" and "femme fatale", often being compared to Theda Bara. The police force, however, condemned the series for its apparent glorification of crime and dubious morality. Some of the episodes were temporarily banned, but these bans were retracted after a personal appeal from Musidora.

A seven-volume novelisation of Les Vampires by Feuillade and George Meirs was published in 1916 by Tallandier (as four paperbacks followed by three magazine-size issues).

=== Promotion ===
Early advertising for Les Vampires was done mysteriously; in November 1915, the walls of Paris were plastered with street posters that depicted three masked faces with a question mark as a noose, and the questions "Qui? Quoi? Quand? Où…?" ("Who? What? When? Where…?") to advertise the first two episodes (released on the same day). Subsequent posters were made for the later episodes. The morning newspapers printed the following poem:

Des nuits sans lune ils sont les Rois, les ténèbres sont leur empire. Portant la mort, semant l'effroi. Voici le vol noir des Vampires. Gorgés de sang, visqueux et lourds. Ils vont, les sinistres Vampires aux grandes ailes de velours non pas vers le Mal... Vers le Pire!

English Translation:

They are the kings of moonless nights, darkness is their kingdom. Carrying death and sowing terror. Here is the black flight of the Vampires. Gorged on blood, viscous and fat. They go, those evil Vampires on great suede wings not towards the bad... towards the worst!

=== Aftermath ===
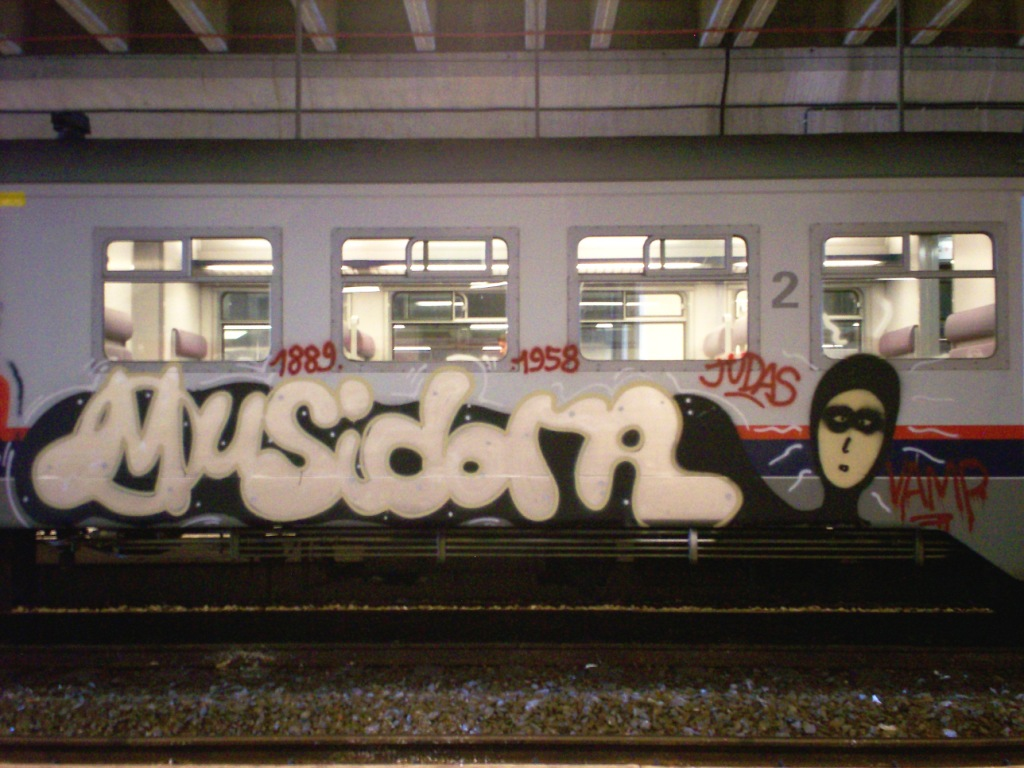
A modern tribute to Musidora and Les Vampires on a Belgian SNCB train by a street artist.

Musidora saw a noticeable raise in her public profile after the serial's release, becoming a star of French cinema. She was able to concentrate her career on directing and writing her own films. Édouard Mathé and Marcel Lévesque enjoyed lengthy film careers as a result of their performances. The three leads, as well as many other cast members, were re-cast by Feuillade to appear in his other serials such as Judex, Tih Minh, Barrabas and Parisette.

== Critical reception ==
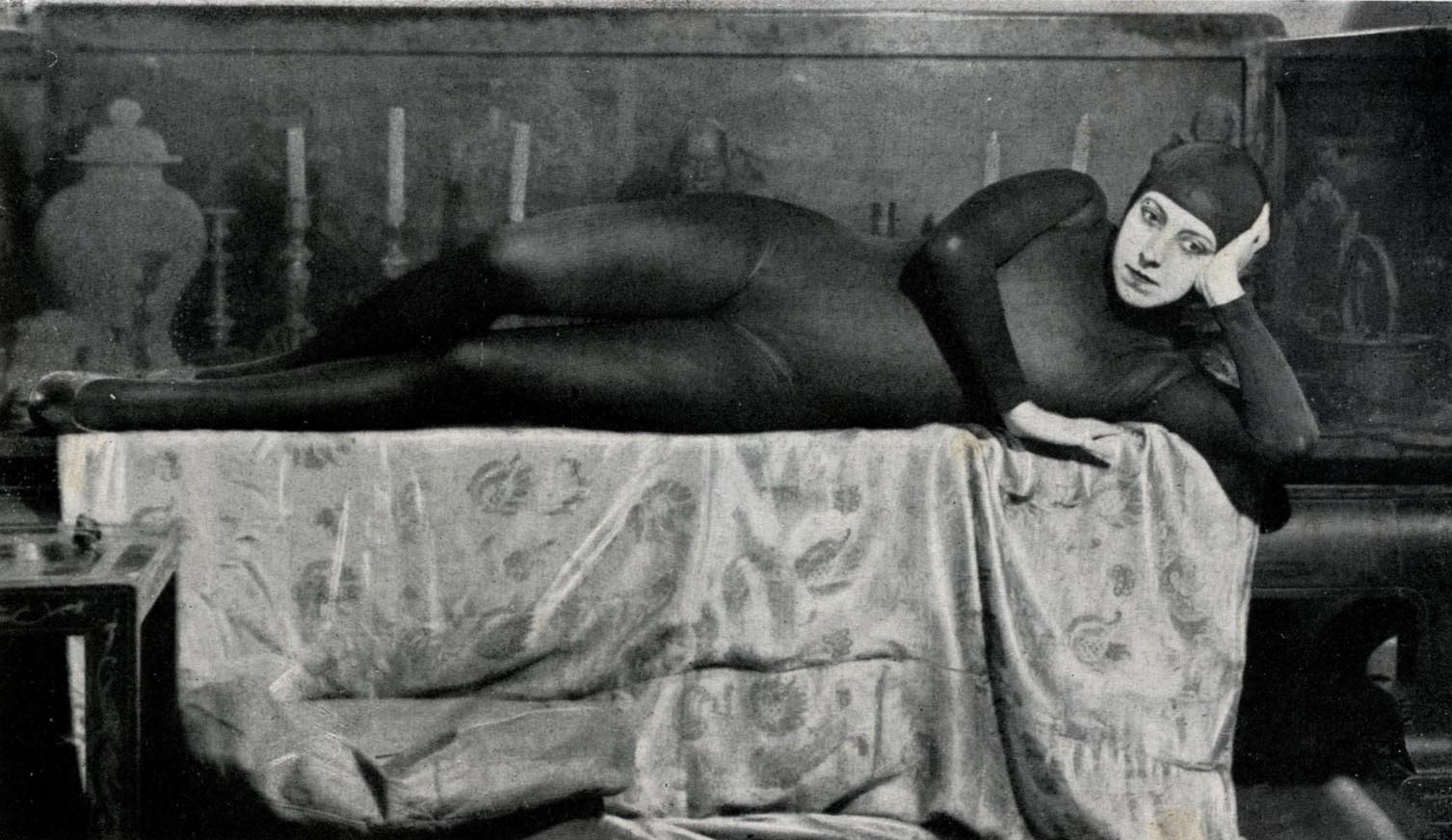
Musidora in a publicity still for Les Vampires, wearing her iconic black bodysuit. Her performance as Irma Vep has been singled out for praise by critics.

=== Contemporary ===
Les Vampires, like other Feuillade crime serials, was generally despised by critics of the time. A reviewer for the magazine Hebdo-Film said: "That a man of talent, an artist, as the director of most of the great films which have been the success and glory of Gaumont, starts again to deal with this unhealthy genre [the crime film], obsolete and condemned by all people of taste, remains for me a real problem." Les Vampires was criticised for being "old-fashioned and inartistic", lacking the artistry of films such as The Birth of a Nation by D. W. Griffith, also first released in 1915. Feuillade, conscious of his film's lack of appeal to critics, once said "A film is not a sermon nor a conference, even less a rebus, but a means to entertain the eyes and the spirit."

=== Re-evaluation ===
Since its original release, some critics, among them Richard Abel, Noël Burch, Francis Lacassin, Annette Michelson, and Richard Roud, have re-interpreted the series. It is now arguably Feuillade's most famous work, and his most critically revered. Rotten Tomatoes reports 96% among 23 critics. While Mathé and Lévesque as the leads have been called pallid and hammy respectively, many critics have praised Musidora for her performance, being described as acting with "voluptuous vitality".

In 1987, film critic Jonathan Rosenbaum called it "one of the supreme delights of film." In 2003, Slant Magazine gave it four stars, calling it "remarkably attuned to the morality of the time" and "exhilarating". It also commented: "its Machiavellian reflection of a complacent bourgeois order on the brink of collapse makes this realist master-work". In a later review, for the 2012 Blu-ray Disc version, the magazine gave further praise to the serial, commenting on its stripped down, proto-thriller execution, giving it a highly modern nature, as well as its surreal disorder, stating that at times "the film's fidelity to realism seems to halt in mid-somersault, with blood rushing to its brain." Time Out gave the series 5 stars, but did note that "if shown, as it often is, in one great unnatural marathon, it can be sheer torture."

Glenn Erickson of DVD Savant gave a highly positive review, highlighting its graphic approach to sensuality and violence. Jamie S. Rich of DVD Talk also gave a positive review, summarising that "Les Vampires is a real treat. It's pulp fiction brought to life on a cinema screen, [with] over six hours of colorful criminals, wooden do-gooders, and outrageous acts of malice and evil." He also added that the length of the series and out-dated aesthetics are its downfall.

Josh Hurtado of Twitch Film called it a "six and a half hour joyride of thrilling cinema". Sean Axmaker, writing for Turner Classic Movies called it "a strange and wonderful masterpiece of elegant beauty and cinematic surprises." Rianne Hill Soriano of Yahoo! Movies said that "for its historical and cinematic contexts as one of the most instrumental works in the evolution of filmmaking both as an art form and an industry, Les Vampires is a valuable addition to a cinephile's movie collection."

In 2002, the series came out joint 30th on the Sight and Sound 'Critics' Top Ten Poll' and 78th on The Village Voice's '250 Best Films of the 20th Century' list. In 2010, The Guardian named it the 25th "Greatest Horror Film of All Time". It is included in the books AFI Desk Reference, National Society of Film Critics' 100 Essential Films, 1000 Essential Films, The Village Voice Film Guide and 1001 Movies You Must See Before You Die.

=== Legacy ===
Les Vampires is said to have established the genre of crime thriller, creating cinematic thriller techniques used later by Alfred Hitchcock and Fritz Lang. The use of gadgetry such as cannons and bombs was also adopted by Lang in films such as Dr. Mabuse the Gambler and The Spiders. It is also said to have inspired experimental filmmakers such as Luis Buñuel and French New Wave directors such as Alain Resnais and Georges Franju. Some have called it an early example of a gangster film.

Les Vampires was adapted to Chinese cinema in the film Beautiful Skeleton, which also blends aspects of the wuxia genre.

Olivier Assayas' 1996 movie Irma Vep, with a story line of a director's attempt to remake Les Vampires, is both an homage to the innovative nature of the original film and a critique of the then current state of French cinema. In 2022, this was remade as an American miniseries by Assayas himself. The play The Mystery of Irma Vep is also inspired by the series, as is the Brazilian adaptation Irma Vep – She's Back!

Les Vampires is referenced in the 1974 French film Celine and Julie Go Boating, where the title characters dress in costumes resembling Irma Vep's black bodysuit, and the 2009 war film Inglourious Basterds, where advertising posters can be seen in an office. The début self-titled album by American punk group Black Lips features an image of Irma Vep as the album cover. French electronic music duo Château Flight released a soundtrack to the film in 2006.

In Kim Newman's Moriarty: The Hound of the D'Urbervilles story collection, Professor Moriarty is portrayed as dealing with Les Vampires several times. He provides them with a skull purported to be that of Napoleon Bonaparte, intended for use as a drinking vessel.

=== Home media ===
In May 2000, the serial was released on DVD in the US by Image Entertainment on two discs, with music by Robert Israel. Additional features to this version are the short films For the Children (a wartime fundraiser starring the cast of Les Vampires) and Bout de Zan and the Shirker (a comedy featuring René Poyen), as well as a supplementary essay on the film "The Public Is My Master" by Fabrice Zagury. Gaumont released a special French restored edition in March 2006. Containing four discs, it includes a documentary on Feuillade titled Louis Feuillade at Work, a featurette on the serial's restoration and a 32-page booklet. In March 2008 Artificial Eye released a three disc UK edition, which includes five short films and a new musical accompaniment by Éric le Guen.

In August 2012 a Blu-ray version was released by Kino International on two discs, remastered from the Cinémathèque Française 35mm film restoration, with a musical score by the Mont Alto Motion Picture Orchestra and a trailer for Fantômas. On October 2017, a six disc French Blu-ray edition, which inlcuided Fantômas and 2 DVDs with bonus features, was released by Gaumont. A limited edition Blu-ray box set, which also included Fantômas, Judex and Tih Minh all restored on 4K, was released by Eureka Entertainment through its Masters of Cinema series in September 2024.

== See also ==
- Fantômas
- Judex
- Apache
- List of film serials
- List of film serials by studio
- List of films in the public domain in the United States
