= Sean Carlson (music promoter) =

American music promoter

Sean Carlson (born June 13, 1985) is an American music promoter from Torrance, California. He is the founder of FYF Fest and the "F Yeah Fest" music tour. The first Fuck Yeah Fest was held in 2004 at the Echo, a club in Echo Park, Los Angeles, California.

As of 2009, the festival officially changed its name to "FYF Fest" after moving the festival from the Echoplex to the L.A. Historic State Park.

In 2017, multiple women came forward to accuse Carlson of sexual harassment and assault. Spin magazine reported that Carlson's sexual misconduct was considered an "open secret" within the Los Angeles music scene. As a result of the allegations, his relationship with Goldenvoice (the parent company of FYF Fest) was terminated.
