= Almighty Defenders =

Canadian-American one-off supergroup (2009)

- Origin: Berlin, Germany
- Genres: Doo-wop, garage rock
- Years active: 2009–2010
- Label: Vice Records

The Almighty Defenders was an impromptu supergroup consisting of the bands Black Lips from Atlanta, US and The King Khan & BBQ Show who originated from Montreal, Canada but were based in Berlin, Germany at the time.

The band was formed after Black Lips had fled India during their 2009 tour after suspicions of their arrest following acts of public indecency during a live show. The Almighty Defenders recorded a self-titled homemade album over the course of a week while spending time together in February 2009 in Berlin, with the album eventually releasing on September 22, 2009 on Vice Records.

The band performed at Primavera Sound festival in Barcelona, Spain in May 2010.

== Discography ==
- The Almighty Defenders (2009)
1. All My Loving - 3:08
2. The Ghost With The Most - 4:05
3. Bow Down And Die - 4:07
4. Cone Of Light - 3:22
5. Jihad Blues - 2:01
6. 30 Second Air Blast - 1:42
7. Death Cult Soup n' Salad - 1:20
8. I'm Coming Home - 3:12
9. Over The Horizon - 1:46
10. She Came Before Me - 3:26
11. The Great Defender - 4:58
