= Good Bad Not Evil =

Studio album by Black Lips
- Released: September 11, 2007
- Genre: Rock and roll; garage rock
- Length: 35:28
- Label: Vice; In the Red
- Producer: The Black Lips

Black Lips chronology
Los Valientes del Mundo Nuevo (2007)	Good Bad Not Evil (2007)	200 Million Thousand (2008)

Singles from Good Bad Not Evil
- 1. "Cold Hands" Released: 2007; 2. "O Katrina!" Released: 2007; 3. "Veni Vidi Vici" Released: 2007

Good Bad Not Evil is the fourth studio album by garage rock band Black Lips. The album was recorded in December 2006 and released on September 11, 2007. The title is a reference to The Shangri-Las song, "Give Him a Great Big Kiss".. Their song "Veni Vidi Vici" samples the song "I'm Going Home" by The Swamp Rats.

== Reception ==
Professional ratings
Review scores
Source	Rating
AllMusic	4/5 stars
The A.V. Club	B+
BBC Collective	3.5/5 stars
Drowned in Sound	7/10
Entertainment Weekly	A−
The Guardian	3/5 stars
NME	8/10
Pitchfork	8.3/10
Stylus	B
Tiny Mix Tapes	4/5 stars

Good Bad Not Evil has received generally positive reviews. On the review aggregate site Metacritic the album has a score of 73 out of 100, indicating "generally favorable reviews".

== Licensing ==
Several songs from Good Bad Not Evil have appeared in films. "Bad Kids" and "Veni Vidi Vici" were featured in (500) Days of Summer. "Veni Vidi Vici" was also featured in Angel Camouflaged, while "O Katrina!" was featured in Scott Pilgrim vs. the World.

== Track listing ==
No.	Title	Length
1.	"I Saw a Ghost (Lean)"	2:53
2.	"O Katrina!"	2:52
3.	"Veni Vidi Vici"	2:28
4.	"It Feels Alright"	2:49
5.	"Navajo"	2:41
6.	"Lock and Key"	2:44
7.	"How Do You Tell a Child That Someone Has Died"	2:30
8.	"Bad Kids"	2:08
9.	"Step Right Up"	2:11
10.	"Cold Hands"	2:26
11.	"Off the Block"	1:40
12.	"Slime and Oxygen"	2:42
13.	"Transcendental Light (+Hidden Track)"	6:03

iTunes Bonus Track
No.	Title	Length
14.	"Daddy Longlegs"	2:39

eMusic Bonus Track
No.	Title	Length
15.	"My Struggle"	2:36

== Personnel ==
The following people contributed to Good Bad Not Evil:

=== Black Lips ===
- Cole Alexander
- Joe Bradley
- Ian St. Pe
- Jared "Hondo" Swilley

=== Additional personnel ===
- Jiro Bevis - Illustrations
- Black Lips - Audio Production
- Justin McNeight - Audio Engineer
- Dan Monick - Photography
- Edward Rawls - Audio Engineer, Engineer
- Noel Summerville - Mastering
- Chris "Box" Taylor - Artwork, Design

== Charts ==
Chart (2007)	Peak position
US Top Heatseekers	18
