= We Did Not Know the Forest Spirit Made the Flowers Grow =

Studio album by Black Lips
- Released: May 18, 2004
- Genre: Garage rock, lo-fi
- Length: 28:55
- Label: Bomp!

Black Lips chronology
Black Lips! (2003)	We Did Not Know the Forest Spirit Made the Flowers Grow (2004)	Let It Bloom (2005)

Professional ratings
Review scores
Source	Rating
AllMusic	3.5/5 stars

We Did Not Know the Forest Spirit Made the Flowers Grow is the Black Lips' second LP album, released in 2004. The name is a reference to a line from the Hayao Miyazaki film Princess Mononoke.

"Notown Blues" features Bradford Cox of Deerhunter on drums. Notown was the name of a studio and rehearsal space in Marietta, Georgia. Original Black Lips guitarist Ben Eberbaugh, who died in a car accident in 2002, played on "Juvenile."

== Track listing ==
1. "M.I.A." - 2:24
2. "Time of the Scab" - 2:17
3. "Dawn of the Age of Tomorrow" - 1:47
4. "Nothing At All/100 New Fears" - 3:17
5. "Stranger" - 2:15
6. "Juvenile" - 1:50
7. "Notown Blues" - 2:57
8. "Ghetto Cross" - 2:14
9. "Jumpin Around" - 1:26
10. "Super X-13" - 9:10
11. "Hope Jazz" (Bonus track)
