= Arabia Mountain (album) =

Studio album by Black Lips
- Released: June 7, 2011
- Genre: Garage rock, garage punk
- Length: 41:15
- Label: Vice
- Producer: Mark Ronson, Lockett Pundt, Black Lips

Black Lips chronology
200 Million Thousand (2009)	Arabia Mountain (2011)	Underneath the Rainbow (2014)

Singles from Arabia Mountain
- 1. "Go Out and Get It" Released: March 3, 2011; 2. "Modern Art" Released: April 6, 2011; 3. "New Direction" Released: May 16, 2011

Arabia Mountain is the sixth studio album by American garage punk band Black Lips, released on June 7, 2011. The album was written and recorded over a nine months stretch from March 2010 to January 2011. Lockett Pundt produced "Bicentennial Man" and "Go Out and Get It", while Mark Ronson was responsible for producing the rest. The production by Ronson was conducted first in a Brooklyn studios, but completed in Black Lips' hometown of Atlanta due to time constraints. The music video for the first single, "Go Out and Get It", was released on March 2. The music video for the second single, "Modern Art", was released on April 5. "New Direction" was leaked to the public by Rolling Stone on May 16. The music video for "Raw Meat" was chosen by Pitchfork in The Top Music Videos of 2011.

== Critical reception ==
Professional ratings
Aggregate scores
Source	Rating
AnyDecentMusic?	7.6/10
Metacritic	80/100
Review scores
Source	Rating
AllMusic	4/5 stars
The Guardian	3/5 stars
Pitchfork	7.7/10
PopMatters	9/10
NME	8/10
Spin	7/10
Slant Magazine	4/5 stars
The A.V. Club	(B)

Arabia Mountain was met with "generally favorable" reviews from critics. At Metacritic, which assigns a weighted average rating out of 100 to reviews from mainstream publications, this release received an average score of 80 based on 25 reviews. At AnyDecentMusic?, the release was given a 7.7 out of 10 based on a critical consensus of 24 reviews

== Licensing ==
"New Direction" was featured on the AMC television channel. "The Lie" is featured on the soundtrack for Need for Speed: The Run.

== Track listing ==
No.	Title	Writer(s)	Length
1.	"Family Tree"	Alexander	2:36
2.	"Modern Art"	Swilley	2:04
3.	"Spidey's Curse"	Alexander	2:49
4.	"Mad Dog"	Swilley	2:02
5.	"Mr. Driver"	Alexander	2:49
6.	"Bicentennial Man"	Bradley	2:19
7.	"Go Out and Get It"	Bradley	1:55
8.	"Raw Meat"	Alexander	1:48
9.	"Bone Marrow"	Swilley	2:52
10.	"The Lie"	Bradley	3:13
11.	"Time"	St. Pe	2:46
12.	"Dumpster Dive"	Alexander	2:23
13.	"New Direction"	Swilley	2:29
14.	"Noc-a-Homa"	Swilley	2:00
15.	"Don't Mess Up My Baby"	Alexander	2:45
16.	"You Keep On Running"	Alexander	4:25
17.	"Kiss It Goodbye" ([iTunes Bonus Track])		3:38

== Charts ==
Chart performance for Arabia Mountain
Chart (2011)	Peak position
US Billboard 200	122
US Independent Albums (Billboard)	22
US Heatseekers Albums (Billboard)	1
US Top Rock Albums (Billboard)	44
US Vinyl Albums (Billboard)	3

== Personnel ==
Black Lips

- Cole Alexander – guitar, vocals, skull
- Jared Swilley – bass, vocals
- Ian St. Pé – guitar, vocals
- Joe Bradley – drums, vocals

Additional personnel

- Mark Ronson – production
- Lockett Pundt – production
- Wayne Gordon – Audio engineer
- Mike Wright – Audio engineer on "Noc-A-Homa"
- Mike McHugh – Audio engineer on "Time," "Dumpster Dive," "Family Tree," "Bicentennial Man," "Go Out and Get It," "You Keep On Running"
- Ed Rawls – Audio engineer on "Family Tree," "Bicentennial Man," "Go Out and Get It," "You Keep On Running"
- Justin McNeight – Audio engineer on "Family Tree," "Bicentennial Man," "Go Out and Get It," "You Keep On Running"
- Ira Raibon – Saxophone on "Family Tree"
- Dale Stuckenbruck – Musical Saw on "Raw Meat," "Modern Art," and "Bone Marrow"
- Cochemea Gastelum – Saxophone on "Mad Dog"
