= Let It Bloom =

Studio album by Black Lips
- Released: November 22, 2005
- Genre: Garage rock, lo-fi
- Length: 40:39
- Label: In the Red

Black Lips chronology
We Did Not Know the Forest Spirit Made the Flowers Grow (2004)	Let It Bloom (2005)	Los Valientes del Mundo Nuevo (2007)

Professional ratings
Review scores
Source	Rating
AllMusic	4/5 stars
Drowned in Sound	6/10
Prefix Magazine	7/10
Music Emissions	4/5 stars
Uncut	4/5 stars

Let It Bloom is the Black Lips' third LP album, released in 2005.

== Track listing ==
1. "Sea of Blasphemy" - 1:35
2. "Can't Dance" - 1:52
3. "Boomerang" - 2:05
4. "Hippie, Hippie, Hoorah" (Jacques Dutronc cover) - 3:31
5. "Not a Problem" - 3:01
6. "Gung Ho" - 1:48
7. "Everybody's Doin' It" - 2:41
8. "Feeling Gay" - 3:47
9. "Take Me Home (Back to Boone)" - 2:26
10. "Gentle Violence" - 2:11
11. "She's Gone" - 1:43
12. "Fairy Stories" - 1:51
13. "Dirty Hands" - 2:05
14. "Workin'" - 2:11
15. "Punk Slime" - 4:21
16. "Empassant" - 2:53
