= 200 Million Thousand =

Studio album by Black Lips
- Released: February 24, 2009
- Recorded: August 2008
- Genres: Garage punk, psychedelic rock
- Length: 51:47
- Label: Vice

Black Lips chronology
Good Bad Not Evil (2007)	200 Million Thousand (2009)	Arabia Mountain (2011)

Professional ratings
Aggregate scores
Source	Rating
Metacritic	75/100
Review scores
Source	Rating
Allmusic	3.5/5 stars
Artrocker	4/5 stars
Daily Dischord	3/5 stars
The Guardian	4/5 stars
NME	(7/10)
Pitchfork Media	(7.3/10)
PopMatters	(7/10)
Rolling Stone	3/5 stars
The Skinny	3/5 stars
Spin	4/5 stars

200 Million Thousand is the fifth studio album by garage punk band Black Lips. The album was recorded in August 2008 and released on February 24, 2009, in the United States and March 16 in Europe. The first single, "Short Fuse" was released on March 9, 2009.

== Critical reception ==
200 Million Thousand was met with "generally favorable" reviews from critics. At Metacritic, which assigns a weighted average rating out of 100 to reviews from mainstream publications, this release received an average score of 75, based on 25 reviews.

== Track listing ==
No.	Title	Length
1.	"Take My Heart"	2:45
2.	"Drugs"	2:31
3.	"Starting Over"	3:57
4.	"Let It Grow"	3:35
5.	"Trapped in a Basement"	2:32
6.	"Short Fuse"	3:24
7.	"I'll Be With You"	2:30
8.	"Big Black Baby Jesus of Today"	2:54
9.	"Again & Again"	2:46
10.	"Old Man"	2:50
11.	"The Drop I Hold"	3:14
12.	"Body Combat"
13.	Untitled	3:22
14.	"Elijah"	2:50
15.	"I Saw God"	7:41
16.	"Meltdown (Hidden Track)"

"Again & Again" is a cover version of an Iggy Pop song, published under his real name (Jim Osterberg), and originally recorded with his first band The Iguanas in 1965.

== Charts ==
Chart performance for 200 Million Thousand
Chart (2009)	Peak position
US Independent Albums (Billboard)	44
