= Eric Gagnon =

Eric Gagnon, who also goes by the name Easy E (born on 1 August 1971 in Houston, TX) is an American bass player, guitarist, and music producer. He has produced for the Black Lips, among others.
