= Die Slaughterhaus Records =

Record company

Die Slaughterhaus Records is a record company based in Atlanta, Georgia, that includes punk rock acts such as Deerhunter, Black Lips, Carbonas, CPC Gangbangs, Frantic, The Coathangers, Die Rotzz, and Hipshakes. Founded in 2001 by Mark Naumann, Die Slaughterhaus began as a venue for punk rock shows, and it quickly became a popular place to see live music in Atlanta.
