= Los Valientes del Mundo Nuevo =

Live album by Black Lips
- Released: February 20, 2007
- Genre: Punk rock, garage rock, lo-fi
- Length: 35:28
- Label: Vice Records

Black Lips chronology
Let It Bloom (2005)	Los Valientes del Mundo Nuevo (2007)	Good Bad Not Evil (2007)

Professional ratings
Review scores
Source	Rating
Allmusic	3.5/5 stars
Rolling Stone	3/5 stars
Pitchfork Media	(7.8/10)
Stylus	B+

Los Valientes del Mundo Nuevo (The Braves of the New World) is the second live album by the lo-fi garage rock band Black Lips. This recording is purportedly from a live show performed in Tijuana, Mexico, but the validity of this claim has frequently been called into question. Many of the songs featured appeared on the band's previous studio album, Let It Bloom.

== Track listing ==
1. "M.I.A." – 3:53
2. "Boomerang" – 2:27
3. "Sea of Blasphemy" – 2:14
4. "Stranger" – 2:33
5. "Not a Problem" – 3:14
6. "Hippie, Hippie, Hoorah" – 2:53
7. "Boone" – 2:07
8. "Everybody's Doing It" – 3:00
9. "Fairy Stories" – 1:52
10. "Dirty Hands" – 2:36
11. "Buried Alive" – 2:24
12. "Juvenile" – 8:14
13. [Hidden Track] "Lion with Wings" – 2:52
