= Black Lips =

American rock band

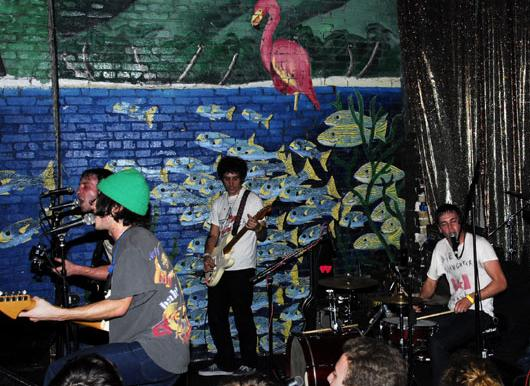
- Black Lips in concert, SXSW 2007

Background information
- Origin: Atlanta, Georgia, US
- Genres: Garage rock; punk rock; psychedelic rock
- Years active: 1999–present
- Labels: Bomp!; In the Red; Vice; Fire
- Members: Cole Alexander; Jared Swilley; Oakley Munson; Zumi Rosow; Jeff Clarke
- Past members: Ben Eberbaugh; Ian Saint Pé; Joe Bradley; Jack Hines; Richie Hayes
- Website: black-lips.com

Black Lips is an American garage rock band from Atlanta, Georgia, formed in 1999. The band has released a total of eleven studio albums, the first of which being 2003's Black Lips!.

== History ==
=== Origins (1999–2003) ===
The band was formed in 1999 in Dunwoody, Georgia, a northern suburb of Atlanta, after guitarist Cole Alexander and bassist Jared Swilley left The Renegades, and guitarist Ben Eberbaugh left The Reruns. Alexander and Swilley were known for their crude antics both during shows and at school. They were kicked out of school during their senior year after the Columbine Massacre in 1999 because they were regarded as a "subculture danger". Drummer Joe Bradley, who had been studying in college after graduating high school early, joined a few months later.

They released their first 7-inch in 2002 with tracks from their first ever studio LP ~ completed in 2000 with producer/guitarist Eric Gagnon of The El Caminos. The 7-inch featured "Ain't Coming Back", "B52 Bomberboy", "Can't Get Me Down" and "Stone Cold" all of which were tracked, mixed and mastered by Gagnon, and was released on their own record label, Die Slaughterhaus Records. Just days before a tour was to begin in December 2002, guitarist Ben Eberbaugh was driving a car when he was struck by a drunk driver and was killed. The band carried on, believing that Eberbaugh would want them to continue.

=== Debut album & further releases (2003–2007) ===
The band's debut full-length album, Black Lips!, was released on Bomp! Records on March 18, 2003. Within this tribute album commemorating Ben Eberbaugh's life as a quality musician, they released three more songs from their set with Gagnon from 2000: "Stone Cold", with Gagnon on bass, "Can't Get Me Down", and "Everybody Loves A Cocksucker" were already mixed and mastered by Gagnon. They had "Stone Cold" remastered with the channels flipped from the original two track mix as a way of avoiding legal trouble. Back in 2000, Swilley had put himself in rehab during the studio session with Gagnon, so Alexander asked Gagnon to play bass both in the studio and during a live show at The EARL in Atlanta. Gagnon agreed so long as he didn't have to record any more firecrackers in his studio ("Ain't Coming Back"). Eberbaugh's bluesy guitar style makes a large presence in their early work.

After his untimely death in 2002, Eberbaugh's role was filled by Jack Hines, a friend of the band members, and they subsequently recorded their second studio album, We Did Not Know the Forest Spirit Made the Flowers Grow, with him. The album released on May 18, 2004. Hines quit the band in 2004 so he could settle down with his wife. Ian Saint Pé, who at the time was enrolled at the University of Memphis as a music major, got a call from the band asking if he wanted to immediately join them on tour. Saint Pé, who spent his early twenties buying alcohol for his then-underage future bandmates, dropped out of school and accepted the band's offer.

In 2005, they released two more 7-inch records through Slovenly Recordings. Gagnon produced both "Stuck In My Mind" and "Does She Want" which were tracked, mixed and mastered by Gagnon back in 2000. The band went on to release their third studio album, Let It Bloom, on November 22, 2005. This would be their only album released via In the Red Records. The band slowly built a fanbase that appreciated their rough pastiche of blues, rock, doo-wop, country, and punk. The band gained national attention in 2006 with features in Spin and Rolling Stone. The band got exposure in The New York Times during the 2007 South by Southwest music festival in Austin, Texas, in which they played a dozen shows over a three-day period.

A performance by Black Lips is featured in Burn to Shine 'Vol 6: Atlanta' (2007), part of a series by Brendan Canty of Fugazi.

=== Vice Records era (2007–2019) ===
The band's debut release for Vice Records was a live album, Los Valientes del Mundo Nuevo, which released on February 20, 2007. It is supposed to have been recorded at a bar in Tijuana, Mexico, but fans, musicians, and journalists have expressed doubts about that claim and speculated that some or most of it was recorded in a studio with John Reis. Responding to such allegations, Swilley has stated that Reis recorded the show live with a soundboard, microphones, and a computer placed strategically near the stage. Saint Pé said that the band had to use the best twelve out of twenty live cuts from the Tijuana show, which he described as "absolutely nuts". On September 11, 2007 their fourth studio album entitled Good Bad Not Evil was released. The band made their American national television debut in October 2007 on Late Night with Conan O'Brien and played "O Katrina". In May 2008, they made their UK TV debut performing "Bad Kids" on BBC Three's The Wall. The Black Lips were to star in the film Let It Be, in which they portrayed musicians in a fictitious 1980s era DIY band called The Renegades. The movie was set for production in the summer of 2008; however, in a September 2008 interview, the band admitted they became disenchanted with the project after viewing the trailer and seeing the way they felt they were going to be portrayed in the movie.

A song called "Arboles De La Barranca" was performed by Black Lips for the 2008 Mexican comedy drama film Rudo y Cursi.

In October 2008 a portion of the band's song "Veni Vidi Vici" was played during the season premiere episode of the television show Dirty Sexy Money, shown on the American network ABC. The same song was going to be used in a commercial by British supermarket chain Tesco, but, according to the band, the company decided not to go through with the deal because of concerns with the lyrical content of the song. The group toured India in January 2009. Following some antics at their show in Chennai, the band became worried about being arrested and imprisoned for "homosexual acts" so they fled the city and eventually the country. The band summed up what happened in an interview at the musical festival: "they kissed, and some weiners were pulled out..." Vice Records documented the trip. After the band left India, they traveled to Berlin, Germany, and recorded a 12-song LP of gospel-influenced songs with Canadian duo, The King Khan & BBQ Show. The album was released on September 22, 2009, under the name Almighty Defenders.

The band released their fifth studio album, 200 Million Thousand, on February 24, 2009, on, with the help of Zach, Meredith, and Austin. The songs were recorded at New Street Studio, a former art gallery in Decatur, Georgia, near Atlanta. The band embarked on a world tour in 2009 to support this album. Over the course of eleven months, they played 122 shows total between Europe and the United States. The band have a featured role in the documentary We Fun: Atlanta, GA Inside Out. The title was coined by Swilley on the band's blog. The film made its debut at the Atlanta Film Festival in April 2009.

The band began working on their sixth studio album, Arabia Mountain, in November 2009. They finished recording the album with producer Mark Ronson in New York City in November 2010. The album eventually released on June 7, 2011.

The band released their seventh studio album, Underneath the Rainbow, on March 17, 2014. The album peaked at #143 on the Billboard 200.

The band's eighth studio album, and their final with Vice Records, Satan's Graffiti or God's Art?, was released on July 7, 2017. The album was produced by Sean Lennon throughout 2016 and features guest contributions from Yoko Ono and Saul Adamczewski of Fat White Family. The album was described by Pitchfork as, "Black Lips’ most sonically elaborate album and its most aggressively primitive".

=== Fire Records era (2019–present) ===
In October 2019, the band announced they had signed to Fire Records. The band released their ninth studio album, Sing... In A World That's Falling Apart, on January 24, 2020 with Fire Records, in partnership with Vice. On the review aggregate site Metacritic, the album has a score of 76 out of 100, indicating "generally favorable reviews", with PopMatters describing the record as a "near perfect offering".

On October 14, 2022, the band released their tenth studio album, Apocalypse Love. The band spend the end of the year on tour in North America.

The band released their eleventh and most recent studio album, Season of the Peach, on September 19, 2025. The band spent late 2025 on tour in Europe and touring with Swedish post-punk band Viagra Boys in North America.

== Live shows ==
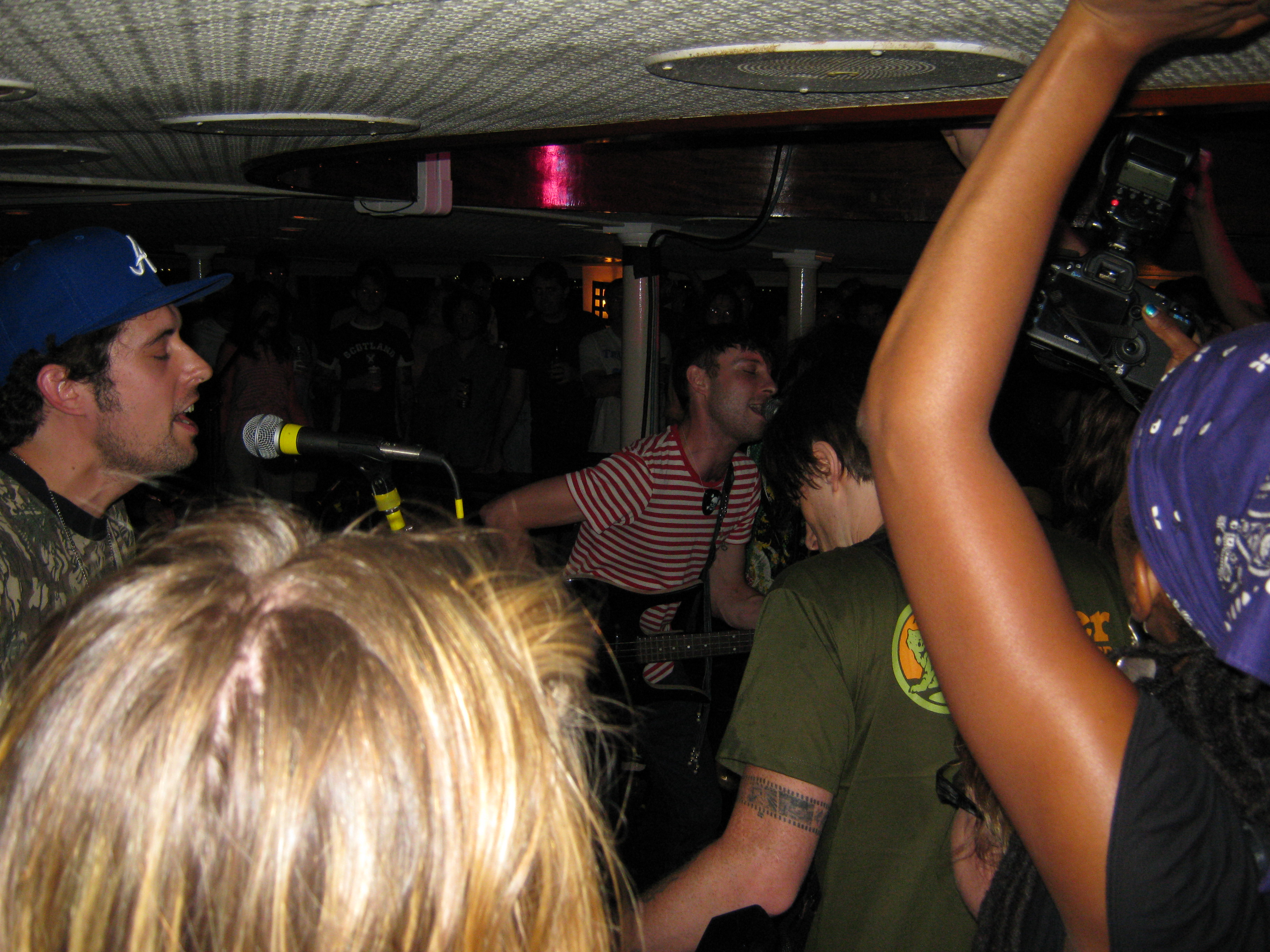
A show aboard The Temptress in New York City

Black Lips are noted for their provocative theatrics during live shows, with acts including vomiting (Alexander's medical condition), urination, nudity, R.C. car races, fireworks, a chicken, flaming guitars and other un-predictable acts. These were inspired both by the "punk-before-punk" Viennese Actionism movement in Austria, and the infamous hardcore punk musician GG Allin according to Alexander. Most of these antics, which are the center of attention in media coverage of the band, occurred in the band's early days, a time when the band had not yet learned how to play their instruments. The frequency of the group's outrageous stage antics has since declined, as they claim to have matured "a little bit". Despite frequent media attention surrounding their antics, Swilley noted, "it doesn't seem all that crazy to me. It’s not like we have ever done a human sacrifice on stage or anything like that".

The band played at Heaven in London, England on September 16, 2008, which ended with a stage invasion, which their most popular live YouTube video. The group had expressed interest in playing venues and countries that typically don't see many rock bands perform. They had previously wanted to perform in Africa, South America, China, and Indonesia, but have not done so.

In 2010, the band toured Australia, New Zealand and Japan. In conjunction with SPINearth.tv, the group documented the behind the scenes footage of their infamous antics.

In September and October 2012, the band performed a long discussed Middle East tour which saw them perform shows in Iraq, Lebanon, Egypt, Jordan and the United Arab Emirates. A short documentary about the tour was released by Noisey in January 2013.

On February 7, 2016, The Black Lips performed live on Adult Swim's FishCenter Live during Super Bowl 50.

== Side projects ==
Ian Saint Pé has a project called Saint Pé. Saint Pé also plays guitar in another band called Diamond Rugs, which features members of Deer Tick, Dead Confederate, Los Lobos, and Six Finger Satellite. Diamond Rugs released their self-titled debut album, on Partisan Records in 2012. The band's second and most recent album, Cosmetics, was released in 2015.

Jared Swilley provides guitar and vocals for The Gaye Blades, who have released two 7-inches on Rob's House Records and an LP on Norton Records. In late summer 2008, band member Bobby Ubangi was diagnosed with small cell lung and brain cancer. He died in summer 2009 and is referred to in the Black Lips songs "Dirty Hands" and "I'll Be With You".

Under the name Old King Cole Younger, Cole Alexander released a split single on Rob's House Records with Bradford Cox of Deerhunter, performing under the alias Atlas Sound. Cole Alexander and Bradford Cox also have a project called Ghetto Cross.

Joe Bradley produced a rap group called Incoqnekro. They recorded an album titled Incoqnekronomicon, which was released on June 6, 2006.

Alexander, Swilley, and Bradley perform as ghost-rock band The Spooks. Bradford Cox of Deerhunter and Deerhunter collaborator Adam Bruneau are among the Atlanta musicians to have also played in The Spooks. The band formed in 2002 to play Halloween shows. The band members wear white sheets on stage, and performances have included blood, animal parts and a chainsaw. They began recording songs for an album in 2004, and their only LP, Death From Beyond The Grave, was released by Die Slaughterhaus Records in January 2009.

In 2011, Alexander and Curtis Harding worked together on a 'Garage / Soul' project called Night Sun, releasing a single titled, "No Pressure / On My Way" in 2014 on Burger Records.

More recently, Alexander and Rosow have performed as the Los Angeles-based duo Crush.

== Personnel ==
Current members

- Cole Alexander (born June 8, 1982) – vocals, guitar (1999–present)
- Jared Swilley (born August 8, 1983) – vocals, bass guitar (1999–present)
- Oakley Munson – drums, vocals (2017–present)
- Zumi Rosow – vocals, saxophone (2013–present)
- Jeff Clarke – guitar, vocals (2018–present)

Former members

- Ben Eberbaugh (January 29, 1980 – December 1, 2002) – guitar, vocals (1999–2002)
- Jack Hines – guitar, vocals (2002–2004, 2014–2017)
- Ian Saint Pé – guitar (2004–2014, late 2017)
- Joe Bradley (born February 3, 1984) – vocals, drums (1999–2017)

Timeline

== Discography ==
=== Studio albums ===
- Black Lips! - 2003 (BOMP! Records)
- We Did Not Know the Forest Spirit Made the Flowers Grow - 2004 (BOMP! Records)
- Let It Bloom - 2005 (In the Red Records)
- Good Bad Not Evil - 2007 (Vice Records)
- 200 Million Thousand - 2009 (Vice Records)
- Arabia Mountain - 2011 (Vice Records)
- Underneath the Rainbow - 2014 (Vice Records) Billboard 200 # 143
- Satan's Graffiti or God's Art? - 2017 (Vice Records)
- Sing... in a World That's Falling Apart - 2020 (Fire Records/Vice Records)
- Apocalypse Love - 2022 (Fire Records)
- Season of the Peach - 2025 (Fire Records)

=== Live albums ===
- Live @ WFMU - 2005 (Dusty Medical Records)
- Los Valientes del Mundo Nuevo - 2007 (Vice Records)
- Live at Third Man Records - 2012 (Third Man Records)

=== Singles ===
- "Ain't Comin' Back" - 2002 (Die Slaughterhaus Records)
- "Freakout" - 2002 (The Electric Human Project)
- "Ain't Comin' Back" - 2003 (Munster Records)
- "Live at the Jam Club" - 2004 (Shake Your Ass Records)
- "Does She Want" - 2005 (Slovenly Recordings)
- "In and Out" - 2005 (Slovenly Recordings)
- "Born to Be a Man" - 2005 (Varmint Records)
- "Party at Rob's House" - 2006 (Rob's House Records)
- "Born to Be a Man" - 2006 (Re-release with different cover) (Bachelor Records)
- "Not a Problem" - 2007 (Vice Records)
- "Cold Hands" - 2007 (Vice Records)
- "O Katrina!" - 2007 (Vice Records)
- "Veni Vidi Vici" - 2007 (Vice Records)
- "O Katrina! Australian Tour" - 2007 (Juvenile Records)
- "Bad Kids / Leroy Faster" - 2008 (Vice Records)
- "Short Fuse" - 2009 (Vice Records UK)
- "Disconnection/99 Victs" - 2009 (Sub Pop Records Singles Club)
- "Before You Judge Me" - 2010 (Adult Swim)
- "Modern Art" - 2011 (Vice Records)
- "Family Tree" - 2011(Vice Records)
- "Sick of You" - 2012 (Vice Records)
- "Can't Hold On" - 2017 (Vice Records)
- "Squatting in Heaven" - 2017 (Vice Records)
- "Occidental Front" (featuring Yoko Ono) - 2017 (Vice Records)
- "Crystal Night" - 2017 (Vice Records)
- "Get It On Time" - 2020 (Fire Records / Vice Records)
- "Colt 44 / Alone and Forsaken" - 2021 (Wild Honey Records)
- "Gentleman" - 2021 (Fire Records / Vice Records)
- "No Rave" - 2022 (Fire Records)
- "Wild One" - 2025 (Fire Records)

=== Splits ===
- "Black Stereo / Dirt Mono" - 2006 with The Dirtbombs (Cass Records)
- "What To Do / Factory Girl" - 2007 with Demon's Claws (Norton Records)
- "Fader" - 2007 with YACHT (Fader / Southern Comfort 7" Series)
- "Christmas in Baghdad / Plump Righteous" - 2007 with The King Khan & BBQ Show (Norton Records)
- "Whirlyball" - 2007 with Baby Shakes, Gentleman Jesse & His Men, and Coffin Bound (Chunklet Magazine)
- "Live at the Clermont Lounge" - 2008 with The Subsonics (Rob's House Records)
- "MIA / Day Turns To Night / The Rest Of My Days / Little Prince" - 2008 with The Carbonas, Gentleman Jesse & His Men, and Predator (Rob's House Records)
- "Drugs / I'll Be With You" - 2009 with Lumina (Vice Records)
- "Best Napkin I Ever Had / The Doorway" - 2010 with Pierced Arrows (Scion Audio/Visual)
- "I Wanna Dance With You / Oh Summertime" - 2012 with Mark Sultan (HoZac Records)
- "Cowboy Knights" - 2013 with Icky Blossoms (Saddle Creek Records)
