= List of compositions by Reynaldo Hahn =

This is a list of compositions by Reynaldo Hahn sorted by genre, date of composition, titles and scoring.

Genre	Date	French title (original title)	English title	Scoring	Notes
Opera	1891–1893	L'île du rêve			Idylle polynésienne in 3 acts; libretto by André Alexandre (1860–1928) and Georges Hartmann after Pierre Loti
Opera	1902	La Carmélite		for soloists, chorus and orchestra	Comédie musicale in 4 acts; libretto by Catulle Mendès
Opera	1908	La pastorale de Noël, Mistère		for soloists, chorus and orchestra	Christmas Mystery (Oratorio) in 3 acts; libretto by Léonel de La Tourasse and Charles Gailly de Taurines (1857–1941)
Opera	1914	Miousic			Opérette in 3 acts; co-composed with Charles Lecocq and André Messager; libretto by Paul Ferrier
Opera	1919	Nausicaa	Nausicaa	for soloists, chorus and orchestra	Opéra comique in 3 acts; libretto by René Fauchois
Opera	1919	Fête triomphale			Opéra in 3 acts; libretto by St. Georges de Bouhélier
Opera	1921	La colombe de Bouddha		for soloists, chorus and orchestra	Conte lyrique japonais in 1 act; libretto by André Alexandre (1860–1928)
Opera	1923	Ciboulette	Ciboulette	for soloists, chorus and orchestra	Opérette in 3 acts; libretto by Robert de Flets and Francis de Croisset; 1933 film version Ciboulette directed by Claude Autant-Lara
Opera	1925	Mozart	Mozart	for soloists and orchestra	Comédie musicale in 3 acts; libretto by Sacha Guitry
Opera	1926	Une revue		for soloists, chorus and orchestra	Comédie musicale in 1 act; libretto by Maurice Donnay and Henri Duvernois
Opera	1926	Le temps d'aimer		for soloists, chorus and orchestra	Comédie musicale in 3 acts; libretto by Pierre Wolff (1865–1944), Henri Duvernois and Hugues Delorme
Opera	1930–1931	Brummel	Brummel	for soloists, chorus and orchestra	Opérette in 3 acts, 5 scenes; libretto by Rip (Georges Gabriel Thenon) and Robert Dieudonné
Opera	1932–1933	Ô mon bel inconnu		for soloists and orchestra	Comédie musicale in 3 acts; libretto by Sacha Guitry
Opera	1935	Le marchand de Venise	The Merchant of Venice	for soloists, chorus and orchestra	Opéra in 3 acts; libretto by Miguel Zamacoïs after the play by William Shakespeare
Opera	1935	Malvina	Malvina		Opérette in 3 acts; libretto by Maurice Donnay and Henri Duvernois
Opera	1936	Beaucoup de bruit pour rien	Much Ado About Nothing		Comédie musicale in 4 acts; libretto by Jean Sarment after the play by William Shakespeare
Opera	1942	Le oui des jeunes filles			Comédie lyrique in 3 acts; libretto by René Fauchois after Leandro Fernández de Moratín; orchestrated by Büsser
Ballet	1892	Fin d'amour			Ballet-pantomime; libretto by Eugène Berrier
Ballet	1909	La fête chez Thérèse			Ballet-pantomime in 2 acts; libretto by Catulle Mendès
Ballet	1909	Les fêtes de l'hymen et de l'amour			Ballet
Ballet	1910	Le bois sacré			Ballet-pantomime in 1 act, 2 scenes; libretto by Edmond Rostand
Ballet	1912	Le dieu bleu			Ballet in 1 act; libretto by Jean Cocteau and Frédéric de Madrazo
Ballet	1925	Degas, Suite de danses			Ballet for Carina Ari
Ballet	1932	Valses			Ballet for Carina Ari; orchestration of piano music by Johannes Brahms
Ballet	1937	Aux bosquets d'Italie			Ballet in 2 scenes; libretto by Abel Hermant
Incidental music	1890	L'obstacle Aubade espagnole			Pièce in 4 acts by Alphonse Daudet
Incidental music	1895	Nocturne			for the play by Maria Star (Ernesta de Hierschel Stern)
Incidental music	1897	Songe d'une matinée de printemps			
Incidental music	1898	Esther		for soloists, chorus and orchestra	Tragédie in a prologue and 3 acts by Jean Racine
Incidental music	1899	Dalila, Drame en 3 actes			for the play by Octave Feuillet
Incidental music	1902	Les deux courtisanes			for the play by Francis de Croisset
Incidental music	1902	Werther Noël (in E major)		for mezzo-soprano and children's chorus	for the play by Pierre Decourcelle after The Sorrows of Young Werther by Johann Wolfgang von Goethe
Incidental music	1904	Chiffon			for the play by René Peter and Robert Danceny
Incidental music	1905	Angelo, tyran de Padoue, Drame en 3 journées			for the play by Victor Hugo
Incidental music	1905	Scarron			for the play by Catulle Mendès
Incidental music	1906	La vierge d'Avila			for the play by Catulle Mendès
Incidental music	1909	L'impératrice			for the play by Catulle Mendès
Incidental music	1909	Judas			for the play by John de Kay
Incidental music	1911	Lucrèce Borgia			for the play by Victor Hugo
Incidental music	1911	Méduse Au bord de la fontaine Danse, petite sirène Au pays des sables d'or Invocation Nous nous couvrirons de poussière Que les dieux protègent notre ville Nous ne te verrons plus et terre divine	Méduse	for soloists, speaker, chorus and orchestra	for the play by Maurice Magre (1877–1941)
Incidental music	1914	Gala Sarah Bernhardt Prélude Rêverie Pavane florentine La reine au jardin L'oasis Défilé joyeux.			for the Gala des Annales
Incidental music	1919	L'homme à la rose			for the play by Henry Bataille
Incidental music	1919–1920	Andrea del Sarto			for the play by Alfred de Musset
Incidental music	1923	Manon, fille galante: 1. Les amants 2. L'inconstante; 3. La dolente 4. L'enjoleuse; 5. La frivole 6. Le souvenir		for orchestra	for the play by Henry Bataille and Albert Flament after the novel Manon Lescaut by Abbé Prévost
Incidental music	1924	La reine de Sheba, Scène lyrique		for soloists and 2 pianos	for the play by Edmond Fleg
Incidental music	1925	Seigneur Polichinelle			for the play by Miguel Zamacoïs
Incidental music	1937	L'homme avec dix femmes			for the play by Miguel Zamacoïs
Incidental music	1937	Laure et Pétrarque			for the play by Émile Ripert
Incidental music	1939	Entre nous			
Incidental music		L'An mil			
Incidental music		Athalie, Tragédie en 5 actes			for the play by Jean Racine
Film score	1934	La dame aux Camélias	The Lady of the Camellias		directed by Fernand Rivers and Abel Gance
Film score	1934	Sapho	Sapho		directed by Léonce Perret
Orchestral	1891	Illustration pour le jardin de Bérénice		for chamber orchestra	
Orchestral	1893	Nuit d'amour bergamasque, Poème symphonique		for chamber orchestra	also for 2 pianos
Orchestral	1898	Marine		for chamber orchestra	
Orchestral	1905	Le Bal de Béatrice d'Este, Suite: 1. Entrée pour Ludovic le More; 2. Lesquercade; 3. Romanesque; 4. Ibérienne; 5. Léda et l'Oiseau: Intermède léonardesque 6. Courante; 7. Salut final au duc de Milan		for wind instruments, 2 harps and piano	3. also for flute, viola and piano (1910)
Orchestral	1905	Marche nuptiale	Wedding March	for chamber orchestra	
Orchestral	1914	En sourdine		for chamber orchestra	transcription
Orchestral	1931	Divertissement pour une fête de nuit: 1. La Nuit: Le Parc; 2. Trois tableaux mimés 3. Canzone (Sur le Lac); 4. Lumières: Valses dans les jardins		for saxophone, piano, string quartet and orchestra	
Orchestral	1945	Concerto provençal: 1. Sous les platanes 2. Sous les pins 3. Sous les oliviers		for chamber orchestra	also for flute, clarinet, bassoon, horn and string orchestra
Concertante	1901	Deux Cadences pour le Concerto pour deux pianos KV 365 de Mozart	2 Cadenzas for Concerto No. 10 for 2 Pianos in E♭ major, K. 365 by Wolfgang Amadeus Mozart	for 2 pianos	
Concertante	1902	Cadence pour le Concerto KV 491 de Mozart	Cadenza for Concerto No. 24 in C minor, K. 491 by Wolfgang Amadeus Mozart	for piano	
Concertante	1903	Prélude, valse et rigaudon	Prélude, valse et rigaudon	for harp and string orchestra (or piano)	on front cover: "Morceau de Councours pour le conservatoire royal de musique de Bruxelles Année, 1903"
Concertante	c.1905	Concerto en la mineur	Concerto in A minor	for cello and orchestra	incomplete (movement I only); published 1905 as "Concerto inachevé" by Éditions Salabert revised with cadenzas by Fernand Pollain orchestrated by Marius-François Gaillard
Concertante	1926–1927	Concerto en ré majeur	Concerto in D major	for violin and orchestra	premiered in 1928 by Gabriel Bouillon
Concertante	1930	Concerto en mi majeur	Concerto in E major	for piano and orchestra	premiered in 1931 by Magda Tagliaferro
Concertante	1939	Trois Cadences pour le Concerto pour flûte et harpe KV 299 de Mozart	3 Cadenzas for Concerto for Flute and Harp in C major, K. 299 by Wolfgang Amadeus Mozart	for flute and harp	
Concertante	1942	Concerto pour 5 instruments et orchestre			
Concertante	1945	Concerto provençal: 1. Sous les platanes 2. Sous les pins 3. Sous les oliviers		for flute, clarinet, bassoon, horn and string orchestra	also for chamber orchestra
Concertante	1948	Suite hongroise: 1. Parade; 2. Trois images de la Reine de Hongrie; 3. Chants et danses		for violin, string orchestra, piano and percussion	
Chamber music	1891	Le carnaval des vieilles poules	Le carnaval des vieilles poules	for 2 violins, viola, cello and piano	
Chamber music	1891–1892	Sérénade	Sérénade	for 2 violins, viola and cello	
Chamber music	1896	Trio en fa mineur pour piano, violon et violoncelle	Piano Trio in F minor	for violin, cello and piano	
Chamber music	1901	Romance en la majeur	Romance in A major	for violin and piano	
Chamber music	1903	Sarabande et thème varié en si bémol majeur	Sarabande and Theme with Variations in B♭ minor	for clarinet and piano	also for viola and orchestra written for the 1903 Concours du Conservatoire
Chamber music	1905	Pavane d'Angelo	Pavane d'Angelo	for flute (piccolo), clarinet, guitar, harp (or piano), 2 violins, viola and cello	from the incidental music Angelo, tyran de Padoue
Chamber music	1905	Variations chantantes sur un air ancien	Variations chantantes sur un air ancien	for cello and piano for double bass and piano	theme taken from Serse by George Frideric Handel transcribed 1939 for double bass and piano by the composer
Chamber music	1905	Variations sur un thème de Mozart en mi bémol majeur	Variations on a Theme of Mozart in E♭ major	for flute and piano	
Chamber music	1905, 1910	Romanesque en ut majeur	Romanesque in C major	for flute, viola and piano	original version from Le bal de Béatrice d'Este; transcribed 1910
Chamber music	1906	Nocturne en mi bémol majeur	Nocturne in E♭ major	for violin and piano	
Chamber music	1911	2 Improvisations sur des airs irlandais: 1. The Little Red-Lark (Le petit bouvreuil); 2. The Willow-Tree (Le saule)	2 Improvisations on Irish Airs: 1. The Little Red-Lark; 2. The Willow-Tree	for cello and piano	
Chamber music	1913	2 Pièces: 1. Danse pour une déesse 2. L'enchanteur	2 Pièces: 1. Dance for a Goddess; 2. The Enchanter	for flute and piano	
Chamber music	1921	Quintette en fa dièse mineur pour piano et cordes	Piano Quintet in F♯ minor	for 2 violins, viola, cello and piano	
Chamber music	1926	Sonate en ut majeur pour violon et piano	Sonata in C major	for violin and piano	
Chamber music	1931	Divertissement pour une fête de nuit		for 2 violins, viola and cello	
Chamber music	1936	Églogue pour trio d'anches	Églogue	for oboe, clarinet and bassoon	
Chamber music	1937	Soliloque et forlane	Soliloque et forlane	for viola and piano	also orchestrated written for the Concours d'alto du Conservatoire de 1937
Chamber music	1939	Romance	Romance	for flute, violin, viola and cello	
Chamber music	1939	Quatuor en la mineur	String Quartet No. 1 in A minor	for 2 violins, viola and cello	
Chamber music	1939–1943	Quatuor en fa majeur	String Quartet No. 2 in F major	for 2 violins, viola and cello	composed during World War II; published 1946
Chamber music	1942	Sérénade	Sérénade	for flute, oboe, clarinet and bassoon	
Chamber music	1946	Quatour en sol majeur	Piano Quartet in G major	for violin, viola, cello and piano	
Chamber music		Lamento et tarantelle	Lamento et tarantelle	for clarinet and piano	
Miscellaneous	1936	Carillon pour pendule murale	Chime for a Wall Clock	for chimes	composed chimes for a wall clock produced by Armes et Cycles de Saint-Étienne
Organ		2 Préludes		for organ	
Piano	1883	L'inspiration, Valse	Inspiration, Waltz	for piano	
Piano	1889	Suite concertante		for piano	
Piano	1889	Une abeille	A Bee	for piano	
Piano	1890–1891	Les impressions: 1. Devant un tableau de Doucet; 2. Tristesse; 3. Regrets...		for piano	
Piano	1890–1893; 1891; 1893; 1890; 1893; 1893; 1891	Juvénilia, 6 Petites pièces: 1. Portrait; 2. La promenade 3. Demi-sommeil; 4. Feuillage; 5. Phœbé; 6. Les regards amoureux		for piano	
Piano	1891	Contour mélodique		for piano	
Piano	1891	Good bye!		for piano	
Piano	1891	Improvisazione		for piano	from the song Fleur de mon âme
Piano	1891	Notturno all'italiana		for piano	
Piano	1891	Pièces d'amour		for piano	
Piano	1891	Scherzo lent		for 2 pianos	
Piano	1892	Hyppomène et Atalante		for piano	
Piano	1892	Variations sur un thème de Charles Levadé		for piano 4-hands	theme: Charles-Gaston Levadé
Piano	1893	3 Préludes sur des airs populaires irlandais: 1. The Little Red Lark; 2. My Love's an Arbutus; 3. The Willow Tree		for piano 4-hands	
Piano	1894	Improvisation		for piano	
Piano	1894–1896	Portraits de peintres, 4 Pièces d'après les poésies de Marcel Proust: 1. Albert Cuyp; 2. Paulus Potter; 3. Anton van Dyck; 4. Antoine Watteau	Portraits of Painters, 4 Pieces after Poems of Marcel Proust: 1. Albert Cuyp; 2. Paulus Potter; 3. Anton van Dyck; 4. Antoine Watteau	for piano	1. in B♭ major 2. in E minor 3. in F major 4. in F♯ major
Piano	1895	La nativité: crèche de Nurenberg		for piano	
Piano	1896	Pièce en forme d'aria et de bergerie		for piano 4-hands	
Piano	1897	Caprice mélancolique		for 2 pianos	
Piano	1898	Premières valses Invitation à la valse: 1. Avec élégance 2. Allegretto con moto 3. "Ninette" – Très, très vite 4. Avec du mouvement 5. Pas vite, simplement (à l'Ombre rêveuse de Chopin); 6. Assez vite 7. "Berceau" – Modéré; 8. Pas vite 9. "La Feuille" – Un peu languissant 10. Sans rigueur ("...Le Plaisir vaporeux fuira vers lhorizon..." – Baudelaire)		for piano	Introduction and 10 waltzes
Piano	1902–1910	Le rossignol éperdu, 53 Poèmes I. Première suite: 1. Frontispice; 2. Andromède résignée 3. Douloureuse rêverie dans un bois de sapins 4. Le Bouquet de Pensées; 5. Soleil d'automne 6. Gretchen; 7. Les Deux Écharpes; 8. Liebe! Liebe!; 9. Éros caché dans les bois 10. La Fausse Indifférence; 11. Chanson de Midi; 12. Antiochus; 13. Nevermore; 14. Portrait; 15. L'Enfant au Perroquet; 16. Les Rêveries du Prince Églantine; 17. Ivresse; 18. L'Arome suprême 19. Berceuse féroce 20. Passante; 21. La Danse de l'Amour et de l'Ennui; 22. Ouranos; 23. Les Héliotropes du Clos-André; 24. Effet de Nuit sur la Seine; 25. Per i piccoli canali 26. Mirage; 27. La Danse de l'Amour et du Danger; 28. Matinée parisienne 29. Chérubin tragique 30. Les Chênes enlacés II. Orient; 31. En Caïque; 32. Narghilé; 33. Les Chiens de Galata; 34. Rêverie nocturne sur le Bosphore; 35. La Rose de Blida; 36. L'Oasis III. Carnet de voyage 37. L'Ange Verrier; 38. Le Jardin de Pétrarque; 39. La Nativité; 40. Faunesse dansante 41. Les Noces du Duc de Joyeuse; 42. Le Petit Mail; 43. Les Pages d'Élisabeth; 44. La Jeunesse et l'Été ornent de fleurs le tombeau de Pergolèse; 45. Vieux Bahuts (Musée d'Orléans) IV. Versailles; 46. Hommage à Martius; 47. La Reine au Jardin; 48. Le Réveil de Flore; 49. Le Banc songeur 50. La Fête de Terpsichore; 51. Adieux au soir tombant 52. Hivernale; 53. Le Pèlerinage inutile	The Bewildered Nightingale, 53 Poems I. First Suite: 1. Frontispiece; 2. Andromeda Resigned to Her Fate; 3. Pained Musings in a Pine Wood; 4. Cluster of Thoughts; 5. Autumn Sun; 6. Gretchen; 7. The Two Scarves; 8. Love! Love!; 9. Eros Hidden in the Woods; 10. Feigned Indifference; 11. Song of Midday; 12. Antiochus; 13. Never More; 14. Portrait; 15. The Child with a Parrot; 16. The Musings of Prince Eglantine; 17. Intoxication; 18. Sublime Aroma; 19. Impatient Cradle Song; 20. Passer-by; 21. The Dance of Love and Boredom; 22. Uranus; 23. Les Héliotropes du Clos-André; 24. Night Impressions on the Seine; 25. Along the Little Canals; 26. Mirage; 27. The Dance of Love and Danger; 28. Morning in Paris; 29. Tragic Cherub; 30. The Entwined Oaks II. Orient; 31. In a Caïque; 32. The Hookah; 33. The Dogs of Galata; 34. Nocturnal Musings on the Bosphorus; 35. The Rose at Blida; 36. The Oasis III. Travel Notes; 37. The Glass Angel; 38. The Garden of Petrarch; 39. The Nativity Crib in Nuremberg; 40. Dancing Faun; 41. The Marriage of the Duke of Joyeuse; 42. The Little Promenade; 43. The Pages of Elizabeth; 44. Youth and Summer Adorn with Flowers the Tomb of Pergolesi; 45. Old Furniture (Musée d'Orléans) IV. Versailles; 46. Homage to Martial; 47. The Queen in Her Garden; 48. The Awakening of Spring; 49. Bench Dreamer; 50. The Feast of Terpsichore; 51. Farewell to the Fading Evening; 52. Winter Ascent; 53. The Futile Pilgrimage	for piano	
Piano	1904	7 Berceuses: 1. Berceuse des jours sans nuages 2. Berceuse pour la veille de Noël; 3. Berceuse pour les enfants de marins 4. Berceuse des soirs d'automne 5. "Selfiana": Berceuse créole 6. Berceuse pensive (à trois mains); 7. Berceuse tendre		for piano 4-hands: 6. for piano 3-hands	
Piano	1904	Variations puériles sur une mélodie de Carl Reinecke	Puerile Variations on a Melody of Carl Reinecke	for piano 4-hands	
Piano	1905	Bacchante endormie		for piano	
Piano	1905	Pavane d'Angelo	Pavane in B♭ major from Angelo, tyran de Padoue	for piano	from the incidental music for the play by Victor Hugo original for orchestra; transcription by the composer
Piano	1907	Sonatine en ut majeur	Sonatina in C major	for piano	
Piano	1909	Canon dans le mode phrygien	Canon in Phrygian Mode	for piano	
Piano	1909	Thème varié sur le nom de Haydn	Theme and Variations on the Name of Haydn in G major	for piano	
Piano	1910	Les fêtes de l'hymen et de l'amour ou Les dieux de l'Egypte		for piano	transcription of a piece by Jean-Philippe Rameau
Piano	1911	Préface en musique		for piano	
Piano	1915	Le ruban dénoué, 12 valses à 2 pianos et une mélodie: 1. Décrets indolents du hasard 2. Les soirs d'Albi; 3. Souvenir...avenir...; 4. Danse de l'amour et du chagrin 5. Le demi-sommeil embaumé 6. L'anneau perdu 7. Danse du doute et de l'espérance 8. La cage ouverte 9. Soir d'orage 10. Les baisers 11. Il sorriso 12. Le seul amour 13. Puisque j'ai mis ma lèvre...	The Untied Ribbon, 12 Waltzes for 2 Pianos and a Song	for 2 pianos (Nos. 1~12): 13. for voice and piano	13. words by Victor Hugo
Piano	1915	Les jeunes lauriers, Marche militaire en si bémol majeur	Les jeunes lauriers, Military March in B♭ major	for piano	
Piano	1915	Pour bercer un convalescent: 1. Andantino sans lenteur 2. Andantino non lento 3. Andantino espressivo		for 2 pianos	
Piano	1927	2 Études	2 Études	for piano	
Choral	1888–1933	Le pauvre d'Assise			Oratorio
Choral	1890	Aubade espagnole		for tenor, male chorus and piano	from the incidental music L'obstacle by Alphonse Daudet also for 2 tenors, baritone and piano
Choral	1896	Cantique sur le bonheur des justes et le malheur des réprouvés		for female chorus and piano	words from Cantiques spirituels by Jean Racine; also for voice and piano
Choral	1896	Les Bretonnes, Duo		for female chorus and piano	words by Charles Le Goffic; also for soprano, alto and piano
Choral	1897	Chanson de pirates		for 2 tenors and male chorus a cappella	words by Victor Hugo
Choral	1897	L'obscurité		for mixed chorus a cappella	words by Victor Hugo
Choral	1899–1900	10 Études latines: 1. Lydie; 2. Néère; 3. Salinum; 4. Thaliarque; 5. Lydé; 6. Vile potabis 7. Tyndaris; 8. Pholoé; 9. Phidylé; 10. Phyllis		for soloists, chorus and piano	words by Leconte de Lisle; 9. also used as Mélodies, Book 1, No. 20
Choral	1901	O fons Bandusiæ!, Fragment d'une Ode d'Horace		for soprano, female chorus and orchestra	words by Horace
Choral	1902	Les muses pleurant la mort de Ruskin		for 9 female voices, female chorus (wordless) and harp	
Choral	1908	Prométhée triomphant, Poème lyrique		for soloists, chorus and orchestra	words by Paul Reboux
Choral	1910	Le rosier et la colombe		for chorus (or 2 solo voices) a cappella	words by Jean Cocteau; published in La Revue musicale
Choral	1911	Aubade athénienne		for female chorus and piano	words by Paul Reboux; fragment d'un opéra esquissé
Choral	1917	Noctem quietam		for tenor, chorus and organ or piano (ad libitum)	
Choral	1925	À la lumière		for mixed chorus a cappella (piano ad libitum)	words by Anatole France
Choral	1938	Tu es Petrus, Motet		for bass, chorus and organ (ad libitum)	
Choral	1945	Cathédrale de Strasbourg, Cantate		for tenor, chorus and orchestra	words by Louis Aragon
Choral		Chœur pour célébrer l'heureuse arrivée d'Édouard Reisslerius (Rissler)		for soloist, chorus (in unison) and piano	
Vocal	1887–1890	7 Chansons grises: 1. Chanson d'automne 2. Tous d'eux 3. L'allée est sans fin 4. En sourdine 5. L'heure exquise 6. Paysage triste 7. La bonne chanson		for voice and piano	words by Paul Verlaine
Vocal	1888–1896	20 Mélodies, 1^{er} recueil: 1. Rêverie (1888); 2. Si mes vers avaient des ailes (1888); 3. Mai (1889); 4. Paysage (1890); 5. L'énamourée (1891); 6. Seule (1892); 7. La nuit (1891); 8. Offrande (1891); 9. Trois jours de vendange (1891); 10. Infidélité (1891); 11. Fêtes galantes (1892); 12. Cimetière de campagne (1893); 13. Fleur fanée (1892); 14. L'incrédule (1893); 15. Les cygnes (1892); 16. D'une prison... (1892); 17. Dernier vœu (1891); 18. Séraphine (1892); 19. Nocturne (1893); 20. À Phidylé! (1892)	20 Songs, Book I	for voice and piano: 20. for bass, chorus and piano 4-hands	1. words by Victor Hugo; 2. words by Victor Hugo; 3. words by François Coppée; 4. words by André Theuriet; 5. words by Théodore de Banville; 6. words by Théophile Gautier; 7. words by Théodore de Banville; also choral version: No. 11 of Rondels; 8. words by Paul Verlaine; 9. words by Alphonse Daudet; 10. words by Théophile Gautier; 11. words by Paul Verlaine; 12. words by Gabriel Vicaire; 13. words by Léon Dierx; 14. words by Paul Verlaine; 15. words by Armand Renaud (1836–1895); 16. words by Paul Verlaine; 17. words by Théodore de Banville; 18. words by Heinrich Heine; 19. words by Jean Lahor; 20. words by Leconte de Lisle; also used as No. 9 of Études latines
Vocal	1890	Aubade espagnole		for 2 tenors, baritone and piano	from the incidental music L'obstacle by Alphonse Daudet also for tenor, male chorus and piano
Vocal	1891	Aimons-nous!		for voice and piano	words by Théodore de Banville
Vocal	1891	Au clair de lune, Conte en musique: 1. Promenade; 2. Babillage et soleil 3. Lune; 4. Angélus; 5. Tristesse nocturne, l'oiseau de nuit 6. Petit ruisseau murmurant 7. Ver luisant 8. Le lys 9. Les orties 10. Le vent 11. Retour		for narrator and piano	text and illustrations by Louis Montégut
Vocal	1891	Comme un cri		for voice and piano	words by Théodore de Banville
Vocal	1891	Fleur de mon âme		for voice and piano	
Vocal	1891	Naïo		for voice and piano	words by Sully Prudhomme
Vocal	1891	Ressemblance		for voice and piano	words by Sully Prudhomme
Vocal	1891	2 Mélodies: 1. Adoration; 2. Hymne à Cléo	2 Songs	for voice and piano	
Vocal	1892	Lied		for voice and piano	words by François Coppée
Vocal	1892	Hymne		for voice and piano	words by Victor Hugo
Vocal	1892	Le Bon repos		for voice and piano	
Vocal	1896	Cantique sur le bonheur des justes et le malheur des réprouvés		for voice and piano	words from Cantiques spirituels by Jean Racine; also for female chorus and piano
Vocal	1896	Les Bretonnes, Duo		for soprano, alto (or female chorus) and piano	words by Charles Le Goffic
Vocal	1896	2 Mélodies en allemand: 1. Mädchen mit dem roten Mündchen; 2. An die Nachtigall	2 Songs	for voice and piano	words by Heinrich Heine
Vocal	1896	Naguère au temps des églantines		for voice and piano	words by Catulle Mendès
Vocal	1896–1921	20 Mélodies, 2^{e} recueil: 1. Quand la nuit n'est pas étoilée (1900); 2. Cantique (1896); 3. La délaissée (1898); 4. La chère blessure (1900); 5. Théone (1897); 6. Le souvenir d'avoir chanté (1898); 7. Quand je fus pris au pavillon (1899); 8. Chanson au bord de la fontaine (1911, 1912); 9. Sur l'eau (1902); 10. Fumée (1906); 11. Le printemps (1899); 12. Dans la nuit (1904); 13. Les fontaines (1910); 14. À Chloris (1913); 15. Le rossignol des lilas (1913); 16. À nos morts ignorées (1918); 17. Ma jeunesse (1918); 18. Le plus beau présent (1917); 19. Puisque j'ai mis ma lèvre... (1896); 20. La douce paix (1921)	20 Songs, Book II	for voice and piano	1. words by Victor Hugo; 2. words by Jean Racine; also for female chorus and piano 3. words by Augustine-Malvina Blanchecotte (1830–1897); 4. words by Augustine-Malvina Blanchecotte (1830–1897); 5. words by Jean Moréas; 6. words by Catulle Mendès; 7. words by Charles d'Orléans; 8. words by Maurice Magre; from the incidental music Méduse; 9. words by Sully Prudhomme; 10. words by Jean Moréas; also used as No. 8 of Les feuilles blessées 11. words by Théodore de Banville; 12. words by Jean Moréas; also used as No. 5 of Les feuilles blessées 13. words by Henri de Régnier; 14. words by Théophile de Viau; 15. words by Léopold Dauphin; 16. words by Louis Hennevé; also known as Aux morts de Vauquois; 17. words by Elena Văcărescu; 18. words by Maurice Magre (1877–1941); 19. words by Victor Hugo; also published with piano work Le ruban dénoué 20. words by Léon Guillot de Saix
Vocal	1897	Agnus Dei		for soprano, baritone and organ	
Vocal	1897	L'alouette		for voice and piano	published in the collection L'âme enfantine, 50 Chansons pour les écoles by Marc Legrand, 1897
Vocal	1897–1898	12 Rondels: 1. Le jour 2. Je me metz en vostre mercy 3. Le printemps 4. L'air; 5. La paix 6. Gardez le trait de la fenêtre 7. La pêche 8. Quand je fus pris au pavillon 9. Les étoiles 10. L'automne; 11. La nuit 12. Le souvenir d'avoir chanté	12 Rondels	for soloists, mixed chorus and piano	1. words by Théodore de Banville; 2.words by Charles d'Orléans; 3.~5. words by Théodore de Banville; 6. words by Charles d'Orléans; 7. words by Théodore de Banville; 8. words by Charles d'Orléans; 9.~11. words by Théodore de Banville; 11. also vocal version: No. 7 of 20 Mélodies, 1^{er} recueil 12. words by Catulle Mendès
Vocal	1898	Le Destin "Phèdre"		for voice and piano	
Vocal		Es-tu bien sûr que tu ne m'aimes pas		for voice and piano	words by Augustine-Malvina Blanchecotte (1830–1897)
Vocal		Pâques païennes		for voice and piano	words by "Vincent-Eloy", pseudonym of Albert Eloy-Vincent (1868–1945)
Vocal		Que lentement passent		for voice and piano	words by Guillaume Apollinaire
Vocal		L'amour		for voice and piano	
Vocal	1899	Le marchand des marrons		for voice and piano	words by Paul Collin
Vocal	1899	Adieu!	Adieu!	for voice and piano	words by Stéphan Bordèse; published in the collection Chansons de Page
Vocal	1899	Amour sans ailes: 1. Ah! Te serrer dans mes bras!; 2. Le chêne mort 3. Non! Vous ne m'aimez pas	Love without Wings: 1. Ah! Could I Clasp Thee in Mine Arms!; 2. The Fallen Oak; 3. I Know You Love Me Not	for voice and piano	words by Mary Robinson published 1899, 1904 and 1911
Vocal	1900	O Salutaris	O Salutaris	for tenor and piano or organ	words attributed to St. Francis of Assisi
Vocal	1901	À une étoile		for voice and piano	words by Alfred de Musset
Vocal	1901	Venezia, 6 Chansons en dialecte vénitien: 1. Sopra l'acqua indormenzada 2. La Barcheta; 3. L'Avertimento; 4. La Biondina in gondoleta 5. Che pecà!; 6. La Primavera	Venezia, 6 Songs in the Venetian Dialect	for voice and piano	French version by Maurice Léna; 1. words by Pietro Pagello (1807–1898); 2.~3. words by Pietro Buratti; 4. words by Antonio Lamberti; 5. words by Francesco Dall'Ongaro; 6. words by Alvise Cicogna; paraphrase for piano by Albert Périlhou (1907)
Vocal	1901–1906	Les feuilles blessées: 1. Dans le ciel est dressé le chêne séculaire (1901); 2. Encor sur le pavé, sonne mon pas nocturne (1901); 3. Quand reviendra l'automne (1903); 4. Belle lune d'argent (1904); 5. Quand je viendrai m'asseoir (1904); 6. Eau printanière (1905); 7. Donc vous allez fleurir encor (1905); 8. Compagne de l'éther (1906); 9. Pendant que je médite (1906); 10. Roses en bracelet (1906); 11. Aux rayons du couchant (1906)		for voice and piano	words by Jean Moréas: 5. also used as No. 12 Dans la nuit from 20 Mélodies, 2^{e} recueil; 8. also used as No. 10 Fumée from 20 Mélodies, 2^{e} recueil
Vocal	1903	J'ai caché dans la Rose en Pleurs!		for voice and piano	words by Armand Silvestre
Vocal	1904	Avoir des ailes de colombe	Oh! For the Wings of a Dove	for voice and piano	words by Mary Robinson
Vocal	1904	Sérénade	Sérénade	for tenor, baritone and piano	words by Victor Hugo
Vocal	1906	Au pays musulman		for voice and piano	words by Henri de Régnier
Vocal	1907	Chansons et madrigaux: 1. Un loyal cœur 2. Vivons, Mignarde!; 3. Pleurez avec moi!; 4. En vous disant adieu 5. Comment se peut-il faire ainsi?; 6. Les fourriers d'été		for 3 or 4 voices and piano (ad libitum)	1., 5., 6. words by Charles d'Orléans; 2. words by Jean-Antoine de Baïf; 3. words by Agrippa d'Aubigné; 4. anonymous 17th-century words; composed in the style of Antoine Boësset
Vocal	1908	Dans l'été		for voice and piano	words by Marceline Desbordes-Valmore
Vocal	1910	Le rosier et la colombe		for 2 voices (soli or chorus) a cappella	words by Jean Cocteau; published in La Revue musicale
Vocal	1911	Danse, petite sirène		for voice and piano (with female chorus ad libitum)	words by Maurice Magre (1877–1941); from the incidental music for Méduse
Vocal	1915	5 Little Songs (5 Petites chansons): 1. The Swing (La balançoire); 2. Windy Nights (Nuits de grand vent); 3. My Ship and I (Mon petit bateau); 4. The Stars (Les étoiles); 5. A Good Boy (Un bon petit garçon)	5 Little Songs: 1. The Swing; 2. Windy Nights; 3. My Ship and I 4. The Stars (Escape at Bedtime); 5. A Good Boy	for voice and piano	words from A Child's Garden of Verses by Robert Louis Stevenson; French translation by Maurice Léna
Vocal	1934	La dame aux Camélias: 1. C'est à Paris!; 2. Mon rêve était d'avoir 3. Au fil de l'eau	The Lady of the Camellias	for voice and piano	words by Albert Willemetz from the 1934 film score La Dame aux Camélias sung by Yvonne Printemps
Vocal	1947	Chansons espagnoles: 1. Aubade à doña Sol; 2. Mon amour		for voice and piano	words by Léon Guillot de Saix
Vocal		9 Mélodies retrouvées: 1. Je me souviens 2. La vie est belle 3. L'amitié; 4. Chanson; 5. Naïs; 6. La nymphe de la source 7. Au rossignol 8. Ta main 9. Sous l'oranger: Tango-habañera		for voice and piano	published posthumously in 1955; 1.~2. words by Léon Guillot de Saix; 3. words by Lucien Paté; 4. words by Catulle Mendès; 5.~6. anonymous words 7.~9. words by Léon Guillot de Saix

== See also ==
- List of works for the stage by Reynaldo Hahn
