= List of works for the stage by Reynaldo Hahn =

This is a complete list of stage works by Reynaldo Hahn (1874–1947).

== List ==
Title	Genre	Subdivisions	Libretto	Première date	Place, theatre
Fin d'amour	ballet-pantomime		Eugène Berrier	24 April 1892	Paris, Cercle Funambulesque
L'île du rêve	idylle polynésienne	3 acts	André Alexandre and Georges Hartmann, after Pierre Loti	23 March 1898	Paris Opéra-Comique
La Carmélite	comédie musicale	4 acts	Catulle Mendès	16 December 1902	Paris, Opéra-Comique
La pastorale de Noël	mystère	3 acts	Léonel de la Tourasse and Gailly de Taurines	23 December 1908	Paris, Théâtre des Arts
Les fêtes de l'hymen et de l'amour	ballet			1909	
La fête chez Thérèse	ballet-pantomime	2 acts	Catulle Mendès	16 February 1910	Paris, Opéra
Le dieu bleu	ballet	1 act	Jean Cocteau and Frédéric de Madrazo	13 May 1912	Paris, Théâtre du Châtelet
Le bois sacré	ballet-pantomime	2 parts	Edmond Rostand	1912	Paris, Théâtre Sarah-Bernhardt
Miousic (together with Rodolphe Berger, Charles Cuvillier, Jules Erlanger, Henri Hirchmann, Louis Lecombe, Charles Lecocq, Xavier Leroux, André Messager, Willy Redstone and Paul Vidal)	opérette	3 acts	Paul Ferrier	22 March 1914	Paris, Olympia
Nausicaa	opéra comique	3 acts	René Fauchois	10 April 1919	Monte Carlo
Fête triomphale	opéra	3 acts	St Georges de Bouhélier	14 July 1919	Paris, Opéra
La colombe de Bouddha	conte lyrique	1 act	André Alexandre	21 March 1921	Cannes
Ciboulette	opérette	3 acts	Robert de Flets and Francis de Croisset	7 April 1923	Paris, Théâtre des Variétés
Degas	spectacle de danses			1925	
Mozart	comédie musicale	3 acts	Sacha Guitry	2 December 1925	Paris, Théâtre Édouard VII
La reine de Scheba	scène lyrique	1 act	Edmond Fleg	6 March 1926	Paris, Théâtre du Châtelet
Une revue	comédie musicale	1 act	Maurice Donnay and Henri Duvernois	28 October 1926	Paris, Théâtre de la Porte Saint-Martin
Le temps d'aimer	comédie musicale	3 acts	Pierre Wolff, Henri Duvernois and Hugues Delorme	7 November 1926	Paris, Théâtre de la Michodière
Brummel	opérette	3 acts	Rip (Georges Gabriel Thenon) and Robert Dieudonné	16 January 1931	Paris, Folies Wagram
Valses	ballet			1932	
Ô mon bel inconnu	comédie musicale	3 acts	Sacha Guitry	5 October 1933	Paris, Théâtre des Bouffes Parisiens
Le marchand de Venise	opéra	3 acts	Miguel Zamacoïs, after Shakespeare's The Merchant of Venice	25 March 1935	Paris, Opéra
Malvina	opérette		Maurice Donnay and Henri Duvernois	23 March 1935	Paris, Théâtre de la Gaîté-Lyrique
Beaucoup de bruit pour rien	comédie musicale	4 acts	J Sarment, after Shakespeare's Much Ado About Nothing	March 1936	Paris, Théâtre de la Madeleine
Aux bosquets d'Italie	ballet	2 scenes	Abel Hermant	1937	Paris, Opéra
Le oui des jeunes filles (orchestrated by Büsser)	comédie lyrique	3 acts	René Fauchois, after Leandro Fernández de Moratín	21 June 1942	Paris, Opéra-Comique
