= Joseph Morpain =

French pianist (1873–1961)

Joseph Morpain (1873 – 12 February 1961) was a French pianist and teacher at the Conservatoire de Paris and École Normale de Musique de Paris, whose prominent students included Clara Haskil and Monique Haas.

== Career ==
He studied at the Conservatoire de Paris in the class of Émile Decombes, a pupil of Frédéric Chopin. Reynaldo Hahn was one of his classmates. He was also a student of Gabriel Fauré.

His own pupils at the Conservatoire and the École Normale de Musique included Clara Haskil, Monique Haas, Lucien Wang, Madeleine de Valmalète, Raymond Trouard, Carmen-Marie-Lucie Guilbert, Pierre Maillard-Verger, and Ramon Coll.

He was acting Director of the École Normale de Musique from 1944.

He published "Comment il faut jouer du piano", and "50 Chansons des Charentes et du Poitou" (1924).

Reynaldo Hahn dedicated the first two of his Premières valses (1898) to Morpain.
