= Ô mon bel inconnu =

Comédie musicale composed by Reynaldo Hahn

Ô mon bel inconnu is a comédie musicale in three acts (four tableaux) composed by Reynaldo Hahn with a libretto by Sacha Guitry. It was first staged at the Théâtre des Bouffes-Parisiens in Paris in 1933. The plot concerns the wife, daughter and maid of a Parisian hatter, who all reply to his 'lonely heart' advert, and takes place in Paris and Biarritz.

== Background ==
This is Hahn's second stage work with Guitry after Mozart in 1925, but this time "a modern dress musical comedy". Traubner notes that it was "too refined and slight for a public that was slowly nurturing a taste for thumping spectaculars". Grove opines that the work contains "Hahn's most infectious tune, the title song" for the three main female voices. There is around an hour's worth of music, and the vocal score was published by Salabert in 1933. Henry Malherbe, in a review in Le Temps highlighted the overture (which quotes the second finale), two airs for the men in the first act - recalling Manon and the Wedding March, the (title) waltz song for the women, the 'Téléphonage' in strict counterpoint, concluding that Hahn fulfils all the listener's expectations.

== Principal roles ==
Role	Voice type	Premiere cast, 5 October 1933 (Conductor: Marcel Cariven)
Prosper Aubertin, a hatter	baritone	Jean Aquistapace
Antoinette Aubertin, his wife	soprano	Suzanne Dantès
Marie-Anne, his daughter	soprano	Simone Simon
Félicie, his maid	mezzo-soprano	Arletty
Hilarion Lallumette, a mute family friend	tenor	René Koval
Jean Paul Lévy, Antoinnette's admirer	tenor	Pierre Vyot
Claude Aviland, Marie-Anne's admirer	baritone	Guy Ferrant
M. Victor	baritone	Abel Tarride

== Synopsis ==
Prosper Aubertin, the owner of a hat shop in Paris, bored with his business and the quarrels and frustrations of home life, places a personal ad in a paper stating « Monsieur, célibataire, désire trouver âme sœur. » (Single gentleman seeks soul-mate). Of the many replies he chooses one signed by a countess and arranges a rendez-vous with her at the Louvre; but he is indignant to find the hand-writing of his wife Antoinette, and that of his daughter among other replies, both confessing to unhappiness in their lives. They have also lost interest in the suitors among the shop customers: Jean-Paul for Antoinette, Claude Aviland for Marie-Anne. On reflection, seeing that they too are looking for escape he writes back and makes appointments with them too. Each of the women (Félicie being the unknown countess) hum "Ô mon bel inconnu" on the way to their rendez-vous.

In fact the final rendez-vous is a distance away: a villa owned by a M. Victor in the basque region rented for a week by Aubertin. Victor is mistaken for the inconnu by the Madame Aubertin and Marie-Anne. All is sorted out in the end, and even Hilarion Lallumette, a mute friend of Aubertin and confidant of the women regains his voice. The Aubertins get back together, Prosper persuades Marie-Anne that the man with whom she was exchanging letters was Claude (who has arrived to ask for her hand), and Victor pairs off with Félicie.

== Recordings ==
Around 20 songs were recorded on 78s at the time of the first run with several of the role creators, and with Hahn himself joining Arletty for the Act 2 couplets "A la chalcographie"; the title song was recorded with Simone Simon, Marthe Coiffier and Germaine Cernay. A 1971 radio broadcast featuring Aimé Doniat, Michel Hamel, Lina Dachary and Christiane Château was later issued on CD by Gaîté Lyrique, and a complete studio recording was issued in 2021.
