= Lina Dachary =

French soprano

Lina Dachary was a French soprano born in 1922 and died in 1999. She was particularly noted for her prolific radio appearances in operetta.

== Life and career ==
Originally from the Basque region, having obtained a Conservatoire first prize, an early radio performance was in Ninon de Lenclos with music by Louis Mainqueneau, conducted by François Ruhlmann on 21 June 1944. At the Opéra-Comique in Paris she sang the role of Adèle in the opérette Malvina by Hahn on 12 July 1945.

She appeared at the Besançon Festival in 1948. Moving over to the light opera repertoire, she appeared at the Théâtre de l'Empire in La belle de Cadix alongside Luis Mariano in 1949, later dubbing Carmen Sevilla in the 1953 film.

At the 1953 Venice Festival she sang alongside André Vessières and Aimé Doniat in Françaix's L'Apostrophe (1947), a tale of cuckoldry, taken from Balzac's Cent Contes drolatiques, in which she also appeared in Strasbourg in their 1958–59 season. She sang in a successful revival of L'Auberge du cheval blanc at the Théâtre du Châtelet in the early 1950s.

From the 1950s to 1970s Dachary sang many leading roles in operettas and light operas on French radio. The Operadis site lists 68 recordings dating from 1948 to 1974 of 62 works; her Bibliothèque nationale de France (National Library of France) entry also has 68 recordings listed, with differences, and a total of 49 operatic works. For some pieces Dachary participated in several different broadcasts; the Encyclopédie multimédia de la comédie musicale site gives five of Monsieur Beaucaire alone. Many of these radio recordings were subsequently issued on LP or CD.

She was still appearing on the radio in the mid-1970s, for instance a public concert performance in the 'Auditorium 104' of the Maison de l'ORTF of Tom Jones by Philidor in 1975. Reviewing a CD of a 1958 recording of L'Ile de Tulipatan (in which she sang Alexis), the Opera magazine critic noted she "excelled in this repertoire... stars of the day who still twinkle brightly". Another reviewer commented on the bolero from La chanson de Fortunio that it was "sung with panache by the indefatigable Lina Dachary", adding that her "voice is nothing special but she has the diction, the style and the accent of a real Paris leading lady".

On her retirement she returned to her home region.

== Discography ==
The following list gives the work, role played by Dachary, and where possible original record label and year of recording.

- Les absents - Suzette (Musidisc «Gaieté Lyrique»)
- Barbe-bleue - Boulotte (Bourg 1967) (Gänzl)
- Le barbier de Trouville - Cardine (Musidisc «Gaieté Lyrique» 1973)
- Les Bavards - Béatrix (Erato 1968) (Gänzl)
- Casanova by Wal-Berg - Thérèse (Pathé 1954)
- La chanson de Fortunio - Madame Fortunio (Musidisc «Gaieté Lyrique» 1963)
- Les Cloches de Corneville - Germaine (Véga 1962)
- Le coeur et la main - Micaëla (Musidisc «Gaieté Lyrique» 1963)
- Coups de roulis - Béatrice (Musidisc Gaieté Lyrique 1958)
- La Créole - Antoniette (Bourg 1969)
- Le Docteur Miracle - Véronique (Barclay Inédits 1973)
- Das Dreimäderlhaus - Annette (Decca, 1962)
- Le farfadet - Babet (Musidisc «Gaieté Lyrique» 1970)
- La fille de Madame Angot - Clairette (Pathé 1950) (Gänzl)
- François les bas-bleus - Fanchon (Musidisc «Gaieté Lyrique» 1962)
- Giroflé-Girofla - Giroflé & Girofla (Musidisc «Gaieté Lyrique» 1963)
- Le grand mogol - Bengaline (Musidisc «Gaieté Lyrique» 1969)
- Joli Gilles - Violette (Musidisc «Gaieté Lyrique» 1969)
- Lischen et Fritzchen - Lischen (Bourg 1969)
- Madame l'archiduc - Marietta (Musidisc «Gaieté Lyrique» 1963)
- Miss Helyett - title role (Musidisc «Gaité Lyrique» 1963)
- Le médecin malgré lui - Jacqueline (Musidisc «Gaieté Lyrique» 1972)
- Monsieur Beaucaire - Lady Mary Carlisle (Musidisc «Gaieté Lyrique» 1958)
- Les mousquetaires au couvent - Marie (Pathé 1953) (Gänzl)
- Le muletier - Inésia (Musidisc «Gaieté Lyrique» 1968)
- Le nouveau seigneur de village - Babet (Musidisc «Gaieté Lyrique» 1971)
- Ô mon bel inconnu - Antoinette Aubertin (1971)
- L'Omelette à la Follembuche - Baronne de Follembuche (Musidisc «Gaieté Lyrique» 1973)
- Passionnément - Ketty (Musidisc «Gaieté Lyrique» 1964)
- Les rendez-vous bourgeois - Louise (Musidisc «Gaieté Lyrique» 1971)
- Le petit Faust - Marguérite (1960s)
- Rip - Nelly (Musidisc «Gaieté Lyrique» 1961)
- Rose-Marie - Rose-Marie (Pathé 1950)
- La toison d'or - Brigitte (Voix de son maître 1955)
- Valses de Vienne - La Comtesse (Véga, 1962)
- La Veuve joyeuse - Nadia (Polydor 1959)
- La vie parisienne - La Baronne de Gondremarck (Pathé 1953)
- Les voitures versées - Aurore (Musidisc «Gaieté Lyrique» 1971)
- Le Voyage en Chine - Berthe (Musidisc «Gaieté Lyrique» 1968)
- Ein Walzertraum - Prinzessin Helene (Véga 1960)
- Der Zigeunerbaron - Saffi (Intégral classic)
