= Jean-Pierre Jacquillat =

French conductor (1935–1986)

- Born: 13 July 1935
- Origin: Versailles
- Died: 6 August 1986 (aged 51)
- Occupation: Conductor

Jean-Pierre Jacquillat (13 July 1935 – 6 August 1986) was a French conductor.

Jacquillat was born in Versailles in 1935. He was named assistant to Charles Munch at the Orchestre de Paris in 1967. He was chief conductor of the Iceland Symphony Orchestra. He made a number of recordings, with that orchestra, the Orchestre de Paris, and others. His career was cut short when he died in a car accident in 1986 in France, aged 51. In May 1973, Jacquillat conducted the French premiere, and only second production, of Martinů's film-opera Les trois souhaits at the Lyon Opera attended by the composer's widow.

== Biography ==
Jean-Pierre Jacquillat was born in Versailles on July 13, 1935.

He studied piano, chamber music, percussion, and harmony at the conservatories of Versailles and then Conservatoire de Paris.

In 1965, he gave his first concert with Samson François as soloist and has since pursued a career as a guest conductor.

In 1967, he was appointed assistant conductor to Charles Munch (conductor) at the Orchestre de Paris, with which he gave numerous concerts. In 1970, he became music director of the Angers orchestra, and the following year permanent conductor of the Opéra de Lyon and the Rhône-Alpes Philharmonic Orchestra.From 1975 to 1978, he was musical advisor to the Orchestre Lamoureux.

From 1980 to 1986, Jacquillat was principal conductor of the Iceland Symphony Orchestra. He made numerous recordings with this orchestra, the Orchestre de Paris, and other ensembles. Notable premieres he conducted include Claude Ballif's 6e Imaginaire (1976) and Jean Rivier Dolor (1977).

He died in Le Chambon-sur-Lignon on August 11, 1986.

== Recordings ==
His recordings include:

- arr. Joseph Canteloube: Chants d'Auvergne, with Victoria de los Ángeles and the Orchestre Lamoureux, Paris (released under EMI's Great Recordings of the Century series)
- Emmanuel Chabrier: España (Orchestre de Paris)
- Ernest Chausson: Poème de l'amour et de la mer and Chanson perpétuelle, with Victoria de los Ángeles and the Lamoureux Orchestra
- Claude Debussy: Prélude à l'après-midi d'un faune (Orchestre de Paris)
- Paul Dukas: The Sorcerer's Apprentice (Orchestre de Paris)
- Maurice Duruflé: Three dances for orchestra, Op. 6: Divertissement, Danse lente, Tambourin (Sydney Symphony)
- Karólína Eiríksdóttir (b. 1951): Sinfonietta (Iceland Symphony Orchestra) and Five Pieces for Chamber Orchestra (Iceland Chamber Orchestra)
- Reynaldo Hahn: Le Bal de Béatrice d'Este (Orchestre de Paris)
- Claude Joseph Rouget de Lisle arr. Hector Berlioz: La Marseillaise (Orchestre de Paris)
- Wolfgang Amadeus Mozart: Clarinet Concerto, with Einar Johanesson and the Iceland Symphony Orchestra
- Gabriel Pierné: Marche des petits soldats de plomb (March of the Little Lead Soldiers) (Orchestre de Paris)
- Maurice Ravel: Trois poèmes de Mallarmé (Jean-Christophe Benoît and the Orchestre de Paris Ensemble)
- Camille Saint-Saëns: Danse macabre (Orchestre de Paris)
- John Speight: Concerto for Clarinet "Melodious Birds Sing Madrigals", with Einar Johanneson (Iceland Symphony Orchestra).
