= Françoise Bourdin =

French novelist (1952–2022)

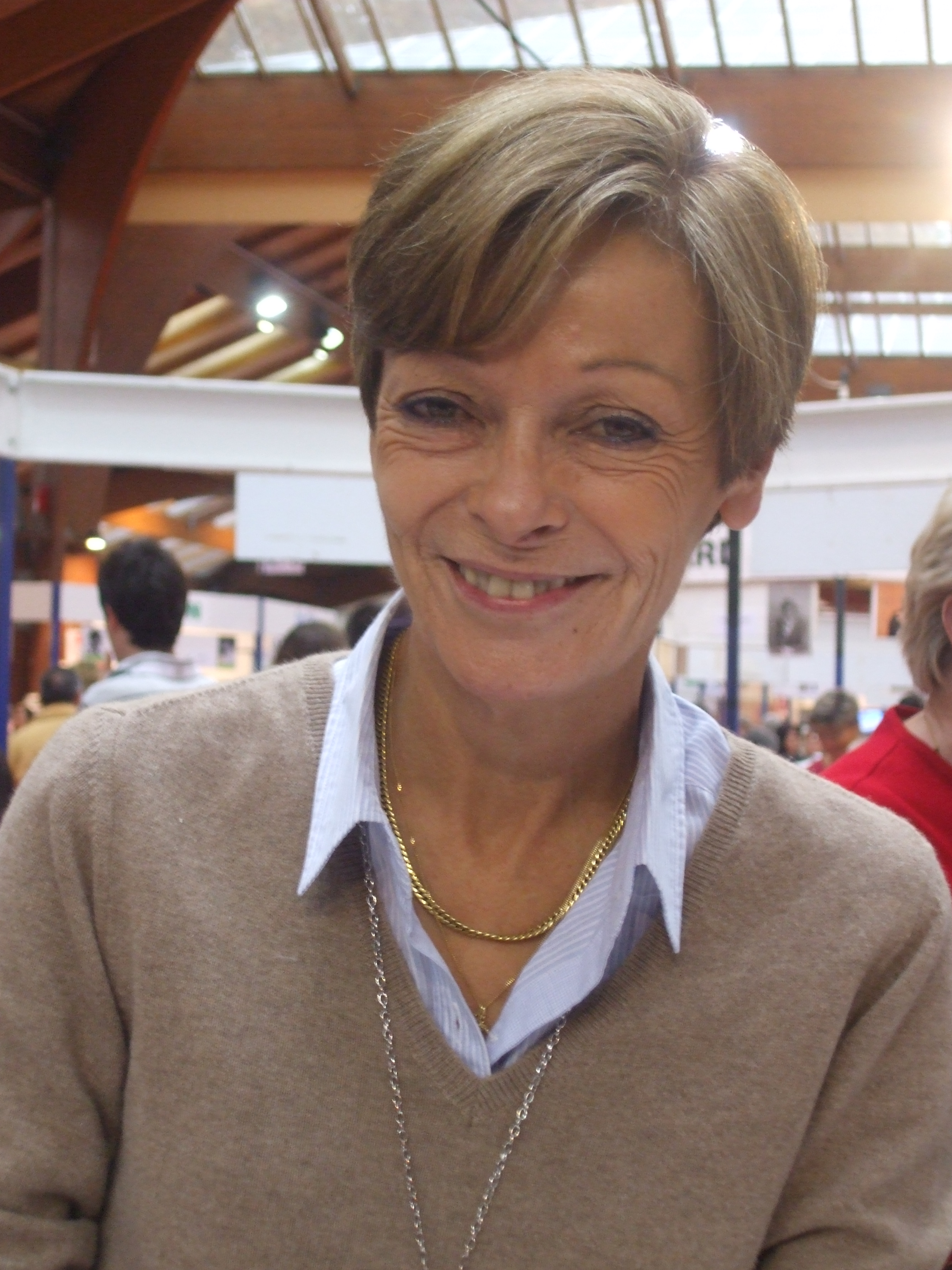
- Bourdin in 2010
- Born: 1952; Paris, France
- Died: 25 December 2022 (aged 70); Vernon, France
- Occupation: Writer

Françoise Bourdin (French pronunciation: [fʁɑ̃swaz buʁdɛ̃]; 1952 – 25 December 2022) was a French novelist.

== Biography ==
Françoise Bourdin was born in Paris, France. Her father Roger Bourdin and her mother Géori Boué were both professional opera singers. As a child she was interested in writing. She had already obtained her jockey license when she was 18, before she lost her first love in a racing accident a year later. She started her novel, Les soleils mouillés, when she was 20. Bourdin cut back on her writing as she had children. She returned to writing when she was 40 with Les sirènes de Saint-Malo.

Bourdin sold some 40 books in the last 25 years for a total of eight million sales. In 2011, she was in the 11th place on the French best-seller list.

Bourdin died on 25 December 2022, at the age of 70.

== Works ==
- Les Soleils mouillés, éd. Julliard, 1972
- De vagues herbes jaunes, 1973
- Sang et Or, 1991
- Mano à Mano, éd. Denoël, 1991; éd. Belfond, 2009
- Les Vendanges de juillet, éd. Belfond, 1994, 520 pages
- Juillet en hiver, 1995
- Terre Indigo . éd TF1 1996
- La Camarguaise, 1997
- Comme un frère, 1997
- Nom de jeune fille, 1999
- Les Vendanges de juillet, 1999
- L'Homme de leur vie, éd. Belfond, 2000; éd. Pocket, 2004
- Le Secret de Clara, éd. Belfond, 2000; éd. Pocket, 2004
- L'Héritage de Clara, éd. Belfond, 2001
- L'Héritier des Beaulieu, éd. Belfond, 2003, 320 pages.
- Les Sirènes de Saint-Malo, éd. Belfond, 2006, 333 pages
- Les Bois de Battandière, éd. Belfond, 2007, 312 pages
- Une nouvelle vie, éd. Belfond, 2008, 348 pages
- La Maison des Aravis, éd. Belfond; éd. Pocket, 2004
- Un été de canicule, éd. Belfond; éd. Pocket, 2004
- Les Années passion : Le roman d'une femme libre, éd. Belfond; éd. Pocket, 2004
- Un mariage d'amour, éd. Belfond; éd. Pocket, 2004
- Choix d'une femme libre, éd. Belfond; éd. Pocket, 2005
- Rendez-vous à Kerloc'h, éd. Belfond; éd. Pocket, 2006
- Objet de toutes les convoitises, éd. Belfond; éd. Pocket, 2006
- Une passion fauve, éd. Belfond; Pocket, 2007
- Bérill ou la passion en héritage, éd. Belfond; Pocket, 2007
- L'Inconnue de Peyrolles, éd. Belfond; éd. Pocket, 2008
- Un cadeau inespéré, éd. Belfond; éd. Pocket, 2008
- Une nouvelle vie, éd. Belfond, 2008 ISBN 9782714444509
- Dans le silence de l'aube, éd. Belfond, 2008 ISBN 978-2-7144-4354-0
- Sans regrets, éd. Belfond, 2009, ISBN 978-2-7144-4520-9
- Un soupçon d'interdit éd. France Loisirs, (Réf : 412544), 2009
- D'espoir et de promesse, éd. Belfond, 2010, ISBN 978-2-7144-4708-1
- Les Landes en héritage, tome 1 : Des grondements de l'océan, éd. Belfond, 2011, ISBN 978-2-7144-4828-6
- Le Testament d'Ariane, éd. Belfond, 2011
- Dans les pas d'Ariane éd. Belfond, 2011
- Serment d'automne, éd. Belfond, 2012, ISBN 978-2-7144-5242-9
- BM Blues, éd. Belfond, 2012, 105 pages
- D'eau et de feu, éd. Belfond, 2013
- Galop d’essai, éd. Belfond, 2014, ISBN 978-2-7144-5679-3
- La promesse de l'océan, éd. Belfond, 2014, ISBN 978-2714454126
- Un nouveau départ pour changer de vie, éditions Omnibus, 2014, ISBN 978-2-258-10609-3
