= Madeleine de Valmalète =

French classical pianist (1899–1999)

- Born: Madeleine Marthe Marie de Valmalete; July 28, 1899; 9th district of Marseilles
- Died: August 2, 1999 (aged 100)
- Education: National Conservatory of Music and Dance of Paris
- Occupations: Pianist, teacher

Madeleine (Marthe, Marie) de Valmalète, born July 28, 1899, in Montreuil (Seine-Saint-Denis, at the time Seine), died August 2, 1999, in Marseille, was a French classical pianist.

== Biography ==
A pupil of Joseph Morpain and Isidor Philipp, Madeleine obtained a 1st prize from the National Conservatory of Music in Paris at the age of 14. She won another first prize at the Isidor Philipp competition the following year. Writing to the latter to congratulate him on having developed such a talent, Saint-Saëns will say of her, after a performance of his Danse macabre: “virtuosity completely achieved, only the music remains”. One could not better describe her playing, as poetic as it is vigorous. After the First World War, she began an international career as a concert performer and played under the direction of Gabriel Pierné, Wilhelm Furtwangler, Arturo Toscanini, while she rubbed shoulders with Gabriel Fauré, Ravel, Jacques Thibaud, Ninon Vallin, Lotte Lehmann and Yehudi Menuhin.

In love with the South of France, she moved to Marseille in 1926 and founded a piano school there. From 1949 to 1961, invited by Alfred Cortot, she taught at the Normal School of Music in Paris. At the same time, in 1955 she created a competition for piano lovers and traveled all over France to preside over sessions in many cities. In 1962, she moved to Grenoble where she taught until 1974 at the Regional Conservatory of Grenoble, directed at the time by Éric-Paul Stekel, then by André Lodéon. She then returned to her beloved city of Marseilles where she continued to teach privately while giving a few recitals (Liszt Salle Gaveau in 1986, Chopin's 24 Studies...), because she retained an extraordinary dynamism and technique until a very advanced age. In 1992, she still wanted to “delight with Mozart” and played four of his Sonatas for a final recording (private edition).

The pianist Idil Biret, who met her in 1946 in Ankara, left a moving account of her elegant playing as well as the encouragement received during her musical training in Paris. She evokes her musical intelligence and her inspiration during recitals given each year in Paris at the Salle Gaveau.

== Discography ==
- Alexandre Aliabiev: Le Rossignol, arrangement by Franz Liszt (Polydor disc: Catalog B7084 No.90033)
- Frédéric Chopin and Franz Liszt, recital recorded in 1960
- Frédéric Chopin: Quatre Ballades (Label MV 01) recorded in 1977 (Pathé Marconi/EMI disc)
- Franz Liszt: Rhapsody No.11 (Polydor disc: Catalog B7082 No.90032)
- Maurice Ravel: Le Tombeau de Couperin, Pleyel piano (Polydor record: No.618577)
- Sergueï Rachmaninov: Barcarolle (Polydor disc: Catalog B27298 No.95175)
- Madeleine de Valmalète performs Chopin and Liszt, Steinway piano: Ecossaises No.1, No.2, No.3, Berceuse, Etudes op.10/3, op.10/8, op.25/6, Valses op.34, op.64, Il Sospiro, Ronde des Elves, Third Consolation, Tenth Rhapsody (Editions Côte d'Azur, sound recording Guy Magnant and Roger Paul)
- Madeleine de Valmalète performs Bach - Beethoven - Falla: Fantasy in C minor (Bach), Sonata op.31 n03 and Sonata op.57 (Beethoven), Ritual Dance of Fire (De Falla) (catalog no.: FS1002)
- Madeleine de Valmalète performs Bach - Beethoven - Mendelssohn - Chopin (new edition by Pierre Verany: PV83014)
- Madeleine de Valmalète performs Liszt (2nd volume): The Water Games at the Villa d'Este, Nocturne No.3, Ronde des Elves, Forgotten Waltz, Rhapsody No.10, Sonata in B minor, La Leggierezza, Sonnet 104 of Petrarch, A Sospiro, La Campanella (Catalogue FS.1001)
- Famous works by Liszt: Rêve d'amour, La Campanella, La Chasse, Leggierezza (Ducretet - Thompson, La Voix du Monde LAP 1012)
- Prestige of French Interpreters (Keyboard music in the eighteenth century): works by Couperin, Scarlatti, Du Phly
- Four great French pianists (Blanche Selva, Madeleine de Valmalète, Marcelle Meyer, Yvonne Lefébure) ASIN: B000027GTS
- French pianists published by Tahra in 2008
- Rediscovered Master, Arbiter 2005 (1928-1992, Mozart, Ravel, Liszt, Fauré, Debussy, Falla...) Diapason d'or

https://arbiterrecords.org/catalog/madeleine-de-valmalete-rediscovered-master/ [archive]

- Legendary French pianists, Monique Haas, Madeleine de Valmalète, Meloclassic label, Saint-Saëns Concerto n° 2 (with André Audoli), Mozart Concerto K271 Jeunehomme (with Eric-Paul Stekel)

== Educational books ==
- Seven pieces for easy piano on French popular melodies of the 18th century (Jolies bergères)
- Five excerpts from the collection "I already play..." (very easy pieces in large notes published by Editions Delrieu 8001J2ZR9M):

- No.08: Little lullaby and little march (M. de Valmalète)
- No.09: Walk in the forest (M. de Valmalète)
- No.10: The awakening at the farm (M. de Valmalète)
- No.11: I'm having fun (M. de Valmalète)
- No.12: With my songbook (M. de Valmalète)

== Posterity ==
Madeleine de Valmalète is the sister of the famous impresario Marcel de Valmalète, and co-founder with him of one of the largest artist agencies in Europe: the Bureau de Concerts de Valmalète. His office was taken over in 1957 by Marcel's daughter, Marie-Anne (Annie) de Valmalète, then by her grandson Hervé Corre de Valmalète. In homage to Madeleine de Valmalète, the city of Marseille gave her name to a street in its fourteenth arrondissement. The famous piano competition survived him until 2012.
