= Émile Decombes =

French pianist (1829–1912)

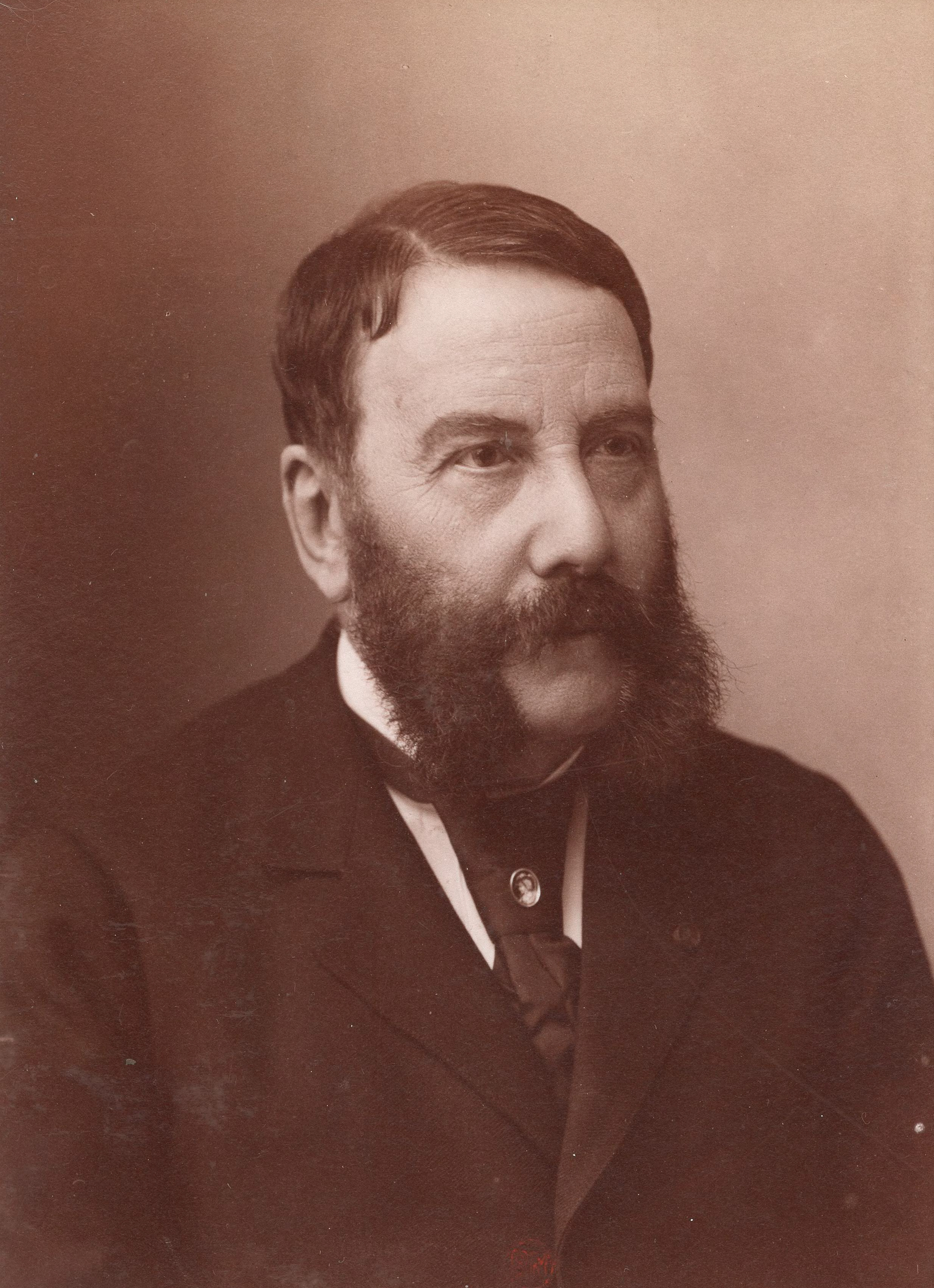

Émile Decombes (9 August 1829 – 5 May 1912) (also seen as Descombes) was a French pianist and teacher.

Decombes was born in Nîmes. Little is known about his life other than that he was one of the last pupils of Frédéric Chopin in Paris. He taught piano (the "classe préparatoire") at the Paris Conservatoire between 1875 and 1899, where his students included Alfred Cortot, Édouard Risler, Reynaldo Hahn, Gabriel Jaudoin, Joseph Morpain, Maurice Ravel, and Erik Satie (Decombes called him "the laziest student in the Conservatoire").

Besides his teaching, Decombes was also active as the editor of a series of piano arrangements of classical piano concertos called the École du Piano – Choix de Concertos des Maîtres. Premiers Solos, which appeared with the Parisian publisher Auguste O'Kelly from 1875. It had reached 50 volumes by 1888. The series was continued by O'Kelly's successor Mackar & Noël.

He was brother to the composer Achille Decombes (died 1893). Decombes died in Paris in 1912, aged 82.
