= Monique Haas =

French pianist (1909–1987)

Monique Haas (20 October 1909 – 9 June 1987) was a French pianist.

Born in Paris, she studied at the Conservatoire de Paris with Joseph Morpain and Lazare Lévy, earning a Premier Prix in 1927. She went on to study with Rudolf Serkin and Robert Casadesus. She toured the world, winning much praise for her performances of 20th-century classical music. Composer Francis Poulenc, himself an accomplished pianist, praised her as "the adorable Monique Haas who plays the piano ravishingly", and Henri Dutilleux described her as "a celebrated interpreter of the music of Ravel".

== Repertoire, recordings ==
Like many French pianists who grew up in the aftermath of the First World War, Haas's repertoire was characterised by an avoidance of Romantic composers and a significant representation of French music. Pieces by François Couperin and Jean-Philippe Rameau appeared regularly on her programmes, as well as those of Mozart and Haydn. Schumann was the significant exception to her neglect of romanticism, and she also included Chopin's etudes in her repertoire.

However, it was as a performer of twentieth-century French music that Haas is best remembered. Her recordings of Debussy include the comparatively neglected Douze Études, which won a Grand Prix du Disque, and the Préludes. She also recorded both of the Ravel concertos, the G major twice, as well as his complete solo piano music.

She was a noted interpreter of Béla Bartók, performing his Piano Concerto No. 3 only a few days after its world premiere by György Sándor. Another non-French composer whose works appealed to her was Paul Hindemith. She made a recording of his Suite for Piano and Strings, The Four Temperaments. She also recorded his Konzertmusik For Piano, Brass & Harp, with Hindemith himself conducting.

== Style ==
French pianists of Haas's generation were moving away from the facile, often brittle technique associated with Marguerite Long (frequently referred to as the "diggy-diggy-dee" style). Haas combined the cleanness and precision associated with the older school with a warmth of tone colour that reflected the influence of Alfred Cortot. Her unsentimental readings, especially of Debussy and Ravel, give a different view of their music, presenting them as both modern and as inheritors of the tradition of Couperin and the clavecinistes of the 18th century.

Contrasts can be found between her two recordings of the Ravel Concerto in G. The first, from 1948, makes much of the work's connections with the jazz idiom of the 1920s. The second, from 1965, is far more "Mozartean", reflecting Ravel's self-confessed debt to Mozart when he wrote it.

== Discography (selection) ==
- Ravel: The Piano Concertos. Orchestre national de l'ORTF cond. Paray. Deutsche Grammophon (CD)
- Ravel: Gaspard de la Nuit, Jeux D'Eau and Miroirs - Erato Presence EPR 15552, Eglise du Liban (Paris), July 1968
- Ravel: Oeuvres pour piano (Vol. 1) Erato Classics - 1968
- Claude Debussy: Piano Music (Complete), The Musical Heritage Society MHS 1536/41

== Private life ==
Haas was married to French-Romanian composer Marcel Mihalovici.
