= Roger Bourdin =

French operatic baritone (1900–1973)

Roger Bourdin (14 June 1900 – 14 September 1973) was a French baritone, particularly associated with the French repertory. His career was largely based in France. His daughter is Françoise Bourdin.

== Life and career ==
Born in the 19th arrondissement of Paris, Bourdin studied at the Conservatoire de Paris, where he was a pupil of André Gresse and Jacques Isnardon. He made his professional debut at the Opéra-Comique in 1922, as Lescaut in Manon. His debut at the Palais Garnier took place in 1942, in Henri Rabaud's Mârouf, savetier du Caire. The major part of his career was to be spent between these two theatres, where he created some 30 roles, among them the title role in Milhaud's Bolivar.

Bourdin seldom performed outside France, but did a few guest appearances at the Royal Opera House in London (including Pelléas to the Mélisande of Maggie Teyte in 1930), La Scala in Milan, and the Teatro Colón in Buenos Aires. He also sang in the first performance of surviving fragments of Chabrier's Vaucochard et fils Ier on 22 April 1941 at the Salle du Conservatoire with Germaine Cernay, conducted by Roger Désormière.

His most memorable roles were Clavaroche in André Messager's Fortunio, Metternich in Arthur Honegger and Jacques Ibert's L'Aiglon, Duparquet in Reynaldo Hahn's Ciboulette, Lheureux in Emmanuel Bondeville's Madame Bovary, and the lead in Darius Milhaud's Bolivar, but he also sang standard roles such as Valentin, Athanael, Onegin, and Sharpless. In all he sang an estimated 100 roles throughout his long career.

Bourdin was also active in operetta, and as a recitalist. He was the dedicatee of the 'Chanson à boire' (the third song of Ravel's Don Quichotte à Dulcinée), and of 'C'est le joli printemps', one of Poulenc's Chansons villageoises FP 117, of which he gave the premiere on 28 June 1943 in the Salle Gaveau.

After retiring from the stage in 1959, he became a teacher at the Paris Conservatory. He died in 1973 in Paris.

He can be heard in two complete recordings, Faust and Thais, opposite his wife, the soprano Géori Boué, as well as in Werther, and Ravel's L'heure espagnole. He also appeared in the film of Messager's operetta Coups de roulis, and Le Barbier de Séville as Don Bazile.

== Selected filmography ==
- Tossing Ship (Coups de roulis) (1932) - Kermao
- Miss Helyett (1933) - Landrin
- Martha (1936) - Lionel
- Serenade (1940) - Johann Michael Vogl

== Sources ==
- Alain Pâris, Dictionnaire des interprètes et de l'interpretation musicale au XX siècle (2 vols), Editions Robert Laffont (Bouquins, Paris 1982, 4th Edn. 1995, 5th Edn 2004). ISBN 2-221-06660-X
- Roland Mancini and Jean-Jacques Rouveroux, (orig. H. Rosenthal and J. Warrack, French edition), Guide de l’opéra, Les indispensables de la musique (Fayard, 1995). ISBN 2-213-59567-4
