= Mrs. Lucien Wang =

Singaporean pianist (1909–2007)

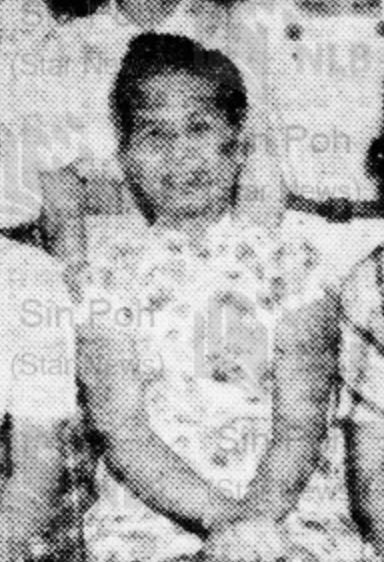
Wong in 1951.

Wong Maan Shing (Chinese: 黄晚成; 3 February 1909 – 2 June 2007), better known as Mrs. Lucien Wang, was a Guangzhou-born pianist, piano teacher and songwriter who settled in Singapore following the outbreak of the Second Sino-Japanese War. The first musician to receive the Public Service Star – Silver, several of her students became prominent local musicians, including concert pianists Ong Lip Tat, Toh Chee Hung and Lim Jing Jing.

== Early life and education ==
Wong was born to a wealthy family in Guangzhou, China, on 3 February 1909. From 1914 to 1922, she studied at the Kowloon True Light School, a boarding school founded by American missionaries Harriet Newell Noyes, where she received both her primary and secondary education. She was also given piano lessons by Noyes and Margaret Marr, the wife of a doctor who lived in her neighbourhood. She began attending the Canton Christian College, now known as Lingnan University, in 1923. There, she majored in Arts & Education. She later studied at the Beijing Conservatory. Her tutors there included a "Miss Hoveth", a Russian pianist. From 1926 to 1927, Wang taught Western history, World Geography, music and English at the Beijing Jin Shi School. She was also the discipline mistress of the school's Girls' Department.

In 1930, Wong left for Paris to study at the École Normale de Musique de Paris, a conservatory headed by Alfred Cortot. Her tutors there included both Cortot and pianist Joseph Morpain. She remained there for five years. After this, she went to study at the Trinity College of Music in London from 1935 to 1936.

== Career ==
After completing her studies overseas, Wong returned to China in 1936 to teach music at the Guangdong Provincial Girls' Normal School and the Canton Music Conservatory. She was Head of the Music Department at the former and a professor at the latter. Following the outbreak of the Second Sino-Japanese War, she fled to Singapore with her husband in 1939 and began teaching music at the Singapore campus of the Lingnan University and the Nanyang Girls' High School. During the Japanese occupation of Singapore, which lasted from 1942 to 1945, she began giving private piano lessons. In 1945, she penned the songs Huairen and Hu bugui mourning her husband, who had perished at the start of the occupation. In the same year, she joined the Singapore Music Teachers' Association. Wong organised a concert featuring her students, held at the Victoria Memorial Hall on 16 March 1946. The highlight of the concert was a performance of Wong's song To a Missing One, which was dedicated to her husband. Due to "public request", she organised a repeat concert for 23 March. She also published a collection of 16 songs in that year.

Wong began studying Western art at the Nanyang Academy of Fine Arts in 1950. In 1953, she returned to Paris to attend a class on 'advanced piano performance techniques' taught by Cortot. In 1953 and 1956, she attended his courses, which were held in Lausanne, Switzerland. She also took vocal training lessons in 1953 at the Scuola di Educazione Vocale di Manfredi Polverosi in Rome, Italy. In 1959, she took advanced piano lessons under Cortot and Guido Agosti at the Accademia Musicale Chigiana in Siena, Italy. In April 1963, critic "Thespis" of The Straits Times reported that Wong's school was then "well-attended" and that Wong herself was "well-known". In 1978, Wong organised a concert in celebration of the 100th anniversary of Cortot's birth.

Wong received the Public Service Star – Silver at the 1979 National Day Awards. She was the first musician to receive the award. By 1980, several of the songs she had written lyrics but not composed music for were harmonised by Chinese composer Hwang Yau-tai. Several of Wang's former students, friends and "admirers", including concert pianists Toh Chee Hung and Ong Lip Tat, organised and performed in two concerts at the Victoria Theatre on 4 and 5 January 1983 which were to "commemorate her 40 years' contribution to music education in Singapore." Composer Leong Yoon Pin, a friend of hers, contributed a piece titled 6B-0617, referring to Wang's address.

Wong's students included musicians Alwin Lee, Lim Shieh Yih, Cheung Mun Chit, Toh Chee Hung, Ong Lip Tat and Lim Jing Jing, as well as beautician Jane Kok, hotelier Yeoh Cheng Kung, piano teacher Chua Kah Pin (also known as Cai Jiabin) and Director of the Institute of Education Lau Wai Har. Ong later claimed that while he was studying in Europe, his professors "unanimously praised the groundwork that Madam Wong had given him." She claimed that her students generally remained with her for seven to eight years and that she "seldom [took] in new students." Many of her former students reportedly "insisted" that she teach their children. Wong served as the honorary advisor to the Heralds Choral Society and the honorary principal to the Young Voices Choir. She was also a member Singapore Music Association.

== Personal life and death ==
Wong married electrical engineer Lucien Wang Zuhui of Beijing in Guangzhou on 5 May 1937. The couple had fled to Singapore thinking that it would be a "safer place". Wang, who was then working as an engineer in Johor, was taken and killed by the Japanese at the start of the occupation of Singapore as part of Operation Sook Ching. Wong never remarried. In 1947, her mother Lee Wai Tek came to Singapore and began living together with her on Loke Yew Street until Lee's death in 1970. In April 1951, she was naturalised as a British subject. Shortly after the Singapore Citizenship Ordinance 1957 was commenced, Wong received her Singaporean citizenship. Wong preferred teaching, which she called "behind-the-scenes work", to performing.

Wong was sent to the East Coast Convalescent Centre by her godson in 1996. In 2000, she donated personal memorabilia to the Nanyang Academy of Fine Arts School of Dance, who then formed the Lucien Wang Archive. She lost her ability to speak in her later years. In May 2007, Wong was taken to the Singapore General Hospital due to fears that she had developed pneumonia from a recent cold. However, she was instead diagnosed with kidney cancer and her condition rapidly deteriorated. She died of the disease while in a coma at the hospital on 2 June 2007. Her body was cremated at the Mandai Crematorium and Columbarium. Following her death, six of her former students and friends formed a fund to "help poor students pursue music", which was reportedly her wish. Ong claimed that he would donate a portion of the proceeds from all of his future concerts to the fund.
