= L'île du rêve =

French opera

Hahn in 1906

L'île du rêve ("The Dream Island") is an 1898 French opera set in Polynesia. It was the first opera by Reynaldo Hahn. The idylle polynésienne in three acts has a libretto by André Alexandre and Georges Hartmann, which was adapted from Pierre Loti's semi-autobiographical 1880 novel Rarahu or Le Mariage de Loti set in Tahiti. It premiered on 23 March 1898 at the Opéra-Comique in Paris.

== Recording ==
Year	Cast	Conductor Orchestra	Label
2020	Hélène Guilmette, Cyrille Dubois, Anaïk Morel, Artavazd Sargsyan, Ludivine Gombert, Thomas Dolié	Hervé Niquet Münchner Rundfunkorchester	Palazzetto Bru Zane BZ 1042
