= Mozart (comédie musicale) =

Comédie musicale in three acts

Hahn in 1906

Mozart is a comédie musicale in three acts with music by Reynaldo Hahn and words by Sacha Guitry, a pastiche of the composer's early works to fit beside arias written for Yvonne Printemps (playing the title role as a breeches role). The story concerns the fictional adventures of Mozart on a visit to the French capital.

After the success of L'amour masqué, Sacha Guitry wanted to collaborate again with Messager, but the older composer declined. Guitry wrote to Hahn, on holiday in Cannes, who seized the opportunity with great joy, and the collaboration was excellent.

It was first performed at the Théâtre Édouard VII in Paris on 2 December 1925.

== Roles ==
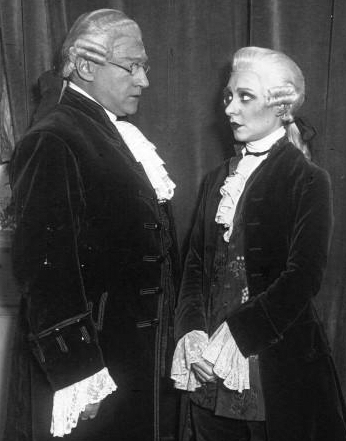
Sacha Guitry and Yvonne Printemps

| Role | Voice type | Premiere cast, 2 December 1925 (Conductor: Raoul Labis) |
|---|---|---|
| Grimm | spoken | Sacha Guitry |
| Marquis de Chambreuil | spoken | René Maupré |
| Vestris | spoken | Gaston Gerlys |
| Mozart | soprano | Yvonne Printemps |
| Mme d'Épinay | mezzo-soprano | Germaine Gallois |
| La Guimard | spoken | Marthe Lenclud |
| Mlle de Saint-Pons | spoken | Edith Merannes |
| Louise | soprano | Madeleine Lebergy |
| Grimaud | tenor | Léonce Dupré |

== Synopsis ==
=== Act 1 ===
It is 1778, and in the salon of Madame d'Épinay, the mistress of the house tries to persuade her godchild Marie-Anne de Saint-Pons of the advantages of a marriage to the Marquis de Chambreuil. The Marquis enters and invites Marie-Anne to play the harpsichord; she dared not, as the instrument was played by the young Mozart on his first time in Paris. The Baron Grimm and La Guimard, the famous dancer and, it appears, intimate with Grimm, join the party and conversation turns to the visit to Paris of the young Wolfgang Amadeus Mozart when he was a child prodigy. Mme d'Épinay owns the picture of the boy Mozart by Carmontelle.

The servants Louise and Grimaud are also present. Although he has sent no news since his last visit, the subject of conversation now makes a surprise entrance. The child prodigy, now 22 and a famous musician, remains sensitive and shy, but tells the company of his journey and having read Molière's Dom Juan on the coach from Strasbourg to Paris. He is warmly welcomed and, to thank his hosts, he plays the harpsichord, singing "Il faut que tu m'aimes Paris!".

=== Act 2 ===
A few days later – Mozart is working at the keyboard at Madame d'Épinay's house when her young servant Louise brings him a letter. Mozart has seduced many attractive women during his visit but is unsure who he should choose; the hostess suggests the dancer La Guimard. Mozart is to compose several pieces in Paris, including Les petits riens, which La Guimard and Vestris rehearse, while the composer successfully flirts with Guimard. Mozart then opens the letter he received: it is from his love interest in Mannheim, Aloysia Weber.

=== Act 3 ===
Louise's fiancé reproaches her for having made eyes at Mozart. The Marquis de Chambreuil is furious too as the composer has also been flirting with Marie-Anne (whom he called by an intimate nickname, Nannerl), and sent her a letter.

Baron Grimm tries to calm everyone, pointing out that Mozart will have to leave Paris soon. It then emerges that Grimm had written to Mozart's father to bring forward his departure. Grimm explains that the young man has been frittering away his time in France, his fancy alighting on one woman after another, and it would be better for everyone if he left for Germany. Mozart submits reluctantly and sadly to this decision and bids a tender farewell to the four women, and to Paris.

== Recordings ==
- Orchestre des Concerts Français, conductor: André Jouve
  - Principal singers: Annie Rozanne, Annie Ducaux, Maurice Escande
  - Recording date: 15 and 16 June 1955
  - Label: EMI, CZS 5 68286 2 (CD) (released with extracts from Ciboulette)
- Orchestre Radio-Lyrique, conductor: Pierre-Michel Le Conte
  - Principal singers: Géori Boué, Huguette Hennetier, Roger Bourdin
  - Recording date: 17 June 1959
  - Label: Musidisc / INA edition / Gaite Lyrique 201372 (CD)

Yvonne Printemps recorded excerpts from the piece in July 1929, including "C'est la saison d'amour" and "Je t'aime" (available on La Saison d'Amour, Pearl CD) and "Depuis ton départ, mon amour" and "Alors, adieu, donc, mon amour" (available on Yvonne Printemps: Arias and Songs EMI CD).
