= Le Bal de Béatrice d'Este =

Orchestral suite

Le Bal de Béatrice d'Este is a seven-movement suite for chamber ensemble by Reynaldo Hahn, first performed in 1905 in Paris.

== History ==
The composer Reynaldo Hahn – born in Venezuela and long resident in Paris, though not yet, in 1905, a French national – was devoted to France, and interested in its historical culture. In his mélodies he made several settings of words by French poets of medieval and Renaissance times, and sometimes composed in a style evoking their eras. For Le Bal de Béatrice d'Este, however, he turned to Italian history. Beatrice d'Este was the wife of the 15th-century Duke of Milan, Ludovico ("Il Moro") Sforza. She presided over a glittering court, which included Donato Bramante, Leonardo da Vinci and other leading artists. Hahn based his suite on archaic dance measures, to portray a grand ball at the ducal palace. The suite is dedicated to Camille Saint-Saëns, with whom Hahn had studied in the 1890s.

The work was first performed privately, at the Paris house of Madeleine Lemaire on 12 April 1905; the piano part was played by the composer. The public premiere was at a concert at the Théâtre Nouveau given by the Société Moderne pour Instruments à Vent (Modern Society for Wind Instruments) on 21 May 1905. The work attracted more press attention when it featured in a high-society soirée musicale given by the Princesse de Polignac at her Paris town house in April 1907.

The British premiere was on 11 September 1913 at the Promenade Concerts at the Queen's Hall.

== Score ==
The suite is in seven movements, scored for an instrumental ensemble comprising two flutes, one oboe, two clarinets, two bassoons, two horns, one trumpet, one piano, two harps, timpani and percussion.

1. Entrée pour Ludovic le More. The opening, grand flourish, in E-flat major, introduced by a harp glissando, is a dialogue between a group of four instruments and the rest of the ensemble.
2. Lesquercade. This movement, mainly in the key of C-flat major is a variant of a pavan. It is played by the woodwind and first horn, accompanied by arabesques on the harps and piano.
3. Romanesque. The outer sections feature the solo flute, with a winding melody in C major. The middle section comprises a series of contrasting modulations.
4. Iberienne. By contrast with the elegance of the Romanesque the Iberienne is percussive and strongly rhymical. The harps and piano introduce the movement with alternating chords, before the trumpet introduces a C minor theme with an ambiguous beat that blurs two-time and three-time. The central section has a lyrical theme in C major.
5. Léda et l'oiseau. Subtitled "Intermède Léonardesque", the movement alludes to a celebrated painting of Leda and the swan, lost since the end of the seventeenth century. Harp arpeggios are followed by an arabesque figure for the winds and then a quiet arioso for solo flute.
6. Courante. The movement starts with a forthright melody for the concerted winds. The central trio section is a canon for the oboe and horn, echoed by the clarinet and.bassoon.
7. Salut final au Duc de Milan. The last movement is a shortened repeat of the opening Entrée.

An arrangement of the suite for piano four hands by André Gedalge was published circa 1911.

== Recordings ==
Hahn conducted a recording of the suite with an anonymous Parisian ensemble in 1935, released on 78 rpm discs by the Compagnie Française du Gramophone, and reissued on CD in 1997 and 2004.

WorldCat (November 2020) lists subsequent recordings conducted by Nicolas Chalvin, Jared Chase, Ronald Corp, Jean-Pierre Jacquillat, Janos Komives, Eric Laprade, Jean Maillot, Steven Richman, Timothy Salzman and Jeroen Weierink.
