= Georges Hartmann =

French writer and librettist (1843–1900)

Romain-Jean-François "Georges" Hartmann (15 May 1843 – 22 April 1900) was a French music publisher, dramatist and opera librettist (publishing under the pen name Henri Grémont).

Born in Paris, he was the son of Jean Hartmann (1804–1880), a German national born in Neustadt, Bavaria, who acted as the French distributor for the music publisher B. Schott's Söhne. In 1868, Georges Hartmann became a music publisher, publishing, among others, works by Georges Bizet, Jules Massenet, Édouard Lalo, Benjamin Godard, César Franck, and Ernest Reyer. In May 1891, his publishing house failed and he was forced to sell it to Henri Heugel, the intermediary being Paul-Émile Chevalier, an employee of Hartmann's who was a nephew of Heugel. Through merger in 1980, Heugel itself became part of Éditions Alphonse Leduc publishing empire.

Hartmann's own librettos include those to Massenet's operas Hérodiade (1881) and Werther (1892), Charles Silver's Château Brillon (1892), André Messager's Madame Chrysanthème (1893) and Reynaldo Hahn's L'Île du rêve (1898).
