= Augustine-Malvina Blanchecotte =

French poet

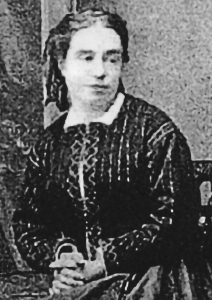
- Born: Augustine-Malvina Souville; 30 November 1830; Paris, France
- Died: 21 February 1897 (aged 66); Paris, France
- Occupation: Poet

Augustine-Malvina Blanchecotte or Malvina Blanchecotte (1830–1897) was a French poet and writer.

Blanchecotte was born on 30 November 1830 in Paris, France. She earned a living as a seamstress and a teacher. Her first work of poetry, Rêves et Réalités, was published in 1855. Subsequent volumes included Nouvelles poésies in 1861; Impressions d’une femme : pensées, sentiments, portraits in 1868; Les militantes, poésies in 1871, Tablettes d’une femme pendant la Commune in 1872; and Le long de la vie, nouvelles impressions d’une femme in 1875.

In 1888 her poem Les larmes was set to music by Pyotr Ilyich Tchaikovsky.

Blanchecotte died on 21 February 1897 in Paris.
