= Géori Boué =

French opera singer

Georgette "Géori" Boué'
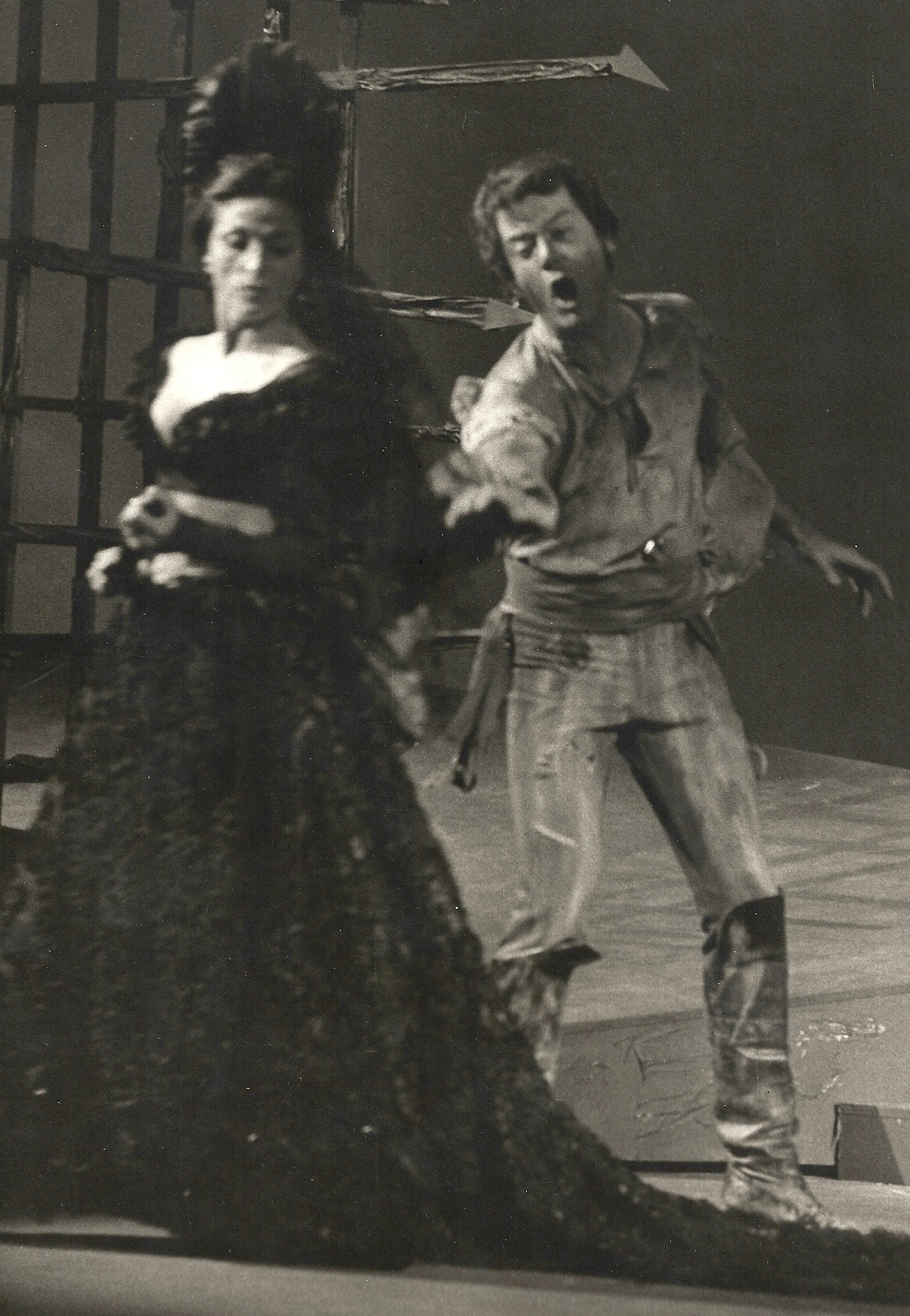
- Géori Boué in Carmen in 1969.

Background information
- Born: 16 October 1918; Toulouse, France
- Died: 5 January 2017 (aged 98) Paris, France

Georgette "Géori" Boué (16 October 1918 – 5 January 2017) was a French soprano, particularly associated with the French repertory, especially Marguérite, Thais and Salomé (Massenet). She was born in Toulouse. Following her career in France and other European centres, she was a teacher and "perceptive observer of the French operatic scene".

== Life and career ==
Boué studied at the Music Conservatory of her native city (solfege, piano, harp, voice) with Claude Jean. After winning a first prize in a vocal competition, she made her debut at the Capitole de Toulouse in 1934, aged only 16, in small roles, such as Urbain in Les Huguenots, Siebel in Faust, Stéfano in Roméo et Juliette, quickly followed by bigger parts such as the lead role in Mireille and Micaëla in Carmen.

She made her Paris debut at the Opéra-Comique in 1939, as Mimi in La Bohème (also singing in the 1,000th performance of the work at the Salle Favart on 3 May 1951), and other roles there included: Lakmé, Manon (singing in the 2,000th performance on 18 January 1952), and Ciboulette (first performance at the Opéra-Comique). Her debut at the Palais Garnier took place in 1942, as Marguerite in Faust, and she went on to sing roles such as Juliette in Roméo et Juliette, Thais, Salomé in Hérodiade, Louise, Gilda in Rigoletto, Violetta in La traviata, Desdémone in Otello, Tosca, Madama Butterfly, Tatiana in Eugene Onegin, etc.

On the international scene, she appeared at the Liceu in Barcelona, at La Scala in Milan, as Mélisande under Victor De Sabata in 1949, Mexico, Rio de Janeiro, Chicago, and the Bolshoi in Moscow, as Tatyana, in 1956. Her dislike of travel and wish to be with her family meant that she did not sing more widely on the international stage. She also sang in operettas such as La belle Hélène and The Merry Widow and in contemporary operas such as Le fou and Les Adieux by Marcel Landowski and Colombe by Jean-Michel Damase.

She was married to French baritone Roger Bourdin in May 1944, with whom she had two daughters, one of whom is Françoise Bourdin. With Bourdin she can be heard in three recordings, Faust under Thomas Beecham, Thaïs, and a radio recording of Véronique. Boué appeared in the title role of the movie La Malibran, by Sacha Guitry, in 1943, assisted by her ability to accompany herself while singing. She retired from the stage in 1970. As well as Faust and Thaïs her recorded legacy includes L'Aiglon, Angélique, Paganini, Les contes d'Hoffmann, L'heure espagnole and Mozart.

Critics noted Boué's "bright timbre, exquisite diction, considerable interpretative intelligence and impressive gifts as an actress". She died in January 2017 at the age of 98.
