= Le marchand de Venise =

1935 opera by Reynaldo Hahn

Hahn in 1906

Le Marchand de Venise (The Merchant of Venice) is a French opera in three acts by Reynaldo Hahn. The libretto was by Miguel Zamacoïs, after Shakespeare's The Merchant of Venice. Hahn first started working on the opera during the First World War, imagining it as a 'Mozartian' work, with the role of Portia written specifically with the soprano Mary Garden in mind.

The opera was first performed at the Paris Opéra, on 25 March 1935. It was revived at the Opéra on 18 November 1949 and again on 19 February 1950, and in 1979 at the Opéra-Comique under Manuel Rosenthal. The United States premiere was by the Portland Opera on 4 November 1996 under French conductor Marc Trautmann. In May 2017 the opera received its German premiere at the Theater Bielefeld in a production by Klaus Hemmerle conducted by Pawel Poplawski.

== Principal roles ==
| Role | Voice type | Premiere cast, 25 March 1935 (Conductor: Philippe Gaubert) |
|---|---|---|
| Graziano | tenor | Henri Le Clézio |
| Lorenzo | tenor | Edmond Chastenet |
| Jessica | soprano | Odette Renaudin |
| Shylock | bass | André Pernet |
| Bassanio | baritone | Martial Singher |
| Antonio | bass | Paul Cabanel |
| Portia | soprano | Fanny Heldy |
| Nérissa | mezzo-soprano | Renée Mahé |
| Prince of Morocco | bass | Henri-Bertrand Etcheverry |
| Prince of Aragon | tenor | Edmond Rambaud |
| Doge | bass | Armand Narçon |
| Tubal | bass | Louis Morot |
| Governess | mezzo-soprano | Andrée Marilliet |
| Salarino | tenor | Jean DeLeu |
| Servant | soprano | E. Vial |
| Servant | bass | Jules Forest |
Chorus: Maskers, Venetians, Jews etc.

== Synopsis ==
The story follows Shakespeare's play, The Merchant of Venice, but with some transpositions of the text. The comic figures of Lancelot Gobbo and Old Gobbo are absent.

== Recordings ==
Some of the original role creators have left recordings of arias: (Hahn: Recordings 1908-35 with Martial Singher, Andre Pernet, Fanny Heldy, on Pearl CD 1165392).
