= Pierre-Michel Le Conte =

French conductor (1921–2000)

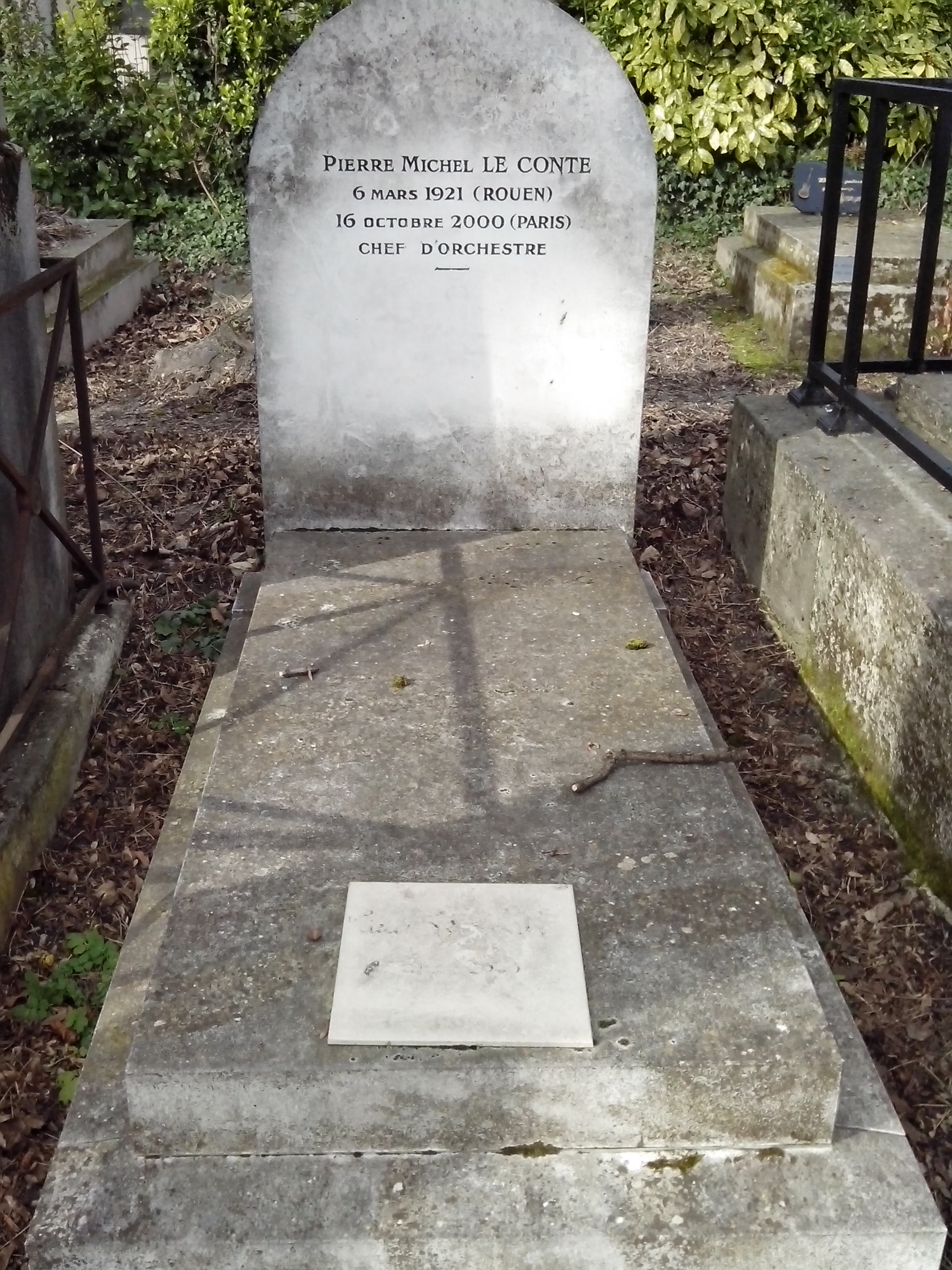
Grave at Père Lachaise Cemetery

Pierre-Michel Le Conte (6 March 1921 – 16 October 2000) was a French conductor.

== Biography ==
Born in Rouen, at age 5 Le Conte entered the Maîtrise Saint-Evode de la cathédrale de Rouen. Then he began piano and violin studies at the École normale de musique de Paris. He finished his studies at the Conservatoire de Paris with a first prize for bassoon in 1944, then a first prize in orchestral conducting, in 1947.

He successively held the positions of music director at Radio Nice, then at Radio Toulouse from 1949 to 1950, before settling in Paris, where he occasionally directed the orchestre de la Société des concerts du Conservatoire. But it was at the Radiodiffusion-Télévision Française then at the Office de Radiodiffusion Télévision Française that he made most of his career, conducting the Orchestre National de France, the chamber orchestra and overall the Orchestre philharmonique de Radio France (specializing in lyrical repertoire), of which he became permanent conductor from 1960 to 1973 after having been assistant to his first conductor, Eugène Bigot.

An academic at the Conservatoire de Paris, he was also director of the 7th arrondissement of Paris conservatory from 1981.

Le Conte died in Paris. He is buried at cimetière du Père-Lachaise (28th division).
