= List of French films of 1920 =

A list of films produced in France in 1920:

| Title | Director | Cast | Genre | Notes |
|---|---|---|---|---|
| L'ami des montagnes | Guy Du Fresnay | | | |
| Au-delà des lois humaines | Gaston Roudès, Marcel Dumont | Rachel Devirys, Germaine Sablon, Georges Saillard, Maurice Schutz | Drama | |
| Barrabas | Louis Feuillade | Fernand Herrmann, Édouard Mathé, Gaston Michel, Georges Biscot, Blanche Montel | Crime thriller | |
| La Belle dame sans merci | directed Germaine Dulac | | | |
| The Call of the Blood | Louis Mercanton | Ivor Novello, Phyllis Neilson-Terry | Drama | |
| Le Carnaval des vérités | Marcel L'Herbier | Suzanne Desprès, Paul Capellani | Drama | |
| Champi-Tortu | Jacques de Baroncelli | Pierre Alcover, René Alexandre, Paul Duc, Henri Janvier | Drama | |
| Les chères images | André Hugon | Jean Angelo, Eugenie Nau | | |
| Le chevalier de Gaby | Charles Burguet | Gaby Morlay | Comedy | |
| Les cinq gentlemen maudits | Luitz Morat, Pierre Régnier | | | |
| Colomba | Jean Hervé | | | |
| De la coupe aux lèvres | Guy Du Fresnay | Marguerite Madys, Paul Capellani | Romantic Drama | |
| La dette | Gaston Roudès | | | |
| Les deux gamines | Louis Feuillade | Rene Poyen, Gaston Michel | Comedy drama | |
| L'essor | Charles Burguet | Suzanne Grandais, Berthe Jalabert | Romance | |
| Être aimé pour soi-même | Robert Péguy | Paul Amiot, Henri Collen, Catherine Jordan, Jeanne Maguenat | Drama | |
| Face à l'Océan | René Leprince | Adrienne Duriez, Madeleine Erickson, Louise Kermarech, Christiane Delval | | |
| La Fête espagnole | directed by Germaine Dulac | Ève Francis, Jean Toulout | | |
| Fille du peuple | Camille de Morlhon | Suzanne Herval, Charles de Rochefort, Jean Peyrière | | |
| Flipotte | Jacques de Baroncelli | Gabriel Signoret, Suzanne Bianchetti, Andrée Brabant, Jeanne Cheirel | | Based on a Henry Kistemaeckers novel |
| La folie du doute | René Leprince | Yvonne Duprez, Jean Dax | | |
| Gosse de riche | Charles Burguet | | | |
| Le grillon du foyer | Jean Manoussi | | | |
| L'Homme du large | Marcel L'Herbier | Jaque Catelain, Roger Karl, Charles Boyer, Philippe Hériat | | Honoré de Balzac story |
| L'Homme qui vendit son âme au diable | Pierre Caron | Charles Dullin, Jean-David Évremond, Yvonne Fursey, Gladys Rolland | | |
| Irène | Marcel Dumont | | | |
| Jacques Landauze | André Hugon | Marguerite de Barbieux, Jean Toulout | Drama | |
| Malencontre | | | | |
| Le Menage Moderne Du Madame Butterfly | Bernard Natan | | Pornographic | First known bisexual film |
| Miss Rovel | Jean Kemm | | | |
| La montée vers l'Acropole | René Le Somptier | Andre Nox, France Dhélia | Drama | |
| Narayana | Léon Poirier | Laurence Myrga, Edmond Van Daële | | |
| Nine ou la jeune fille au masque | Robert Péguy | Paul Amiot, Renée Carl, Henri Collen, Gina Relly | Short comedy | |
| Le penseur | Léon Poirier | Andre Nox, Marguerite Madys | | |
| Le piège de l'amour | Alexandre Ryder | Henri Baudin, Jane Dolys, Huguette Duflos | Crime | |
| La rafale | Jacques de Baroncelli | Fannie Ward, among others | | |
| La Reincarnation de Serge Renaudier | Julien Duvivier | Andre Fiot, Andree Reynis | Drama | |
| Le Secret d'Alta Rocca | André Liabel | Henri Bosc, Jacqueline Arly | | |
| Le Secret de Rosette Lambert | Raymond Bernard | Rose Lambert, Sylvia Grey | | |
| Le Secret du Lone Star | Jacques de Baroncelli | Fannie Ward, Gabriel Signoret | | |
| Tout se paie | Henry Houry | | | |
| Tristan et Yseult | Maurice Mariaud | | | |
| Tue-la-Mort | René Navarre | | | |
| La vengeance de Malet | Marc Gérard | | | |
| Vers l' argent | René Plaissetty | | | |
| Visages voilés, âmes closes | Henry Roussell | | | |
| Wedding Night | Marcel Simon | Yvonne Chazel, Armand Lurville, Fernand Rivers | Comedy | |
| William Baluchet, roi des détectives | Gaston Leprieur | | | |
| Zon | Robert Boudrioz | | | |

== See also ==
- 1920 in France
