= Emile Boreo =

American actor (1885–1951)

Emile Boreo (1885 in Poland – 27 July 1951 in New York City, US) was an American actor in theater and film. He became known in the 1930s for his roles in films such as The Street Singer and The Lady Vanishes.

== Life ==
Emile Boreo, born in Poland in 1885, achieved success as the Limehouse Actor on Broadway in the 1920s, portraying Pagliacci in revues like Chauve Souris and Parade of the Wooden Soldiers alongside Nelson Keys. He worked as a comedian and singer in vaudeville, captivating club audiences with artistic song evenings. In the spring of 1940, he performed very successfully alongside Lee J. Cobb, Lenore Ulric, Katherine Locke, and Arnold Moss in numerous productions of Ernest Hemingway's play The Fifth Column at the Broadhurst Theatre in New York City.

In England, Emile Boreo appeared in only a few films as an actor. In 1937, under the direction of Jean de Marguenat, he starred in the musical The Street Singer portraying Luigi alongside actors such as Arthur Tracy, Arthur Riscoe, Margaret Lockwood, and Hugh Wakefield. A year later, director Alfred Hitchcock cast him in his successful crime comedy The Lady Vanishes, where he once again acted alongside Margaret Lockwood. In this film, he played Boris, a stressed hotel manager who finds himself faced with the task of accommodating international guests from a train trapped by an avalanche in his already overcrowded hotel.

In Edgar G. Ulmer's musical drama Carnegie Hall, Emile Boreo was seen in 1947 in his final role on screen. He died on July 27, 1951, in New York City.

== Filmography ==
Year	Title	Role	Notes
1937	The Street Singer	Luigi	
1937	Music-Hall Cavalcade: Stars of Yesterday and Today		TV Movie
1938	The Lady Vanishes	Hotel Manager	
1947	Carnegie Hall	Henry	

== Literature ==
- Emile Boreo. In: Gene Brown: The New York Times Encyclopedia of Film: 1941–1946, Times Books, 1984, S. 1.
