= Germaine Sablon =

French singer, film actress and WWII French Resistance fighter

- Born: 19 July 1899; Le Perreux-sur-Marne, Val-de-Marne, Île-de-France, France
- Died: 17 April 1985 (aged 85); Saint-Raphaël, Var, Provence-Alpes-Côte d'Azur
- Occupation: actress
- Years active: 1920–1956

Germaine Sablon (19 July 1899 at Le Perreux-sur-Marne – 17 April 1985 at Saint-Raphael) was a French singer, film actress and a WWII French Resistance fighter.

She starred in some 15 films between 1920 and 1956.

== Biography ==
Germaine Sablon was born into an artistic family: daughter of Charles Sablon (composer born in 1871), sister of André Sablon (composer), of Jean Sablon (popular singer) and of Marcel Sablon, (director of the Monte Carlo Ballet) and later, she became the aunt of actor Jacques Sablon.

Germaine Sablon began a career as an operetta singer in 1915. From 1919, she played in silent films.

Married twice, in 1918 to Maurice Bloch, then in 1921 to Charles Legrand, she was for many years the companion of the writer Joseph Kessel.

She interrupted her career in the 1920s to give birth to two sons.

As early as 1932, she started recording her songs. At the same time, her career as an actress underwent a considerable turning point with the advent of talking films.

With the Fall of France in 1940, she left Paris for Saint-Raphaël. She stayed with Joseph Kessel (with whom, as noted, she would start a long relationship) and his nephew Maurice Druon. Along with André Girard and André Gillois, she joined the Resistance fight against the Nazi occupier.

In 1941 she took refuge in Switzerland, then in London in 1943.

On 30 May 1943, she sang for the first time the Chant des Partisans and recorded it for Alberto Cavalcanti's propaganda film Three Songs about Resistance.

Involved with Free France, in the later part of the war she was a nurse in the Hadfield-Spears Ambulance Unit and followed the 1st Free French Division in Italy and France.

From 1945 to 1955, she recorded thirty songs.

Germaine Sablon was a Chevalier (Knight) of the Legion of Honor, and a holder of the Croix de guerre 1939–1945.

== Songs ==
- Vous ne savez pas (duet with Jean Sablon)
- Mon légionnaire
- Mon homme
- La petite île
- Partance
- Le Chant des partisans
- Paris est à nous

== Filmography ==
- 1920: In La Double Existence du docteur Morart by Jacques Grétillat, she played Yvonne Saurel
- 1920: In Au-delà des lois humaines by Gaston Roudès and Marcel Dumont, she played Lise Duclary
- 1920: In L'Envol by Pierre Hot (short film)
- 1920: In Le Mont maudit by Paul Garbagni (short film), she played Pearl Benton
- 1921: In Sans fortune by Geo Kessler
- 1931: In A Telephone Call by Georges Lacombe, she played Manette
- 1931: In Tante Aurélie by Henri Diamant-Berger (short film)
- 1932: In Le truc du Brésilien by Alberto Cavalcanti
- 1932: In Chassé-croisé by Maurice Diamant-Berger (short film)
- 1932: In Plaisirs défendus by Alberto Cavalcanti (short film)
- 1934: In Paris-Deauville by Jean Delannoy, she played Paulette de Sempé
- 1934: In Sidonie Panache by Henry Wulschleger, she played Séraphine
- 1934: In Surprise partie by Marc Didier (short film)
- 1936: In La Vie parisienne (Parisian Life) by Robert Siodmak, she played The Singer
- 1936: In La Rose effeuillée by Georges Pallu
- 1936: In La Terre qui meurt, by Jean Vallée, she played Félicité
- 1937: In Au soleil de Marseille (In the Sun of Marseille) by Pierre-Jean Ducis, she played Ginette
- 1937: In If You Return by Jacques Daniel-Norman she played Irène Delly
- 1941: In Sixième étage by Maurice Cloche, she played The Woman in Grey
- 1943: In Pourquoi nous combattons (Why We Fight)
- 1955: In Tides of Passion by Jean Stelli, she played Mme Goudart
