= Jean Sablon =

French singer, songwriter, composer and actor (1906–1994)

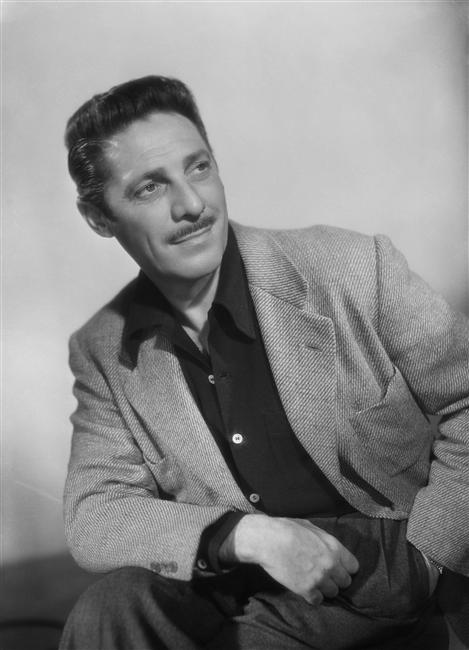
- Sablon in 1939
- Born: Jean Georges Sablon; 25 March 1906; Nogent-sur-Marne, France
- Died: 24 February 1994 (aged 87); Cannes, France
- Education: Lycée Charlemagne
- Occupations: Singer, songwriter, actor
- Years active: 1923–84
- Known for: J'attendrai, C'est si bon, La Vie en rose, Les feuilles mortes, Sur le Pont d'Avignon, Melodie d'Amour, Syracuse, Je tire ma révérence, Vous qui passez sans me voir, C'est le printemps, Ce petit chemin
- Style: Chanson

Jean Sablon (Nogent-sur-Marne 25 March 1906 – Cannes 24 February 1994) was a French singer, songwriter, composer and actor. He was one of the first French singers to immerse himself in jazz. The man behind several songs by big French and American names, he was the first to use a microphone on a French stage in 1936. Star of vinyl records and the radio, he left France in 1937 to take a contract with NBC in the United States. His radio and later televised shows made him a huge star in America. Henceforth the most international of French singers among his contemporaries, he became an ambassador of French songwriting and dedicated his career to touring internationally, occasionally returning to France to appear on stage. His sixty-one year career came to an end in 1984.

== Biography ==
Sablon was born in Nogent-sur-Marne, the son of a composer, with brothers and sisters who had successful careers of their own in musical entertainment.

A pupil at the Lycée Charlemagne in Paris, Jean Sablon dropped out, intending to study at the Conservatory of Paris. Too late, however, to apply for his year, he concentrated immediately on a professional singing career. He made his debut at the age of seventeen in an operetta in Paris. It was in operettas that he came to share the stage in 1923 first with Jean Gabin in La Dame en Décolleté and then with Charles Boyer and Falconetti in Simili in 1925.

1927 found him appearing in the review of Au Temps de Gastounet (written by Rip) with Jacqueline Delubac. It was Paul Colin who created the first billboard for the young singer. After appearing in the operetta "Lulu" with Fernand Gravey, he embarked on a transatlantic journey to Rio de Janeiro in the company of Georges Milton and Alice Cocéa for the inauguration of the Copacabana Palace (1928). In 1929, Jean Sablon recorded his first demo record for Columbia with Georges Van Parys, as well as sharing the stage in the operetta Vive Leroy with Arletty, Dranem and Jacqueline Delubac and then Music Hall with Damia and Germaine Rouer. The following year, he appeared in Cocktail 328 with Damia again, as well as making his first film, Chacun sa Chance, the same year, with Jean Gabin who also made his film debut with him.

Henri Diamant-Berger approached Sablon in 1931 for the making of Tante Aurélie alongside his sister Germaine Sablon. That year, he was back on stage in La Revue Argentine, then Parade de Femmes with Carlos Gardel. It was in 1931 that he met Mireille, whose song Couchés dans le foin became a great success, the introduction being made by the editor Raoul Breton.

In another important encounter in 1931, Jean discovered the guitarist Django Reinhardt in La Boîte à Matelots.

On stage, Jean appeared with Mistinguett at the Casino de Paris in Paris qui brille.

1932 was a year rich in recordings for the record company Columbia. He was accompanied by Don Barretto, sang with his sister Germaine and was accompanied by the pianist and composer Mireille while interpreting songs from the operetta Un Mois de Vacances. At the same time, Mireille and Jean Nohain wrote Couchés dans le foin. That song, first performed by Pills et Tabet became a huge hit for them and later for Jean Sablon. In 1933, Jean was reunited with Reda Caire in the operetta 19 ans, accompanied by Django Reinhardt, with whom he shared success in the recording studio at Columbia, who had initially been reluctant to take the costly risk of engaging Reinhardt who, as a guitarist, couldn't read music. Sablon thus became the first singer to have recorded with Django. He then embarked on another journey to America, Hollywood this time, with Mireille at the invitation of Ramon Novarro, famous for Ben Hur on the big screen. In Los Angeles, he gave a concert in front of a panoply of stars. Back in Paris, he created Ce Petit Chemin.

It was in 1934 that Jean Cocteau encouraged Sablon to initiate a tour de chant (one man show), accompanied on the piano by Jean Wiener and Clément Doucet, at the Rococo, an establishment that belonged to Louis Moysès, founder and owner of the cabaret Le Bœuf sur le toit. The Monseigneur Restaurant in Jermyn Street, London invited him to perform in cararet there. His success on the BBC radio with his trio (Django Reinhardt, André Ekyan and Alec Siniavine) was so considerable that the transmissions were often repeated and the programs of the radio station modified. Back in France, he appeared on the stage in Nice with Django Reinhardt and Joséphine Baker. He was also instrumental in the reopening of the venue Le Bœuf sur le toit and gave recitals at the Rex and the Folies-Bergère in "Femmes en Folie". In 1935, he performed the song "These Foolish Things" at Le Bœuf sur le toit and was on the stage with Pierre Dac in Pirouette 35.

In 1936, the film Le petit chemin reunited Sablon with Mireille. Their interpretation of "Ce petit chemin" represented of sorts a preview of what was to come in video clips decades later. Sablon became the presenter of the radio show Cadum Variétés, on which he also sang. Guests included Maurice Chevalier, Damia, Fernandel, Mistinguett, Yvette Guilbert, Albert Préjean, Henri Garat to name a few. He was also given a radio show, "The Magic Key". He then found himself at the Café de Paris in London, returning to France for "Le Chant des Tropiques" at the Théâtre de Paris. It was at the Théâtre Mogador and then at Bobino that he created a scandal by using a microphone, the first to do so in France. It became Sablon's kind of brand image.

In 1937, he won the Grand Prix du Disque for the song "Vous qui passez sans me voir", created by him and written for him by Charles Trenet, Johnny Hess and Paul Misraki. That same year, contracted by the producers of The Magic Key, thanks to his success in France, he left for New York, engaged at the NBC studios of Radio City Hall. It was there that he made a few recordings in English, with celebrities such as Cole Porter and George Gershwin lending him their material, respectively "In the Still of the Night" and "Love walked In".

In Hollywood, Sablon was contracted to star in "The Story of Irene and Vernon Castle" with Fred Astaire and Ginger Rogers. Due to production disagreements, he demanded the withdrawal of scenes in which he starred. The final version conserves merely his interpretation of the song "Darktown Strutters Ball". In the movie capital, he appeared at the Trocadero. He also presented and sang his songs on the radio show Hollywood Hotel on which he invited numerous big stars. In January 1939, he was in Montreal, creating a swing version of Sur Le Pont d'Avignon which would go on to have a huge success. It was there that he met La Bolduc, whose technique of turlutage as well as her earthy songs impressed him greatly. It was thanks to Sablon that Charles Trenet and La Bolduc were introduced. In the 1940s, he animated the "Show Jean Sablon" on the Columbia Broadcasting System (CBS) radio and was accompanied by the American accordionist and songwriter John Serry Sr, with Toots Camarata as musical arranger. He returned to Paris to appear on the stage of the ABC and took part to television experiments. Then he returned to New York, his hometown since 1937. He was a star on Broadway and then Boston in the musical "Streets of Paris". The producer teamed him with Carmen Miranda, who appeared for the first time outside of Brazil. He in turn starred in Brazil on shows at the Casino Atlantico in Rio de Janeiro and Casino Urca.

Sablon made his debut at the Teatro Municipal in São Paulo in 1940, and then in Argentina, Uruguay and Chile. In 1941, he had further engagements in New York, at the Waldorf Astoria, the Plaza and at the San Regis hotels, before going on, in 1942, in Los Angeles and in Cuba, and then touring in America, Brazil and Argentina. Some of his appearances were at the profit of war victims.

Meanwhile, in 1943, in London, his sister Germaine was the first to perform Le chant des partisans, which became the anthem of the French Resistance. That year, Sablon continued to sing in Brazil, Argentina and Uruguay, appearing there through 1945, when he returned to the US to perform in New York, Chicago and Washington. The following year found him again in New York, as well as in Hollywood, Boston, Brussels (ABC), Paris (ABC), Mexico (Ciro's) and Canada. A further US tour in 1947-48 took him to New Orleans, San Francisco, Hollywood (Ciro's), Boston, Los Angeles (Beverly Hills) and Palm Beach, and then onto Brazil, Argentina and Canada.

Sablon's recording of Les Feuilles mortes in the summer of 1947 in New York (RCA Victor 855332) is the earliest version of this classic, known as "Autumn Leaves" in the US. In 1948 he followed and equaled the box office receipts of Danny Kaye at the London Palladium. In France, Jacqueline François received the award for the Grand Prix du Disque for C'est le printemps, the French version of "It Might As Well Be Spring" written by Sablon.

Thereafter, one international success followed another. In 1949 in New York, then Holland, Switzerland, France and the UK. In 1950, he appeared again in Switzerland (Gstaad) and the UK. It was in London that he recorded on 30 March C'est Si Bon with the orchestra of Woolf Philips, and on 23 November he recorded the English version with lyrics by Jerry Seleen in Buenos Aires, with the orchestra of Emile Stern. In the intervening months he appeared again in Holland and Brazil, concluding his South American tour in Uruguay and Chile. He was cheered at the Théâtre l'Étoile, where Gene Kelly unsuccessfully attempted to persuade him to play the role of Henri Baurel in An American in Paris (subsequently taken by Georges Guetary).

Throughout the 1950s, Sablon traveled constantly (except for a year's sabbatical in 1957). He appeared repeatedly in the US, the UK, France and Brazil, as well as in Canada, Portugal, Morocco, Algeria, Greece, Italy and Egypt, and Mexico, Cuba and Spain. In 1952, he starred in the film Paris Chante toujours, and the same year became the first French entertainer to be featured in his own show in Las Vegas. Under the banner of the Moss Empire, Sablon toured the UK and Ireland. Later in the decade he extended his travels to include India, Australia and New Zealand, Tahiti, Panama and Venezuela.

With the increasing popularity of television, Sablon was able to reduce his travels while at the same time reaching a larger new audience on both sides of the Atlantic. Nonetheless, he managed to maintain a tight schedule of international appearances throughout the 1960s, attracting enthusiastic crowds not only in Europe, South America and the US, but in South Africa, Bermuda, New Caledonia, the Philippines, Hong Kong, Japan (where he spent three months) and Iran (where he appeared before the Shah at the royal palace).

Towards the end of the 1960s, Sablon resolved to limit his overseas travels and settled into his house at Theoule-sur-Mer on the Côte d'Azur. He was engaged at the Paris Cabaret Don Camillo which became one of the first colored transmissions on TV. In 1971, he was asked by Pierre Granier-Deferre to record "Le Temps des Souvenirs" for the soundtrack of the film "Le Chat". The 1970s and the 1980s found Sablon performing regularly on TV, not only in France, but in Switzerland, Italy, Brazil and the US. In addition, he regularly offered his services on behalf of charitable causes: The Red Cross Gala in Monaco in 1972, the gala for the restoration of Versailles in 1973 and the International Festival of Song first in Brazil and then in Uruguay.

At the urging of US impresario George Wein and singer-pianist Bobby Short, Jean celebrated his 75th birthday at the Met (Lincoln Center) in New York, appearing with the orchestra of Frank Sinatra, thus making his farewell to his American followers. His Adieux in Paris in 1982 were televised in prime time from the Pavillon Gabriel (the former Alcazar d'Eté) and he made his last performance in Rio de Janeiro at the Copacabana Palace in 1984.

Jean Sablon became the most widely acclaimed male French singer of his generation in the world, considered second only in overall lifetime popularity to Maurice Chevalier, a senior model for him. His records sold in the millions around the world and he is frequently referred to as the French equivalent of America's Bing Crosby and Frank Sinatra. During his career, he recorded with some of the world's top musicians, including Django Reinhardt and Stéphane Grappelli.

Sablon appeared in a number of motion pictures and television films performing as a vocalist or pianist, his last being in 1984 when he sang "April in Paris" in Mistral's Daughter, the popular American TV miniseries filmed in France.

Jean Sablon died in Cannes in 1994 and was buried in the Cimetière du Montparnasse in Paris.

== Personal life ==
Jean Sablon was the son of composer Charles Sablon and the brother of composer André Sablon and singer and actress Germaine Sablon. The actor Jacques Sablon was his nephew. He lived with his partner, Carl Galm, for over four decades. While he was discreet about his homosexuality, it was an open secret. Sablon and Galm were together from 1937 until their deaths in 1994, sharing the same vault at the Montparnasse cemetery in Paris.

== Commemorative Street Names ==
- On 30 April 2004 the allée Jean Sablon was inaugurated in the 16th arrondissement of Paris.
- On 7 September 2006 the promenade Jean Sablon was inaugurated along the Marne, in Nogent-sur-Marne, on the occasion of an exhibition for the centenary of Sablon's birth.
- On 10 April 2010 the allée Jean Sablon was inaugurated on the Promenade de la Croisette in Cannes.
- On 15 May 2015 the esplanade Jean Sablon was inaugurated in Théoule-sur-Mer.

== Revues ==
- 1927 : Au temps de Gastounet, by Georges Gabriel Thenon, Théâtre des Bouffes-Parisiens.
- 1931 : Revue Argentine, by Manuel Romero and Bayon Herrera. Parade de femmes, by Henri Varna, Léo Lelièvre and Marc Cab, Le Palace. Paris qui brille, by Henri Varna, Léo Lelièvre and Earl Leslie, Casino de Paris.
- 1932 : Ces messieurs dames, by Francis Carco, Le Studio de Paris.
- 1934 : Femmes en folie, by Maurice Hermitte and Jean Le Seyeux, Folies Bergère.
- 1935 : Pirouette 35, by Fernand Rouvray and Max Eddy, Théâtre des Dix Francs.

== Operettas ==
- 1924 : Madame, by Albert Willemetz, music by Henri Christiné, Théâtre des Bouffes-Parisiens.
- 1928 : Lulu, by Serge Veber, music by Georges Van Parys and Philippe Parès, Théâtre Daunou.
- 1929 : Vive Leroy, by Henri Géroule and René Pujol, music by Fred Pearly and Pierre Chagnon, Théâtre des Capucines.
- 1933 : Dix-neuf ans, by Jean Bastia, music by Pascal Bastia, Théâtre Daunou.
- 1936 : Le Chant des tropiques, by Louis Sauvat and Champfleury, music by Moyses Simons, Théâtre de Paris.

== Musical theatre ==
- 1923 : La Dame en décolleté, by Yves Mirande and Lucien Boyer, music by Maurice Yvain, Théâtre des Bouffes-Parisiens.
- 1925 : Trois jeunes filles nues, by Yves Mirande and Albert Willemetz, music by Raoul Moretti, Théâtre des Bouffes-Parisiens.

== Filmography ==
- 1924 : Madame Sans-Gêne by Léonce Perret.
- 1930 : Everybody Wins by René Pujol and Hans Steinhoff.
- 1939 : La Grande Farandole by H. C. Potter.
- 1951 : Paris Still Sings by Pierre Montazel.
