= Mario Cazes =

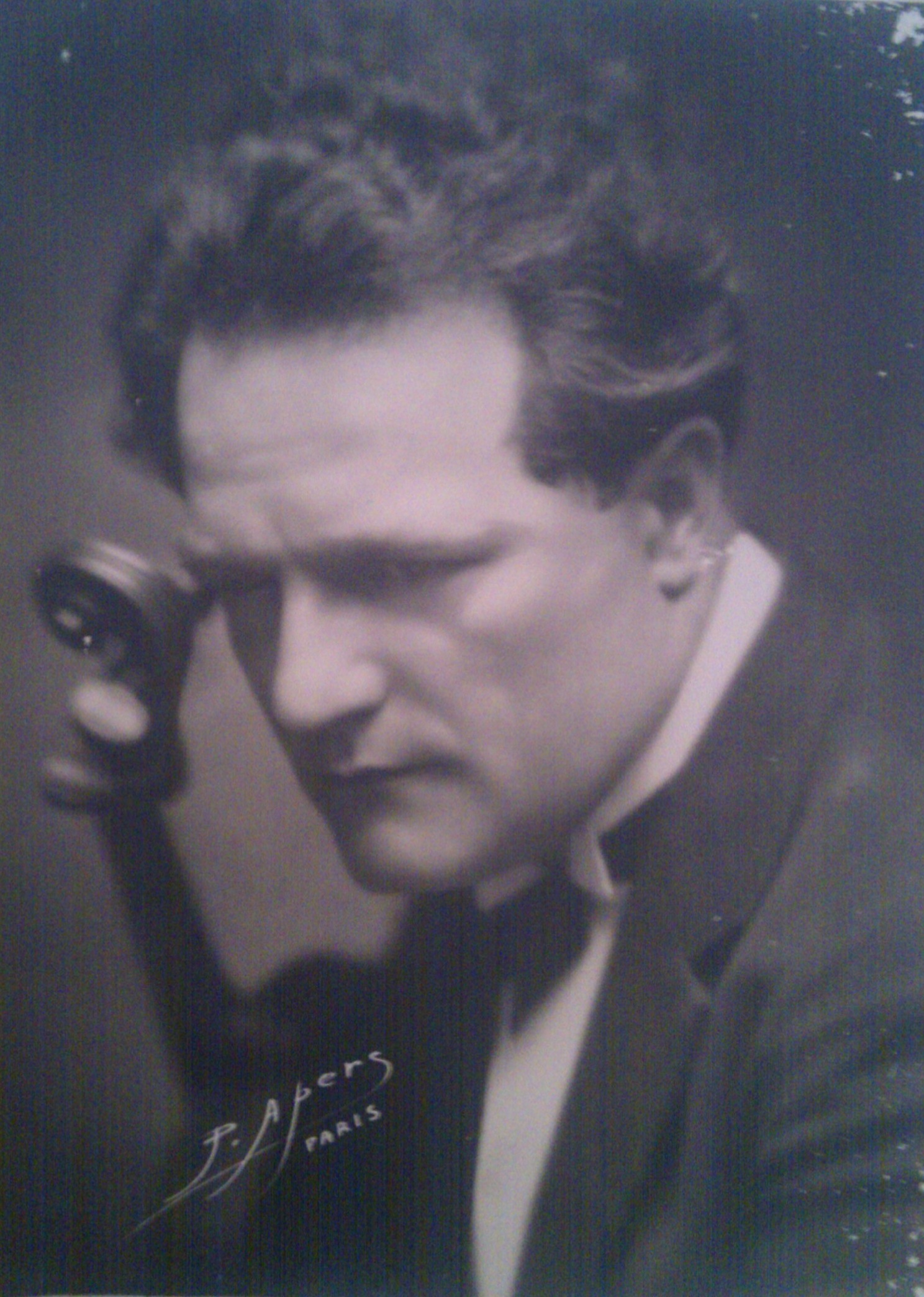
- Mario Cazes
- Born: Marius Joseph Cazes; 17 July 1890; Béziers
- Died: 3 November 1972 (aged 82); Béziers
- Occupations: Musician; Composer

Mario Cazes (17 July 1890 – 3 November), was a 20th-century French composer, conductor and violinist extremely popular during the 1920s and 1930s.

He was a recipient of the ordre national of the Légion d'honneur.

Marius Joseph Cazes, the son of Cazes Joseph-Auguste and Avérous Zélie, was the eldest in a family of five brothers and two sisters.

Considered one of the greatest violinists of his time, he was the first with his band to perform on Radio Tour Eiffel in 1927.

== Compositions ==
- 1924: Elle est jolie jolie (fox-trot) sung by Denantès
- 1924: Serenata deï Fiori (Sérénade Boston) sung by Emma Liebel
- 1924: Violon tzigane (Boston)
- 1924: Dis-moi je t'aime
- 1924: Miarko-Tango
- 1924: Mon Lulu, sung by Emma Liebel
- 1925: Rien qu'une nuit, "Valse Boston" sung by Georges Vorelli
- 1925: Sous un clair de lune (Fox-trot)
- 1925: Napoletana, Emma Liebel, Sonnelly, sung by Emma Liebel
- 1925: Noël
- 1926: J'ai peur de toi, 1926.
- 1926: Pourquoi pleurer ma mie ?, sung by Georges Vorelli, Emma Liebel
- 1926: Pourquoi ?, sung by Emma Liebel
- 1926: Un p'tit brin de muguet, "Fox Trot"
- 1926: Je pense à toi, sung by Mistinguett
- 1927: C'est l'oiseau blanc, lyrics by Didier Gold, éd. Marcel Labbé
- 1927: Oh ! ma poupée (Poupée d'amour) (Valse Boston), lyrics by Didier Gold, éd. Montmartre édition, sung by Emma Liebel
- 1927: Ne pleure pas, sung by Adolphe Bérard "FOX-BLUES"
- 1927: Lettre d'adieu, sung by Emma Liebel
- 1927: Nuits d'Orient
- 1927: Brûlez vos lettres d'amour (Valse Boston)
- 1927: Valse en sourdine, sung by Mistinguett
- 1928: Gustave, sung by Cairoli Porto au Cirque Médrano
- 1928: Peut-être, sung by Georgel
- 1928: Souvenir, "Chanson Slave"
- 1928: C'est ce soir ou jamais, sung by Mado Conti; Marcel Malloire
- 1928: Ames désolées, poème lyrique by Senga in memoriam Emma Liebel
- 1929: Séduction, sung by Carmen Vildez, Jane Deloncle, Malloire, Annie Flore
- 1929: La Valse triste
- 1929: T'aimer, "Java-Valse"
- 1930: Jamais, "Modern'Valse"
- 1930: Folie, "Valse Moderne"
- 1930: Valse Boston, "Opérette MARISKA"
- 1930: Adoration de l'opérette Mariska, sung by Paul Gesky, Carmen Vildez, Berthe Sylva
- 1930: Aimer, souffrir, mourir from the operetta Mariska, sung by Berthe Sylva.
- 1933: Quand il viendra
- 1957: Avec celui qu'on aime, lyrics by Loulou Gasté), sung by Line Renaud, Franck Pourcel.

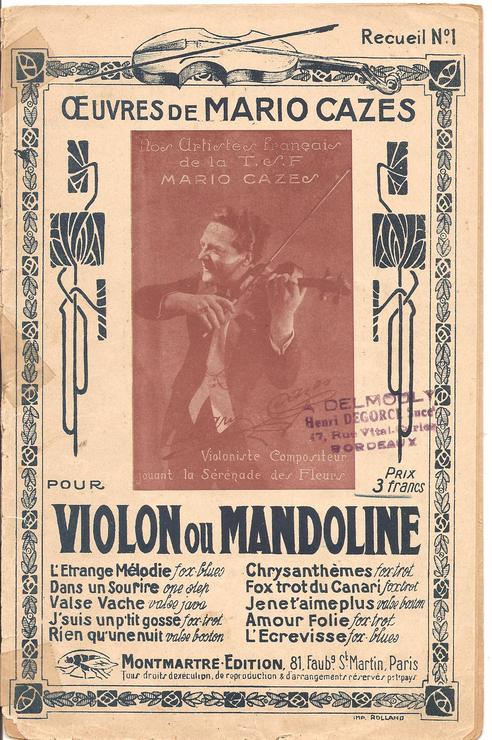
Music sheet of Mario Cazes, for violon or mandoline

- Ton Retour, (Chantal Dorian, Jean Castillon)
- Maria-Magdalena, (Chantal Dorian, Jean Castillon)
- Près de toi, (Chantal Dorian, Jean Castillon)
- Valse à La Viennoise, performers Linette Dolmet, Lola Sernys, Regina de Bergonie, Simone Azibert
- Toi, performer Vorelli, Emma Liebel
- Il est une maison, performer Emma Liebel
- Je m'en Balance, performer Reynem
- La Valse triste, performers (Jean Cyrano, Castillon
- Rien ne vaut ta bouche, performer (Marcel Malloire
- Pour un rien, pour un mot, performers Emma Liebel, Marcel Malloire
- A Monaco, performers Carmen Vildez, Reine Chantiex, Gina Relly
- Lorsque nous serons vieux, performer Brancato, Marcel Malloire
- Neapolitan, performer Bernardo de Page.
- Mon seul amour, lyrics by Pierre Alberty
- 1947: Prière d'amour, lyrics by Pierre Decourt, éd. Salabert (EAS14840)

Prends-moi, Hawaï, Aux reflets de Paris, Si tu voulais, La Vira, Serment d'Amour, M'amour!M'amour!, Aux reflets de Paris, Moana, Ne faites pleurer les femmes, Pour toi, Garde-moi, Obsession, Ton bonheur, Chant des Guitares, Tout près de moi, Tu me verras passer, L'étrange Mélodie, Dans un Sourire, Valse Vache, J'suis un p'tit gosse, Chrysanthèmes, Fox trot du Canari, Je ne t'aime plus, Amour Folie, L'Écrevisse, Ma Wallonie, En Dansant Le Charl'ston, Le Chapelet d'amour, Chemineau, Petite Fumée...

== Operettas ==
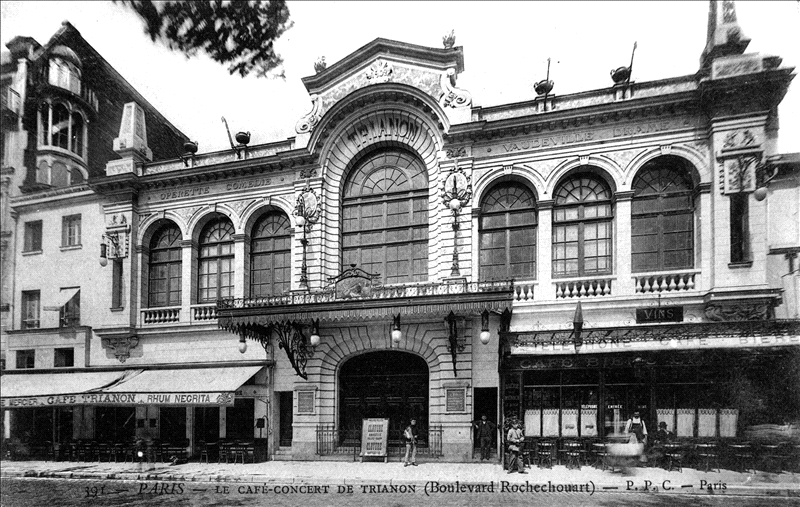
Paris : Le Trianon

1930
Mariska, at the Trianon Lyrique, premiered 22 December

- Text: Michel Carré, Georges Sibre, Philippe Goudard.
- Music: Cazes Mario.
- 78 rpm recordings:
  - 1931: Adoration : Berthe Sylva (song)
  - 1931: Aimer, souffrir, mourir : Jovatti (song)
  - 1931: Aimer, souffrir, mourir : Leone (song)
  - 1931: Aimer, souffrir, mourir : Malloire (song)
  - 1931: Aimer, souffrir, mourir : Berthe Sylva (song)
  - 1931: J'ai pas voulu : Sandrey (song)
  - 1931: Le P'tit machin : Grandini (song)
  - 1931: Mi madre : Grandini (song)
  - 1931: Mi madre : Jovatti (song)
  - 1931: Mi madre : Malloire (song), Orchestre Pierre Chagnon
  - 1931: Mi madre : Louis Zucca (song)
  - 1931: Mi madre : Orchestre Quattrocchi
  - 1931: Séduction : Mario Cazes (Orchestra)
  - 1931: Un flirt : Sandrey (song)

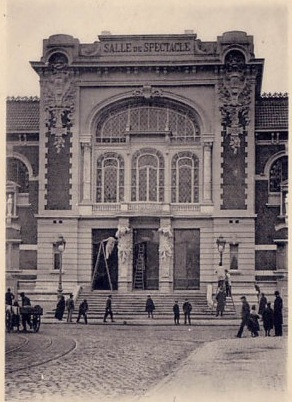
Théâtre Sébastopol

1933
Honolulu, at the Théâtre Sébastopol, premiered 8 February

- Text: Michel Carré, Philippe Goudard
- Music: Mario Cazes.
- 78 rpm recordings:
  - 1933: La Chanson du souvenir: Louis Zucca (song)

== Cinema ==
- 1926: La lueur dans les ténèbres, by Maurice Charmeroy.
- 1943: Béatrice devant le désir, by Jean de Marguenat; music: Mario Cazes, Georges Van Parys and André Sablon, with Mario Cazes (the violinist).
