= Jacques Sablon =

Jacques Sablon (1920, Nogent-sur-Marne – 1981, Nice) was a 20th-century French film actor.

He was the grandson of actor Gustave Hamilton, the nephew of singers Jean Sablon and Germaine Sablon and the cousin of actress Berthe Jalabert.

== Filmography ==
- 1944: Behold Beatrice (by Jean de Marguenat)
- 1950: A Certain Mister (by Yves Ciampi)
- 1950: The Treasure of Cantenac (by Sacha Guitry) - Prosper
- 1950: The Man from Jamaica (by Maurice de Canonge)
- 1950: Les Aventuriers de l'air (by René Jayet)
- 1951: Les Joyeux Pèlerins (by Alfred Pasquali)
- 1951: Adhémar (by Fernandel) - Private Investigator who finds Mr. Braconfield Lookalike
- 1953: Le Gang des pianos à bretelles (Gangsters en jupons) (by Gilles de Turenne and Jacques Daniel-Norman)
- 1953: The Other Side of Paradise (by Edmond T. Gréville)
- 1955: Napoléon (by Sacha Guitry) - Robespierre jeune (uncredited)
- 1955: If All the Guys in the World (by Christian-Jaque) - Un marin du Lutèce
- 1957: Que les hommes sont bêtes (by Roger Richebé) - (uncredited)
- 1957: Mademoiselle et son gang (by Jean Boyer)
- 1958: Police judiciaire (by Maurice de Canonge)
- 1962: The Mysteries of Paris (by André Hunebelle)
- 1966: La Grande Vadrouille (by Gérard Oury)
- 1969: Une veuve en or (by Michel Audiard) - Un membre de la bande à Raphaël (uncredited)
- 1969: Tintin and the Temple of the Sun (cartoon by Raymond Leblanc and Eddie Lateste) - (voice) (final film role)
