= Henry Kistemaeckers (playwright) =

Belgian author and playwright (1872–1938)

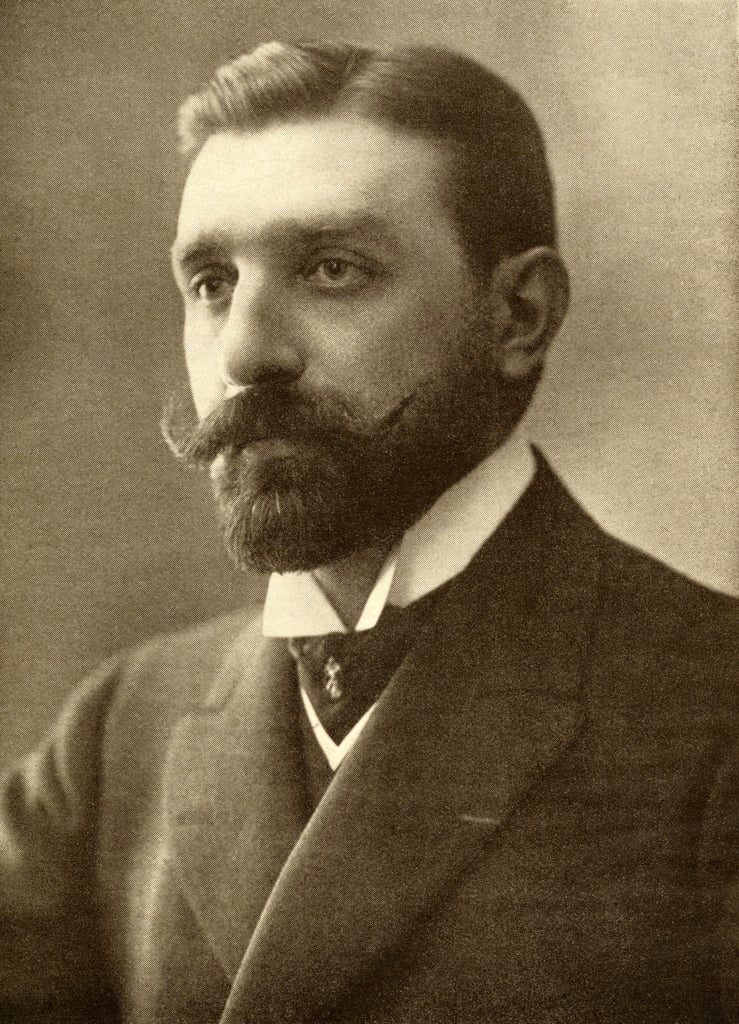
- Henry Kistemaeckers c. 1800s
- Born: Henry Hubert Alexandre Kistemaeckers; October 13, 1872; Floreffe, Belgium
- Died: January 21, 1938 (aged 65); Paris, France
- Citizenship: Naturalized French
- Occupations: Playwright and Novelist
- Spouse: Julie Carvés

Signature
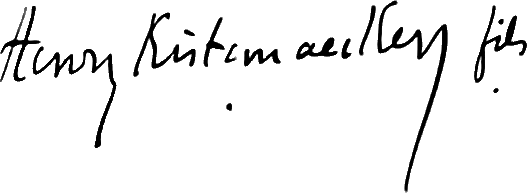

Henry Hubert Alexandre Kistemaeckers (October 13, 1872 – January 21, 1938) was a prolific Belgian-born French author and playwright.

== Early life and career ==
Henry Hubert Alexandre Kistemaeckers was born in Floreffe, a small town some forty-five miles southeast of Brussels. He was the son of Henry Kistemaeckers (1851–1934), a controversial Belgian publisher often at odds with the censorship laws of the day. As a young man, Kistemaeckers attended the Royal Athenaeum at Ostend, the University of Brussels and had published his first works while still in his teens.

He began as a novelist but soon turned to playwriting for his livelihood. A vast number of works would flow from his hand over the decades of his life, with Instinct, Marchand de Bonheur, Le Roi de Palaces, La Passante and Un Jour de Amour among his more successful productions. His drama Le Flambée was adapted for the English stage by Peter Le Marchant and produced in London as The Turning Point and in New York as The Spy. The Broadway play Where the Poppies Grow, produced at the Theatre Republic in 1918, was adapted from Kistemaeckers’ Un Soir, au Front by Roi Cooper Megrue. His most successful Broadway production, Woman of Bronze, was written with Eugene Delard 1907 as La Rivale and adapted for the American stage by Paul Kester. The play opened at the Frazee Theatre on September 7, 1920 and had a run of 252 performances. In the summer of 1927 Woman of Bronze returned to the Lyric Theatre for a 30 performance revival.

== Private life ==
Kistemaeckers became a French citizen in 1900 after achieving success in Paris. He was married to Julie Carvés, the daughter of ship’s captain, and among his hobbies were fencing and automobiles. Kistemaeckers was a recipient of the Chevalier of the Legion of Honor, served as president of the French Society of Authors and was a member of the Society of Playwrights, Society of Men of Letters and the popular committee of the Society of Preservation against Tuberculosis.

== Death ==
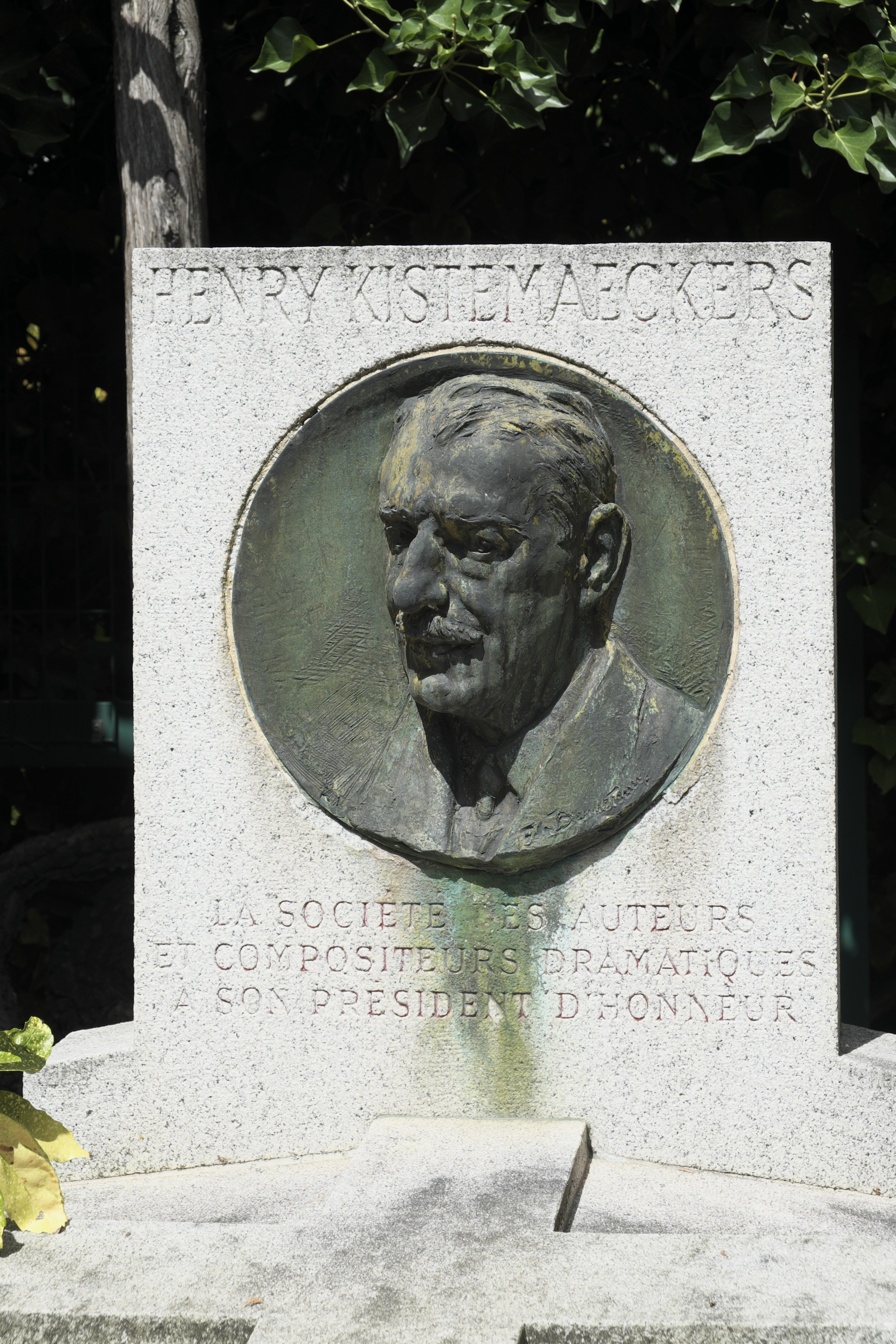
Grave of Henry Kistemaeckers on Passy Cemetery in Paris

Kistemaeckers died in Paris on January 21, 1938, at the age of 65.

== Selected works ==
- L'Apprentissage de Lord Will, Moeurs Automobiles, (1903)
- The Theatre at the Exposition (1937)

=== Plays ===
- Pierrot amoureux, (1890)
- Idylle Nocturne, (1891)
- Morale du Siècle, (1892)
- Accroche-cœurs, (1893)
- Le Menage Quinquet, (1893)
- L'amour en Jaune, (1894)
- Marthe, (1899)
- La Blessure, (1900)
- Oedipe, (1901)
- Le Premier client, (1903)
- L'Instinct, (1905)
- La Rivale – with Eugene Delard, (1907) – English-language adaptation by Paul Kester: The Woman of Bronze (1920)
- Le Marchand de Bonheur, (1910)
- Le Roi des palaces, (1911)
- La Flambée, (1911) – English-language adaptation by Peter Le Marchant: The Turning Point / The Spy
- L'Embuscade, (1913)
- L'Occident, with Gaston Sorbets, (1913)
- Un Soir, au Front, (1918) – English-language adaptation by Roi Cooper Megrue: Where the Poppies Grow
- La Passante, (1921)
- L'Amour, (1924)
- La nuit est à nous, (1925)
- Deodat, (1933)
- Works produced between 1890 and 1913 from Who's Who in the Theatre

== Filmography ==
- L'Instinct, directed by Henri Pouctal (France, 1916, based on the play L'Instinct)
- Eye for Eye, directed by Albert Capellani (1918, based on the play L'Occident)
- Marthe, directed by Gaston Roudès (France, 1920, based on the play Marthe)
- Flipotte, directed by Jacques de Baroncelli (France, 1920, based on the novel Flipotte)
- La Blessure, directed by Roberto Roberti (Italy, 1922, based on the play La Blessure)
- La fiammata, directed by Carmine Gallone (Italy, 1922, based on the play La Flambée)
- The Woman of Bronze, directed by King Vidor (1923, based on the play La Rivale)
- Le Marchand de Bonheur, directed by Giuseppe Guarino (France, 1926, based on the play Le Marchand de Bonheur)
- L'Occident, directed by Henri Fescourt (France, 1928, based on the play L'Occident)
- The Night Belongs to Us, directed by Carl Froelich (German, 1929, based on the play La nuit est à nous)
  - The Night Is Ours, directed by Carl Froelich and Henry Roussel (French, 1930, based on the play La nuit est à nous)
- Instinct, directed by André Liabel and Léon Mathot (France, 1930, based on the play L'Instinct)
- Un Soir, au Front, directed by Alexandre Ryder (France, 1931, based on the play Un Soir, au Front)
- King of the Hotel, directed by Carmine Gallone (French, 1932, based on the play Le Roi des palaces)
  - King of the Ritz, directed by Carmine Gallone and Herbert Smith (English, 1933, based on the play Le Roi des palaces)
- Plein aux as, directed by Jacques Houssin (France, 1933, based on the novel Flipotte)
- La Flambée, directed by Jean de Marguenat (France, 1934, based on the play La Flambée)
- The West, directed by Henri Fescourt (France, 1938, based on the play L'Occident)
- L'Embuscade, directed by Fernand Rivers (France, 1941, based on the play L'Embuscade)
- The Flame, directed by Alessandro Blasetti (Italy, 1952, based on the play La Flambée)
- The Night Is Ours, directed by Jean Stelli (France, 1953, based on the play La nuit est à nous)

=== Screenwriter ===
- 1920: Le Secret du Lone Star, by Jacques de Baroncelli
