= Po dolinam i po vzgoriam =

Imperial Russian song

"Through Valleys and Over Hills" (Russian: По долинам и по взгорьям) or "Through Forests and Over Hills" (Serbo-Croatian: По шумама и горама / Po šumama i gorama), also known as the "Partisan's Song", is a popular Red Army song from the Russian Civil War.

Pyotr Parfyonov wrote the latest version of the song after the 1922 Battle of Volochayevka. It is sung to the melody of "Rozpryahayte, khloptsi, koni", a Ukrainian folk song.

The song has many versions in other languages, including Serbo-Croatian, Greek, German, French, Hungarian, Hebrew, Kurdish, and as well as in many languages of the Soviet Union. The song was adapted by the Yugoslav Partisans and used in World War II. An earlier version of the lyrics was written by Vladimir Gilyarovsky in 1915 during World War I and dedicated to the Siberian Riflemen.

== History ==
Vladimir Gilyarovsky wrote the poem "From the Taiga, the Deep Taiga" in 1915 during World War I dedicated to the Siberian Riflemen, with text similar to the well-known version. Gilyarovsky's poem was published that year in several corpuses of Great War's soldiers' songs, and in the post-Soviet era it became known as the March of the Siberian Riflemen.

After the end of the Russian Civil War, the song was popular within the Soviet Union. Later, during World War II, it resurged in popularity among anti-fascist partisan fighters, most prominently among Yugoslav and Soviet partisans.

The song entered the official canon of Soviet songs when the director of the Red Army choir Aleksandr Aleksandrov, together with the poet Sergei Alymov, introduced the song into the choir repertoire. The words of the song were attributed to Alymov. The author of the melody was named as Ilya Aturov, commander of a Red Army unit, from whom Aleksandrov heard the melody of the song. The Red Army choir rendition was distributed on phonograph records. In 1934, a letter from veterans of the Russian Civil War in the Far East was published in the Izvestia central newspaper, naming Pyotr Parfyonov as the original author. Later that year, Parfyonov recalled the story of the creation of the song in the Krasnoarmeyets–Krasnoflotets (lit. 'Red Army man and Red Fleet man') magazine. In this article, Parfyonov wrote that he borrowed the melody from his earlier 1914 song Na Suchane (lit. 'On the Suchan'), and penned the verses to Po dolinam i po vzgoriam after the Red takeover of Vladivostok in early 1920. However, he was arrested in 1935 and executed in 1937 as part of the Great Purge. The song continued to be published attributed to Alymov and Aturov until the Supreme Court of the Russian SFSR confirmed Parfyonov's authorship in 1962.

Decades after the end of the Russian Civil War, White émigré accounts were published that included the lyrics to a White variation of the song, the March of the Drozdovites, claimed to have been written by White colonel Pyotr Batorin in commemoration of the Jassy-Don March. These accounts claimed that the composer Dmitry Pokrass was ordered to write the tune of the march by Colonel Anton Turkul during the White occupation of Kharkov in 1919.

The song is commonly played by the Alexandrov Ensemble. In the Middle East, the Russian song also got Hebrew texts written by the poets Avraham Shlonsky - Halokh halkha hevraya - a translation after Alexander Blok, which in several mobilizing versions served the Zionist Socialist Hashomer Hatzair movement and the Palestinian Communist Youth (now BANKI) movement in the Mandatory Palestine and then in Israel - and Didi Menosi - Mul gesher hanahar - which is known in the interpretation by the Israeli Gevatron ensemble. The music was used also as the first melody for the anthem of Palmakh Jewish shock units in Palestine. In the 1960s, French anarchist Étienne Roda-Gil penned a version dedicated to the Makhnovshchina.

== Lyrics ==
=== "Through Valleys and Over Hills" ===
Russian original

По долинам и по взгорьям
Шла дивизия вперёд,
Чтобы с боя взять Приморье —
Белой армии оплот

Наливалися знамена
Кумачом последних ран,
Шли лихие эскадроны
Приамурских партизан.

Этих лет не смолкнет слава,
Не померкнет никогда —
Партизанские отряды
Занимали города.

И останутся, как в сказках,
Как манящие огни
Штурмовые ночи Спасска,
Волочаевские дни.

Разгромили атаманов,
Разогнали воевод
И на Тихом океане
Свой закончили поход.

Romanization

Po dolinam i po vzgoriam
Šla divizija vpered,
Čtoby s boja vzjatj Primore —
Beloj armii oplot.

Nalivalisja znamena
Kumačom poslednih ran,
Šli lihije eskadrony
Priamurskih partizan.

Etih let ne smolknet slava,
Ne pomerknet nikogda —
Partizanskije otrjady
Zanimali goroda.

I ostanutsja, kak v skazkah,
Kak manjaščije ogni,
Šturmovyje noči Spasska,
Voločajevskije dni.

Razgromili atamanov,
Razognali vojevod,
I na Tihom okeane
Svoj zakončili pohod.

Literal translation

Across the valleys and across the hills
The divisions marched forward,
To capture Primorye in battle —
The stronghold of the White Army.

The banners fell
In the bunting of the last wounds
Went dashing divisions
Of the partisans of Amur.

The glory of those years will never fade,
No, they shall never fade —
As the partisan troops
Captured the cities.

They will remain legends,
Like alluring lights
Through the storming nights of Spassk
and the days of Volochaevka.

[We] defeated the atamans,
The voevodes were dispersed
And on the Pacific Ocean
We ended our campaign.

=== "From the Taiga, the Deep Taiga" ===
Russian original

Из тайги, тайги дремучей
От Амура, от реки
Молчаливой, грозной тучей,
Шли на бой сибиряки.

Их сурово воспитала
Молчаливая тайга,
Бури грозные Байкала,
И сибирские снега.

Ни усталости, ни страха,
Бьются ночь и бьются день,
Только серая папаха
Лихо сбита набекрень.

Эх, Сибирь, Сибирь родная,
За тебя ль мы постоим,
Волнам Рейна и Дуная
Твой привет передадим!

Romanization

Iz tajgi, tajgi dremučej
Ot Amura, ot reki
Molčalivoj, groznoj tučej,
Šli na boj sibirjaki.

Ih surovo vospitala
Molčalivaja tajga,
Buri groznyje Bajkala,
I sibirskije snega.

Ni ustalosti, ni straha,
Biutsja nočj i biutsja den,
Toljko seraja papaha
Liho sbita nabekrenj.

Eh, Sibirj, Sibirj rodnaja,
Za tebja my postoim.
Volnam Rejna i Dunaja
Tvoj privet peredadim!

Literal translation

From the taiga, the deep taiga
From the Amur, from the river
Like a silent, fearsome cloud
Siberians march to battle.

They have been sternly raised
By the silent taiga,
By the fearsome storms of Baikal,
And Siberian snows.

With neither fatigue nor fear
Fighting day and night long,
Only their gray papakhas
Are dashingly worn askew.

Oh, Siberia, dear Siberia,
We'll stand up for you.
To the waves of the Rhine and the Danube
We'll give you our regards!

=== "March of the Siberian Riflemen" ===
French original

Dans le froid et la famine,
Par les villes et par les champs,
A l'appel de Dénikine,
Marchaient les Partisans Blancs.

Sabrant les troupes bolcheviques,
En ralliant les Atamans.
Dans leurs campagnes épiques,
Ils traquaient Trotsky tremblant.

C'est pour la Sainte Russie,
Pour la vieille tradition,
Pour la gloire et la patrie,
Que luttaient ces bataillons.

Votre gloire est immortelle,
Volontaires et Officiers Blancs,
Et votre agonie cruelle,
La honte de l'occident.

English translation

In the cold and the famine,
By the cities and by the fields,
At the call of Denikin,
Marched the White Partisans,

Slashing Bolshevik troupes,
by rallying the Atamans.
In their epic campaigns,
they were hunting down trembling Trotsky.

It is for a Holy Russia,
For the old traditions,
For the glory and the motherland,
That these battalions were fighting.

Your glory is immortal,
White Volunteers and Officers,
And our cruel agony,
The shame of the west.

=== "The Makhnovshchina" ===
French original

Makhnovchtchina, Makhnovchtchina
Tes drapeaux sont noirs dans le vent
ils sont noirs de notre peine
ils sont rouges de notre sang.

Par les monts et par les plaines
dans la neige et dans le vent
à travers toute l'Ukraine
se levaient nos partisans.

Au Printemps les traités de Lénine
Ont livré l'Ukraine aux Allemands
À l'automne la Makhnovchtchina
Les avait jetés au vent.

L'armée blanche de Denikine
est entrée en Ukraine en chantant
mais bientôt la Makhnovchtchina
l'a dispersée dans le vent.

Makhnovchtchina, Makhnovchtchina
Armée noire de nos partisans
Qui combattait en Ukraine
contre les rouges et les blancs.

Makhnovchtchina, Makhnovchtchina
Armée noire de nos partisans
qui voulait chasser d'Ukraine
à jamais tous les tyrans.

English translation

Makhnovshchina, Makhnovshchina
Your flags are black in the wind
they are black with our pain
they are red with our blood.

Through the mountains and through the plains
in the snow and in the wind
all over Ukraine
our supporters rose.

In the Spring Lenin's Treatises
Delivered Ukraine to the Germans
In the fall the Makhnovshchina
Tossed them to the wind.

Denikin's White Army
entered Ukraine singing
but soon the Makhnovshchina
scattered it in the wind.

Makhnovshchina, Makhnovshchina
Black army of our partisans
Who was fighting in Ukraine
against the Reds and Whites.

Makhnovshchina, Makhnovshchina
Black army of our partisans
who wanted to drive out of Ukraine
forever all tyrants.

=== "Through Forests and Over Hills" ===
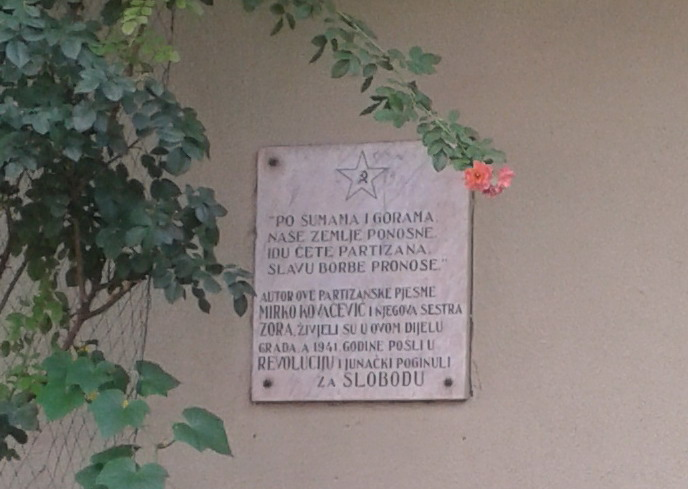
Memorial plaque to Zora and her brother Mirko Kovačević, the author of this version of the song, who later died as one of the most experienced 1st Split Partisan Detachment members; Obilićevo, Banja Luka, Bosnia and Herzegovina (their hometown)

Serbo-Croatian (Latin / Cyrillic) (Note: Strophes marked in italics were also sung during World War II, but usually do not appear in orchestral versions recorded later. The latter italic strophe (sixth from the top) was typically replaced by the fourth strophe instead.)
English translation

Po šumama i gorama
naše zemlje ponosne
idu čete partizana,
Slavu borbe pronose!

Mi smo djeca vjerna rodu
i ko jedan spremni svi
da u borbi za slobodu
umiremo svjesno mi!

Neka čuje (Note: Alternatively in Serbo-Croatian: Neka znade / Нека знаде, lit. 'Let [them] know') dušman kleti
krvavi se vodi rat, (Note: Alternatively in Serbo-Croatian: da će kod nas slomit' vrat / да ће код нас сломит' врат, lit. 'That they will have their necks broken here')
Prije ćemo mi umrijeti
Nego svoje zemlje dat'!

Kaznićemo izdajice,
Oslobodit' narod svoj,
Kazaćemo cijelom svijetu
Da se bije ljuti boj!

Crne horde nas ne plaše,
Krv herojska u nas vri,
Mi ne damo zemlje naše
Da je gaze fašisti!

Zgazit ćemo izdajice,
i prihvatit' ljuti boj,
spasit' kuće, oranice,
oslobodit' narod svoj.

По шумама и горама
наше земље поносне
иду чете партизана,
Славу борбе проносе!

Ми смо дјеца вјерна роду
и ко један спремни сви
да у борби за слободу
умиремо свјесно ми!

Нека чује душман клети
крвави се води рат,
Прије ћемо ми умријети
Него своје земље дат'!

Казнићемо издајице,
Ослободит' народ свој,
Казаћемо цијелом свијету
Да се бије љути бој!

Црне хорде нас не плаше,
Крв херојска у нас ври,
Ми не дамо земље наше
Да је газе фашисти!

Згазит ћемо издајице
и прихватит' љути бој,
спасит' куће, оранице,
ослободит' народ свој.

Throughout forests and mountains
of our proud country
troops of Partisans are passing by,
spreading the glory of struggle!

We are children loyal to our family
and all of us are as one ready,
that in the fight for freedom
we die consciously!

Let the cursed foe know
A bloody war is waged
We will rather die
Than give our land!

We will punish the traitors
And free all our people,
We will tell the entire world
That a bitter fight is fought!

Black hordes don't scare us
Heroic blood boils in our veins
We don't allow our lands
To be trampled by fascists!

We will trample down the traitors
and accept the furious battle,
save houses, arable land,
liberate our people.

==== Alternative version ====
Basil Davidson recites alternative lyrics as he heard them from Yugoslav Partisans in his 1946 book Partisan Picture:

Serbo-Croatian (Latin / Cyrillic)
English translation

Partizan sam tim se dičim:
To ne može biti svak
Umrijeti za slobodu,
Može samo div-junak.

Puška mi je drugarica,
Mitraljez mi moji brat:
Svakog časa odjim na straži,
Da tiranu skršim vrat.

Narodu sam zavjet dao,
Ja, narodni partizan:
Da ću čuvat' stijeg slobode,
Boriti se noć i dan.

Партизан сам тим се дичим:
То не може бити свак
Умријети за слободу,
Може само див-јунак.

Пушка ми је другарица,
Митраљез ми моји брат:
Сваког часа одјим на стражи,
Да тирану скршим врат.

Народу сам завјет дао,
Ја, народни партизан:
Да ћу чуват' стијег слободе,
Борити се ноћ и дан.

I'm a Partisan; of that I am proud.
Not everyone can be that,
To die for freedom
Only a giant-hero can!

The rifle is my comradess,
Machine gun my brother:
Every hour I am on guard,
To break the tyrant's neck.

I made a vow to the people,
I, the people's partisan:
That I will guard the flag of freedom,
Fight night and day.

=== Greek lyrics ===
Greek

Παρτιζάνοι προχωρείτε
Μεσ' τους κάμπους, στα βουνά
Να κερδίσουμε τη μάχη
Ν' ανατείλει η λευτεριά.

Από κάμπους και λαγκάδια
κατεβαίνει η αγροτιά,
μ'υψωμένα τα δρεπάνια
χαιρετάει την εργατιά.

Χρόνια τώρα εμείς σκυμμένοι
σκάβουμε τη μαύρη Γης
και τα πλούτη μας τα παίρνουν
οι τυράννοι οι αστοί.

Ό,τι βλέπουμε μπροστά μας
απ'τα χρόνια τα παλιά,
στη δουλειά μας τα χρωστάμε,
ζήτω-ζήτω η εργατιά!

Ας ξεχάσουμε τα μίση
ολα εκείνα τα παλιά,
κι ας υψώσουμε τα ξίφη
όλοι για τη λευτεριά.

Transliteration

Partizánoi prochoreíte
Mes' tous kámbous, sta vouná
Na kerdísoume ti máchi
N' anateíli i leuteriá.

Apó cámbous kai langádia
Katevaínei i agrotiá,
M'ypsoména ta drapánia
Chairetáei tin ergatiá.

Chrónia tóra emeís skymménoi
Scávoume ti maúri Gis
Kai ta ploúti mas ta paírnoun
oi tyránnoi oi astoí.

Ó, ti vlépoume brostá mas
ap'ta chrónia ta paliá,
sti douleiá mas ta chrostáme,
zíto-zíto i ergatiá!

As xechásoume ta mísi
óla ekeína ta paliá,
ki as ypsósoume ta xíphi
óloi gia ti leuteriá.

English translation

Partisans, move forward,
in the meadows and the mountains
so that we can win this battle
for the freedom to rise.

From plains and ravines
comes down the peasant class,
with sickles raised up
they greet the working class.

For years now we have bowed
digging the black Earth
and our riches are taken
by the tyrrants the bourgeois.

Everything we see in front of us
from the old years,
we owe it to our labour
long live-long live the working class!

Let us forget our grudges
all these grudges of old,
and let's raise our swords
all of us for liberty!

=== Hebrew lyrics ===
Hebrew original

היא עמדה אל מול גשר הנהר
שעליו הפסיע אתמול
גדוד של אלף פרטיזנים
.ואחד יקר מכל
גדוד של אלף פרטיזנים
.ואחד יקר מכל

את פניו הקפיא רוח הנהר
,אך ליבו עדיין בוער
אלף נערות הכיר הוא
.ואחת יפה יותר
אלף נערות הכיר הוא
.ואחת יפה יותר

השדה שמעבר לנהר
,ערירי כאילו אשם
אלף מצבות עומדות שם
.ואחת מהן בלי שם
אלף מצבות עומדות שם
.ואחת מהן בלי שם

האביב ממיס קרח בנהר
,ובשלל צבעיו מרתק
אלף ילדים שרים לו
.וילדון אחד שותק
אלף ילדים שרים לו
.וילדון אחד שותק

הם עומדים אל מול גשר הנהר
שעליו אי פעם צעד
גדוד של אלף פרטיזנים
.ואחד יקר לעד
גדוד של אלף פרטיזנים
ואחד יקר לעד

Romanization

hi amda el mul gesher haNahar
she'alav hifsia etmol
gdud shel elef partizanim
ve'echad yakar mikol
gdud shel elef partizanim
ve'echad yakar mikol

et panav hikpi ruach haNahar
akh libo adayin bo'er
elef na'arot hikir hu
ve'achat yaffa yoter
elef nearot hikir hu
ve'achat yaffa yoter

hasadeh she me'ever haNahar
ariri ke'illu ashem
elef matzevot omdot sham
ve'achat mehen bli shem
elef matzevot omdot sham
ve'achat mehen bli shem

ha'Aviv memis kerach baNahar
uBishlal tzva'av meratek
elef yeladim sharim lo
veYaldon echad shotek
elef yeladim sharim lo
veYaldon echad shotek

Hem omdim el mul gesher haNahar
she elav ei pa'am tza'ad
gdud shel elef partizanim
ve echad yakar la'ad
gdud shel elef partizanim
ve echad yakar la'ad

English translation

She stood in front of the river bridge,
Which he stepped on yesterday
A battalion of a thousand partisans
And one most precious of all.
A battalion of a thousand partisans
And one most precious of all.

His face froze in the river wind
But his heart is still burning,
A thousand girls he knew
And one more beautiful.
A thousand girls he knew
And one more beautiful.

The field across the river
Barren as if guilty,
A thousand tombstones stand there
And one of them without a name
A thousand tombstones stand there
And one of them without a name

Spring melting of ice in the river
And a variety of fascinating colours,
A thousand children sing it
And one little boy is silent.
A thousand children sing it
And one little boy is silent.

They stand in front of the river bridge
On which a battalion of a thousand partisans
A battalion of a thousand partisans
And one precious forever.
A battalion of a thousand partisans
And one precious forever.

=== "Hymn of the Spanish Maquis" ===
Spanish original

Por llanuras y montañas
Guerrilleros libres van
Los mejores luchadores
Del campo y de la ciudad
Los mejores luchadores
Del campo y de la ciudad

Ni el dolor ni la miseria
Nos impedirán vencer
Seguiremos adelante
Sin jamás retroceder
Seguiremos adelante
Sin jamás retroceder

Las banderas de combate
Como mantos cubrirán
A los bravos guerrilleros
Que en la lucha caerán
A las bravas guerrilleras
Muertas por la libertad

Que el futuro no se olvide
De cual fue nuestra misión
Acabar con el fascismo
Que en España se instauró
Acabar con el fascismo
Que en España se instauró

English translation

Through plains and mountains
Guerrillas roam free
The best fighters
From the countryside and the city
The best fighters
From the countryside and the city.

Neither pain nor misery
Will stop us from winning
We will keep moving forward
Without ever stepping back
we will keep moving forward
Without ever stepping back

The battle flags
Will cover like cloaks
The brave guerrilla fighters
That will fall in the struggle
The brave guerrilla fighters
Dead for the freedom

May the future not not forget
What our mission was
To end the fascism
That was established in Spain
To end the fascism
That was established in Spain

=== "The Guerrilla" ===
Spanish original

Por los valles y los Andes
guerrilleros libres van
los mejores luchadores
del campo y la ciudad
los mejores luchadores
del campo y la ciudad

Ni el dolor ni la miseria
los harán desfallecer
seguiremos adelante
sin jamás retroceder
seguiremos adelante
sin jamás retroceder

Nuestro pueblo nos ordena
combatir hasta triunfar
adelante camaradas
nuestra consigna es vencer
adelante camaradas
nuestra consigna es vencer

Venceremos al fascismo
en la batalla final
¡Abajo el imperialismo!
¡Muera!
¡Viva nuestra libertad!
¡Abajo el imperialismo!
¡Muera!
¡Viva nuestra libertad!

Las banderas de combate
como mantos cubrirán
a los bravos guerrilleros
que en la lucha caerán
a los bravos guerrilleros
que en la lucha caerán

English translation

Through valleys and the Andes
Guerrillas roam free
The best fighters
From the countryside and the city
The best fighters
From the countryside and the city.

Neither pain nor misery
Will stop us from winning
We will keep moving forward
Without ever stepping back
we will keep moving forward
Without ever stepping back

Our people command us
Combat until the triumph
Go forward comrade
Our slogan is win

We will win the fascism
In the final battle
Death to the imperialism!
Death!
Long live our liberty!
Death to the imperialism!
Death!
Long live our liberty!

The battle flags
Will cover like cloaks
The brave guerrilla fighters
That will fall in the struggle
The brave guerrilla fighters
That will fall in the struggle

== See also ==
- List of socialist songs
- “Chant des Partisans”
