= King of the Ritz =

1933 film

- Stanley Lupino
- Directed by: Carmine Gallone; Herbert Smith
- Written by: Clifford Grey; Ivor Montagu; Stafford Dickens; Stanley Lupino
- Based on: a play by Henry Kistemaeckers
- Produced by: Carmine Gallone
- Starring: Stanley Lupino; Betty Stockfeld; Hugh Wakefield
- Cinematography: Leslie Rowson
- Edited by: Arthur Tavares
- Music by: Raoul Moretti; Jack Beaver (uncredited)
- Production companies: British Lion; Gainsborough Pictures
- Distributed by: Gaumont British Distributors (UK)
- Release date: March 1933
- Running time: 81 minutes
- Country: United Kingdom
- Language: English

King of the Ritz is a 1933 British musical film directed by Carmine Gallone and Herbert Smith and starring Stanley Lupino, Betty Stockfeld and Hugh Wakefield. It was written by Clifford Grey, Ivor Montagu, Stafford Dickens and Lupino based on the 1923 play Le Roi des Palaces by Henry Kistemaeckers. A separate French-language version Le Roi Des Palace (King of the Hotel) (1932) was made, with Stockfeld appearing in both films.

== Plot summary ==
While working at a top hotel, the head porter falls in love with a wealthy female guest.

== Cast ==
- Stanley Lupino as Claude King
- Betty Stockfeld as Mrs. Cooper
- Hugh Wakefield as King of Blitz
- Henry Kendall as Teddy Smith
- Gina Malo as Victoria
- Gibb McLaughlin as Baron Popov
- Harry Milton as Alonso
- John Singer as pageboy

== Reception ==
Film Weekly wrote: "The production is as polished as you could wish, and the players do their pieces with considerable enthusiasm. The probable explanation of the result being only mildly amusing – and then just at the best moments – is that the Continental spirit of the original was lost in the act of 'translation'."

The Daily Film Renter wrote: "Aided by well-chosen musical numbers, Gallone's direction achieves fluent rhythm, but action drags at times. Stanley Lupino gives entertaining performance as omniscient hotel 'king,' while excellent work is done by Hugh Wakefield, Gina Malo, and bevies of beautiful girls. One of the most 'de luxe ' pictures to date – good general booking."
