= Vidocq (disambiguation) =

Eugène-François Vidocq (1775–1857) was a criminal-turned-crime fighter; founder of the French National Police and the first known private detective agency.

Vidocq may also refer to:

== Films ==
- Vidocq (1923 film), a French historical drama film
- Vidocq (1939 film), a historical crime film
- Vidocq (2001 film), a fantasy murder mystery

== Other ==
- Vidocq Society, a crime-solving club in Philadelphia, Pennsylvania, US
- A character in the manga series Nobunagun
- Vidocq, a comics series by Hans G. Kresse
