= Command Performance (1937 film) =

1937 British film by Sinclair Hill

- Directed by: Sinclair Hill
- Written by: Stafford Dickens; Michael Hankinson; George Pearson; Sinclair Hill
- Produced by: Harcourt Templeman
- Starring: Arthur Tracy; Lilli Palmer; Mark Daly; Finlay Currie
- Cinematography: Cyril Bristow
- Edited by: Michael Hankinson
- Music by: Louis Levy
- Production company: Grosvenor Films
- Distributed by: General Film Distributors
- Release date: 19 August 1937
- Running time: 84 minutes
- Country: United Kingdom
- Language: English

Command Performance is a 1937 British musical drama film directed by Sinclair Hill and starring Arthur Tracy, Lilli Palmer and Mark Daly. It was based on a play by Stafford Dickens. Like The Street Singer, which was released the same year, it was designed as a vehicle for Tracy who performs a number of songs during the film. It was made at Pinewood Studios. The film's sets were designed by the art director Wilfred Arnold.

== Plot ==
Growing tired of his life of fame, a singer runs away from a domineering manager and goes to live with a group of gypsies. A massive manhunt is whipped by the press to find him so that he can shoot the final scenes of his latest film.

== Cast ==
- Arthur Tracy as Street Singer
- Lilli Palmer as Susan
- Mark Daly as Joe
- Rae Collett as Betty
- Finlay Currie as Manager
- Jack Melford as Reporter
- Stafford Hilliard as Sam
- Julian Vedey as Toni
- Phyllis Stanley as Olga

== Bibliography ==
- Low, Rachael. Filmmaking in 1930s Britain. George Allen & Unwin, 1985.
- Wood, Linda. British Films, 1927–1939. British Film Institute, 1986.
