= Henri Ardel =

French writer (1863–1938)

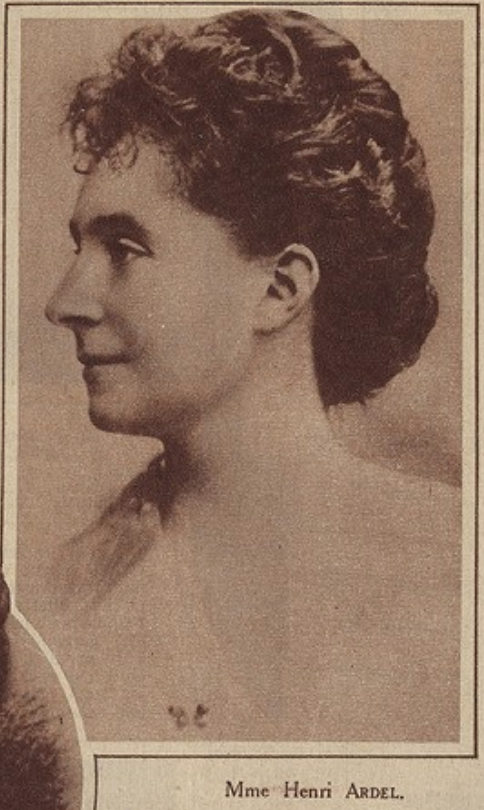
Henri Ardel (Eve, 1923)

Henri Ardel (pseudonym of Berthe Abraham; 1863–1938) was a French writer. She was a recipient of the Prix Botta and of the Ordre des Palmes académiques.

== Biography ==
Berthe Marie Victorine Palmyre Abraham was born in Amiens on 6 June 1863. Her parents, Lucie Mathilde Pillier and Alphonse Abraham. She lived in Enghien, then Paris. His sister, Marie-Louise, born 10 May 1877, married Georges Le Cordier; a writer herself, she took the pseudonym "Colette Henri-Ardel" after Berthe's death. Bertha was a teacher in a class for young girls. She made her literary debut by sending a short story to Léon de Tinseau who encouraged her. One of the many female writers who took a male pseudonym, she was author of "sentimental novels for ladies" published by Plon, in the Stella collection or in the Nelson collection. These novels were very successful:

In 1933, Cœur de sceptique was in its 100th edition, Le mal d'aimer, in its 125th, Mon cousin Guy, in its 181st. There is hardly anyone but Pierre Benoit to match such figures.

During the last ten years of her life, Ardel was involved in a charity to help poor children and to catechize them.

She died on 6 January 1938, and is buried in the Montreuil cemetery in Versailles.

== Awards and honours ==
She was a recipient of the Prix Botta for Cœur de sceptique in 1894, and of the Ordre des Palmes académiques in 1904.

== Selected works ==
- Près du bonheur, New York, W. R. Jenkins, collection "Contes choisis", no. 18, 1893, with English notes by Eugène Rigal (text, via Hathitrust)
- Cœur de sceptique (1894), Prix Botta
- L'Été de Guillemette, Plon, 1908 (text, via Internet Archive)
- Colette Bryce au Maroc, Plon, 1937
- Les Vacances de la famille Bryce, Plon, 1928
- Le Feu sous la cendre, Nelson, 1928, illustrations by Georges Dutriac
- Un conte bleu (1922)
- L'Appel souverain (1923)
- La nuit tombe (1928)
- Le Feu sous la cendre (1928)
- Seule, Nelson, 1929, illustrations by Georges Dutriac
- La petite Moune followed by Le Masque (novel), A. Fayard et Cie, Collection "Jeunes femmes & jeunes filles" no. 17 (1930)
- Le Mal d'aimer (1933)
- La Faute d'autrui (1933)
- L'Absence, Plon, 1933
- Ainsi souffla le vent (1934)
- L'Heure décisive, Plon, 1901 (text, via Internet Archive)
- Mon cousin Guy, Plon, 1896; English translation: Little Arlette or my cousin Guy by Francis Furey, Kilner, 1899 (text, via Internet Archive)
- René Orlis
- Rêve blanc, Plon, collection of La Liseuse no. 102, 1929
- Le Rêve de Suzy
- Tout arrive (PDF text, via memoire.arald.org)
- L'Autre Miracle
- Il était une adroite princesse
- Les Deux Visages de l'amour
- Le Chemin qui descend (1916)
- Il faut marier Jean (1925)
- L'Étreinte du passé (1918)
- Les Âmes closes
- Ève et le Serpent, Plon, 1930
