= Gaston Chérau =

French man of letters and journalist

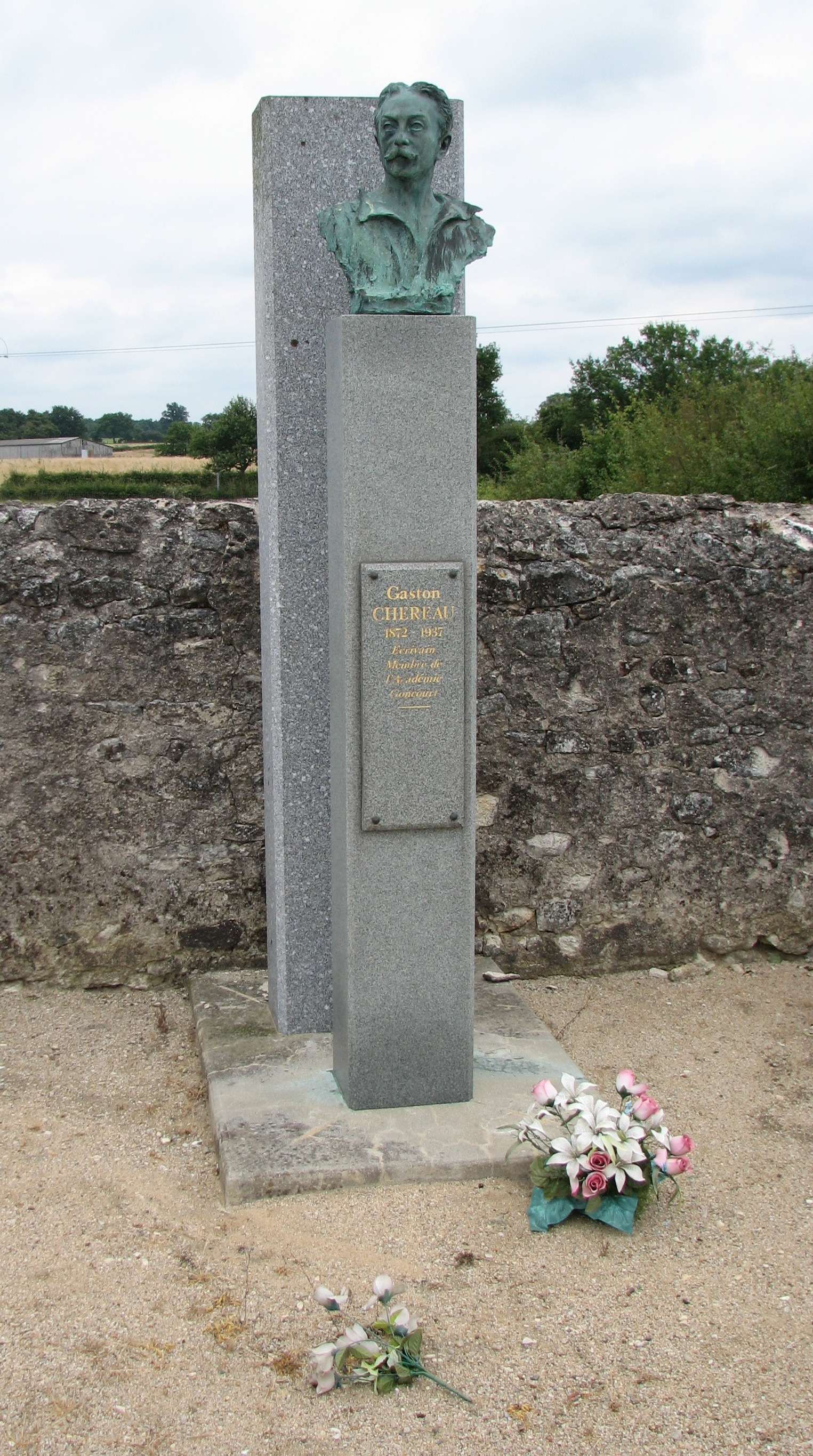
- Gaston Chérau's grave at Prissac (Indre)
- Born: 6 November 1872; Niort
- Died: 20 April 1937 (aged 64); Boston
- Occupations: Writer; Journalist

Signature
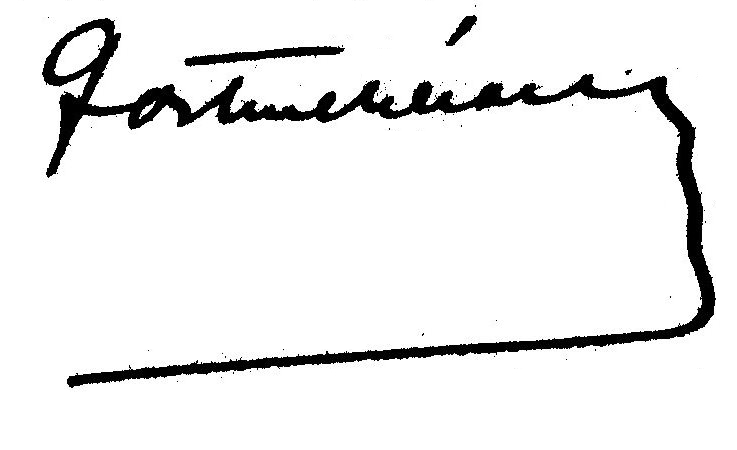

Gaston Chérau (6 November 1872 – 20 April 1937) was a French man of letters and journalist.

== Biography ==
The son of an industrialist, Gaston Chérau who died in Boston during a lecture tour. A journalist and chronicler, he regularly gave the press his impressions of travel.

In 1911, he traveled through Tripolitania during the Italo-Turkish War on behalf of Le Matin newspaper.

In 1914, he was a war reporter for the newspaper L'Illustration in Belgium and the North of France.

A novelist of the province, being influenced by the Berry where he had family roots, stayed a part of his childhood, and where he returned assiduously on vacation in a second home until the end of his life.

He was elected a member of the Académie Goncourt in 1926.

He was also interested in cinema and wrote the dialogues of the film Les Deux mondes (1930) directed by Ewald Andreas Dupont.

== Literary work ==
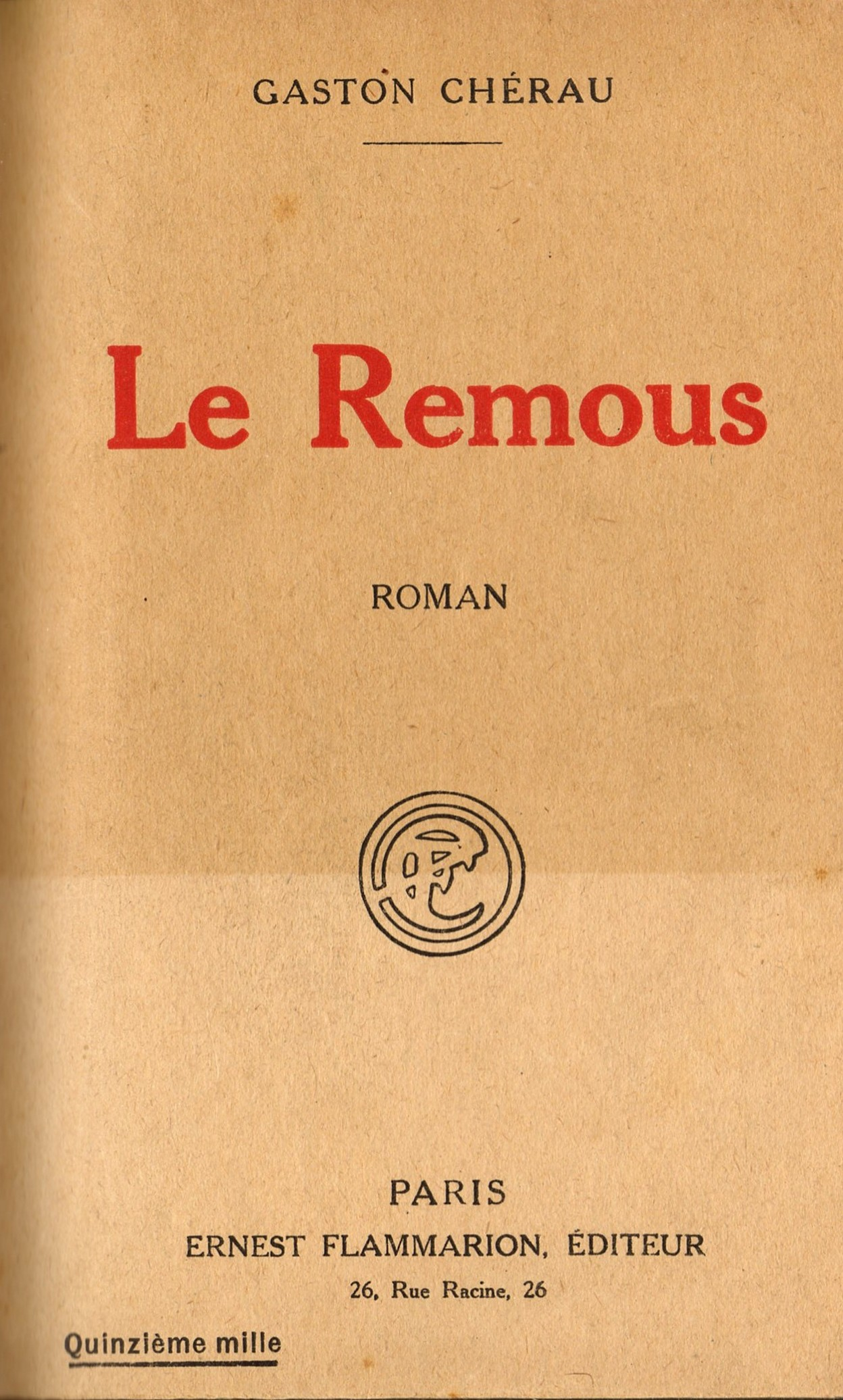
Cover of Le remous

He is the author of about forty novels.

- 1901: Les grandes époques de M. Thébault, Chamuel; Justin Clairbois remained in the state of manuscript
- 1921: Valentine Pacquault is at the same time his greatest success and his most famous work
- Sa destinée, novel
- Concorde !… 6 février 1934
- 1935: Le Pimpet, illustrated tale by Roger Reboussin, Paris, Delagrave
- 1934: Le pays qui a perdu son âme, novel, Paris, Ferenczi
- 1930: Le Flambeau des Riffault, novel, Paris, Calmann-Lévy, Paris, Fasquelle
- 1929: Apprends-moi à être amoureuse, tales, Ferenczi
- 1930: La volupté du mal, novel, Ferenczi
- 1931: Les cercles du printemps, tales, Ferenczi
- La maison du quai, novel
- L'enfant du pays, novel (Éd. L'Illustration, revue La Petite Illustration, four paperbacks: n° 561, 23 January 1932; n° 562, 30 January 1932; n° 563, 6 February 1932; n° 564, 13 February 1932; illustrations by Georges Paul Leroux
- La voix de Werther, tales
- 1932: Celui du Bois Jacqueline, novel, Ferenczi
- Jacques Petitpont, novel for youth
- La saison balnéaire de M. Thebault, novel, Sevin et Rey
- 1903: Monseigneur voyage, novel, Paris, Ollendorf, Stock, 1910, Flammarion, 1920, 1921, 1927, 1930, 1948, 1967, then Ferenczi, 1931); The title character may have been inspired by Charles-Amable de La Tour d'Auvergne Lauraguais (1826–1879) archbishop of Bourges quoted at his death in a letter from Maurice Sand; The planned sequel, entitled L'Apprenti (1902?) was not published
- 1913: Le Monstre, tales, Stock, 1913
- 1906: Champi-Tortu, novel, Olendorff, 1906
- 1910: La prison de verre, sequel to Champi-Tortu, Calmann-Lévy
- 1913: L'Oiseau de proie, novel, Calmann-Lévy
- 1914: Le Remous, sequel to L'Oiseau de proie, Plon
- 1929: Fra Camboulive, novel, Flammarion
- 1927: Valentine Pacquault, novel (Paris, Mornay - Les Beaux Livres, illustrations by Edelman)
- 1923: La Despélouquéro, tales, Plon
- La Maison de Patrice Perrier, novel
- 1926: Le vent du destin, tales, Plon
- 1927: L'égarée sur la route, novel, Ferenczi
- L'ombre du maître, novel
- L'enlèvement de la princesse, novel
- 1934: Chasses et plein air en France, short stories, Stock
- 1937: Séverin Dunastier, novel, Paris, Albin Michel

A generous epicurean, he prefaced the Histoire du cognac by Robert Delamain (Stock, 1935), an archeologist and writer from an old family of merchants in brandy from Jarnac, whose younger brother Jacques (1874–1953), author among others of Portraits d'oiseaux (Stock, 1938 and 1952) was the brother-in-law of the writer Jacques Boutelleau (1884–1968), called Jacques Chardonne.

He wrote a number of works for children such as Jacques Petitpont, roi de Madagascar (J. Ferenczi, 1928, ill. d'Avelot), L'enlèvement de la princesse (Hachette, 1934, ill. André Pécoud ) or Contes et nouvelles de Gascogne (Bibliothèque Nelson illustrée, 1938, ill. Georges Dutriac).

Georges Bernanos described him as a "Maupassant of sub-prefecture", because he had not voted for the Voyage au bout de la nuit by Louis-Ferdinand Céline at the 1932 edition of the prix Goncourt (Le Figaro, 13 December 1932).

It was, at the Goncourt lunches, the most imaginable charming friend. He animated the table with his rapid and colorful stories. He loved to laugh broadly, but one could feel, behind his laughter, a harsh understanding of life. He wrote, in my opinion, two masterpieces: Champi-Tortu and Petit Dagrello. When I told him, he seemed surprised. His tales of hunter and fisherman have an extraordinary flavor. He was a gourmand, and repeatedly regaled us with cheese-cakes from Bélâbre. He knew and loved the peasant world. His death is a real mourning for the Letters and for his colleagues, whom he had pleasure in compelling. We, the "Goncourt", will often think of him, his joyful entrance, his clairvoyant and sensitive eyes

(Léon Daudet, L’Action française, 22 April 1937).

== Sources ==
- Hommage à Gaston Chérau à l'occasion du cinquantenaire de sa mort, in "Bulletin de la Société Historique et Scientifique des Deux-Sèvres", n°1109, tome XX, 1987
- Catalog of the exhibition Gaston Chérau, romancier de la province française, 1872-1937 at the municipal library of Niort, from 24 October 1987 to 15 December 1987, et à la bibliothèque de l'Arsenal, Paris, from 5 February 1988 to 9 April 1988, with bibliography
- Françoise Bertrand-Py, "Argenton et l'œuvre de G. Chérau", in Argenton et son histoire, n° 5, 1988, Cercle d'histoire d'Argenton, Argenton-sur-Creuse
- Madeleine Naud, "Sur les pas de Gaston Chérau", in Argenton et son histoire, n° 9, 1992, Cercle d'histoire d'Argenton, Argenton-sur-Creuse
- Pierre Brunaud and Gérard Coulon, Argenton-sur-Creuse et ses écrivains, 135 p., p. 37-41, Paris, Royer, 1996 ISBN 2-908670-41-0.
- Pierre Schill, Réveiller l’archive d’une guerre coloniale. Photographies et écrits de Gaston Chérau, correspondant de guerre lors du conflit italo-turc pour la Libye (1911-1912), Créaphis, 2018, 480p.et 230 photographies. A book about his two experiences as a war correspondent in Tripolitania and at the beginning of the First World War.
