= Behold Beatrice =

1944 film

- Directed by: Jean de Marguenat
- Written by: Pierre Frondaie (novel); Jean de Marguenat; Charles de Peyret-Chappuis
- Produced by: Georges Maurer; Jacques Sicre
- Starring: Fernand Ledoux; Jules Berry; Renée Faure
- Cinematography: Fred Langenfeld
- Edited by: Raymond Louveau
- Music by: Mario Cazes; André Sablon; Georges Van Parys
- Production company: Société Cinématographique Méditerranéenne de Production
- Distributed by: Union Française de Production Cinématographique
- Release date: 8 March 1944
- Running time: 97 minutes
- Country: France
- Language: French

Behold Beatrice or Beatrice's Temptation (French: Béatrice devant le désir) is a 1944 French drama film directed by Jean de Marguenat and starring Fernand Ledoux, Jules Berry and Renée Faure. It features an early performance by the future star Simone Signoret. It was shot at the Victorine Studios in the southern French city of Nice. The film's sets were designed by the art director Georges Wakhévitch.

== Cast ==
- Fernand Ledoux as Le docteur Mauléon
- Jules Berry as Richelière
- Renée Faure as Béatrice
- Gérard Landry as José
- Thérèse Dorny as Tante Hermance
- Jacques Berthier as Jacques Richelière
- Marie Carlot as Paula
- Jean Barrère
- Henry Bonvallet as Le docteur Lemonsquier
- Mario Cazes as Le violoniste
- Georges Gosset
- Lucy Lancy as Gaby
- Liliane Lonville
- Emma Lyonel as Madame Dourthe
- Jean-Jacques Lécot
- Marfisa as La chanteuse
- Marguerite Mayanne as Madame de Saint-Savin
- Marcelle Naudia as La baronne
- Suzy Pierson as Madame de Wallée
- Robert Pizani as Alfred
- Jacques Sablon
- Maud Saintange
- Simone Signoret as Liliane Moraccini
- Georges Térof as Machonneau

== Bibliography ==
- Goble, Alan. The Complete Index to Literary Sources in Film. Walter de Gruyter, 1999.
- Hayward, Susan. Simone Signoret: The Star as Cultural Sign. A&C Black, 2004.
