= Georges Sibre =

Georges Sibre (date of birth unknown; died 20 November 1941) was a popular French lyricist and librettist for opérettes in the 1920s.

== Operettas ==
- Mariska by Mario Cazes.
- Princesse Nazaline, created on 25 March 1921 at the Eden Théâtre d'Asnières (France).
- Le singe était roi, 24 June 1921 at la Scala (Brussels).

== Melodies ==
- La Folie verte, music by Francis Popy
- Petit Turco, music by Francis Popy
- Nous nous plûmes, music by Harry Fragson, revived in concert by Marie-Paule Belle
- Sur un air de vielle, music by J. Taillefer
