= Unharness the Horses, Guys =

Ukrainian folk song

"Rozpriahajte, chloptsi, koni"

Song
- Language: Ukrainian
- English title: Unharness the Horses, Boys
- Written: 19th century
- Released: 1935
- Genre: Ukrainian folk music
- Producers: Dmytro Balatsky; Nestor Horodovenko

A performance of the song can be heard at 17:30 in the 1939 Soviet film Tractor Drivers

"Rozpriahajte, chloptsi, koni" (Ukrainian: «Розпрягайте, хлопці, коні» [rozprʲɐˈɦɑjte ˈxlɔpts⁽ʲ⁾i ˈkɔn⁽ʲ⁾i], lit. '"Unharness the Horses, Boys"') is a Ukrainian folk song. The song is known in the records of folklorists since the 19th century. In the Soviet Union, the song became widely known after the release of the 1939 film Tractor Drivers.

== History ==
In the 20th century, the folklorist and choir conductor Dmytro Balatsky recorded and edited the song. In 1935, it was released on gramophone record by the State Honored Choir Chapel of Ukraine "Trembita" under the direction of Nestor Horodovenko. In 1935, it was performed by the Red Army Choir under the direction of Alexander Vasilyevich Alexandrov.

According to Ukrainian folklorist Leonid Kaufman, the folk song was written by Dmytro Balatsky in 1918. This version was refuted by Andrii Kinko, proving that the song was known in the records of folklorists as early as the 19th century. Local historian Viktor Yalanskyi in the book Nestor and Halyna, published in 1999, cites the assumption of Nestor Makhno's wife Halyna Kuzmenko that the author of this work is Ivan Negrebytskyi, a Makhnovist from Poltava.

Over time, the work was translated for the military orchestras of the Red Army and the Armed Forces of Ukraine, such as "Ukrainian March" by Simon Chernetsky. In the 1970s, a version of the song performed by the Kuban Cossack Choir with the refrain "Marusya once, two, three viburnums" became widely known. The original version, however, did not include this refrain.

== Derivative works ==
With the beginning of World War I, the Russian writer Vladimir Gilyarovsky penned the text of the 1915 song "March of the Siberian Regiment" to the tune of "Unhitch the Horses, Boys." Later, the same melody was used in the Russian Civil War song "Po dolinam i po vzgoriam".

== Lyrics ==
Ukrainian original

Розпрягайте, хлопці, коні,
Та й лягайте спочивать,
А я піду в сад зелений
В сад криниченьку копать.

Копав, копав криниченьку
У вишневому саду.
Чи не вийде дівчинонька
Рано вранці по воду?

Вийшла, вийшла дівчинонька
В сад вишневий воду брать,
А за нею козаченько
Веде коня напувать.

Просив, просив відеречко -
Вона йому не дала,
Дарив, дарив їй колечко -
Вона його не взяла.

Знаю, знаю, дівчинонько,
Чим я тебе розгнівив:
Що я вчора ізвечора
Із другою говорив.

Вона ростом невеличка,
Ще й літами молода,
Руса коса до пояса,
В косі стрічка голуба.

Romanization of Ukrainian

Rozpriahajte, chlopci, koni,
Ta j liahajte spočyvať,
A ja pidu v sad zelenyj
V sad krynyčeńku kopať.

Kopav, kopav krynyčeńku
U vyšnevomu sadu.
Čy ne vyjde divčynońka
Rano vranci po vodu?

Vyjšla, vyjšla divčynońka
V sad vyšnevyj vodu brať,
A za neju kozačeńko
Vede konia napuvať.

Prosyv, prosyv viderečko -
Vona jomu ne dala,
Daryv, daryv ïj kolečko -
Vona joho ne vziala.

Znaju, znaju, divčynońko,
Čym ja tebe rozhnivyv:
Ščo ja včora izvečora
Iz druhoju hovoryv.

Vona rostom nevelyčka,
Šče j litamy moloda,
Rusa kosa do pojasa,
V kosi strička holuba.

English translation

Unhitch the horses, boys,
And go to bed to rest,
And I will go to the green garden
To the green garden to dig a well.

I dug, dug the well
In the cherry orchard.
Will the little girl come,
Early in the morning for water?

The girl came, came,
To take water in the cherry orchard,
And behind her the Cossack
Leads the horse to the water.

He asked, he asked for a bucket -
She didn't give it to him
He gave, gave her a ring -
She didn't take it.

I know, I know, girl
Why I made you angry:
That I yesterday evening
Spoke with another girl.

She is small in stature,
Still young,
Has a blonde braid to the waist,
A sky blue ribbon in the braid.

== See also ==
- Lyubo, bratsy, lyubo
