= King of the Hotel =

1932 film

- Directed by: Carmine Gallone
- Written by: Henry Kistemaeckers (play); Henri-Georges Clouzot; Serge Véber
- Starring: Jules Berry; Betty Stockfeld; Simone Simon
- Cinematography: Heinrich Balasch; Gérard Perrin
- Edited by: Lothar Wolff
- Music by: Raoul Moretti
- Production companies: Gainsborough Pictures; Gaumont
- Distributed by: Les Films Georges Muller
- Release date: 1932
- Running time: 84 minutes
- Countries: France; United Kingdom
- Language: French

King of the Hotel (French:Le roi des palaces) is a 1932 British-French comedy film directed by Carmine Gallone and starring Jules Berry, Betty Stockfeld and Armand Dranem. It was based on a play by Henry Kistemaeckers. The film's sets were designed by the art director Serge Piménoff.

A separate English-language version King of the Ritz was also made.

== Cast ==
- Jules Berry as Claude
- Betty Stockfeld as Betty
- Armand Dranem as King Stanislas de Poldavie
- Simone Simon as Victoire
- Georges Morton as Prefect of police
- Guy Sloux as Teddy Smith
- Alexander D'Arcy as Alonzo
- Emmanuel Ligny as Jimmy
- José Noguéro
- Suzette O'Nil
- Simone Chobillon

== Bibliography ==
- Crisp, G.C. Genre, Myth, and Convention in the French Cinema, 1929–1939. Indiana University Press, 2002.
