= Au-delà des lois humaines =

1920 film

- Directed by: Marcel Dumont and Gaston Roudès
- Written by: Daniel Jourda
- Starring: Rachel Devirys
- Distributed by: Gallo Film
- Release date: 1920
- Country: France
- Language: Silent film

Au-delà des lois humaines is a 1920 French silent film directed by Marcel Dumont and Gaston Roudès. The film was based on a novel by Daniel Jourda.

== Cast ==
- Rachel Devirys
- Germaine Sablon
- Georges Saillard
- Maurice Schutz
- Jean Signoret
- Nyota Nyoka
- Paul Robert
