= André Sablon =

French composer

André Eugène Sablon (22 May 1896, Paris – 9 August 1947, Paris) was a 20th-century French composer.

The son of Charles Sablon (composer born in 1871), he was also the brother of Germaine Sablon (singer and actress), Jean Sablon (singer) and Marcel Sablon, director of Les Ballets de Monte Carlo.

Sablon is buried at Montparnasse Cemetery.

== Film scores ==
- 1931: The Polish Jew, by Jean Kemm
- 1932: Montmartre, village d'amour (documentary)
- 1944: Behold Beatrice, by Jean de Marguenat.
