= Paris-Deauville =

- Directed by: Jean Delannoy
- Written by: Paul Blanchart
- Starring: Marguerite Moreno; Monique Rolland; Germaine Sablon
- Cinematography: Robert Lefebvre; Joseph-Louis Mundwiller
- Edited by: Jean Delannoy
- Music by: Lucien Wurmser
- Production company: Lory Film
- Distributed by: Éclair-Journal
- Release date: 1934
- Running time: 90 minutes
- Country: France
- Language: French

Paris-Deauville is a 1934 French comedy film directed by Jean Delannoy and starring Marguerite Moreno, Monique Rolland and Germaine Sablon.

The film's sets were designed by the art director Roger Caccia.

== Cast ==
- Marguerite Moreno as La duchesse de Latour Lupé
- Monique Rolland as Gilberte
- Germaine Sablon as Baronne Paulette de Sempé
- André Roanne as Jacques Duplan
- Armand Bernard as Sosthène
- Tichadel as Cruchadouze, le compositeur gaffeur
- Georges Bever as Joseph

== Bibliography ==
- Bertram M. Gordon. War Tourism: Second World War France from Defeat and Occupation to the Creation of Heritage. Cornell University Press, Nov 2018.
