= House in the Sun =

1929 film

- Directed by: Gaston Roudès
- Starring: France Dhélia; Gaston Jacquet; Georges Melchior
- Production company: Franco Films
- Release date: 30 August 1929
- Country: France
- Languages: Silent; French intertitles

House in the Sun (French: La maison au soleil) is a 1929 French silent film directed by Gaston Roudès and starring France Dhélia, Gaston Jacquet and Georges Melchior.

== Cast ==
- France Dhélia as Madeleine
- Gaston Jacquet as Marcel Pignaire
- Georges Melchior as Gérard Göel
- Annie Grazia as Janic
- Jane Loury
- Henri Bosc

== Bibliography ==
- Robert B. Connelly. The Silents: Silent Feature Films, 1910-36, Volume 40, Issue 2. December Press, 1998.
