= France Dhélia =

French actress (1894–1964)

- Born: Franceline Berthe Léontine Délia Benoît; November 9, 1894; Saint-Lubin-en-Vergonnois, Loir-et-Cher, French Third Republic
- Died: May 6, 1964 (aged 69); Paris, France
- Occupation: Actress
- Years active: 1912–1939

France Dhélia (born Franceline Berthe Léontine Délia Benoît; November 9, 1894 – May 6, 1964) was a French film actress. Dhélia appeared in more than forty films, mostly in the silent era. Many of her appearances were in the films of the director Gaston Roudès.

== Selected filmography ==
- House in the Sun (1929)
- Méphisto (1931)
- Roger la Honte (1933)

== Bibliography ==
- Oscherwitz, Dayna & Higgins, Maryellen. The A to Z of French Cinema. Scarecrow Press, 2009.
