= Carnegie Hall (film) =

1947 film by Edgar George Ulmer

- Theatrical release poster
- Directed by: Edgar G. Ulmer
- Screenplay by: Karl Kamb
- Story by: Seena Owen
- Produced by: William LeBaron; Boris Morros; Samuel Rheiner (supervising producer)
- Starring: Marsha Hunt; William Prince; Walter Damrosch; Bruno Walter; Lily Pons; Gregor Piatigorsky; Risë Stevens; Artur Rodziński; Arthur Rubenstein; Jan Peerce; Ezio Pinza; Vaughn Monroe; Jascha Heifetz; Fritz Reiner; Leopold Stokowski; Harry James; Frank McHugh; Martha O'Driscoll; Hans Jaray; Olin Downes; Joseph Buloff
- Cinematography: William Miller
- Edited by: Fred R. Feitshans Jr.
- Production company: Federal Films
- Distributed by: United Artists
- Release date: May 2, 1947
- Running time: 144 minutes
- Country: United States
- Language: English
- Budget: $1.5 million

Carnegie Hall is a 1947 American musical drama film directed by Edgar G. Ulmer and starring Marsha Hunt and William Prince. The film was produced by Federal Films and released by United Artists.

Ulmer directed Carnegie Hall with the help of conductor Fritz Reiner, godfather of Ulmer's daughter Arianné. The New York City concert venue Carnegie Hall serves as the film's setting for the plot and performances. A tribute to classical music and Carnegie Hall, the film features appearances by some of the prominent music figures of the 20th century. Based on a story by silent movie actress Seena Owen, Carnegie Hall follows the life of Irish immigrant Nora Ryan who arrives in the U.S. just as the grand concert hall is opened in 1891, and her life is intertwined with the performers, conductors, aspiring artists and employees who work there. The plot serves as a thread to connect the music performances.

== Plot ==
Nora, a dresser at Carnegie Hall, is cleaning in preparation for the next evening's concert. Walter Damrosch is rehearsing his Symphony Society of New York in Tchaikovsky's Piano Concerto No. 1. Substitute pianist Tony Salerno begins deliberately changing the accents and rhythms to fit his own interpretation and after a tense exchange, Tony walks off the stage. Nora entreats Tony to apologize to Damrosch, who had admitted her to a Carnegie Hall performance when she was a child.

Nora and Tony are soon married, and a baby arrives. One night after an argument with Nora, a drunk Tony falls down the stairs and is killed. Several years later, Tony, Jr. is a promising piano player, and Nora takes a job to finance his musical training. As Tony reaches adulthood, he shows a tendency to improvise when playing classical music. He falls for Ruth, a backup singer with Vaughn Monroe's big-band orchestra, and Monroe offers Tony a job with his band. Nora beseeches Tony to decline Monroe's offer because he is a classical artist and not just another popular musician. However, he refuses to accept that playing with Monroe would compromise his standards.

Years pass and Tony has become a successful recording artist but remains estranged from his mother. Ruth informs Nora that Tony left her suddenly after an argument. Nora seizes the opportunity to reconcile with her son and plans to fly to Chicago with Ruth. However, Tony tricks them into coming to Carnegie Hall to see him. They are surprised when Tony leads the orchestra, and the audience cheers. Tony smiles from the stage at Nora and Ruth.

== Cast ==
- Marsha Hunt as Nora Ryan
- William Prince as Tony Salerno Jr.
- Frank McHugh as John Donovan
- Martha O'Driscoll as Ruth Hainess
- Hans Jaray as Tony Salerno Sr.
- Joseph Buloff as Anton Tribik
- Alfonso D'Artega as Tchaikovsky
- Cloris Leachman as Dancing Nightclub Patron – Vaughn Monroe sequence (uncredited)
- Barbara Woodell as Nellie – Irish Charwoman (uncredited)
- Emile Boreo as Henry

=== Music guests ===
- Walter Damrosch (conductor)
- Olin Downes (music critic)
- Jascha Heifetz (violinist)
- Harry James (trumpeter)
- Vaughn Monroe (band leader)
- Jan Peerce (vocalist)
- Gregor Piatigorsky (cellist)
- Ezio Pinza (vocalist)
- Lily Pons (vocalist)
- Fritz Reiner (conductor)
- Artur Rodziński (conductor)
- Arthur Rubinstein (pianist)
- Risë Stevens (vocalist)
- Leopold Stokowski (conductor)
- Bruno Walter (conductor)
- New York Philharmonic Quintet (John Corigliano Sr., William Lincer, Nadia Reisenberg, Leonard Rose, Michael Rosenker)

== Music ==
- Richard Wagner – Prelude from Die Meistersinger von Nürnberg – New York Philharmonic, Bruno Walter, conductor
- Léo Delibes – "Bell Song" from opera Lakmé – sung by Lily Pons
- Camille Saint-Saëns – "The Swan" from The Carnival of the Animals – Gregor Piatigorsky, cello
- Georges Bizet – "Seguidilla" from Carmen – sung by Risë Stevens (mezzo-soprano)
- Ludwig van Beethoven – Symphony No. 5 (excerpts) – New York Philharmonic, Artur Rodziński, conductor
- Frédéric Chopin – Polonaise héroïque – Arthur Rubinstein, piano
- Manuel de Falla – "Ritual Fire Dance" – Arthur Rubinstein, piano
- Eduardo di Capua – "’O sole mio" – sung by Jan Peerce (tenor)
- Giuseppe Verdi – "Il lacerato spirito" from Simon Boccanegra – sung by Ezio Pinza (bass)
- Wolfgang Amadeus Mozart – "Fin ch'han dal vino" from Don Giovanni – sung by Ezio Pinza (bass)
- Sam Coslow – "Beware, My Heart" – sung by Vaughn Monroe
- Frank L. Ryerson/Wilton Moore – "The Pleasure's All Mine" – sung by Vaughn Monroe
- Pyotr Ilyich Tchaikovsky – Violin Concerto in D major, first movement – New York Philharmonic, Fritz Reiner, conductor, Jasha Heifetz, violin
- Pyotr Ilyich Tchaikovsky – Symphony No. 5, second movement – New York Philharmonic, Leopold Stokowski, conductor
- Hal Borne – "Brown Danube" – Harry James, trumpet
- Mischa Portnoff – "The 57th Street Rhapsody" (composed for the film) – pianist uncertain; Portnoff's hands are filmed playing the climactic piece.
