= Pierre Alcover =

French actor (1893–1957)

- Born: 14 March 1893; Châtellerault, Vienne, France
- Died: 14 November 1957 (aged 64); Paris, France
- Occupation: actor
- Years active: 1918–1943 (in film)

Pierre Alcover (14 March 1893 – 14 November 1957) was a French stage and film actor.

He starred in 40 films between 1918 and 1943.

In 1920 he starred in the film Champi-Tortu. One of his most notable performances was in Marcel L'Herbier's 1928 film L'Argent, as the corrupt banker Saccard.

He was the second husband of the film actress Gabrielle Colonna-Romano, and they are buried together in the cimetière de Rueil-Malmaison.

== Selected filmography ==
- Marion Delorme (1918)
- L'Hirondelle et la Mésange (1920)
- En plongée (1926)
- L'Argent (1928)
- La Petite Lise (Little Lise) (1930)
- Le Mariage de Mlle Beulemans (The Marriage of Mademoiselle Beulemans) (1932)
- Criminal (1933)
- Theodore and Company (1933)
- Bourrasque (1935)
- Deuxième bureau (Second Bureau) (1935)
- In the Service of the Tsar (1936)
- Donogoo (1936)
- La Citadelle du silence (The Citadel of Silence) (1937)
- Un carnet de bal (Life Dances On) (1937)
- Le Messager (The Messenger) (1937)
- L'Homme de nulle part (The Man from Nowhere) (1937)
- La Rue sans joie (Street Without Joy) (1938)
- Nights of Princes (1938)
- Ernest the Rebel (1938)
- Le Colonel Chabert (1943)
