= Vidocq (1923 film) =

1923 film

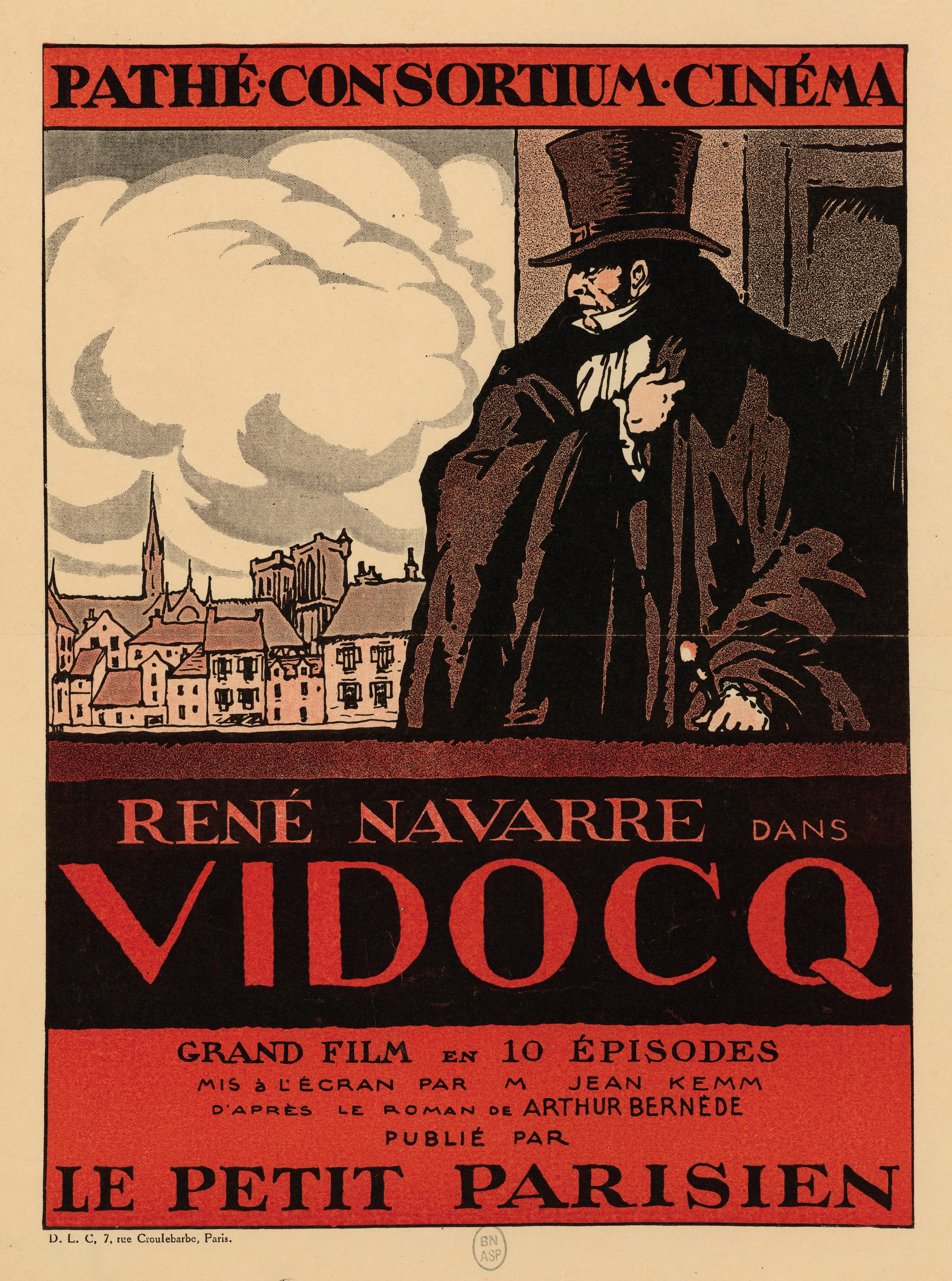
- Directed by: Jean Kemm
- Written by: Jean Kemm
- Based on: Vidocq by Arthur Bernède
- Produced by: Louis Nalpas
- Starring: René Navarre; Elmire Vautier; Rachel Devirys
- Cinematography: Albert Duverger; Paul Guichard
- Production company: Société des Cinéromans
- Distributed by: Pathé Consortium Cinéma
- Release date: 23 February 1923
- Country: France
- Languages: Silent; French intertitles

Vidocq is a 1923 French historical drama film directed by Jean Kemm and starring René Navarre, Elmire Vautier and Rachel Devirys. It is based on the novel of the same title by Arthur Bernède. The film's sets were designed by the art director Louis Nalpas.

== Cast ==
- René Navarre as François Vidocq
- Elmire Vautier as Manon-la-blonde
- Rachel Devirys as Yolande de la Roche Bernard
- Genica Missirio as L'Aristo
- Dolly Davis as Marie-Thérèse de Champtocé
- Georges Deneubourg as Le baron Pasquier
- Geo Laby as Aubin Dermont / Tambour
- Jacques Plet as Bibi la Grillade
- Albert Bras as Champtocé
- Maud Fabris as La chanoinesse
- Paulet as M. Henry
- Andre Pocalas as Coco Lacour

== Bibliography ==
- Goble, Alan. The Complete Index to Literary Sources in Film. Walter de Gruyter, 1999.
- Rège, Philippe. Encyclopedia of French Film Directors, Volume 1. Scarecrow Press, 2009.
