= Rachel Devirys =

French actress (1890–1983)

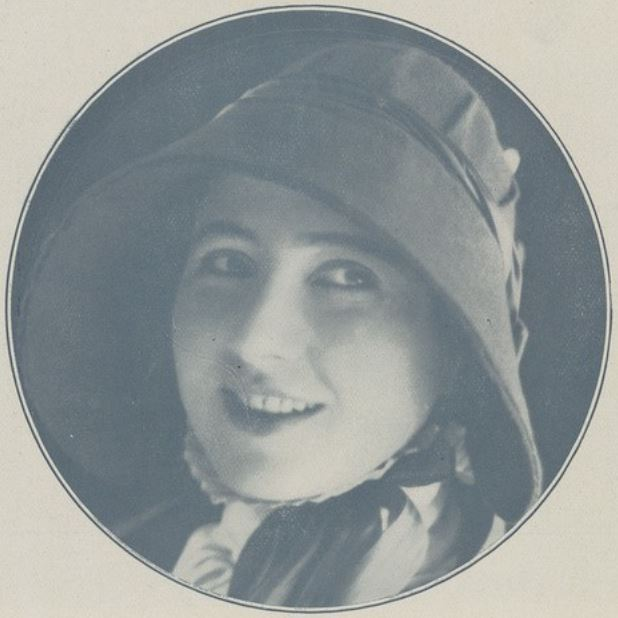
- Rachel Devirys in Vidocq (1923)
- Born: Rachel Itzkovitz; 28 February 1890; Simferopol, Crimea (then part of Russia, now part of Ukraine)
- Died: 16 May 1983 (aged 93); Nice, France
- Occupation: actress
- Years active: 1917—1956

Rachel Devirys (28 February 1890 – 16 May 1983) was a French film actress born in the Crimea, Russian Empire (now Ukraine). She starred in some 50 films between 1916 and 1956.

Born Rachel Itzkovitz, in 1916 she played "Madelon", the name role in a popular song of World War I.

== Partial filmography ==
- Rita (1917)
- La grande vedette (1917)
- Le retour aux champs (1918) - Mariette
- L'accusé (1918)
- La nouvelle aurore (1919) - Nina Noha
- Celle qui n'a pas dit son nom (1919)
- Au-delà des lois humaines (1920) - Nadia Navinska
- Le doute (1921)
- Prisca (1921)
- Maître Évora (1922)
- La voix de l'océan (1922) - Ethel Devirys
- Vidocq (1923) - Yolande de la Roche Bernard
- Para toda la vida (1923) - Euphémia
- Les deux baisers (1924)
- Faces of Children (1925) - Jeanne Dutois, zweite Frau Amslers
- Monte Carlo (1925) - Madame de Fontanes
- Le château de la mort lente (1926) - la comtesse Maud
- Le berceau de dieu (1926) - Hérodiade
- La nuit de la revanche (1926)
- La bonne hôtesse (1926) - Marinette
- Morgane, the Enchantress (1928) - Madame Le Foulon
- Croquette (1928) - Lola Morelli
- L'emprise (1929)
- La vocation (1929)
- L'appel du large (1929)
- Maternité (1930) - Louise
- Bombs on Monte Carlo (1931) - Diana
- Captain Craddock (1931) - Diane
- Ariane, jeune fille russe (1932) - Aunt Warwara
- Love and Luck (1932) - Nina Delaporte
- Je vous aimerai toujours (1933) - Madame de Saint-Obin
- Die Abenteuer des Königs Pausole (1933) - Perchuqué
- Les aventures du roi Pausole (1933) - Dame Perchuque
- Crainquebille (1934) - Madame Laure
- Famille nombreuse (1934)
- Vertigo (1935) - La princesse Koupiska
- Les dieux s'amusent (1935)
- L'école des vierges (1935)
- Bach the Detective (1936) - La maîtresse de maison
- Les demi-vierges (1936) - Mme de Rouvre
- Gigolette (1937)
- Colonel Durand (1948) - Mme Nieburger
- Piège à hommes (1949)
- Nous avons tous fait la même chose (1950)
- Les Enfants terribles (1950)
- Trois de la Canebière (1955) - Me Olivier
- Gervaise (1956) - Mme Fauconnier
