= René Navarre =

French actor

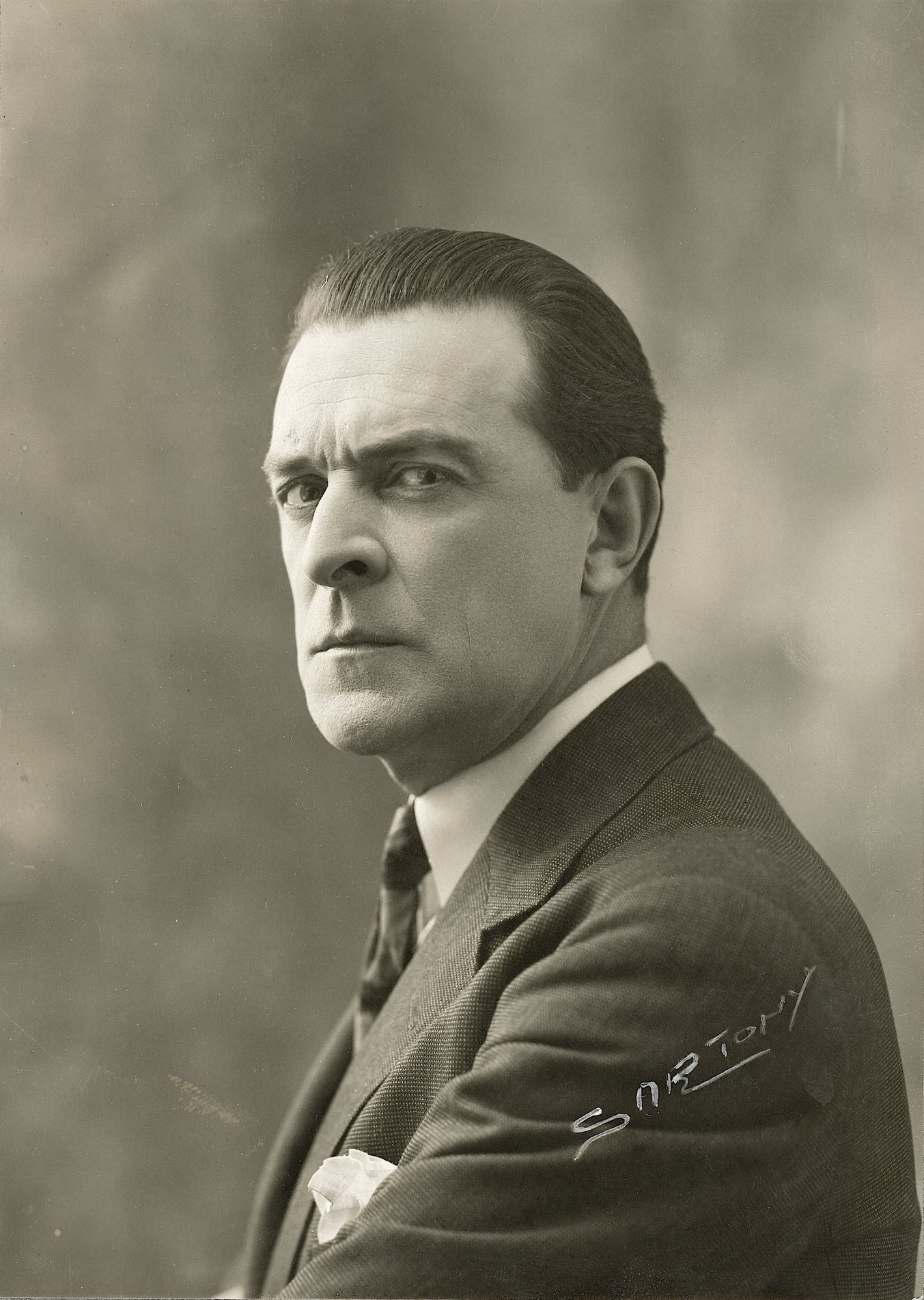
- Born: 8 June 1877; Limoges, Haute-Vienne, French Third Republic
- Died: 8 February 1968 (aged 90); Azay-sur-Cher, Indre-et-Loire, France
- Occupation: Actor
- Years active: 1910–1946

René Navarre (8 July 1877 – 8 February 1968) was a French actor of the silent era. He appeared in 109 films between 1910 and 1946, and was often credited simply as Navarre. His most famous role was probably the master criminal Fantômas.

== Selected filmography ==
- La Hantise (1912)
- Fantômas (1913)
- Ferragus (1923)
- Vidocq (1923)
- Jean Chouan (1926)
- Belphégor (1927)
- The Veil Dancer (1929)
- Prince Jean (1934)
- Mam'zelle Spahi (1934)
- Judex (1934)
- Chéri-Bibi (1938)
- His Uncle from Normandy (1939)
- Radio Surprises (1940)
