= Marcel Dumont =

French film director

- Born: Marcel Félix Georges Dumont; 8 June 1885; 4th arrondissement of Paris
- Died: 10 February 1951 (aged 65); 10th arrondissement of Paris
- Occupation: Film director

Marcel Dumont (real name Marcel Félix Georges Dumont) (8 June 1885 – 10 February 1951) was a French film director.

== Filmography ==
- 1920 : Irène
- 1920 : Au-delà des lois humaines
- 1921 : La Proie
- 1921 : Les Élus de la Mer with Gaston Roudès
- 1923 : Le Juge d'instruction
- 1925 : L'Éveil with Gaston Roudès
- 1925 : Les élus de la mer
- 1927 : Le Dédale with Gaston Roudès
- 1929 : La maison des hommes vivants
- 1932 : L'Affaire de la rue de Lourcine with Serjius
