= Champi-Tortu =

1921 film

- Directed by: Jacques de Baroncelli
- Written by: Gaston Chérau
- Starring: Pierre Alcover
- Distributed by: Gallo Film
- Release date: 1921
- Country: France
- Language: Silent film

Champi-Tortu is a 1921 French silent film directed by Jacques de Baroncelli. The film was based on a novel by Gaston Chérau.

== Cast ==
- Pierre Alcover
- René Alexandre
- Cosnard
- Paul Duc
- Henri Janvier
- Paul Jorge
- Maria Kouznetzoff
- André René
- Madame Trefeuil
