= Flipotte =

1920 film

- Directed by: Jacques de Baroncelli
- Written by: Henry Kistemaeckers (novel), Jacques de Baroncelli
- Starring: Gabriel Signoret
- Cinematography: Alphonse Gibory
- Distributed by: Le Film d'Art
- Release date: 1920
- Country: France
- Language: Silent film

Flipotte is a 1920 French silent film directed by Jacques de Baroncelli. It is based on a novel by Henry Kistemaeckers

== Cast ==
- Gabriel Signoret ... Flipotte
- Suzanne Bianchetti
- Andrée Brabant
- Jeanne Cheirel
