= Arthur Tracy =

American actor (1899–1997)

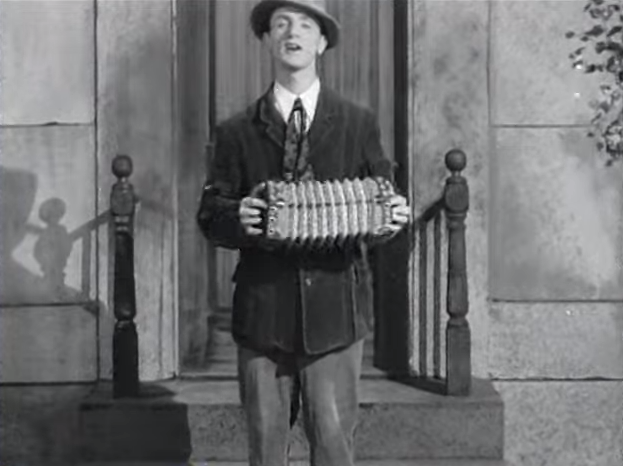
- Tracy playing concertina, from Romantic Melodies (1932)

Background information
- Also known as: The Street Singer
- Born: Abba Avrom Tracovutsky; June 25, 1899; Kamenetz-Podolsky, Russian Empire (now Ukraine)
- Died: October 5, 1997 (aged 98) Manhattan, New York, United States
- Genres: Traditional pop, vocal
- Occupations: Singer, actor
- Instruments: Vocals, accordion, concertina
- Years active: 1920s–1930s, 1982

Romantic Melodies (1932)

Arthur Tracy (born Abba Avrom Tracovutsky; June 25, 1899 – October 5, 1997) was an American vocalist and actor, billed as The Street Singer. His performances in theatre, films and radio, along with his recordings, brought him international fame in the 1930s. Late evening radio listeners tuned in to hear announcer David Ross' introduction ("Round the corner and down your way comes The Street Singer") and Tracy's familiar theme song, "Marta, Rambling Rose of the Wildwood."

== Biography ==
Born Abba Avrom Tracovutsky in Kamenetz-Podolsky, Russian Empire (now Ukraine), he emigrated to the United States with his parents, listed as Mordeche and Fannie Trasowitzkey, and sisters, in October 1906; they were steerage passengers on the SS Blücher, from Hamburg to New York. His brother was born in 1907. After their release from the Ellis Island Immigrant station, they settled in Philadelphia. Naturalized in 1913, Tracy's parents became known as Morris and Fannie Tracy.

In 1917, Tracy graduated from Central High School. He began studying architecture at the University of Pennsylvania, but dropped out to become a professional singer. He began singing part-time in the Yiddish theatre, minstrel shows and vaudeville while working as a furniture salesman.

After moving to New York City in 1924, he appeared regularly in vaudeville, joined the Blossom Time touring company, and appeared in various New York amateur revues, where he was seen by William S. Paley who offered him a 15-minute CBS radio program.

To avoid embarrassing his family if his show failed and to prevent being blackballed from future vaudeville bookings for having appeared on radio, Tracy decided to make his identity a mystery and borrowed a billing from the title of Frederick Lonsdale's musical The Street Singer (1924). Listeners demanded to know his identity, but it was not revealed until five months after his 1931 debut on CBS. The following year he went to Hollywood to appear in The Big Broadcast (1932) with other radio stars, including Bing Crosby, Kate Smith, and the Boswell Sisters. In 1933, he performed at Franklin D. Roosevelt's first inauguration.

In the short film Ramblin' Round Radio Row #5 (1933), his last name is pronounced "Treecy".

Tracy gave his romantic interpretation to such songs as "When I Grow Too Old to Dream", "I'll See You Again", "Trees", "Everything I Have Is Yours", "Red Sails in the Sunset", "Harbor Lights", "The Whistling Waltz", and "Danny Boy". His September 1935 recording of "East of the Sun (and West of the Moon)" is among the first of that much recorded song. At almost every live performance he sang his theme song, "Marta".

Tracy appeared at the London Palladium in July 1935 and he had an extended stay in UK. He toured the variety stages extensively over the next few years and appeared on radio. During the next four years, he made four films in the UK. He returned to the USA in July 1939. In 1967, Tracy was on holiday in the UK and he was persuaded to make a five-week variety tour appearing in Nottingham, Birmingham and Liverpool.

In 1978, Arthur Tracy was crowned King of the Beaux Arts Ball. He presided with Queen Hope Hampton, the one-time silent screen star.

Arthur Tracy's 1937 recording of "Pennies from Heaven" was chosen from hundreds of versions for the 1981 movie of that name, with Vernel Bagneris lip-synching to Tracy's voice. The film brought Tracy out of retirement, and at age 82 he returned as a cabaret singer at The Cookery in Greenwich Village in 1982. This brought a favorable review in The New York Times from John Wilson, who wrote that his vocalizing had "a delightful patina of period charm", adding that Tracy was "a spellbinder, setting a mood and scene, disarming the doubters by admitting that 'I always put all the schmalz I had into my songs.'"

In 1996, Tracy was granted the Ellis Island Medal of Honor. He died in Manhattan, New York, on October 5, 1997, at the age of 98. His autobiography, The Street Singer, was published posthumously.

== Films ==
- Crossing Delancey (1988) (as Arthur Tracey) .... Pickle Stand Customer #1
- Pennies From Heaven (1981)
- Follow Your Star (1938) .... Arthur Tee
- The Street Singer (1937) .... Richard King:... aka Interval for Romance
- Command Performance (1937) .... Street Singer
- Limelight (1936) .... Bob Grant

... aka Backstage (USA)
... aka Street Singer's Serenade

- Flirtation (1934)
- The Big Broadcast (1932)

== Listen to ==
- WFMU: Antique Music Phonograph Program: Arthur Tracy sings "Marta" (39 minutes in)
