= The Street Singer (1937 film) =

1937 film

- Lobby card of Margaret Lockwood & Arthur Tracy
- Directed by: Jean de Marguenat
- Screenplay by: Reginald Arkell
- Story by: Jean de Marguenat; Paul Schiller
- Produced by: Dora Nirva
- Starring: Arthur Tracy; Arthur Riscoe; Margaret Lockwood
- Cinematography: Henry Harris
- Edited by: Douglas Myers
- Music by: Rawicz and Landauer; Lew Stone (musical director)
- Production company: British National Films
- Distributed by: Associated British Picture Corporation (UK)
- Release date: December 1937 (UK)
- Running time: 86 minutes
- Country: United Kingdom
- Language: English

The Street Singer (aka, Interval for Romance) is a 1937 British musical film directed by Jean de Marguenat and starring Arthur Tracy, Margaret Lockwood and Arthur Riscoe. The screenplay concerns a famous musician who is mistaken for a street singer. It was an early role for Margaret Lockwood. The film's sets were designed by the art director Erwin Scharf.

== Plot ==
Richard, a famous musical comedy star, is mistaken for a beggar by an orphan, Jenny.

== Cast ==
- Arthur Tracy as Richard King
- Arthur Riscoe as Sam Green
- Margaret Lockwood as Jenny Green
- Hugh Wakefield as Hugh Newman
- Emile Boreo as Luigi
- Ellen Pollock as Gloria Weston
- Wally Patch as Policeman
- Ian McLean as Police Inspector
- John Deverell as James
- Rawicz and Landauer as Specialty Act
- Lew Stone and His Band

== Production ==
The film was produced by a woman, Dora Nirva, making her the first woman to be credited as producer of a British film.

The movie was devised as a vehicle for Arthur Tracy. Margaret Lockwood was borrowed from Gainsborough to play the female lead. Her biographer wrote "Margaret’s role reduced her to little more than a 'feed' for Tracy as a girl busker who mistakes him for a tramp and takes him under her wing."

The movie was known as Interval for Romance and was filmed in late 1936. It was the first in a series of productions for British National.

== Reception ==
Variety called it "a Prince Charming story which should have considerable appeal to the populace."

Picturegoer called it "an unpretentious British musical."
