= Rifle troops =

The rifles troops (Russian: стрелковые войска, English transliteration - strelkovie voiska) often called rifle troops in English, is the Russian infantry combat Arm of Service that, since 1857, had been armed with rifles (currently assault rifles) as their primary firearm. The name applies equally to the Arm of Service and its individual units (rifles Russian: стрелки) or an individual soldier (Russian: стрелок).

== Imperial Rifles troops ==
By the First World War the Imperial Russian Army had a large number of territorially based rifle corps (not to be confused with the corps as a formation), including:

- Leib-Guard Rifles (Life Guard Rifles)- four regiments (The Life-Guards Yegersky Regiment, although a light infantry unit in name, was numbered among the guard and not the rifles regiments)
- Dismounted rifles regiments of the Guard cavalry divisions (three)
- The Rifles Corps (32 regiments and the Rifles officer school regiment)
- Finnish Rifles Corps (24 regiments) - consisted of Russians living in Finland
- Caucasus Rifles Corps (24 regiments)
- Siberian Rifles Corps (88 regiments, and 4 combined rifles regiments)
- Turkestan Rifles Corps (40 regiments)
- Dismounted cavalry rifles (17 regiments)
- Caucasian cavalry rifles regiment
- Trans-Amur mounted rifles regiment (Russian: Заамурский конный стрелковый полк)(This was a Cossack border guard regiment)
- Polish Rifles (six battalions)
- Czechoslovak Rifles (four regiments)
- Armenian volunteer rifles druzhinas (six battalions)
- Latvian Rifles (eight regiments)
- Georgian volunteer rifles druzhinas (two battalions combined into a regiment)

== Soviet rifles troops ==
During the Soviet Army period the name was amalgamated with the new mode of motorised manoeuvre capability by the Soviet Red Army to create motor-rifle troops (Russian: мотострелковые войска) as the most numerous of all types of ground forces.
