= Georges Saillard =

French actor (1877–1967)

- Born: Georges Augustin Eugène Saillard; 5 July 1877; Besançon, Doubs, France
- Died: 11 September 1967 (aged 90); Versailles, Yvelines, France
- Burial place: Cimetière des Gonards
- Occupation: actor
- Years active: 1909—1950
- Spouse: Suzanne Nivette

Georges Augustin Eugène Saillard (French pronunciation: [ʒɔʁʒ oɡystɛ̃ øʒɛn sajaʁ]; 5 July 1877 – 11 September 1967) was a French film actor. He starred in some 52 films between 1909 and 1950.

Saillard was married to actress Suzanne Nivette. He died on 11 September 1967 in Versailles, he is buried in Cimetière des Gonards.

== Filmography ==
- Maitre Cornelius (1910)
- L'Honneur (1910)
- Cesar Birotteau (1911)
- L'Auberge Rouge (1912)
- La Voleuse (1912)
- Conscience de l'enfant (1912)
- Au-delà des lois humaines (1920)
- Colette the Unwanted (1927)
- Honeymoon Trip (1933)
- Golgotha (1935)
- Beethoven's Great Love (1937)
- Marthe Richard (1937)
- Yoshiwara (1937)
- The Citadel of Silence (1937)
- J'accuse! (1938)
- Ramuntcho (1938)
- Thérèse Martin (1939)
- The Master Valet (1941)
- Orvert (1955)
