= Georges Dutriac =

French painter

Georges Pierre Dutriac (born 17 November 1866 in Bordeaux – 17 March 1958 in Charenton-le-Pont) was a French painter and illustrator.

== Life ==
Active from 1902 to 1942, Dutriac exhibited at the Salon de la société des artistes français from 1893. Frequently commissioned by Parisian publishers, he illustrated dozens of novels, including those of Jules Verne, Émile Driant, Gaston Chérau, Gyp and Magdeleine du Genestoux, and provided drawings for L'Illustration.

== Sources ==
- Bénézit, Emmanuel (1999). Dictionnaire des peintres, sculpteurs, dessinateurs et graveurs (in French). Vol. 4. Paris: Gründ. p. 957. ISBN 978-2-70003-014-3.
