= Raoul Moretti =

French composer (1893–1954)

- Born: 10 August 1893; Marseille, Bouches-du-Rhône, France
- Died: 6 March 1954 (aged 60); Vence (Alpes-Maritimes)
- Occupation: Composer
- Years active: 1930-1943 (film)

Raoul Moretti (1893–1954) was a French composer of film scores. Specialising in light music, he also wrote operettas.

== Selected filmography ==
- King of the Hotel (1932)
- If You Wish It (1932)
- Simone Is Like That (1933)
- Suburban Melody (1933)
- One Night's Secret (1934)
- The Hortensia Sisters (1935)
- Count Obligado (1935)
- Sing Anyway (1940)
- Vénus aveugle (1941)
- Moulin Rouge (1941)
- Melody for You (1942)
- A Woman in the Night (1943)
- After the Storm (1943)
- A Dog's Life (1943)

== Bibliography ==
- Lamb, Andrew. 150 Years of Popular Musical Theatre. Yale University Press, 2000.
