= Chant des Partisans =

1943 French song by Anna Marly

The "Chant des Partisans" ([ʃɑ̃ de paʁ.ti.zɑ̃]; "Song of the Partisans") was the most popular song of the Free French and French Resistance during World War II.

The piece was written and put to melody in London in 1943 after Anna Marly heard the Russian song "Through Valleys and Over Hills" that provided her with inspiration. Joseph Kessel and Maurice Druon wrote the French lyrics. It was performed by Anna Marly, broadcast by the BBC and adopted by the maquis. The lyrics of the song revolve around the idea of a life-or-death struggle for national liberation. After the war the "Chant des Partisans" was so popular, it was proposed as a new national anthem for France. It became for a short while the unofficial national anthem, next to the official "La Marseillaise".

Anna Marly also wrote and performed a more introspective song, "La Complainte du Partisan", which was later adapted and translated into English as "The Partisan". It was most famously covered by Leonard Cohen. The two songs are sometimes confused.
