= Jean de Marguenat =

French screenwriter and film director

- Born: 2 May 1893; Paris, France
- Died: 16 April 1956 (aged 62); Paris, France
- Other name: Jean Richard André de Marguenat
- Occupations: Director, Writer
- Years active: 1931–1949 (film)

Jean de Marguenat (2 May 1893 – 16 April 1956) was a French screenwriter and film director. He directed nineteen films including the 1937 British musical The Street Singer (1937).

Earlier in his life de Marguenat was an amateur auto racer, attempting a AAA Championship car race at the Atlantic City Speedway in New Jersey in 1926. He failed to qualify.

== Selected filmography ==
- Miche (1932)
- The Red Robe (1933)
- Prince Jean (1934)
- Adémaï in the Middle Ages (1935)
- The Street Singer (1937)
- Happy Days (1941)
- Behold Beatrice (1944)

== Bibliography ==
- De Lafayette, Maximillien. Hollywood Femmes Fatales and Ladies of Film Noir, Volume 1.
