= Gaston Roudès =

French actor, movie director and screenwriter

- Born: 24 March 1878; Béziers, Hérault
- Died: 5 November 1958 (aged 80); Villejuif, Val-de-Marne
- Occupations: Film director, screenwriter
- Years active: 1911–1939

Gaston Roudès (born 24 March 1878, Béziers, Hérault, France; d. 5 November 1958, Villejuif, Val-de-Marne, France) was a French actor, movie director and screenwriter best known for his silent movies of the 1920s and early 1930s. He directed more than 60 movies between 1911 and 1939.

== Selected filmography ==
- House in the Sun (1929)
- Roger la Honte (1933)
- The House of Mystery (1933)
- Little Jacques (1934)
