= Sim Viva =

Belgian soprano singer and actress

- Sim Viva in 1931
- Born: Simone Poncelet; 12 January 1903; Saint-Josse-ten-Noode, Belgium
- Died: 10 August 1982 (aged 79); Paris, France
- Occupations: singer and film actress
- Spouse: Géo Bury

Sim Viva (12 January 1903 – 10 August 1982) was a Belgian soprano singer and actress prominent in operetta and film in the 1920s and 1930s. She made several recordings on the Ultraphone, Pathé, and Odeon labels.

== Life and career ==
Sim Viva was born Simone Poncelet in Saint-Josse-ten-Noode, Belgium. By 1922 she was already appearing in Paris at Le Trianon where she sang in revivals Planquette's Le Paradis de Mahomet and Terrasse's Cartouche. She returned there the following year in Sylvie.

== In operetta ==
Sim Viva's roles in operetta and musical theatre included:

- Trois jeunes filles nues by Raoul Moretti (1925) Théâtre des Bouffes-Parisiens, as Lilette (world premiere)
- J'aime! by Henri Christiné (1926) Théâtre des Bouffes-Parisiens, as Nicole de Malassis de la Panouille (world premiere)
- Mercenary Mary by Con Conrad and William B. Friedlander (1927) Théâtre des Bouffes-Parisiens, as Jenny (premiere of the French adaptation)
- Rosy by Raoul Moretti (1930) Théâtre des Folies-Wagram, as Noisette (world premiere)
- Zou! by Josef Szulc, (1930) Théâtre des Folies-Wagram, as Magali (world premiere)
- Nina-Rosa by Sigmund Romberg, (1931) Théâtre du Châtelet, as Nina Rosa (French premiere)
- Brummell by Reynaldo Hahn (1931) Théâtre des Folies-Wagram, as Peggy (world premiere)
- La Madone du promenoir by Henri Christiné (1933) Concert Mayol, as Sylvette (world premiere)
- Miss Cocktail by Maurice Bertin (1934) Théâtre Fontaine as Janine (world premiere)
- Un p'tit bout d'femme by René Mercier (1936) Gaîté Lyrique, as Adrienne Baudry-Duclin (Paris premiere)
- L' Auberge du chat coiffé by Josef Szulc (1936) Théâtre Pigalle as Toinette (world premiere)

== Filmography ==
Sim Viva's film roles include:

- En bordée (1931) as Mady Lagarouste
- Tire au flanc (1933) as Solange
- Les Époux célibataires (1935) as Cherry
- Folies-Bergère (1935) as Mimi
- Martha, based on Flotow's opera Martha (1936) as Lady Harriett ("Martha")
- Prince d'une nuit (1936) as Simone Dastières
