= Georges Gabriel Thenon =

French chansonnier, draughtsman, librettist and revue creator

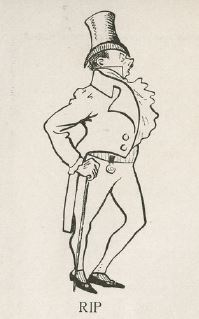
- Self-portrait as a dandy (from the programme to Brummell)
- Born: 28 February 1884; 17th arrondissement of Paris, France
- Died: 25 May 1941 (aged 57); 16th arrondissement of Paris, France
- Occupations: Draughtsman, chansonnier, librettist

Georges Gabriel Thenon, pen name and stage name Rip, (28 February 1884 – 25 May 1941) was a French chansonnier, draughtsman, librettist and revue creator. Rip wrote successful revues some of which were interpreted inter alia by Mistinguett, Raimu, Arletty, Michel Simon.

== Revues and shows ==
- 1906: Bon inventaire… ô gué !, revue with Paul Ardot, Théâtre du Palais-Royal
- 1906: À perte de revue, revue with Paul Ardot, music by Willy Redstone, Théâtre du Palais-Royal
- 1907: Le Trou d'Almanzor, opérette, music by Willy Redstone, Théâtre des Arts
- 1907: Le Cri de Paris, revue, Théâtre des Capucines
- 1908: Aux Bouffes, on pouffe, revue with Wilfred and Paul Fargue, Théâtre des Bouffes Parisiens
- 1908: Le Coq d'Inde, operetta, music by Claude Terrasse, Théâtre des Capucines
- 1909: O gué ! L'An neuf !, revue, Théâtre des Capucines
- 1909: Sans rancune, revue, Théâtre des Capucines
- 1910: Bigre !, revue with Jacques Bousquet, Théâtre des Capucines
- 1910: Sauf vot' respect, revue, music by Jacques Bousquet, Théâtre des Capucines
- 1911: La Revue with Jean Bousquet, music by Paul Letombe, directed by Paul Febvre, L'Olympia
- 1912: La Revue de l'année with Jean Bousquet, music by Paul Letombe, directed by Paul Febvre, L'Olympia
- 1912: Paris fin de règne, revue, Théâtre des Capucines
- 1913: Eh ! Eh !, revue with Jacques Bousquet, Théâtre Fémina
- 1913: Pan ! Dans l'œil !, revue, music by Jacques Bousquet, Théâtre des Capucines
- 1913: Les Petits Crevés, operetta with Jacques Bousquet, music by Willy Redstone, Théâtre des Capucines
- 1914: Très moutarde, revue with Jacques Bousquet, Théâtre Fémina
- 1915: Plus ça change !, revue, Théâtre Michel
- 1917: Où Camp'ton, revue, Théâtre des Capucines
- 1920: Miousic, revue with Régis Gignoux, directed by Pierre Wolff, Théâtre des Capucines
- 1920: Le Scandale de Deauville, comédie with Régis Gignoux, Théâtre des Capucines
- 1921: Si que je s'rai roi revue with Régis Gignoux, Théâtre des Capucines
- 1922: L'homme du soir, comédie de Rip et Louis Leplay, Théâtre des Capucines
- 1929: Au temps de Gastounet, revue, Théâtre des Bouffes-Parisiens
- 1931: Brummell, operetta with Robert Dieudonné, music by Reynaldo Hahn, Folies-Wagram
- 1931: La Viscosa, (piece of news), Théâtre du Palais-Royal
- 1932: Le progrès s'amuse, revue de Rip, directed by Edmond Roze, Théâtre des Capucines
- 1934: La Revue des Variétés revue, directed by Edmond Roze, Théâtre des Variétés
- 1935: La Revue des Nouveautés, revue, Théâtre des Nouveautés
- 1936: Le Guéridon Empire revue, directed by Edmond Roze, Comédie des Champs-Élysées
- 1937: V'la le travail revue, Théâtre des Nouveautés
- 1947: Revue de Rip, directed by Robert Pizani, Théâtre de l'Étoile

== Filmography ==
As actor unless otherwise stated :

- 1926: Au revoir et merci by Pierre Colombier and E. B. Donatien (only as author)
- 1931: Un joli succès, short film by Louis Mercanton
- 1931: Conférence sur la beauté, short film by Louis Mercanton
- 1932: La Dame d'en face by Claude Autant-Lara (short film) (author)
- 1932: Laissez faire le temps (anonyme) (short film) (coscreenwriter and lyricist for the song)
- 1932: Cognasse by Louis Mercanton (actor and author)
- 1933: Theodore and Company by Pierre Colombier
