= Albert Valsien =

French composer

- Valsien in 1931
- Born: Albert Valensi; 24 April 1882; Algiers, French Algeria
- Died: 22 May 1955 (aged 73); Paris, France
- Occupations: composer; conductor

Albert Valsien (24 April 1882 – 22 May 1955) was a French composer and conductor. He was particularly known for his songs, but also composed three operettas. He was a regular conductor of the Orchestre Odéon and at the Théâtre Daunou, Théâtre des Folies-Wagram, and Théâtre des Nouveautés.

== Life and career ==
Valsien was born Albert Valensi in Algiers, the son of a French silk merchant on the Rue de la Lyre. He was educated at the lycée in Ben Aknoun and showed a precocious talent as a composer. His first published song, "Reine de prés" was written when he was 14 and had considerable success. His teacher suggested that he go to France to study at the Conservatoire de Paris, but his mother was opposed to the idea. Instead, at the age of 16 he enrolled in the École supérieure des beaux-arts in Algiers where he won the first prize in harmony the following year. While still a student at the École supérieure several of his songs were performed at the Casino d'Alger.

Valsien eventually went to Paris after completing his military service as a nurse stationed at Bône in the north-eastern corner of Algeria. In Paris he showed his songs to the singer Félix Mayol. It marked the beginning of a partnership which produced some of Mayol's greatest successes including "Cousine", "Arrouah Sidi", "Si l'on s'aime", "Voilà pourquoi", and "Bou-dou-ba-da-bouh!". The latter became a prototype for a genre of popular songs depicting soldiers from France's African colonies and inspired the title of Bon Candidat Boudoubadabout, one of Georges Rouault's etchings in the series Les Réincarnation du Père Ubu.

At the outbreak of World War I, Valsien rejoined the army as a nurse and was stationed at Barlin in northern France. While under bombardment by German artillery, he composed the song "Petit matelot" which Mayol sang in his visits to French military hospitals. Towards the end of the war, he fell ill and was transferred to the auxiliary service in Orléans. There he met Jean Guitton who showed him an operetta libretto he had written, Clo-Clo, and convinced Valsien to set it to music. Clo-Clo (co-composed with Francis Kams) premiered at the Eldorado in 1920 conducted by Valsien himself.

In the later years of his career, Valsien devoted himself primarily to conducting for various Paris theatres including the Théâtre Daunou, Théâtre des Folies-Wagram, and Théâtre des Nouveautés as well as conducting dozens of recordings for Odeon Records. He also appeared as an actor in the role of the orchestra conductor in Henri Jeanson's 1949 film Lady Paname.

Valsien died in Paris at the age of 73.

== Operettas ==
- Clo-Clo (co-composed with Francis Kams), premiered at the Eldorado, Paris, 10 September 1920
- J'te veux (co-composed with Gaston Gabaroche, René Mercier, and Fred Pearly), premiered at the Théâtre Marigny, Paris, 14 February 1923
- Le Béguin de la Reine, premiered at the Alhambra, Caen, 14 September 1923
