= Brummell (opera) =

1931 operetta

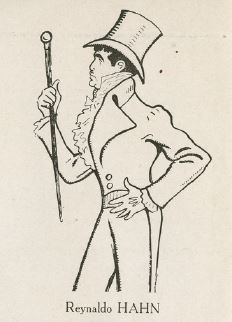
Rip's caricature of composer Reynaldo Hahn as Beau Brummell

Brummell is a 1931 operetta in three acts and five scenes by Reynaldo Hahn to a libretto by Rip and Robert Dieudonné. Its protagonist is the English dandy Beau Brummell (1778-1840), although the storyline is entirely fictional.

== Roles ==
Role	Voice type	Premiere cast, 17 January 1931 Théâtre des Folies-Wagram (Conductor: Albert Valsien)
Beau Brummell		Robert Pizani
Jim		Lucien Baroux
Dick Fryatt		Louis Arnault
The Prince of Wales		Henry Jullien
Lady Eversharp		Marguerite Deval
Peggy		Sim Viva
Laura		Renée Devilder

== Synopsis ==
Act I
Scene 1 "The dandies"; Scene 2 "The king of fashion"

Beau Brummel meets with Jim, who is taking part in a boxing match. Brummell shares Jim's lowly origins; they were friends as children when Brummell's aunt was a dairy-woman near Hyde Park, and when Brummell himself was in love with the washerwoman's daughter Peggy. Peggy has since become Brummell's laundress, without the latter being aware of her identity; however Jim recognizes her and Brummell is moved at the re-introduction. As Brummell has lost a lot of money at the Derby, Peggy suggests he retreats to the Surrey countryside.

Act II
Scene 1 "At Lady Eversharp's"; Scene 2 "To the country!"

Lady Eversharp wonders where Brummel can have got to. By chance, a group of dandies are on a fox hunt at the village where Brummell is hiding, initially mistaking a scarecrow on which Brummell's cast-off fineries have been clad for the man himself. Jim tells them that Brummell is living there in retirement, and as Brummell's word in fashion is law, the dandies reappear dressed as peasants. although they still do not recognize Brummell in his disguise.

Act III

The dandies are now dressed as Trianon-style shepherds. The Prince of Wales rebukes Brummell for having deserted high society in favour of a laundress who will not even consent to be his mistress. Brummell wagers that he can conquer her by mid-day. He loses: but when he is about to confess, Peggy offers to say that she has become his lover, to save his reputation. Touched, Brummell declines and gives his blessing for her to marry her true love.

== Recordings and broadcast ==
A number of 78 rpm recordings were made in 1931 of numbers from the opera, sung by those who premiered them. Some of these recordings were conducted by the composer. Complete performances were broadcast on French radio in 1946 (when the cast included Gérard Souzay), in 1950 and 1952, and in 1962 with Aime Doniat, Albert Voli, Gaston Rey, and the Orchestre Radio-Symphonique de Lille, conducted by Marcel Cariven.

== Gallery ==
Cartoons of the librettists as dandies by Rip, from the original programme of Brummell

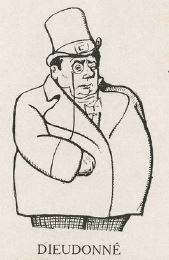
Robert Dieudonné

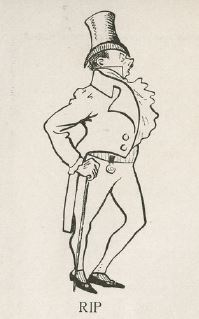
Rip (self-portrait)
