= Pétrus (film) =

1946 film by Marc Allegret

- Directed by: Marc Allegret
- Written by: Marc Allegret; Marcel Achard; Marcel Rivet
- Based on: Pétrus by Marcel Achard
- Produced by: Georges Florin; René Guggenheim; Maurice Réfrégier
- Starring: Fernandel; Simone Simon; Marcel Dalio
- Cinematography: Michel Kelber
- Edited by: Henri Taverna
- Music by: Joseph Kosma
- Production company: Les Films Impéria
- Distributed by: Les Films Impéria
- Release date: 2 October 1946
- Running time: 90 minutes
- Country: France
- Language: French

Petrus is a 1946 French comedy mystery crime film directed by Marc Allegret and starring Fernandel, Simone Simon, Marcel Dalio and Pierre Brasseur. Future star Corinne Calvet appears in a supporting role. It was shot at the Cité Elgé Studios in Paris and on location around the city. The film's sets were designed by the art director Max Douy. The film had admissions in France of 2,602,669.

== Cast ==
- Fernandel as Pétrus
- Simone Simon as Anne Loiseleur dite Migo
- Marcel Dalio as Luciani
- Pierre Brasseur as Rodrigue Goutari
- Simone Sylvestre as Francine
- Corinne Calvet as Liliane Evans
- Liliane Robin as Rolande
- Dominique Brévant as Annette - Vendeuse de fleurs
- Jean Fleur as Jean - Garagiste
- Émile Riandreys as Macreuse - Agent de police
- Jean-Roger Caussimon as Milou - Graveur
- Georges Pally as Commissaire
- Marguerite Guillaumin as Chorégraphe du Frou-Frou
- Georges Dimeray as Bijoutier
- Jane Marken as Mme Portal - Charcutière
- Abel Jacquin as Inspecteur Renault
- Roger Vadim as Garçon
- Nicolas Vogel as ournaliste
- Solange Podell as Christiane
- Gabrielle Fontan as Mme Brisson

== Bibliography ==
- Rège, Philippe. Encyclopedia of French Film Directors, Volume 1. Scarecrow Press, 2009.
