= The Two Girls (1936 film) =

1936 film

- Directed by: Maurice Champreux; René Hervil
- Written by: Jean-Louis Bouquet; Henry Dupuis-Mazuel; Louis Feuillade (novel); René Hervil
- Produced by: Aimé Frapin
- Starring: Abel Tarride; Jacqueline Daix; Alice Tissot
- Cinematography: Georges Asselin
- Edited by: Maurice Champreux
- Music by: Maurice Yvain
- Production company: Films Artistiques Français
- Release date: 10 April 1936
- Running time: 95 minutes
- Country: France
- Language: French

The Two Girls (French: Les deux gamines) is a 1936 French drama film directed by Maurice Champreux and René Hervil and starring Abel Tarride, Jacqueline Daix and Alice Tissot. It was based on a novel which was also turned into a 1921 silent film and a 1951 sound film.

The film's sets were designed by the art director Claude Bouxin.

== Main cast ==
- Abel Tarride as Monsieur Bertal
- Jacqueline Daix as Ginette
- Maurice Escande as Pierre Manin
- Alice Tissot as Mademoiselle Bénazer
- Claude Barghon as Gaby
- Fanely Revoil as Lisette Fleury
- Madeleine Guitty as La mère Michaut
- Bernard Lancret as Bersange
- Max Maxudian as Le père Bénazer
- René Bergeron as La Tringle
- Sinoël as Chambertin

== Bibliography ==
- James L. Limbacher. Haven't I seen you somewhere before?: Remakes, sequels, and series in motion pictures and television, 1896-1978. Pierian Press, 1979.
