= The Drunkard (1937 film) =

1937 film

- Directed by: Jean-Louis Bouquet; Jean Kemm
- Written by: Jean-Louis Bouquet; Henry Dupuis-Mazuel
- Based on: The Drunkard by Jules Mary
- Starring: Germaine Rouer; Jean Debucourt; Jacqueline Daix
- Cinematography: Georges Asselin
- Music by: Faustin Jeanjean; Maurice Yvain
- Production company: Les Films Artistiques Français
- Distributed by: Ciné Sélection
- Release date: 19 February 1937
- Running time: 87 minutes
- Country: France
- Language: French

The Drunkard (French: La pocharde) is a 1937 French drama film directed by Jean-Louis Bouquet and Jean Kemm and starring Germaine Rouer, Jean Debucourt and Jacqueline Daix. The film's sets were designed by the art director Claude Bouxin. It is based on the 1898 novel of the same title by Jules Mary which was remade in 1953.

== Cast ==
- Germaine Rouer as Charlotte Lamarche
- Jean Debucourt as Le docteur Marignan
- Jacqueline Daix as Claire Lamarche
- Jacqueline Dumonceau as Louise Lamarche
- Bernard Lancret as Gauthier Marignan
- Henri Bosc as Berthelin
- Robert Pizani as Moëb
- Fred Poulin as L'avocat général
- Marcelle Samson as Mademoiselle Poupette
- Tarquini d'Or
- Marie-Louise Derval
- Paul Escoffier
- Ginette Leclerc
- Jean Liézer
- Michèle Ott
- Georges Paulais
- Lina Roxa

== Bibliography ==
- Goble, Alan. The Complete Index to Literary Sources in Film. Walter de Gruyter, 1999.
