= The Yellow Dog (novel) =

1931 detective novel by Georges Simenon

- First edition
- Author: Georges Simenon
- Original title: French: Le Chien jaune
- Language: French
- Series: Inspector Jules Maigret
- Genre: Detective fiction
- Publisher: Fayard
- Publication date: 1931
- Publication place: France
- English publication date: 1939
- Media type: Print
- Preceded by: The Carter of 'La Providence'
- Followed by: Night at the Crossroads

The Yellow Dog (French: Le Chien jaune) is a detective novel by the Belgian writer Georges Simenon. The novel features Simenon's character Detective Chief Inspector Maigret and involves his investigation into a series of shootings and poisonings in the coastal town of Concarneau. The novel was first published in French in 1931, and has been translated into English twice and adapted for film and television three times.

== Plot ==
Corceneau is located in the department of Finistère, itself in westernmost Brittany

Detective Chief Inspector Maigret is reorganising the Rennes mobile unit when he is called to Concarneau to investigate the shooting of Monsieur Mostaguen, a wine merchant. Mostaguen had been playing cards at the Admiral Hotel with Yves Le Pommeret (Vice Consul for Denmark), Jean Servières (a journalist) and Dr Michoux (a property developer). Soon after leaving, he was shot and seriously wounded from the door of a vacant house near the hotel. A large yellow dog that no one recognised was at the scene of the crime.

Maigret, Le Pommeret, Servières and Michoux are about to have drinks at the hotel when Michoux notices that the drinks have been poisoned. Michoux spends the night there, saying he is ill and his mother is out of town. Maigret questions Emma, the waitress, who admits that she is Michoux's lover but denies poisoning the drinks.

Maigret and detective Leroy investigate Michoux's home and find the footprints of a large man and a dog. Servières is reported missing and his abandoned car is found with blood stains on its seats. The Brest Beacon publishes an alarmist article reporting the events. Reporters from all over France descend on the hotel.

A shoemaker shoots and wounds the yellow dog, and Maigret takes it to the hotel. There he learns that Le Pommeret has been fatally poisoned in his home. After investigating the crime scene, Maigret returns to find the dog missing.

The police arrest a huge vagrant, who escapes. The mayor demands that Maigret make an arrest, so Maigret arrests Michoux and sends him to a cell in the police barracks for his own protection. That night, Maigret and Leroy see Emma and the vagrant meet in the vacant house. A customs guard is shot in the calf by the quay while Maigret has Emma and the vagrant under observation. Emma and the man leave the house and Maigret sends Leroy to follow them, but the couple evade him. Maigret receives a telegram announcing the arrest of Servières in Paris.

Madame Michoux returns to Concarneau. Maigret searches Emma's hotel room and finds an old letter from "Léon" stating he has bought a boat and when he makes enough money from shipping cargo he and Emma can get married. Maigret searches Michoux's room and finds evidence that Emma had arranged a meeting with someone in the vacant house at the time Mostaguen was shot.

Maigret arranges for Servières, Madame Michoux and the mayor to meet him at the police barracks, and for Emma and Léon to be brought there when they are found. When they are all assembled, the mayor reveals that Léon had been jailed in the United States for smuggling cocaine. Léon explains that Michoux, Le Pommeret, Servières and an American arranged the cocaine shipment, but when the four discovered that the American authorities had tightened border controls, they betrayed Léon for a reward. On his release from prison, Léon returned to Concarneau to seek revenge. He stalked Michoux, hoping to terrify him into a rash act for which Michoux would be jailed. The dog, now dead, was Léon's.

Maigret explains that Michoux tricked Emma into arranging a meeting with Léon in the vacant house. Michoux then hid there intending to shoot Léon when he arrived, but he shot Mostaguen by mistake. Maigret says he poisoned the drinks at the hotel himself to see how the others reacted, intending to warn them before they drank them. Servières faked his own death and wrote the newspaper article calculated to cause panic in the hope that a vigilante would shoot Léon. Michoux poisoned Le Pommeret, suspecting he was about to go to the police. Madame Michoux shot the customs officer in the leg to divert suspicion from her son.

After charging Michoux and his mother with their crimes, Maigret recommends that Léon and Emma should go free. While Maigret, Léon and Emma are being driven to the train station, Emma admits she put the poison in the drinks at the hotel and asks Maigret why he said it was him. He says the idea just came to him. He gives them 200 francs to help them start their new life together.

== Publishing history ==
The novel originally appeared in French in 1931 as Le Chien jaune, published in Paris by Fayard. The first English translation, translated by Geoffrey Sainsbury, was published by George Routledge & Sons in 1939 as A Face for a Clue. It was reissued (by Severn House) as Maigret and the Concarneau Murders in 1980. The novel appeared as Maigret and the Yellow Dog in a new translation by Linda Asher, published by Harcourt Brace Jovanovich in 1987, and as The Yellow Dog in London in 2003 (Penguin Books). Penguin published a minor revision of the Linda Asher translation as a Penguin Modern Classic in 2013.

== Adaptations ==
The book was first filmed in 1932 in France as Le Chien Jaune. It was directed by Jean Tarride whose father Abel Tarride played Maigret.

A French TV adaptation aired on 24 February 1968 as part of the series Les enquêtes du commissaire Maigret. Jean Richard played the lead role. The same series adapted the book a second time on 13 March 1988, with Jean Richard repeating his part.

== Bibliography ==
- Simenon, Georges (2013). The Yellow Dog. Translated by Asher, Linda. London: Penguin Classics. ISBN 9780141393476.
- Young, Trudee (1976). Georges Simenon, a checklist of his 'Maigret' and other mystery novels and short stories in French and in English translations. Metuchen, N.J.: The Scarecrow Press. ISBN 0-8108-0964-8.
