= The Drunkard (1953 film) =

1953 film

- Directed by: Georges Combret
- Written by: Claude Boissol; Louis d'Yvré
- Based on: The Drunkard by Jules Mary
- Produced by: Georges Combret
- Starring: Pierre Brasseur; Monique Mélinand; François Patrice
- Cinematography: Pierre Petit
- Edited by: Germaine Fouquet
- Music by: Hubert Giraud
- Production company: Radius Productions
- Distributed by: Warner Brothers (France)
- Release date: 15 May 1953
- Running time: 92 minutes
- Country: France
- Language: French

The Drunkard (French: La pocharde) is a 1953 French drama film directed by Georges Combret and starring Pierre Brasseur, Monique Mélinand and François Patrice. It was shot at the Billancourt Studios in Paris. The film's sets were designed by the art director Marcel Magniez. It is based on the 1898 novel of the same title by Jules Mary which had previously been made into a 1921 silent film The Drunkard and a 1937 sound film The Drunkard.

== Cast ==
- Pierre Brasseur as Maître Pierre Renneville
- Monique Mélinand as Denise Lamarche
- François Patrice as Jacques
- Sophie Leclair as Gisèle
- Henri Nassiet as Le docteur Marignan
- Alfred Adam as Georges Lamarche
- Albert Duvaleix as Le président
- Odette Laure as Madame Berthelin
- Jacqueline Porel as Lucienne Marignan
- Marie-France as Nicole
- Lucienne Le Marchand as Madame Lamarche mère
- Pauline Carton as Mademoiselle Michel - La Punaise
- Alice Tissot as Madame Pitois - La Pimbêche
- André Gabriello as Berthelin
- Marcelle Arnold as Madame Fournier
- Charles Bouillaud as Le substitut Barillier
- Henri Coutet as Un homme
- Paul Demange as Un habitué
- Cécile Didier as Hortense
- Michel Etcheverry as L'avocat général
- Jean Lanier as Le professeur
- Roger Vincent as Le médecin légiste

== Bibliography ==
- Philippe Rège. Encyclopedia of French Film Directors, Volume 1. Scarecrow Press, 2009.
