= Jacques Henley =

French actor

Jacques Henley (born Jacques Dhote) was a French actor.

== Selected filmography ==
- Our Masters, the Servants (1930)
- The Mystery of the Villa Rose (1930)
- The Threepenny Opera (1931)
- The Yellow Dog (1932)
- The Regiment's Champion (1932)
- Colomba (1933)
- Koenigsmark (1935)
- Parisian Life (1936)
- The Mutiny of the Elsinore (1936)
- Street of Shadows (1937)
- Marthe Richard (1937)
- Ultimatum (1938)
- Return at Dawn (1938)
- Serge Panine (1939)
- The Five Cents of Lavarede (1939)
- Entente cordiale (1939)
- Place de la Concorde (1939)
- Monsieur Hector (1940)
- Threats (1940)
- Return to Happiness (1942)
- Jericho (1946)
- Captain Blomet (1947)
- False Identity (1947)
- Judicial Error (1948)
- Colomba (1948)
- City of Hope (1948)
- The Renegade (1948)
- The Red Angel (1949)
- Death Threat (1950)
