= Robert Dieudonné =

French playwright and journalist

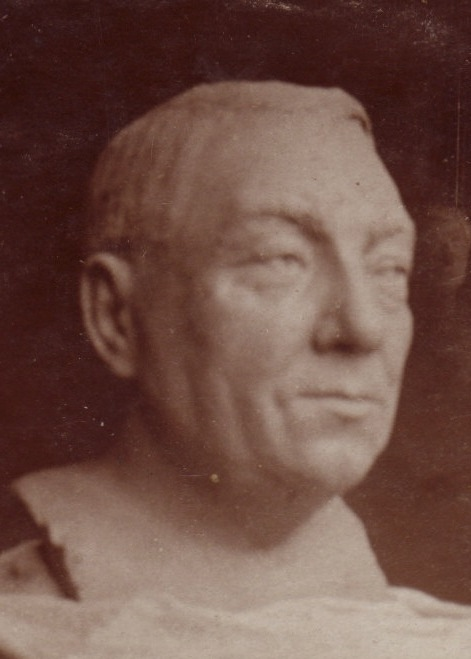
- Robert Dieudonné 1936
- Born: Robert Marie Félix Edmond Dieudonné; 23 June 1879; Paris
- Died: 30 September 1940 (aged 61); Paris
- Occupations: Playwright, journalist

Signature
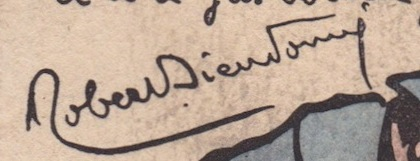

Robert Dieudonné (23 June 1879 – 30 September 1940) was a French playwright and journalist of the first half of the 20th century.

== Works ==
He authored letters, lyrics, libretti and caricatures

- July 1904: he created the characters of countess Riguidi and her daughter Emma in the newspaper L'Œuvre by Gustave Téry, a column that he continued in Le Canard enchaîné.
- 1918: Le cochon qui sommeille ou le coq d'Inde, operetta by Rip, (revision) by Robert Dieudonné, music by Claude Terrasse, directed by Georgé, Concert Mayol.
- January 1920: Gigoletto, operetta in 2 acts, libretto by Rip and Robert Dieudonné, music by Albert Chantrier, La Cigale.
- May 1923: Les Linottes operetta in 3 acts after Georges Courteline adapted by Robert Dieudonné and Carpentier, Théâtre des Nouveautés.
- September 1924: La Guitare et le jazz-band by Henri Duvernois and Robert Dieudonné, Théâtre des Nouveautés, 22 September.
- January 1931: Brummell operetta in 3 acts, libretto by Rip and Robert Dieudonné, music by Reynaldo Hahn, Folies-Wagram.
- He took part in more than 70 plays.
- 1940: Until 1940, he was responsible for the fashion column in Le Canard enchaîné.

== Honours ==
- Officer of the Legion of Honour

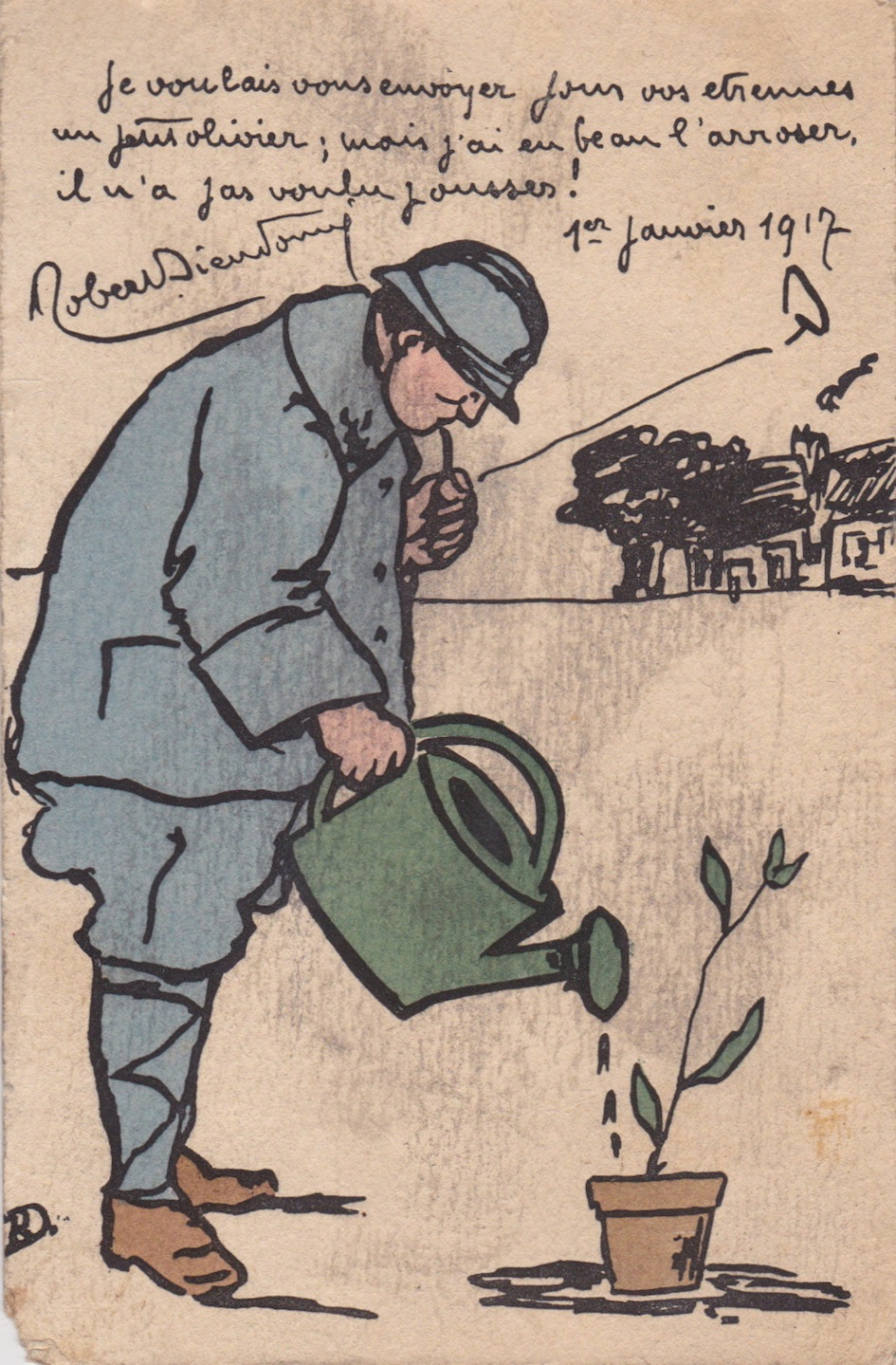
Greeting card 1917, by Robert Dieudonné.
