= Tobias Is an Angel =

1940 film

- Directed by: Yves Allégret
- Cinematography: Henri Alekan
- Release date: 1940
- Running time: 71 minutes
- Country: France
- Language: French

Tobias Is an Angel (French: Tobie est un ange) is a 1940 French comedy film directed by Yves Allégret. The title is a reference to Tobias and the Angel. The film was made at Toulon, then in Vichy France. It is now considered a lost film.

== Synopsis ==
Tobias is a put-upon fairground worker is constantly belittled by his manager. In despair he goes to the fortune teller who predicts an inheritance for him. After this his confidence improves and he is offered a promotion by the owner of the fair.

== Cast ==
- Pierre Brasseur
- Janine Darcey
- Pauline Carton
- Rellys
- Lucienne Le Marchand
- Gisèle Alcée
- Nicolas Amato
- Edmond Castel
- Yves Deniaud
- Marcel Duhamel
- Jim Gerald
- Henri Guisol
- Raymond Marcel
- Milly Mathis
- Gaston Orbal
- André Pierrel
- Georges Térof
- Lydie Vallois
- Georges Vallée

== Bibliography ==
- Waldman, Harry. Scenes Unseen: Unreleased and Uncompleted Films from the World's Master Filmmakers, 1912-1990. McFarland, 1991.
