= The Flame (1936 film) =

1936 film by André Berthomieu

- Directed by: André Berthomieu
- Written by: Pierre Maudru; Charles Méré (play)
- Starring: Line Noro; Charles Vanel; Gabriel Signoret
- Cinematography: Jean Isnard; Jacques Montéran
- Edited by: Marthe Poncin
- Music by: Henri Verdun
- Production company: Société Nouvelle de Cinématographie
- Release date: 8 May 1936
- Country: France
- Language: French

The Flame (French: La flamme) is a 1936 French drama film directed by André Berthomieu and starring Line Noro, Charles Vanel and Gabriel Signoret. It is based on a play by Charles Méré. The story had previously been made into a silent film in 1926.

== Cast ==
- Line Noro as Cléo d'Aubigny
- Charles Vanel as Victor Boussat
- Gabriel Signoret as Lord Sidley
- Josette Day as Hélène de Luyze
- Bernard Lancret as Edward Sidley
- Raymond Cordy as Le gaffeur
- Colette Darfeuil as Fanny
- Mady Berry as Mme Laure
- Henri Crémieux as Le détective
- Paul Demange as Le garçon
- Blanche Denège as Mme de Luyze
- Jean Diéner as H. de Luyze
- Toto Grassin as Le barman
- Claire Gérard as La nourrice
- Jean Marconi as Le gigolo
- Alain Michel as Edward enfant

== Bibliography ==
- Goble, Alan. The Complete Index to Literary Sources in Film. Walter de Gruyter, 1999.
