= The Tragic Dolmen =

1948 film

- Directed by: Léon Mathot
- Written by: Léopold Gomez
- Produced by: Léopold Gomez
- Starring: André Alerme; Germaine Rouer; Paulette Dubost
- Cinematography: Charles Bauer
- Edited by: Marguerite Beaugé
- Music by: Henri Verdun
- Production company: Société Africaine Cinématographique
- Distributed by: DisCina
- Release date: 21 July 1948
- Running time: 100 minutes
- Country: France
- Language: French

The Tragic Dolmen (French: Le dolmen tragique) is a 1948 French mystery drama film directed by Léon Mathot and starring André Alerme, Germaine Rouer and Paulette Dubost. It was shot at the Victorine Studios in Nice with location shooting taking place around the nearby town of Villeneuve-Loubet. The film's sets were designed by the art director Claude Bouxin.

== Synopsis ==
Following the murder of one of the guests at the country home of the Vicomte de Kerlec, Inspector Pauc is sent to investigate. He mingles with the aristocrat's guests who include a naval attaché and the sinister Bartoli, a spy seeking secret documents. Pauc eventually reveals the identity of the killer following a séance.

== Cast ==
- André Alerme as Le vicomte de Kerlec
- Germaine Rouer as Madame Mauclerc
- Paulette Dubost as La vicomtesse de Kerlec
- Roland Armontel as Inspecteur Pauc
- Pierre Clarel as Antoine
- Philippe Hersent as Bartoli
- André Chanu as Pascalin
- Lucien Callamand as Un inspecteur
- Annie Rouvre as Yvonne
- Marthe Mussine as Annik
- Pierre Cressoy as Jacques Mauclerc
- Michèle Philippe as Madame Pascalin
- Robert Pizani as Châtelard

== Bibliography ==
- Rège, Philippe. Encyclopedia of French Film Directors, Volume 1. Scarecrow Press, 2009.
