= Bourrasque =

1935 film by Pierre Billon

- Directed by: Pierre Billon
- Written by: Léopold Gomez
- Produced by: Léopold Gomez
- Starring: Germaine Rouer; Jacques Grétillat; Jean Servais
- Cinematography: Armand Thirard
- Edited by: Georges Friedland
- Music by: Michel Ubono
- Production company: Societé de Production Algérienne Cinématographique
- Distributed by: Védis
- Release date: 28 June 1935
- Running time: 80 minutes
- Country: France
- Language: French

Bourrasque is a 1935 French drama film directed by Pierre Billon and starring Germaine Rouer, Jacques Grétillat and Jean Servais. The film's sets were designed by the art director Roland Quignon.

== Synopsis ==
French Algerian Pierre Bardet refuses to allow permission for his son Marcel to marry an Arab woman. However Pierre's wife reveals that Marcel is not really his son and that his father is a Qaid.

== Cast ==
- Germaine Rouer as Jane Bardet
- Jacques Grétillat as Le caïd Belkacem
- Jean Servais as Marcel Bardet
- Charles Lamy as Cazalbou
- Max Maxudian asLe commandant Moktar
- Pierre Alcover as Pierre Bardet
- Francia Gaufray as Valérie Cazalbou
- Nicole Vattier as Ayada ben Moktar

== Bibliography ==
- Oscherwitz, Dayna & Higgins, MaryEllen. The A to Z of French Cinema. Scarecrow Press, 2009.
- Vincendeau, Ginette. Stars and Stardom in French Cinema. Bloomsbury Publishing, 2000.
