= Martha (1936 film) =

1936 film directed by Karl Anton

- Directed by: Karl Anton
- Written by: Arthur Pohl; Harald Röbbeling
- Produced by: Ludwig Behrends; Frank Clifford
- Starring: Hanna Ralph; Georg Alexander; Fritz Kampers
- Cinematography: Herbert Körner
- Edited by: Marianne Behr
- Music by: Clemens Schmalstich; Friedrich von Flotow (opera)
- Production company: Lloyd Film
- Distributed by: Europa-Filmverleih
- Release date: 3 March 1936
- Running time: 101 minutes
- Country: Germany
- Language: German

Martha is a 1936 German historical musical film directed by Karl Anton and starring Hanna Ralph, Georg Alexander and Fritz Kampers. It is based on the opera of the same title composed by Friedrich von Flotow. It was shot at the Johannisthal Studios in Berlin. The film's sets were designed by the art directors Fritz Maurischat and Karl Weber. It is also known by the alternative title Last Rose (German: Letzte Rose). A separate French-language version under the same title was also produced in Berlin with the same production crew but a different cast and Jacques Bousquet providing the screenplay. It was released on 17 January 1936.

== Cast ==
=== German ===
- Hanna Ralph as Königin von England
- Georg Alexander as Lord Tristan
- Helge Roswaenge as Lyonel
- Fritz Kampers as Plumkett
- Eduard von Winterstein as Sir Durham
- Carla Spletter as Harriet
- Grethe Weiser as Nancy
- Antonie Jaeckel as Haushofmeisterin
- Lena Haustein as Kitty - eine Magd
- Paul Rehkopf as Der Richter

== Critical reception ==
Lionel Collier, writing for the British magazine Picturegoer, described the film as "a charming little romance with due regard to the musical setting and picturesque composition." He found the English subtitles to be "irritating" and believed that the story could be well followed even "by those who do not understand German." He summarised his comments with the assessment that it "is very worth while entertainment …. The story is very well developed and is exceedingly picturesque throughout. It may not be wholly convincing as a picture of England of the period, but it serves as a colourful background for the romance."

=== French ===
- Roger Bourdin as Lionel - le frère de lait de Plunkett
- Courteille as Le juge
- Jacques de Féraudy as Sir Tristan Mickleford - le cousin de Lady Harriet
- Arthur Devère as Le fermier Plunkett
- Huguette Duflos as La reine Anne
- Nina Myral as La duchesse
- Jean Périer as Lord Durham
- Fernande Saala as Nancy - la servante de Lady Harriet
- Madeleine Suffel as Kitty
- Sim Viva as Lady Harriet Durham - la demoiselle d'honneur de la reine Anne

== Bibliography ==
- Klaus, Ulrich J. Deutsche Tonfilme: Jahrgang 1936. Klaus-Archiv, 1988.
