= Liebelei (play) =

1894 play by Arthur Schnitzler

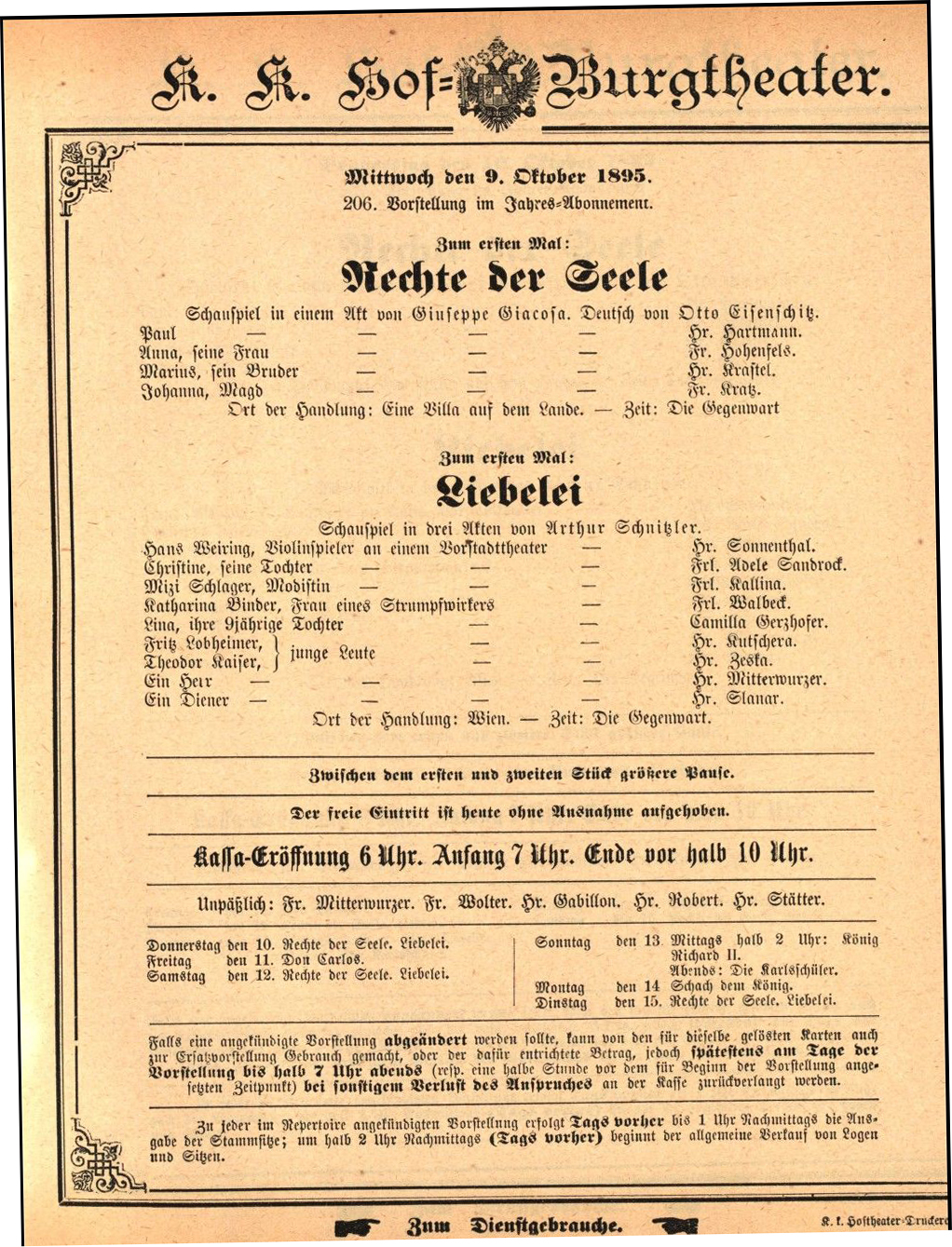
- Theater bill for the play's premiere on 9 October 1895
- Written by: Arthur Schnitzler
- Original language: German
- Setting: Vienna, Present day (1894)

Premiere
- Date premiered: 9 October 1895
- Place premiered: Burgtheater, Vienna

Liebelei (German: [ˌliːbəˈlaɪ̯], lit. 'Affair') is an 1894 play by Austrian dramatist Arthur Schnitzler. It was first performed on 9 October 1895 in the Vienna Burgtheater.

== Characters ==
- Hans Weiring, violin player at the Theater in der Josefstadt
- Christine, his daughter
- Mizi Schlager, Modiste
- Katharina Binder, the wife of a stocking-maker
- Lina, her nine-year-old daughter
- Young people:
  - Fritz Lobheimer
  - Theodor Kaiser
- A man

== Plot ==
=== Act 1 ===
Setting: Fritz' apartment.

Theodor, a young man pursuing his doctorate, has invited two young women (Mizi and Christine) to the apartment of his friend Fritz. He is hoping to distract Fritz from his affair with a married woman by means of the "sweet girl" ("Süßes Mädel" in German) of Christine. There is a playful atmosphere to the engagement, yet while Mizi does not take her relationship with Theodor seriously, Christine is seemingly in love with Fritz. Whilst the four are eating dinner, the husband of the woman with which Fritz is having an affair turns up at the apartment with evidence of the affair in the form of letters which Fritz has written. The man challenges Fritz to a duel. After the man leaves, Fritz tells Theodor of what has happened, clearly distressed. Theodor attempts to comfort him, saying that duels almost always come to a good conclusion. Theodor and the two women then leave Fritz' apartment.

=== Act 2 ===
Setting: Christine's room.

Christine is getting herself ready to go out when her neighbour Katharina Binder enters. She invites Christine to go with her to a beer garden with music. A young man from Binder's family, who is very interested in Christine, will also be there. Christine refuses and leaves the apartment. Shortly afterwards, her father, Weiring, a violin player at the Theater in der Josefstadt, returns from a rehearsal. Weiring and Katharina stay and talk about Christine's beliefs and the lives of young women in general. Katharina thinks that Christine should not associate with Mizi and that it would be good for her to marry the aforementioned relative of Binder. On the other hand, Weiring thinks that young women should enjoy their youth. Mizi enters, and Christine returns. Katharina and Weiring leave the apartment. Christine tells them that Fritz, who was supposed to meet up with her, never came to their meeting place. Eventually Fritz comes to the apartment. Christine is very happy and so is he, having seemingly overcome his feelings for the married woman with whom he was having an affair. After Theodor arrives, the two say goodbye and claim to be going away for a few days - ostensibly to Fritz' family estate, but in reality because of the duel.

=== Act 3 ===
Setting: Christine's room, a few days later.

Christine suffers greatly from Fritz' absence. After she confesses her love for Fritz to her father, she learns from Theodor, Mizi and her father that Fritz died in the duel. She is grief-stricken, knowing that he died for another woman, and runs out of the flat in the hurry. Whether she kills herself at the end of the play or not is left open.

== Development ==
In 1881, at the age of 19, Schnitzler first noted in his diary down the idea for a drama that later developed into Liebelei. A first sketch for the plot was written about 10 years later in 1891; at that time Schnitzler planned to present the play as a "folk play" under the title "That poor girl" ("Das arme Mädel" in German). In the autumn of 1893, Schnitzler wrote the first act of the planned play: it was set in a suburban dance school. In the planned play, the meeting of Fritz and Christine, which is not explicit in the final edition, is shown. After criticism from friends Richard Beer-Hofmann, Hugo von Hofmannsthal, Felix Salten and Gustav Schwarzkopf, Schnitzler discarded this act and tried to re-write it 3 times in the following months. On his fifth attempt starting on 13 September 1894, Schnitzler finally sketched out the final three-act form of the play, and it was complete by mid-October.

== Premiere ==
At the end of October 1894, shortly after its completion, Schnitzler submitted Liebelei to the Burgtheater, and it was accepted for performance the following January. The premiere took place less than a year after the play's completion on 9 October 1895, with Schnitzler's lover Adele Sandrock playing Christine.

== Adaptations ==
=== Film ===
- 1913: Danish silent film Liebelei
- 1933: German film Liebelei
- 1933: French film A Love Story
- 1954: BBC full-length television play, Liebelei, directed by Rudolph Cartier, with Peter Wyngarde as Fritz Lobheimer and Jeanette Sterke as Christine.
- 1958: French film Christine
