= The Corsican Brothers (1939 film) =

1939 film

- Directed by: Géo Kelber; Robert Siodmak
- Written by: Alexandre Arnoux; Gilles Dartevelle; Léo Lania
- Based on: The Corsican Brothers by Alexandre Dumas
- Produced by: Michel Rubinstein; Michel Zelitch
- Starring: Jean Aquistapace; Pierre Brasseur; Lucienne Le Marchand
- Cinematography: Marcel Grignon; Georges C. Stilly
- Music by: Henri Tomasi
- Production company: Distribution Européenne
- Distributed by: Distribution Européenne
- Release date: 3 May 1939
- Running time: 81 minutes
- Country: France
- Language: French

The Corsican Brothers (French: Frères corses) is a 1939 French drama film directed by Géo Kelber and Robert Siodmak and starring Jean Aquistapace, Pierre Brasseur and Lucienne Le Marchand. It is loosely inspired by the novella of the same title by Alexandre Dumas. Siodmak supervised the production and shot much of the location work in Corsica.

== Synopsis ==
The attractive Parisian Gina marries an older Corsican forester, causing turmoil to his twin sons who are both on the receiving end of her advances.

== Cast ==
- Jean Aquistapace as Bruno Ferrazi
- Pierre Brasseur as Tonio
- Paul Azaïs as André, le mauvais garçon
- Lucienne Le Marchand as Gina
- Ruth Pally as Maria
- Jean Brochard as Le gendarme
- Bruno Clair as Lorenzo
- Jacqueline Daix as Laeticia
- Jacques Erwin as Angelo
- Lucien Gallas as Jérôme, le contrebandier
- Zaïa Jollson as Nina
- Raymond Rognoni as Le curé

== Bibliography ==
- Bessy, Maurice & Chirat, Raymond. Histoire du cinéma français: encyclopédie des films, Volume 2. Pygmalion, 1986.
- Crisp, Colin. Genre, Myth and Convention in the French Cinema, 1929-1939. Indiana University Press, 2002.
- Greco, Joseph. The File on Robert Siodmak in Hollywood, 1941-1951. Universal-Publishers, 1999.
- Rège, Philippe. Encyclopedia of French Film Directors, Volume 1. Scarecrow Press, 2009.
