= Serenade (1940 film) =

1940 film

- Directed by: Jean Boyer
- Written by: Ernst Neubach; Pierre Wolff; Jacques Companéez; Max Maret
- Produced by: Robert Tarcali
- Starring: Lilian Harvey; Louis Jouvet; Bernard Lancret; Félix Oudart
- Cinematography: Boris Kaufman; Maurice Pecqueux; Claude Renoir
- Edited by: Louisette Hautecoeur; Marc Sorkin
- Music by: Paul Abraham
- Production company: Tarcali-Films
- Distributed by: Astra Paris Films
- Release date: 28 February 1940
- Running time: 90 minutes
- Country: France
- Language: French

Serenade or Schubert's Serenade (French: Sérénade) is a 1940 French historical film directed by Jean Boyer and starring Lilian Harvey, Louis Jouvet and Bernard Lancret. It portrays a fictional romance between the Austrian composer Franz Schubert and an English dancer. The film was the first of two the Anglo-German actress Lillian Harvey made in France, after leaving Nazi Germany.

== Plot summary ==
Somewhat freewheeling romantic story of a British dancer in love with Schubert, who is jealous of the rival composer Beethoven, but is inspired by his love to write several of his greatest works.

== Cast ==
- Lilian Harvey as Margaret Brenton
- Louis Jouvet as Baron Hartmann
- Bernard Lancret as Franz Schubert
- Félix Oudart as Schwindt the director
- Roger Bourdin as Vogl
- Marcel Lupovici as a friend of Schubert
- Auguste Bovério as Beethoven
- Marcel Vallée as Hostlinger the editeur
- Alexandre Rignault as the policeman
- Pierre Magnier as Prince Klemens von Metternich
- René Stern as an elegant man
- Madeleine Suffel as Anny
- Claire Gérard as the owner
- Marthe Mellot as the saleswoman
- Georges Bever as Le commis
- Jacques Butin as the secretary
- Edmond Castel as L'aubergiste
- Philippe Richard as Le prieur
- Robert Arnoux as Chavert
- Henri Richard as a diplomat

== Bibliography ==
- Ascheid, Antje (2010). Hitler's Heroines: Stardom and Womanhood in Nazi Cinema. Philadelphia: Temple University Press. ISBN 978-1-59213-843-2.
- Bock, Hans-Michael; Bergfelder, Tim, eds. (2009). The Concise Cinegraph: Encyclopaedia of German Cinema. New York: Berghahn Books. ISBN 978-1-57181-655-9.
