= The Flame (1926 film) =

1926 film

- Directed by: René Hervil
- Written by: Charles Méré (play)
- Produced by: Charles Delac; Marcel Vandal
- Starring: Germaine Rouer; Charles Vanel; Henry Vibart
- Cinematography: René Guichard; Maurice Laumann
- Production company: Le Film d'Art
- Distributed by: Etablissements Louis Aubert
- Release date: 15 January 1926
- Country: France
- Languages: Silent; French intertitles

The Flame (French: La flamme) is a 1926 French silent drama film directed by René Hervil and starring Germaine Rouer, Charles Vanel and Henry Vibart. It was remade as a sound film in 1936.

== Cast ==
- Germaine Rouer as Cloé d'Aubigny
- Charles Vanel as Boussat
- Henry Vibart as Lord Sedley
- Sylviane de Castill] as La mère de Maud
- Jack Hobbs as Hugues Sedley
- Colette Darfeuil as Maud
- Robby Guichard as Hugues Sedley enfant
- Joe Alex
- Jean Diéner
- Octave Berthier
- André Courtal
- Lionel Salem as L'ami d'Hugues

== Bibliography ==
- Goble, Alan. The Complete Index to Literary Sources in Film. Walter de Gruyter, 1999.
