= Boulot the Aviator =

1937 film

- Directed by: Maurice de Canonge
- Written by: Jean Bedoin; Arnold Lippschitz
- Based on: Aventures cocasses de Boulot, aviateur by Georges de La Fouchardière and Alain Laubreaux
- Produced by: Georges Maurice; Xavier Revenaz
- Starring: Robert Arnoux; Michel Simon; Marguerite Moreno
- Cinematography: Georges Million
- Music by: Jacques Belasco
- Production companies: Lutèce Films; Trianon Film
- Distributed by: Location Film
- Release date: 16 July 1937
- Running time: 89 minutes
- Country: France
- Language: French

Boulot the Aviator (French: Boulot aviateur) is a 1937 French comedy film directed by Maurice de Canonge and starring Robert Arnoux, Michel Simon and Marguerite Moreno. It was based on the 1932 novel Aventures cocasses de Boulot, aviateur by Georges de La Fouchardière and Alain Laubreaux.

== Synopsis ==
A fake baron runs a fraudulent insurance company. His latest swindle is to try and cheat the drunken Boulot.

== Cast ==
- Robert Arnoux as Boulot
- Michel Simon as Baron Gobèche
- Marguerite Moreno as Cléôpartre de de Bérodie
- Jacqueline Daix as Fifine
- Jean Tissier as M. Squale
- Jeanne Fusier-Gir as La cuisinière
- Abel Jacquin as André Lemocot
- Albert Broquin
- Gisèle Delbart
- Lisette Missier
- Pierre Moreno
- Robert Ozanne
- Jean Sinoël
- Jean Témerson
- Jacques Vitry

== Bibliography ==
- Bessy, Maurice & Chirat, Raymond. Histoire du cinéma français: 1935-1939. Pygmalion, 1986.
- Crisp, Colin. Genre, Myth and Convention in the French Cinema, 1929-1939. Indiana University Press, 2002.
- Goble, Alan. The Complete Index to Literary Sources in Film. Walter de Gruyter, 1999.
- Rège, Philippe. Encyclopedia of French Film Directors, Volume 1. Scarecrow Press, 2009.
