= Liebelei =

1933 film

- Directed by: Max Ophüls
- Screenplay by: Curt Alexander; Hans Wilhelm; Max Ophüls
- Story by: Felix Salten
- Based on: Liebelei by Arthur Schnitzler
- Produced by: Christoph Mülleneisen; Herman Millakowsky (Pre-production)
- Starring: Magda Schneider; Wolfgang Liebeneiner; Luise Ullrich
- Cinematography: Franz Planer
- Edited by: Friedel Buckow
- Music by: Theo Mackeben
- Production company: Elite Tonfilm
- Distributed by: Metropol-Filmverleih; General Foreign Sales (US)
- Release dates: 10 March 1933 (Germany); 27 February 1936 (US)
- Running time: 88 minutes
- Country: Germany
- Language: German

Liebelei ([ˌliːbəˈlaɪ̯], lit. 'Affair') is a 1933 German period drama film directed by Max Ophüls and starring Magda Schneider, Wolfgang Liebeneiner, and Luise Ullrich.

== Plot ==
In Vienna during the late Imperial era, Lieutenant Fritz Lobheimer is having an affair with Baroness Eggersdorf. When he meets Christine, the humble daughter of a opera musician, after she has sneaked into a performance with her friend Mizzi, he is smitten. The two young people quickly fall in love. But Lobheimer is haunted by his past, which he is unable to escape: his affair with the married Baroness.

One day, the unfaithful Baroness's husband discovers evidence of her extramarital affair. Baron Eggersdorf is a man of rigid conventions, and his rank and social background demand gratification in the form of a formal satisfaction, and the nobleman challenges the young Lieutenant Lobheimer to a duel. Lobheimer's best friend, First Lieutenant Theo Kaiser, who had warned him away from the affair, tries in vain to convince the unmoving military leadership to intervene in the matter before it is too late. Lobheimer attempts to see Christine the day before the duel, but she is at an audition to realise her dream of becoming a singer, and he instead meets her father, who has encouraged the relationship over his guilt at stifling the past romantic prospects of his sister, who died unmarried. Lobheimer is fatally wounded in the duel. The Baron, his honor restored, leaves victorious.

Embittered by the completely outdated and senseless code of honor that cost his friend his young life, First Lieutenant Kaiser resigns from the army and returns to civilian life and a relationship with Mizzi. When Christine learns of her lover's death, she commits suicide by throwing herself out of the window of Lobheimer's lodgings.

== Cast ==
- Magda Schneider as Christine Weyring (Note: Schneider's daughter, Romy Schneider, played the same role in the 1958 film Christine)
- Wolfgang Liebeneiner as Lieutenant Fritz Lobheimer
- Luise Ullrich as Mizzi Schlager
- Carl Esmond as Lieutenant Theo Kaiser
- Olga Chekhova as Baronin von Eggersdorff
- Gustaf Gründgens as Baron von Eggersdorff
- Paul Hörbiger as Old Weyring, Christine's father
- Paul Otto as Major von Eggersdorf, the baron's brother

== Production ==
Liebelei was directed by Max Ophüls and produced by Elite Tonfilm. The film, based on a play of the same name (Liebelei) by Arthur Schnitzler, describes an ill-fated love affair. A 1927 silent film version was previously produced. A separate French-language version – A Love Story (1934) – was also released, using most of the original cast.

The film's sets were designed by the art director Gabriel Pellon. Location shooting took place in Berlin and Vienna.

== Release ==
After World War II the film was approved for showing in occupied Germany by the United Kingdom, but was banned by the Freiwillige Selbstkontrolle der Filmwirtschaft in 1951.

== Works cited ==
- Kelson, John (1996). Catalogue of Forbidden German Feature and Short Film Productions held in Zonal Film Archives of Film Section, Information Services Division, Control Commission for Germany, (BE) (2 ed.). Greenwood Publishing Group. ISBN 0948911190.
