= Arsene Lupin, Detective =

1937 film

- Directed by: Henri Diamant-Berger
- Written by: Henri Diamant-Berger (screenplay and dialogue); Jean Nohain (dialogue)
- Based on: L'Agence Barnett by Maurice Leblanc
- Produced by: Henri Diamant-Berger
- Starring: Jules Berry; Suzy Prim; Gabriel Signoret
- Cinematography: Maurice Desfassiaux; André Dantan
- Edited by: Marthe Leroux
- Music by: Jean Lenoir
- Production company: Le Film d'Art
- Distributed by: Distribution Parisienne de Films
- Release date: 29 April 1937 (France)
- Running time: 98 minutes
- Country: France
- Language: French

Arsene Lupin, Detective (French: Arsène Lupin détective) is a 1937 French crime film directed by Henri Diamant-Berger and starring Jules Berry, Gabriel Signoret and Suzy Prim.

== Plot ==
Arsène Lupin decides to run a detective agency in addition to being a gentleman thief. As a detective he happens to cooperate with police in order to unveil the criminal activities of a villain. When he succeeds the villain returns the favour. The unmasked Arsène Lupin manages to escape with the villain's moll as his new companion.

== Cast ==
- Jules Berry as Barnett, alias Arsène Lupin
- Gabriel Signoret as Inspector Béchoux
- Suzy Prim as Olga Vauban
- Rosine Deréan as Germaine Laurent
- Aimé Simon-Girard as the journalist
- Thomy Bourdelle as Cassire
- Mady Berry as Victoire
- Abel Jacquin as Brémond
