= Germaine Rouer =

French actress

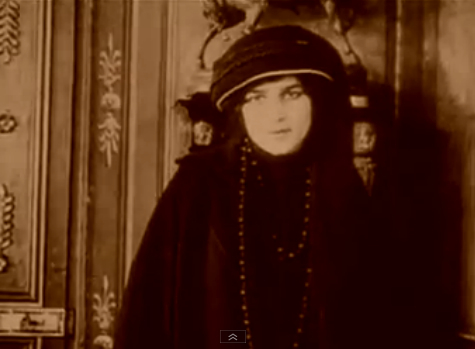
- Born: Germaine Joséphine Rouer; 2 November 1897; Paris, France
- Died: 26 December 1994 (aged 97); Paris, France
- Occupation: Actress
- Years active: 1910-1954 (film)

Germaine Rouer (1897–1994) was a French stage and film actress. She was a member of the Comédie-Française.

== Selected filmography ==
- Les Vampires (1916)
- The Earth (1921)
- The Bread Peddler (1923)
- The Flame (1926)
- The Good Reputation (1926)
- Cousin Bette (1928)
- Roger la Honte (1933)
- One Night's Secret (1934)
- Bourrasque (1935)
- The Two Boys (1936)
- The Drunkard (1937)
- Liberty (1938)
- The Woman from the End of the World (1938)
- The Tragic Dolmen (1948)
- Royal Affairs in Versailles (1954)

== Bibliography ==
- Goble, Alan. The Complete Index to Literary Sources in Film. Walter de Gruyter, 1999.
