= The Earth (1921 film) =

1921 film

The Earth (La Terre)
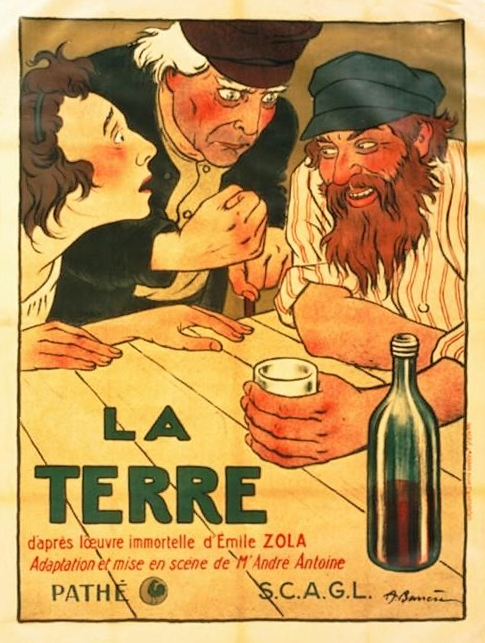
- Poster by Adrien Barrère
- Directed by: André Antoine
- Written by: André Antoine; Émile Zola
- Starring: Armand Bour; René Alexandre; Germaine Rouer; Jean Hervé
- Cinematography: Léonce-Henri Burel
- Release date: 13 October 1921
- Running time: approximately 90 minutes
- Country: France
- Language: French

The Earth (La Terre) is a silent film based on the 1887 novel of the same name by Émile Zola. It was directed by French theatre manager, André Antoine.

Antoine was notable for bringing a certain form of naturalism to the theater and films such as The Earth. Louis Feuillade observed that these dramas "eschew any fantasy and represent men and things as they are, not as they should be." Although the principal players were accomplished actors from the Comédie-Française, Antoine further heightened the film's naturalism by casting many nonprofessionals from the region in the film.

== Plot ==
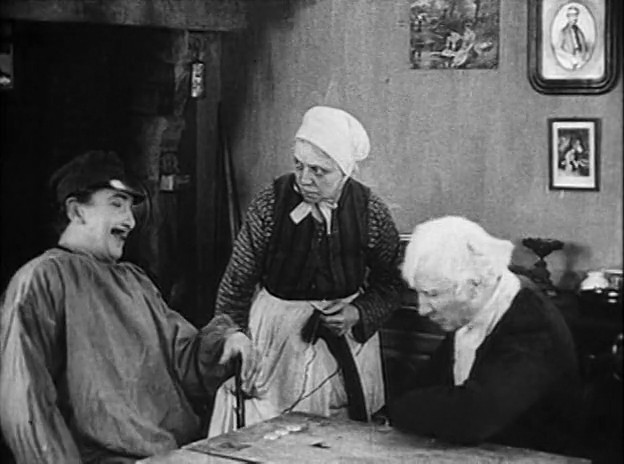
Buteau and his parents

The story takes place within the Fouan family. The elderly father Fouan (Armand Bour) decides to share his property between his children, dependent on them to house him, feed him and give him two hundred francs a year each. They do not do their job very well, especially his son, Buteau (Jean Hervé), who is gradually dispossessing Fouan of his meager fortune.

Buteau has two cousins, the Mouche sisters. He has a child by the first, Lise (Jeanne Briey), whom he married when she became a rich heiress.

Buteau and Lise confront her sister, Françoise (Germaine Rouer), in a field. Lise pushes her sister onto a scythe, severely wounding her, and she and Buteau abandon her to her fate. Francoise is taken to a house, but dies from the injury.

Father Fouan is left to wander through rain and snow, with nowhere to live.

== Location ==
- Cloyes-sur-le-Loir in the Eure-et-Loir department and the natural région of Beauce in France.
