= Lucienne Le Marchand =

Belgian actress (1908–1992)

- Born: 15 November 1908; Brussels, Belgium
- Died: 9 February 1992 (aged 83); Couilly-Pont-aux-Dames, Seine-et-Marne, France
- Occupation: Actress
- Years active: 1930-1985 (film & TV)

Lucienne Le Marchand (15 November 1908 – 9 February 1992) was a Belgian stage, film and television actress.

== Selected filmography ==
- Song of Farewell (1934)
- Crime and Punishment (1935)
- The Mysteries of Paris (1935)
- Beautiful Days (1935)
- Yoshiwara (1937)
- The Corsican Brothers (1939)
- Tobias Is an Angel (1940)
- Fantômas (1946)
- Judicial Error (1948)
- The Unexpected Voyager (1950)
- Extravagant Theodora (1950)
- The Case of Doctor Galloy (1951)
- The Red Head (1952)
- The Drunkard (1953)

Mr Klein with alain Delon (1976)

== Bibliography ==
- Goble, Alan. The Complete Index to Literary Sources in Film. Walter de Gruyter, 1999.
