= Number 33 (film) =

1933 film directed by Karl Anton

- Directed by: Karl Anton
- Written by: Alex Madis; Paul Schiller
- Based on: Number 33 by Robert Boucard and Alex Madis
- Starring: André Luguet; Edwige Feuillère; Abel Tarride
- Cinematography: Theodore J. Pahle
- Music by: Marcel Lattès
- Production company: Societé Anonyme de Production et d'Exploitation
- Distributed by: Office Cinématographique de France
- Release date: 29 September 1933
- Running time: 91 minutes
- Country: France
- Language: French

Number 33 (French: Matricule 33) is a 1933 French spy drama film directed by Karl Anton and starring André Luguet, Edwige Feuillère and Abel Tarride. The film's sets were designed by the art director Henri Menessier.

== Synopsis ==
During the First World War in 1917, a deserter from the French Army enlists with German intelligence. In fact he is an undercover agent from France. His secret is discovered by German spy Helena Schweringen, who falls in love with him.

== Cast ==
- André Luguet as André Cartault / François Villard
- Edwige Feuillère as Helena Schweringen
- Abel Tarride as Le géneral Schultz
- Camille Bert as Le commandant Denain
- Mona Dol as Mme. Cartault
- Gisèle Mars as Tipperary
- Abel Jacquin as Le prince impérial
- Marcel Barencey as le commandant Kunstle
- Léon Roger-Maxime as Behagen
- René Stern as Krafenberg
- Fernand Mailly as Holtzer

== Bibliography ==
- Bessy, Maurice & Chirat, Raymond. Histoire du cinéma français: 1929-1934. Pygmalion, 1988.
- Crisp, Colin. Genre, Myth and Convention in the French Cinema, 1929-1939. Indiana University Press, 2002.
- Goble, Alan. The Complete Index to Literary Sources in Film. Walter de Gruyter, 1999.
- Rège, Philippe. Encyclopedia of French Film Directors, Volume 1. Scarecrow Press, 2009.
