= The Citadel of Silence =

1937 film directed by Marcel L'Herbier

- Directed by: Marcel L'Herbier
- Written by: Jean Anouilh; André Cerf; T.H. Robert; J.J. Thoren
- Produced by: Joseph Lucachevitch
- Starring: Annabella; Pierre Renoir; Bernard Lancret
- Cinematography: Louis Née; Armand Thirard
- Edited by: Roger Spiri-Mercaton
- Music by: Darius Milhaud
- Production company: Impérial Film
- Distributed by: SEDIF
- Release date: 3 June 1937
- Running time: 98 minutes
- Country: France
- Language: French

The Citadel of Silence (French: La citadelle du silence) is a 1937 French drama film directed by Marcel L'Herbier and starring Annabella, Pierre Renoir and Bernard Lancret. The film's sets were designed by the art directors Andrej Andrejew and Guy de Gastyne.

== Synopsis ==
In Tsarist Russia before the First World War, a young female revolutionary attempts to kill a senior official. It is her lover who is arrested however and to try and rescue him she becomes romantically close to the commander of the fortress where he is imprisoned.

== Cast ==
- Annabella as Viana
- Pierre Renoir as Stepan
- Bernard Lancret as César Birsky
- Gilberte Géniat as Catherine
- Pauline Carton as La logeuse
- Pierre Larquey as Bartek
- Paul Amiot as Vladorowsky
- Robert Le Vigan as Granoff
- Roger Blin as Officier
- Pierre Alcover as Le gouverneur de Varsovie
- Jeanne Fusier-Gir as La fille du majordome
- Alexandre Rignault as Le gardien
- Mady Berry as Patronne de l'hôtel
- Georges Melchior as Nevitzky
- Lucas Gridoux as L'espion
- José Squinquel as Le capitaine
- Claire Gérard as La nounou
- Marguerite Pierry as La logeuse
- Marthe Mellot as Joséphine
- Denise Jovelet as Vania enfant
- Georges Saillard as Un insurgé
- Fabien Loris as Le 836
- Marcel Rouzé as Un officier à la citadelle
- Henri Échourin as Le porteur
- Fernand Bellan
- Henry Darbray
- Guy Decomble
- Georges Lannes as Kerlov
- André Nox
- Philippe Richard

== Bibliography ==
- Jonathan Driskell. The French Screen Goddess: Film Stardom and the Modern Woman in 1930s France. I.B.Tauris, 2015.
