= Marcel Lattès =

French composer (1886–1943)

- Born: 11 December 1886; Nice, France
- Died: 12 December 1943 (aged 57); Auschwitz Concentration Camp
- Occupation: Composer
- Years active: 1931-1940 (film)

Marcel Lattès (11 December 1886 – 12 December 1943) was a French composer of film scores. He worked in French cinema during the 1930s. In 1940 following the German defeat of France, the Jewish Lattès was interned before being moved to Auschwitz Concentration Camp and killed.

== Opera ==
- Le Diable à Paris

== Selected filmography ==
- When Do You Commit Suicide? (1931)
- Monsieur Albert (1932)
- The Dressmaker of Luneville (1932)
- Make-Up (1932)
- Nights in Port Said (1932)
- When Do You Commit Suicide? (1932)
- Suburban Melody (1933)
- Number 33 (1933)
- Primerose (1934)
- Fedora (1934)
- Lucrezia Borgia (1935)
- Adémaï in the Middle Ages (1935)
- Return to Paradise (1935)
- Helene (1936)
- The Secret of Polichinelle (1936)
- Death on the Run (1936)
- The Green Jacket (1937)
- In Venice, One Night (1937)
- Balthazar (1937)
- Peace on the Rhine (1938)
- Entente cordiale (1939)
- Metropolitan (1939)
- Fire in the Straw (1939)
- They Were Twelve Women (1940)

== Bibliography ==
- Waldman, Harry. Maurice Tourneur: The Life and Films. McFarland, 2001.
