= Josette Day =

French actress (1914–1978)

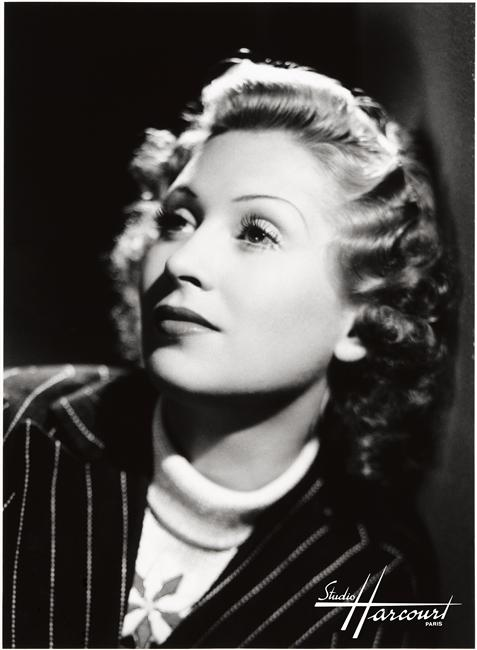
- Born: Josette Noële Andrée Claire Dagory; 31 July 1914; Paris, France
- Died: 27 June 1978 (aged 63); Paris, France
- Other name: Josette Solvay
- Occupation: Actor
- Years active: 1919–1950
- Spouse: Maurice Solvay
- Partner: Marcel Pagnol
- Children: Hinano Tiatia Dagory (adopted daughter)

Josette Noële Andrée Claire Dagory (31 July 1914 – 27 June 1978), better known as Josette Day, was a French film actress.

== Career ==
She began her career as a child actress in 1919 at the age of five. When she was 18, Day was the mistress of Paul Morand. Later on she got into a relationship with famous French writer and director Marcel Pagnol, whom she met in January 1939. The relationship lasted up until part of World War II and she did not marry him.

In 1946, she played her best-known role, alongside Jean Marais, as Belle in Jean Cocteau's 1946 film Beauty and the Beast.Her films include; Allo Berlin? Ici Paris! (1932), The Merry Monarch (based on Les Aventures du roi Pausole) (1933), Lucrèce Borgia (1935), L'homme du jour (1937), Accord final (1938), and Les Parents terribles (1948).

Despite numerous parts in famous French films, Day ended her career as an actress in 1950 when she was 36 years old. She retired to marry wealthy chemical businessman Maurice Solvay (descendant of Ernest Solvay, founder of the notable Solvay company). In February 1959, while on cruise in the Pacific, she and Solvay met a Tahitian girl at a Papeete market. The girl's name was Hinano Tiatia. The couple took her under their legal guardianship. However, she became the center of Solvay's inheritance dispute, having not been adopted at the time of his sudden death in 1960.

== Selected filmography ==
- Here's Berlin (1932)
- The Regiment's Champion (1932)
- Miss Helyett (1933)
- Colomba (1933)
- The Barber of Seville (1933)
- The Concierge's Daughters (1934)
- Mam'zelle Spahi (1934)
- Coralie and Company (1934)
- Antonia (1935)
- His Excellency Antonin (1935)
- Lucrezia Borgia (1935)
- Women's Club (1936)
- The Flame (1936)
- Ménilmontant (1936)
- Sisters in Arms (1937)
- The Man of the Hour (1937)
- Monsieur Bégonia (1937)
- Final Accord (1938)
- Education of a Prince (1938)
- The Patriot (1938)
- The Five Cents of Lavarede (1939)
- Monsieur Brotonneau (1939)
- The Well-Digger's Daughter (1940)
- The Crossroads (1942)
- Arlette and Love (1943)
- Beauty and the Beast (1946)
- Les Parents terribles (1948)
- Swiss Tour (1950)
- Love, Madame (1952)
