= Jeanne Cheirel =

French actress (1869–1934)

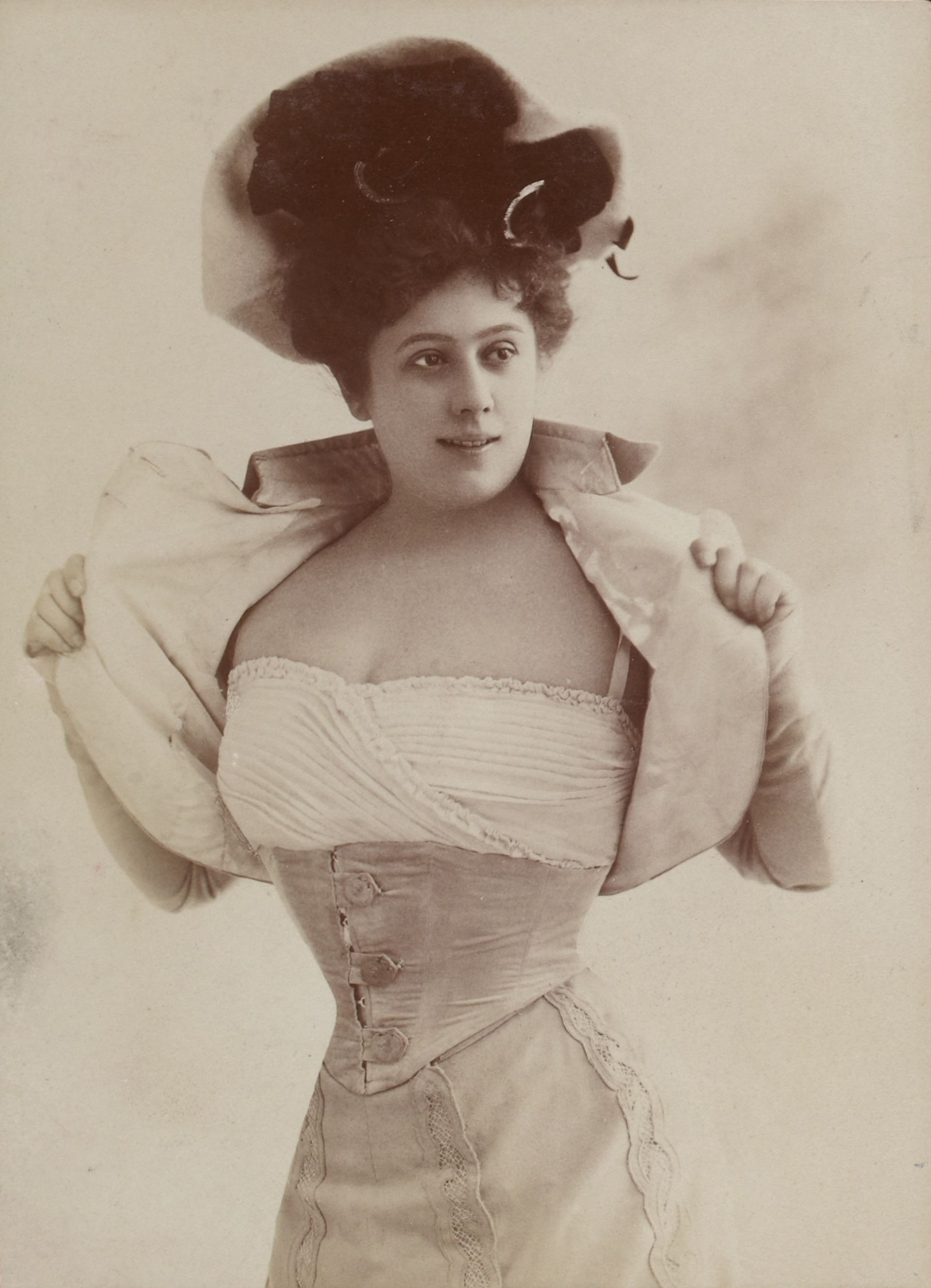
- Born: Jeanne Augustine Baltazar; 18 March 1869; Paris, French Empire
- Died: 2 November 1934 (aged 64); Paris, France
- Occupation: Actress
- Years active: 1909–1934 (film)

Jeanne Cheirel (born Jeanne Augustine Baltazar; 18 March 1869 – 2 November 1934) was a French film and stage actress. She was in the original cast of two of Georges Feydeau's plays Tied by the Leg (1894) and The Turkey (1896). She made her screen debut in a 1909 short film and continued acting in cinema until her death in 1934. She was the aunt of the actress Micheline Cheirel.

== Selected filmography ==
- Germinal (1913)
- Flipotte (1920)
- Crainquebille (1922)
- My Aunt from Honfleur (1931)
- Moonlight (1932)
- Let's Touch Wood (1933)
- The Weaker Sex (1933)
- The Concierge's Daughters (1934)
- The Secret of Polichinelle (1934)
- My Heart Is Calling You (1934)
- Miquette (1934)

== Bibliography ==
- Goble, Alan. The Complete Index to Literary Sources in Film. Walter de Gruyter, 1999.
- Greco, Joseph. The File on Robert Siodmak in Hollywood, 1941-1951. Universal-Publishers, 1999.
