= Bernard Lancret =

French actor

- Born: 4 September 1912; Gonesse, France
- Died: 5 September 1983 (aged 71); Mougins, France
- Occupation: Film actor
- Years active: 1935–1956

Bernard Lancret (4 September 1912 – 5 September 1983) was a French film actor. He appeared in over thirty films between 1935 and 1956 in a mixture of leading and supporting roles. He played the composer Franz Schubert in the 1940 film Sérénade. He played the painter Julien Breughel in the 1935 film Carnival in Flanders.

== Selected filmography ==
- The Queen and the Cardinal (1935)
- Carnival in Flanders (1935)
- Valse royale (1936)
- The Two Girls (1936)
- The Flame (1936)
- Ménilmontant (1936)
- Wolves Between Them (1936)
- The Secret of Polichinelle (1936)
- The Drunkard (1937)
- The Citadel of Silence (1937)
- A Man to Kill (1937)
- Maman Colibri (1938)
- The Chess Player (1938)
- Ultimatum (1938)
- Heroes of the Marne (1938)
- Immediate Call (1939)
- Latin Quarter (1939)
- Entente cordiale (1939)
- Serenade (1940)
- Foolish Husbands (1941)
- Twisted Mistress (1942)
- Pierre and Jean (1943)
- Le Corbeau (1943)
- Not So Stupid (1946)
- Hyménée (1947)
- The Story of Dr. Louise (1947)
- Julietta (1953)

== Bibliography ==
- Grossvogel, David I. Marianne and the Puritan: Transformations of the Couple in French and American Films. Lexington Books, 2005.
- Jung, Uli & Schatzberg, Walter. Beyond Caligari: The Films of Robert Wiene. Berghahn Books, 1999.
