= Théâtre de l'Étoile (Champs-Élysées) =

Former theatre in Paris, France

Coordinates: 48.873°N 2.299°E

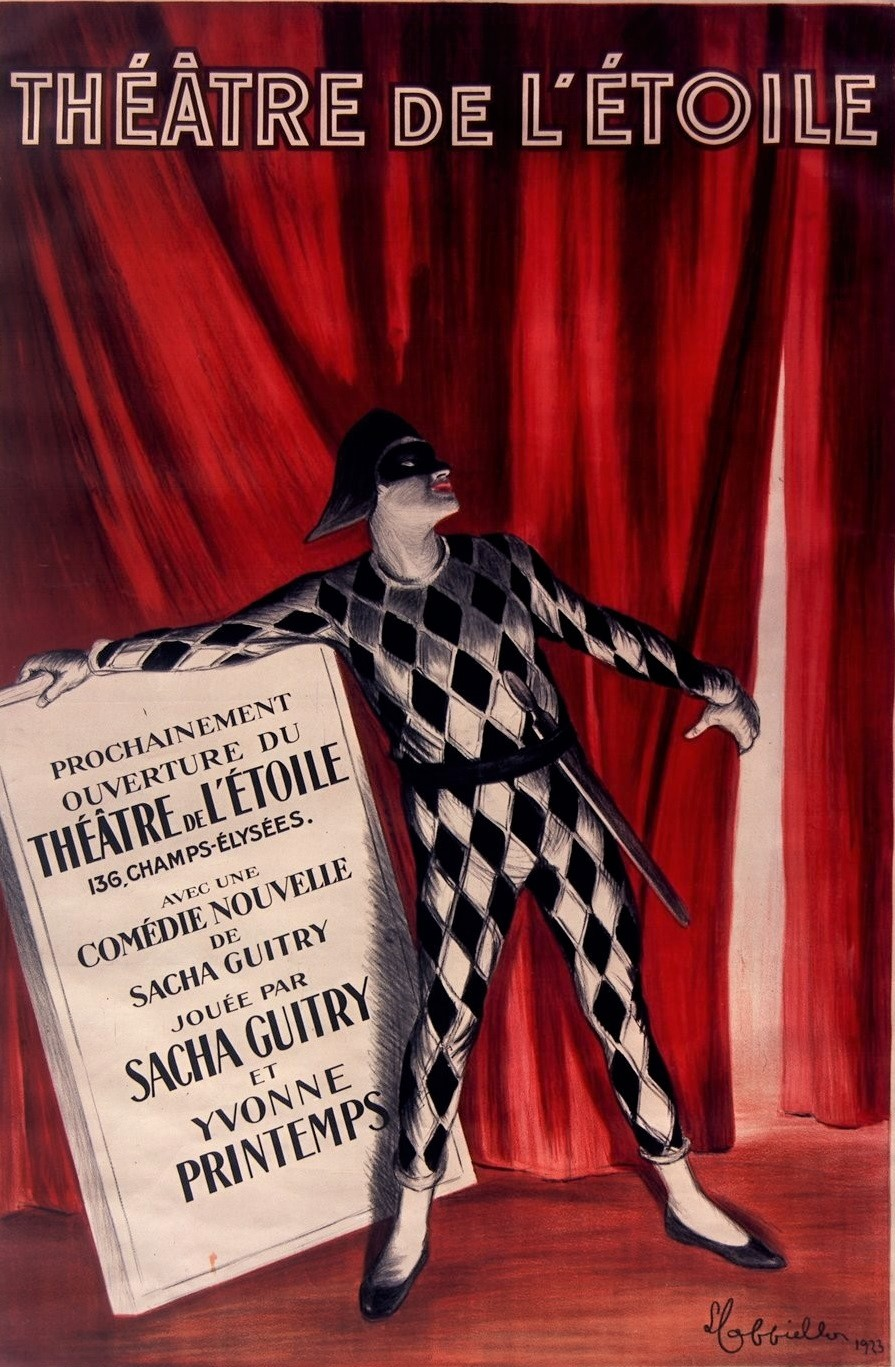
Poster for the premiere of Sacha Guitry's comedy L'Accroche-cœur at the Théâtre de l'Étoile in 1923

The Théâtre de l'Étoile was a theatre located at 136 Avenue des Champs-Élysées in the 8th arrondissement of Paris. It was built in 1923 and operated as a theatre until 1926. It is not to be confused with a completely unrelated theatre, also called Théâtre de l'Étoile, which operated from 1928 to 1964 on the Avenue Wagram.

== History ==
The theatre was built on the initiative of the playwright, director, and theatre manager Alphonse Franck who at the time was also the manager of the Théâtre Édouard VII. The new theatre, decorated in a colour scheme of red and gold, was situated on the first floor of a building on the corner of Avenue des Champs-Élysées and Rue Balzac. The building's penthouse was occupied by the flamboyant art collector and interior designer Carlos de Beistegui.

Under Franck's direction the theatre staged Sacha Guitry's comedy L'Accroche-cœur in 1923 and Revue de Printemps in 1924, both starring Guitry and his then-wife Yvonne Printemps. Both were very successful, but subsequent productions of the operettas Amants légitimes and Pouche (with a libretto by Franck) were commercial failures.

In 1925 Franck sold the Étoile to Camille Choisy, the manager of the Théâtre du Grand-Guignol, and Jacques Jouvin, one of the directors there. At the Étoile, they premiered René Mercier's operetta Le Pêché capiteux starring Arletty in September 1925 and in November staged Josephine Baker's show La Revue nègre after its initial run at the Théâtre des Champs-Élysées.

The theatre closed definitively in early 1926 after which it became a dance and cabaret hall operating under a variety of names in the ensuing years: "L'Embassy", "Le panache", and "La joie dans la cave". It was eventually demolished and replaced by offices and shops.
