= My Aunt from Honfleur (1931 film) =

1931 film directed by André Gillois

- Directed by: André Gillois
- Written by: Henri Diamant-Berger
- Based on: My Aunt from Honfleur by Paul Gavault
- Produced by: Henri Diamant-Berger; Robert Amsler; Pierre Marcel
- Starring: Florelle; Jim Gérald; Jeanne Cheirel
- Cinematography: Maurice Desfassiaux
- Music by: Jean Lenoir
- Production companies: Les Films Diamant; Les Films Era
- Distributed by: Compagnie Universelle Cinématographique
- Release date: 11 March 1932
- Running time: 85 minutes
- Country: France
- Language: French

My Aunt from Honfleur (French: Ma tante d'Honfleur) is a 1931 French comedy film directed by André Gillois and starring Florelle, Jim Gérald and Jeanne Cheirel. It is based on the 1914 play My Aunt from Honfleur by Paul Gavault. Produced in 1931 it was not given a full release until March the following year.

== Cast ==
- Florelle as Albertine
- Jim Gérald as Charles Berthier
- Jeanne Cheirel as La tante d'Honfleur
- Charles Fallot as M. Dorlange
- Louisa de Mornand as Mme Dorlange
- Yvonne Garat as Yvonne Leblond
- Robert Goupil as Clément
- Daniel Lecourtois as Adolphe
- Robert Pizani as le docteur Douce
- Rolla France as Lucette

== Bibliography ==
- Goble, Alan. The Complete Index to Literary Sources in Film. Walter de Gruyter, 1999.
