= The Concierge's Daughters =

1934 film

- Directed by: Jacques Tourneur
- Written by: Jean-Georges Auriol; Georges de La Fouchardière
- Produced by: Óscar Dancigers
- Starring: Jeanne Cheirel; Paul Azaïs; Josette Day
- Cinematography: Michel Kelber; Marcel Soulié
- Music by: Georges Van Parys
- Production company: Azed Films
- Distributed by: GFR
- Release date: 1 June 1934
- Running time: 80 minutes
- Country: France
- Language: French

The Concierge's Daughters (French: Les filles de la concierge) is a 1934 French comedy film directed by Jacques Tourneur and starring Jeanne Cheirel, Paul Azaïs and Josette Day. The film's sets were designed by the art director Robert Gys.

== Synopsis ==
The three daughters of the concierge Madame Leclerc set out to find husbands.

== Cast ==
- Jeanne Cheirel as Madame Leclerc
- Paul Azaïs as Albert
- Josette Day as Suzanne Leclerc
- Ghislaine Bru as Lucie Leclerc
- Marcel André as Gaston Rival
- Youcca Troubetzkov as Henry Robertson
- Pierre Nay as Jacques
- Maximilienne as Mme Fallempin
- Germaine Aussey as Ginette Leclerc
- Émile Saint-Ober as Edgar

== Bibliography ==
- Waldman, Harry. Maurice Tourneur: The Life and Films. McFarland, 2001.
