= Robert Pizani =

French actor

- Pizani in 1925
- Born: Robert André Louis Pizany; 26 April 1896; Paris, France
- Died: 17 June 1965 (aged 69); Paris, France
- Occupations: Stage and film actor

Robert Pizani (26 April 1896 – 17 June 1965) was a French stage and film actor whose 45-year career encompassed leading roles in numerous plays, revues and operettas as well as dozens of films.

== In operetta ==
Pizani's roles in operetta and musical theatre include:

- Amants légitimes by Fernand Mallet (1924) Théâtre de l'Étoile, as Le Comte de Puyssec (world premiere)
- Monsieur Beaucaire by André Messager (1925) Théâtre Marigny, as Nash (French premiere)
- Pouche by Henri Hirschmann (1925) Théâtre de l'Étoile, as Alfred (world premiere)
- La Teresina by Oscar Straus (1928) Théâtre des Folies-Wagram, as Prince Borghese (premiere of French version)
- Tip-Toes by George Gershwin (1929) Théâtre des Folies-Wagram, as Oncle Puff (French premiere)
- Brummell by Reynaldo Hahn (1931) Théâtre des Folies-Wagram, as Beau Brummell (world premiere)
- Les Petites Cardinal by Arthur Honegger and Jacques Ibert (1938) Théâtre des Bouffes-Parisiens, as Le Marquis de Cavalcanti (world premiere)
- Leurs majestés by Hans Lang (1939) Théâtre Pigalle, as Ministre Chrystoforidis (French premiere)

== Filmography ==
Pizani's film roles include:

- Un gentleman neurasthénique (1924)
- La grande amie (1927) as L'imitateur de Grock
- J'ai l'noir ou le Suicide de Dranem (1929)
- My Aunt from Honfleur (1931)
- Azaïs (1931) as Stromboli
- La chauve-souris (1932)
- Une nuit au paradis (1932) as Alain Harris
- Le petit écart (1932) as Pianiste
- Les amours de Pergolèse (1933) as Nicolas d'Arcangioli
- I'll Always Love You (1933) as Oscar, il parruchiere
- Je vous aimerai toujours (1933) as Oscar
- The Heir of the Bal Tabarin (1933) as Le danseur
- Le supplice de Tantale (1933)
- Miss Helyett (1933) as Bacarel
- Une fois dans la vie (1934) as Gallivert
- The Midnight Prince (1934) as Le comte Maritza
- L'auberge du Petit-Dragon (1934) as Le cabot
- Les hommes de la côte (1934)
- The Imaginary Invalid (1934) as Thomas Diafoirus
- Le billet de mille (1935) as Un professeur qui joue aux courses
- His Excellency Antonin (1935) as Le Baron
- Coup de vent (1936)
- Rigolboche (1936) as Lecor, le croupier
- Les petites alliées (1936) as Lohéac
- L'homme du jour (1937) as Le poète efféminé
- La loupiote (1937) as Maxime
- La pocharde (1937) as Moëb
- La reine des resquilleuses (1937)
- L'amour veille (1937) as Carteret
- The Pearls of the Crown (1937) as Talleyrand
- Hercule (1938) as Le premier frère Riquel
- Café de Paris (1938) as L'auteur dramatique
- Alerte en Méditerranée (1938) as Le médecin du port
- Entrée des artistes (1938) as Jérome
- Monsieur Coccinelle (1938) as Illusio
- Remontons les Champs-Élysées (1938) as Richard Wagner / Jacques Offenbach / Olivier Métra
- Blood Red Rose (1939)
- La boutique aux illusions (1939) as Le spectateur
- Entente cordiale (1939) as Paul Cambon
- La belle revanche (1939) as Casimir Bouchot
- Jeunes filles en détresse (1939) as Monsieur Tarrand
- Paradis perdu (1940) as Le couturier Bernard Lesage
- Le président Haudecoeur (1940) as L'abbé Margot
- Facing Destiny (1940) as Le couturier
- Béatrice devant le désir (1944) as Alfred
- Les Petites du quai aux fleurs (1944) as Un médecin
- Coup de tête (1944) as Le maître d'hôtel (uncredited)
- Box of Dreams (1945) as Oncle André
- Quartier chinois (1947) as Le chef de la police
- Le Silence est d'or (1947) as M. Duperrier
- L'éventail (1947) as Le consul Alvaro Gomez
- Mandrin (1947) as Voltaire
- Une grande fille toute simple (1948) as Etienne
- The Tragic Dolmen (1948) as Châtelard
- The Cupboard Was Bare (1948) as Le médecin
- The Woman I Murdered (1948) as Arthur de Selve
- Drame au Vel'd'Hiv' (1949) as Stern
- Rome Express (1950) as Cornaglia
- Prelude to Glory (1950) as Floriot
- Tête blonde (1950) as Martin
- The Prettiest Sin in the World (1951) as Clément Lebreton
- A Girl on the Road (1952) as Michel de Romeuil
- The Nude Dancer (1952) as Grégor
- J'y suis... j'y reste (1953) as Le Cardinal de Tramone
- Les révoltés de Lomanach (1954) as Philippe
- Deadlier Than the Male (1956) as Le Président
- Fernandel the Dressmaker (1956) as Le Baron
- It Happened in Aden (1956) as Hubert Robert
- Les carottes sont cuites (1956)
- Paris, Palace Hotel (1956) as Georges - le maître d'hôtel du palace
- Honoré de Marseille (1956) as Baccala
- Le grand bluff (1957) (uncredited)
- Folies-Bergère (1957) as Clairval
- Sénéchal the Magnificent (1957) as Le prince Alexandre
- La Parisienne (1957) as Ambassador Mouchkine
- Premier mai (1958) as Saint-Bertin
- La Violetera (1958) as Maestro
- Boulevard (1960) as Paulo
- Le Capitaine Fracasse (1961) as Blazius
- Le petit garçon de l'ascenseur (1962) (final film role)
