= Max Ophüls =

German-French film director (1902–1957)

- Born: Maximillian Oppenheimer; 6 May 1902; Saarbrücken, German Empire
- Died: 26 March 1957 (aged 54); Hamburg, West Germany
- Resting place: Père Lachaise Cemetery, Paris, France
- Other names: Max Opuls; Ophuls
- Citizenship: Germany; France (from 1938)
- Occupations: Director; screenwriter; art director
- Years active: 1931–1957
- Spouse: Hildegard Wall (m. 1926)
- Children: Marcel Ophuls

Maximillian Oppenheimer (6 May 1902 – 26 March 1957), known as Max Ophüls (AW-fəlss or OH-fəlss), was a German and French film director, screenwriter and art director. He was known for his opulent and lyrical visual style, with heavy use of tracking shots, and his melancholic, romantic themes. The Harvard Film Archive has called Ophüls "a supreme stylist of the cinema and a master storyteller".

A refugee from Nazi Germany, Ophüls worked in Germany (1931–33), France (1933–40 and 1950–57), and the United States (1947–50). He made nearly 30 films, the latter ones being especially notable: Letter from an Unknown Woman (1948), The Reckless Moment (1949), La Ronde (1950), Le Plaisir (1952), The Earrings of Madame de… (1953), and Lola Montès (1955).

== Early life ==
Ophüls was born Maximillian Oppenheimer in Saarbrücken, Germany, the son of Leopold Oppenheimer, a Jewish textile manufacturer and owner of several textile shops in Germany, and his wife Helene Oppenheimer (née Bamberger). He took the pseudonym Ophüls during the early part of his theatrical career so that, should he fail, it would not embarrass his father.

== Career ==
Initially envisioning an acting career, he started as a stage actor in 1919 and played at the Aachen Theatre from 1921 to 1923. He then worked as a theater director, becoming the first director at the city theater of Dortmund. Ophüls moved into theatre production in 1924. He became creative director of the Burgtheater in Vienna in 1926.

Having had 200 plays to his credit, he turned to film production in 1929, when he became a dialogue director under Anatole Litvak at UFA in Berlin. He worked throughout Germany and in 1931 directed his first film, the comedy short Dann schon lieber Lebertran (literally In This Case, Rather Cod-Liver Oil).

Of his early films, the most acclaimed is Liebelei (1933), which has a number of the elements for which he became known: luxurious sets, a feminist attitude, and a duel between a younger and an older man.

=== Exile and postwar career ===
Predicting the Nazi ascendancy, Ophüls, a Jew, fled to France in 1933 after the Reichstag fire and became a French citizen in 1938. After France fell to Germany, he traveled through Switzerland and Italy, where he had directed Everybody's Woman (1934). In July 1941, before leaving for the United States, he stayed in Portugal, in Estoril, at Casa Mar e Sol. Once in Hollywood, championed by director Preston Sturges, a longtime fan, he directed a number of distinguished films.

His first Hollywood film was the Douglas Fairbanks, Jr. vehicle The Exile (1947). Ophüls's Letter from an Unknown Woman (1948), derived from a Stefan Zweig novella, is the most highly regarded of the American films. Caught (1949) and The Reckless Moment (1949) followed before his return to Europe in 1950.

Back in France, Ophüls directed and collaborated on the adaptation of Arthur Schnitzler's La Ronde (1950), which won the 1951 BAFTA Award for Best Film, and Lola Montès (1955), starring Martine Carol and Peter Ustinov, as well as Le Plaisir and The Earrings of Madame de... (1953), the latter with Danielle Darrieux and Charles Boyer, which capped his career.

== Style ==
All his works feature his distinctive smooth camera movements, complex crane and dolly sweeps, and tracking shots.

Ophüls' style inspired Stanley Kubrick, who once stated that Ophüls "did some brilliant work. I particularly admired his fluid camera techniques."

Paul Thomas Anderson gave an introduction on the restored DVD of The Earrings of Madame de... (1953).

Some of his films are narrated from the point of view of the female protagonist. Film scholars have analyzed films such as Liebelei (1933), Letter from an Unknown Woman (1948), and Madame de... (1953) as examples of the woman's film genre. Nearly all of his female protagonists had names beginning with "L" (Leonora, Lisa, Lucia, Louise, Lola, etc.)

Actor James Mason, who worked with Ophüls on two films, wrote a short poem about the director's love for tracking shots and elaborate camera movements:

A shot that does not call for tracks
Is agony for poor dear Max,
Who, separated from his dolly,
Is wrapped in deepest melancholy.
Once, when they took away his crane,
I thought he'd never smile again.

== Personal life ==
At the Burgtheater, Ophüls met the actress Hildegard "Hilde" Wall. They married in 1926, remaining together until his death. Their son, Marcel Ophüls, became a prominent documentarian, director of The Sorrow and the Pity and other films examining the nature of political power.

=== Death ===
Ophüls died from rheumatic heart disease on 26 March 1957 in Hamburg, while shooting interiors on Montparnasse 19, a biopic of Amedeo Modigliani, and was buried in Le Père Lachaise Cemetery in Paris. This final film was completed by his friend Jacques Becker.

== Legacy ==
The annual Filmfestival Max Ophüls Preis in Saarbrücken is named after him.

== Filmography ==
=== Feature films ===
Year	Title		Country	Notes
Year	Original	English	Country	Notes
1931	Die verliebte Firma	The Company's in Love	Germany	
1932	Die verkaufte Braut	The Bartered Bride	Germany	
1933	Liebelei		Germany	
1933	Une histoire d'amour		Germany	French-language version of Liebelei
1933	Lachende Erben	Laughing Heirs	Germany	
1933	On a volé un homme	A Man Has Been Stolen	France	Lost film
1934	La signora di tutti	Everybody's Woman	Italy	
1935	Divine		France	
1936	Komedie om geld	The Trouble With Money	Netherlands	
1936	La Tendre Ennemie	The Tender Enemy	France	
1937	Yoshiwara		France	
1938	Le Roman de Werther	The Novel of Werther	France	
1939	Sans lendemain	There's No Tomorrow	France	
1940	L'École des femmes		France	Unfinished film
1940	De Mayerling à Sarajevo	From Mayerling to Sarajevo	France	
1946	Vendetta	Vendetta	United States	Uncredited; fired during filming
1947	The Exile	The Exile	United States	
1948	Letter from an Unknown Woman	Letter from an Unknown Woman	United States	
1949	Caught	Caught	United States	
1949	The Reckless Moment	The Reckless Moment	United States	
1950	La Ronde	Roundabout	France	
1952	Le Plaisir	House of Pleasure	France	
1953	Madame de...	The Earrings of Madame de...	France	
1955	Lola Montès		France, West Germany	
1958	Montparnasse 19		France, Italy, West Germany	Uncredited; died during filming and replaced by Jacques Becker

=== Short films ===
Year	Title		Country	Notes
Year	Original	English	Country	Notes
1931	Dann schon lieber Lebertran	I'd Rather Have Cod Liver Oil	Germany	
1936	Ave Maria		France	Documentary short
1936	Valse brillante de Chopin		France	Documentary short

== Awards and nominations ==
Institution	Year	Category	Work	Result
Academy Awards	1952	Best Writing, Screenplay	La Ronde	Nominated
Academy Awards	1955	Best Production Design	Le Plaisir	Nominated
Berlin International Film Festival	1966	FIPRESCI Prize - Honorable	"For the body of his work"	Won
Cahiers du Cinéma	1955	Annual Top 10 List	Lola Montès	4th place
Venice Film Festival	1934	Corporations Ministry Cup	Everybody's Woman	Nominated
Venice Film Festival	1934	Best Italian Film	Everybody's Woman	Nominated
Venice Film Festival	1936	Best Foreign Film	The Tender Enemy	Nominated
Venice Film Festival	1950	Golden Lion	La Ronde	Nominated
Venice Film Festival	1950	Best Screenplay	La Ronde	Won

== Bibliography ==
- Max Ophüls (1959), Spiel im Dasein. Eine Rückblende. Mit einem Nachwort von Hilde Ophüls und einer Einführung von Friedrich Luft, sowie achtzehn Abbildungen (autobiography), Stuttgart: Henry Goverts Verlag (posthumously published).

== See also ==
- List of German-speaking Academy Award winners and nominees
