= Abel Jacquin =

French actor

- Born: 16 July 1893; Colombes, France
- Died: 12 May 1968 (aged 74); Colombes, France
- Occupation: Film actor
- Years active: 1930 - 1956

Abel Jacquin (1893–1968) was a French actor who appeared in more than thirty films between 1930 and 1956. Jacquin co-directed the 1933 comedy film Les deux 'Monsieur' de Madame. He was also noted for his narration of the 1933 documentary Land Without Bread.

== Selected filmography ==
- Paris by Night (1930)
- Number 33 (1933)
- Lovers and Thieves (1935)
- Anne-Marie (1936)
- Boulot the Aviator (1937)
- Southern Mail (1937)
- Arsene Lupin, Detective (1937)
- White Cargo (1937)
- Blanchette (1937)
- Princess Tarakanova (1938)
- Gibraltar (1938)
- Peace on the Rhine (1938)
- Ultimatum (1938)
- The Spirit of Sidi-Brahim (1939)
- Pétrus (1946)
- The Bouquinquant Brothers (1947)
- Counter Investigation (1947)
- Man to Men (1948)
- Woman Without a Past (1948)
- At the Grand Balcony (1949)
- Skipper Next to God (1951)
- The Unfrocked One (1954)
- The Babes in the Secret Service (1956)

== Bibliography ==
- Aitken, Ian (ed). The Concise Routledge Encyclopedia of the Documentary Film. Routledge, 2013.
- Jung, Uli & Schatzberg, Walter. Beyond Caligari: The Films of Robert Wiene. Berghahn Books, 1999.
