= Blanchette (1937 film) =

1937 film

- Directed by: Pierre Caron
- Written by: Carlo Rim
- Based on: Blanchette by Eugène Brieux
- Produced by: Jean Lévy-Srauss
- Starring: Marie Bell; Jean Martinelli; Abel Tarride
- Cinematography: Alain Douarinou
- Music by: Vincent Scotto
- Production company: Films J.L.S.
- Distributed by: Les Films Vog
- Release date: 12 March 1937
- Running time: 89 minutes
- Country: France
- Language: French

Blanchette is a 1937 French drama film directed by Pierre Caron and starring Marie Bell, Jean Martinelli and Abel Tarride. It is based on the 1892 play of the same title by Eugène Brieux, which had previously been made into the 1921 silent film Blanchette. The film's sets were designed by the art director Jean Douarinou.

== Cast ==
- Marie Bell as Blanchette Rousset
- Jean Martinelli as Georges Galoux
- Abel Tarride as M. Galoux
- Mady Berry as Mamam Rousset
- Charles Granval as Papa Rousset
- Jean Tissier as M. Max
- Édouard Delmont as Bonenfant
- Milly Mathis as Mme Jules, la cuisinière
- Léon Arvel as Barbaroux
- Laurence Atkins as Lucie Galoux
- Charlotte Barbier-Krauss as La chômeuse
- Guy Berry as Le chanteur
- Doumel as Le facteur
- Pierre Finaly as Un client
- Jeanne Fusier-Gir as Mme Michu
- Abel Jacquin as Auguste Morillon
- Marcel Maupi as Le joueur de boules
- Henri Poupon as Morillon

== Bibliography ==
- Bessy, Maurice & Chirat, Raymond. Histoire du cinéma français: 1935-1939. Pygmalion, 1986.
- Crisp, Colin. Genre, Myth and Convention in the French Cinema, 1929-1939. Indiana University Press, 2002.
- Goble, Alan. The Complete Index to Literary Sources in Film. Walter de Gruyter, 1999.
- Rège, Philippe. Encyclopedia of French Film Directors, Volume 1. Scarecrow Press, 2009.
