= Theodore J. Pahle =

American cinematographer

- Born: 23 August 1899
- Died: 9 January 1979 (aged 79); New York, United States
- Occupation: Cinematographer
- Years active: 1928-1959 (film)

Theodore J. Pahle (1899–1979) was an American cinematographer who worked in the film industries of several countries. He is also known as Ted Pahle.

== Selected filmography ==
- East Side, West Side (1927)
- Stolen Love (1928)
- The Jazz Age (1929)
- The Lights of Buenos Aires (1931)
- A Gentleman in Tails (1931)
- Marius (1931)
- The Improvised Son (1932)
- To Live Happily (1932)
- Number 33 (1933)
- The Premature Father (1933)
- A Love Story (1933)
- Monsieur Sans-Gêne (1935)
- Bux the Clown (1935)
- Tomfoolery (1936)
- Catherine the Last (1936)
- Romance (1936)
- Court Theatre (1936)
- Hannerl and Her Lovers (1936)
- The Alibi (1937)
- Ultimatum (1938)
- Gibraltar (1938)
- Storm Over Asia (1938)
- Conflict (1938)
- The Lafarge Case (1938)
- Bel Ami (1939)
- Entente cordiale (1939)
- The Unloved Woman (1940)
- The Queen's Flower Girl (1940)
- The Reluctant Hero (1941)
- Madrid Carnival (1941)
- It Happened in Damascus (1943)
- Idols (1943)
- Just Any Woman (1949)
- The Captain from Loyola (1949)
- The Duchess of Benameji (1949)
- Agustina of Aragon (1950)
- Spanish Serenade (1952)
- Lola the Coalgirl (1952)
- Last Day (1952)
- The Cheerful Caravan (1953)
- All Is Possible in Granada (1954)
- Señora Ama (1955)

== Bibliography ==
- John T. Soister. Conrad Veidt on Screen: A Comprehensive Illustrated Filmography. McFarland, 2002.
