= Kiss Me (1932 film) =

French comedy film

- Directed by: Léon Mathot
- Written by: Tristan Bernard (play); Jean Boyer; Yves Mirande (play); Gustave Quinson (play)
- Produced by: Joseph N. Ermolieff
- Starring: Georges Milton; Abel Tarride; Tania Fédor
- Cinematography: René Gaveau
- Music by: René Mercier; Vincent Scotto
- Release date: 21 October 1932
- Running time: 89 minutes
- Country: France
- Language: French

Kiss Me (French: Embrassez-moi) is a 1932 French comedy film directed by Léon Mathot and starring Georges Milton, Abel Tarride and Tania Fédor.

== Cast ==
- Georges Milton as Boucatel
- Abel Tarride as Le marquis de Champavert
- Tania Fédor as Aurore de Champavert
- Jeanne Helbling as La comtesse
- Maurice Escande as Gaston
- Raymonde Bonnet as Géraldine
- Odette Valensay as Émérantine
- Sinoël as Leclerc
- Georges Tréville as Lord Ashwell
- Albert Beauval as Le vicomte
- Bazin as Norbert
- Julien Clément as Joseph

== See also ==
- Kiss Me (1929)

== Bibliography ==
- Crisp, Colin. Genre, Myth and Convention in the French Cinema, 1929-1939. Indiana University Press, 2002.
