= Ultimatum (1938 film) =

1938 film

- Directed by: Robert Wiene; Robert Siodmak
- Written by: Ewald Bertram (novel); Pierre Allary; Alexandre Arnoux; Léo Lania
- Produced by: Herman Millakowsky; Robert Wiene
- Starring: Dita Parlo; Erich von Stroheim; Abel Jacquin; Bernard Lancret
- Cinematography: Robert Lefebvre; Jacques Mercanton; Theodore J. Pahle
- Edited by: Tonka Taldy
- Music by: Adolphe Borchard
- Production company: Films Ultimatum
- Distributed by: Forrester-Parant (France)[Milo Films (other markets)
- Release date: 27 October 1938
- Running time: 83 minutes
- Country: France
- Language: French

Ultimatum is a 1938 French historical drama film directed by Robert Wiene and Robert Siodmak and starring Dita Parlo, Erich von Stroheim and Abel Jacquin. The film's plot is set in 1914 against the backdrop of the July Crisis between the assassination of Archduke Franz Ferdinand and the beginning of the First World War. It focuses on the relationship between a Serbian officer and his Austrian-born wife and their involvement in espionage between the countries.

It was the final film of Wiene, who had been a leading director of German cinema particularly noted for his work on expressionist films during the silent era. He died shortly before the film's completion, and it was finished by Siodmak.

== Production and reception ==
Wiene had been forced into exile from Germany following the Nazi rise to power. During the four years since his previous film A Night in Venice (1934) he had been struggling to raise financing in London and Paris for his projects and had not made a single film. The film was based on the novel Days Before the Storm by Ewald Bertram. The film's title refers to the Austrian ultimatum issued to Serbia shortly before the outbreak of war.

Because of the film's casting of Parlo and von Stroheim and its war-theme, it drew comparisons with Jean Renoir's La Grande Illusion (1937).

== Cast ==
- Dita Parlo as Anna Salic
- Erich von Stroheim as General Simovic
- Abel Jacquin as Captain Karl Burgstaller
- Bernard Lancret as Cmdr. Stanko Salic
- Georges Rollin as Lt. Ristic
- Marcel André as Legrain
- Raymond Aimos as Usir
- Lila Kedrova as Irina
- Pierre Nay as Officier serbe
- René Alié as Officier serve
- Nino Constantini as Officier serbe
- Lucien Pascal as Colonel serbe
- André Nox as L'excellence
- Georges Vitray as Le général autrichien
- Jacques Henley as Le général serbe
- Georges Paulais as Le médecin major
- Frédéric Mariotti as Le chef de patrouille
- Frédéric O'Brady as Journaliste serbe
- Louis Vonelly as Diplomate
- Marcel Pérès as Soldat autrichien

== Bibliography ==
- Jung, Uli & Schatzberg, Walter. Beyond Caligari: The Films of Robert Wiene. Berghahn Books, 1999.
