= Gabriel Signoret =

French actor

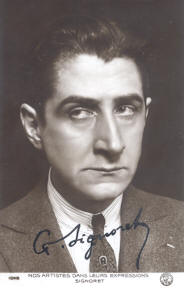
- Born: November 15, 1878; Paris, France
- Died: March 16, 1937 (aged 58); Paris, France
- Occupation: actor
- Years active: 1910—1938

Gabriel Signoret (November 15, 1878 – March 16, 1937, in Paris, France) was a French silent film actor.

He starred in some 70 films between 1910 and 1938.

He regularly appeared alongside Gabrielle Robinne.

In 1920 he appeared in Guy du Fresnay's Flipotte.

His brother Jean Signoret (born 1886) was also an actor.

== Selected filmography ==
- Infatuation (1918)
- Roger la Honte (1922)
- The Secret of Polichinelle (1923)
- The Bread Peddler (1923)
- The Two Boys (1924)
- Jocaste (1925)
- Veille d'armes (1935)
- 27 Rue de la Paix (1936)
- The New Men (1936)
- Let's Make a Dream (1936)
- The Great Refrain (1936)
- The Flame (1936)
- Ménilmontant (1936)
- Nuits de feu (1937)
- Arsene Lupin, Detective (1937)
- Culprit (1937)
