= A Love Story (1933 film) =

1933 film

- Directed by: Max Ophüls
- Written by: André Doderet; Arthur Schnitzler (play)
- Produced by: Fred Lissa
- Starring: Abel Tarride; Magda Schneider; Simone Héliard
- Cinematography: Theodore J. Pahle
- Edited by: Paul Salten
- Production company: Alma-Sepic
- Distributed by: Compagnie Française Cinématographique
- Release date: 10 March 1933
- Running time: 82 minutes
- Country: France
- Language: French

A Love Story (French: Une histoire d'amour) is a 1933 French historical drama film directed by Max Ophüls and starring Abel Tarride, Magda Schneider and Simone Héliard, based on Arthur Schnitzler's 1896 play Liebelei about a musician's daughter in 1890s Imperial Vienna who falls in love with a young army officer, only for him to be killed in a duel.

It is a French-language version of Liebelei with several of the same actors. It was made at the Joinville Studios in Paris.

== Cast ==
- Abel Tarride as Le vieux Weyring, musicien
- Magda Schneider as Christine Weyring
- Simone Héliard as Mizzi Schlager
- Gustaf Gründgens as Baron von Eggersdorf
- Olga Chekhova as Baronin von Eggersdorf
- George Rigaud as Lieutenant Théodore Berg
- Wolfgang Liebeneiner as Sous-lieutenant Fritz Lobheimer
- Georges Mauloy as Colonel
- Paul Otto as Major von Eggersdorf
- Pierre Stéphen as Binder, musicien
- André Dubosc as Le concierge du théâtre

== Bibliography ==
- Alpi, Deborah Lazaroff. Robert Siodmak: A Biography, with Critical Analyses of His Films Noirs and a Filmography of All His Works. McFarland, 1998.
- White, Susan M. The Cinema of Max Ophuls: Magisterial Vision and the Figure of Woman. Columbia University Press, 1995.
