= Ménilmontant (1936 film) =

- Directed by: René Guissart
- Written by: Roger Devigne (novel); Yves Mirande
- Starring: Gabriel Signoret; Pierre Larquey; Josette Day
- Cinematography: Marius Raichi; Charles Van Enger
- Edited by: Maurice Serein
- Music by: Armand Bernard
- Production companies: Paris Ciné Films; Compagnie Commerciale Française Cinématographique
- Release date: 20 November 1936
- Running time: 89 minutes
- Country: France
- Language: French

Ménilmontant is a 1936 French comedy drama film directed by René Guissart and starring Gabriel Signoret, Pierre Larquey and Josette Day. It takes its name from the Ménilmontant area of Paris.

== Cast ==
- Gabriel Signoret as Le père Chinelle
- Pierre Larquey as Le père Jos
- Josette Day as Julie
- Thérèse Dorny as Toinon
- Valentine Tessier as Madame Collinet
- Bernard Lancret as Roland
- Georges Bever as Le père Martin
- Armand Lurville as Ganduron
- Robert Seller as Hardel
- André Rehan as Le domestique
- Lise Hestia as La concierge
- Lona Dilva as La chanteuse des rues
- Marcel Mouloudji as Toto
- Jean-Pierre Thisse as Le petit chanteur
- Jacques Chevalier as Lulu
- Roger Doucet as Le joueur d'accordéon
- Paulette Élambert as Riquette
- Jacotte Muller as Zette
- Ginette Nassula as Nini

== Bibliography ==
- Dayna Oscherwitz & MaryEllen Higgins. The A to Z of French Cinema. Scarecrow Press, 2009.
