= The Yellow Dog (1932 film) =

1932 film

The Yellow Dog (French:Le Chien jaune) is a 1932 French crime film directed by Jean Tarride and starring Abel Tarride, Rosine Deréan and Rolla Norman. It is an adaptation of the novel Maigret and the Yellow Dog by the Belgian writer Georges Simenon. Abel Tarride was the director's father.

== Cast ==
- Abel Tarride : Commissaire Maigret
- Rosine Deréan : Emma
- Rolla Norman : Léon
- Robert Le Vigan : Le docteur Ernest Michoux
- Jacques Henley : Le Pommeret
- Anthony Gildès : Le pharmacien
- Robert Lepers : L'inspecteur
- Jean Gobet : Le voyageur de commerce
- Paul Azaïs : Le marin
- Paul Clerget : Le maire
- Fred Marche : Servières
- Jeanne Lory : L'hôtelière

== Bibliography ==
- Alder, Bill (2012). Maigret, Simenon and France: Social Dimensions of the Novels and Stories. McFarland. ISBN 9780786470549.
- Ousby, Ian (1997). Guilty Parties: A Mystery Lover's Companion. Thames & Hudson. ISBN 0-500-27978-0.
- Spicer, Andrew (2007). European Film Noir. Manchester University Press. ISBN 978-0719067907.
