= Judicial Error =

1948 film

- French film poster
- French: Erreur judiciaire
- Directed by: Maurice de Canonge
- Written by: Gérard Carlier; Simon Gantillon; Herbert Victor
- Starring: Michèle Alfa; Jimmy Gaillard; Lucienne Le Marchand
- Cinematography: Georges Million
- Edited by: Monique Bonnot
- Music by: Jacques Dupont
- Production company: Tamara Films
- Distributed by: Les Films Constellation
- Release date: 7 April 1948
- Running time: 80 minutes
- Country: France
- Language: French

Judicial Error (French: Erreur judiciaire) is a 1948 French drama film directed by Maurice de Canonge and starring Michèle Alfa, Jimmy Gaillard and Lucienne Le Marchand. The film's sets were designed by the art director Raymond Gabutti.

== Synopsis ==
After a banker is driven to suicide by his wife's reckless spending, an innocent cashier is wrongly implicated in the crime.

== Cast ==
- Michèle Alfa as Janine Heurteaux
- Jimmy Gaillard as Bob Richard
- Lucienne Le Marchand as Suzanne Gauthier-Duvergne
- Jean Davy as Me Lenoir
- Marcel Dalio as Dinari
- Robert le Béal as Gauthier-Duvergne
- Nicolas Amato as the money changer
- Yves Brainville as Jacques Heurteaux
- Jean-Jacques Delbo as Stefano
- Agnès Laury as "Hen"
- Robert Seller as Monsieur de Berville
- Jacques Berlioz as the prosecutor
- Géno Ferny as Joseph
- Jacques Henley as American
- Gaston Dupray as manager of the café
- Jérôme Goulven as the Commissioner
- Pierre Magnier as the President of the tribunal
- Jacques Mattler as the Advocate General
