= The Spirit of Sidi-Brahim =

1939 film

- Directed by: Marc Didier
- Written by: Yves Mirande
- Produced by: René Bianco
- Starring: René Dary; Colette Darfeuil; Abel Jacquin
- Cinematography: René Gaveau; Marcel Grignon
- Edited by: Henriette Wurtzer
- Music by: Jane Bos
- Production company: Les Films Azur
- Distributed by: Radio Cinéma
- Release dates: 8 December 1939; 2 May 1945 (Paris)
- Running time: 90 minutes
- Country: France
- Language: French

The Spirit of Sidi-Brahim (French: L'esprit de Sidi-Brahim) is a 1939 French spy drama film directed by Marc Didier and starring René Dary, Colette Darfeuil and Abel Jacquin. It was shot at the Cité Elgé Studios in Paris and on location around Savoy. The film's sets were designed by the art director Aimé Bazin. It premiered in Nice in December 1939 but wasn't given a Paris premiere and nationwide release until 1945 following the Liberation and is often dated by that year. The title is a reference to the 1845 Battle of Sidi Brahim in which the French light infantry distinguished themselves. It is also known by the alternative titles Sidi-Brahim or Les diables bleus.

== Synopsis ==
An officer of the Chasseurs Alpins commanding a fort in the French Alps close to its border, assists a young woman who has been stopped by an avalanche and offers her shelter. He falls in love with her, but she is an enemy agent tasked with stealing a vital document. Having tricked him and made off with the secret, he is accused of treason and faces a court martial and firing squad.

== Cast ==
- René Dary as Jean Varin
- Colette Darfeuil as Jane Simon
- Abel Jacquin as Le commandant
- Raymond Aimos as l'adjudant Brochard
- Camille Bert
- Henri Bosc
- Robert Didry
- Philippe Janvier
- Jean Marconi
- Yvonne Rozille

== Bibliography ==
- Bessy, Maurice & Chirat, Raymond. Histoire du cinéma français: 1935-1939. Pygmalion, 1986.
- Crisp, Colin. Genre, Myth and Convention in the French Cinema, 1929-1939. Indiana University Press, 2002.
- Rège, Philippe. Encyclopedia of French Film Directors, Volume 1. Scarecrow Press, 2009.
