= Georges Milton =

French actor and singer

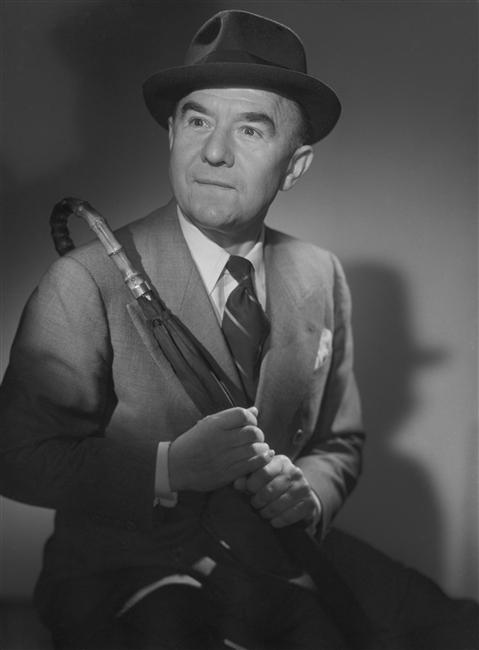
- Milton in 1944.
- Born: 20 September 1886; Puteaux, Hauts-de-Seine, France
- Died: 17 October 1970 (aged 84); Antibes, Alpes-Maritimes, France
- Occupations: Actor, singer
- Years active: 1923–1948 (film)

Georges Milton (20 September 1886 – 17 October 1970) was a French comedian and singer. He was one of the most popular actors at the French cinema box office during the 1930s. He was known for his creation and performance of the comic character Bouboule.

== Selected filmography ==
- L'affaire de la rue de Lourcine (1923)
- Le Roi des resquilleurs (1930)
- Le roi du cirage (1931)
- La bande à Bouboule (1931)
- Kiss Me (1932)
- Count Obligado (1935)
- The Two Schemers (1938)
- Prince Bouboule (1939)
- Et dix de der (1948)

== Bibliography ==
- Andrew, Dudley. Mists of Regret: Culture and Sensibility in Classic French Film. Princeton University Press, 1995.
- Oscherwitz, Dayna & Higgins, MaryEllen. The A to Z of French Cinema. Scarecrow Press, 2009.
