= Le Diable à Paris =

Le Diable à Paris is an operetta by Marcel Lattès to a libretto by Robert de Flers, Francis de Croisset and Albert Willemetz. It premiered at the Théâtre Marigny, Paris, on 27 October 1927.

The plot turns on the grant of wealth to a young lover and youth to an old man, both spurned in love in exchange for the devil's stay in Paris.

== Recording ==
- Marcel Lattès: Le Diable à Paris, David Plantier, Les Plaisirs du Parnasse, 2021 LBM033 B Records
