= Entente cordiale (film) =

- Directed by: Marcel L'Herbier
- Written by: André Maurois (book)
- Produced by: Max Glass; Bernard Natan
- Starring: Gaby Morlay; Victor Francen; Pierre Richard-Willm
- Cinematography: Marc Fossard; Theodore J. Pahle
- Edited by: Raymond Leboursier
- Music by: Roger Bernstein; Marcel Lattès
- Distributed by: Comptoir Français du Film (CFF)
- Release date: 3 April 1939
- Running time: 110 minutes
- Country: France
- Language: French

Entente cordiale is a 1939 French drama film directed by Marcel L'Herbier and starring Gaby Morlay, Victor Francen and Pierre Richard-Willm. The film depicts events between the Fashoda crisis in 1898 and the 1904 signing of the Entente Cordiale creating an alliance between Britain and France and ending their historic rivalry. It was based on the book King Edward VII and His Times by André Maurois. It was made with an eye to its propaganda value, following the Munich Agreement of September 1938 and in anticipation of the outbreak of a Second World War which would test the bonds between Britain and France in a conflict with Nazi Germany.

== Cast ==
- Gaby Morlay ... La reine Victoria
- Victor Francen ... Édouard VII
- Pierre Richard-Willm ... Capitaine Charles Roussel
- André Lefaur ... Lord Clayton
- Arlette Marchal ... La reine Alexandra
- Junie Astor ... Une actrice / An actress
- Nita Raya ... Music Hall Star
- Dorville ... Le cocher / Coachman
- Carine Nelson ... Marjorie, une dame d'honneur
- Jean Périer ... Président Loubet
- Marcelle Praince ... Lady Clayton
- Jacques Baumer ... Clémenceau
- Jacques Grétillat ... Député Roussel
- Bernard Lancret ... Jean Roussel
- Janine Darcey ... Sylvia Clayton
- Jean Worms ... Théophile Delcassé
- Jaque Catelain ... Le prince consort
- Jean Toulout ... Lord Salisbury
- André Roanne ... Arthur Balfour
- Jean d'Yd ... Joë Chamberlain
- Louis Seigner ... L'ambassadeur d'Allemagne
- Robert Pizani ... Paul Cambon
- Aimé Clariond ... L'ambassadeur de Russie
- Abel Tarride ... La maître d'hôtel
- Sinoël ... Le concierge
- Pierre Labry ... Un journaliste / A journalist
- Jean Galland ... Général Kitchener
- Liliane Lesaffre ... La fille du concierge
- Suzanne Devoyod ... Une dame d'honneur
- Ginette Gaubert ... Jeanne Granier
- Gabrielle Fontan ... Une dame de la Cour
- Génia Vaury ... Mme de Lormes
- Christiane Ribes ... Mme de Vaumoise

== Production ==
Entente Cordiale was the third in Marcel L'Herbier's series of "Chroniques filmées" (following La Tragédie impériale and Adrienne Lecouvreur, both in 1938) in which he dramatised historical subjects in a manner "very close to reality", albeit reluctantly combined with some romantic fiction.

Filming took place at the Studios de Saint-Maurice (south-east of Paris) in January & February 1939, and it was ready for its gala première in April before representatives of the French and British governments.
