= Jacqueline Daix =

French actress

- Born: 1914; France
- Died: 1982 (aged 67–68); France
- Occupation: Actress
- Years active: 1933-1939 (film)

Jacqueline Daix (1914–1982) was a French film actress.

== Selected filmography ==
- The Man with a Broken Ear (1934)
- A Day Will Come (1934)
- Merchant of Love (1935)
- The Pont-Biquet Family (1935)
- Three Days Leave (1936)
- The Drunkard (1937)
- Boulot the Aviator (1937)
- The Corsican Brothers (1939)

== Bibliography ==
- Goble, Alan. The Complete Index to Literary Sources in Film. Walter de Gruyter, 1999.
