= Abel Tarride =

French actor

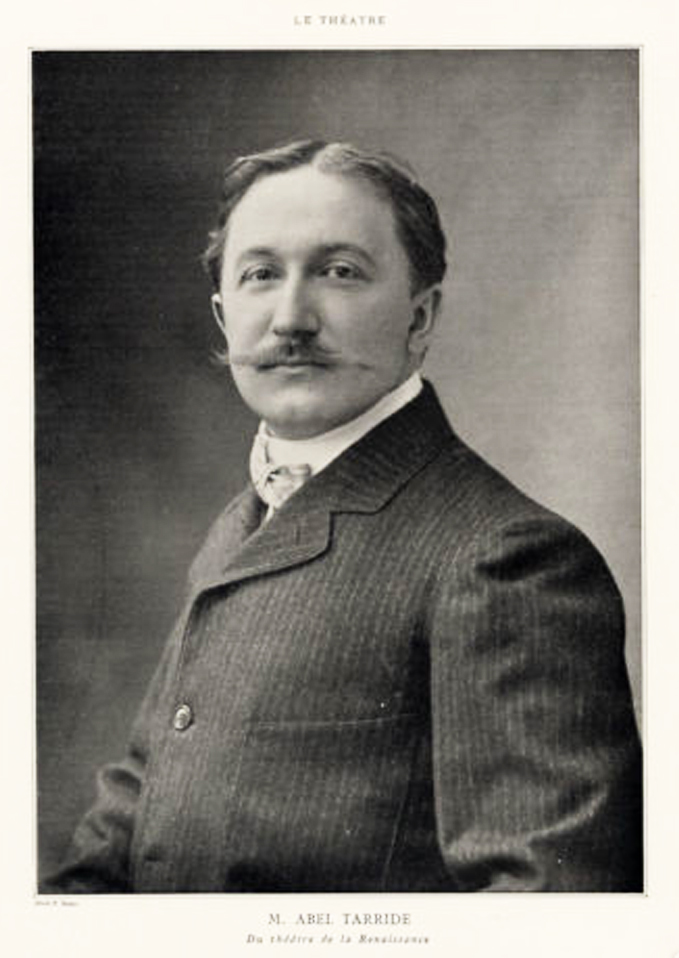
Abel Tarride photographed in 1902

Abel Tarride (1865–1951) was a French actor. He was the father of the actor Jacques Tarride and the director Jean Tarride. He played the role of Jules Maigret in the 1932 film The Yellow Dog, directed by his son.

== Selected filmography ==
- Jocaste (1925)
- To Live Happily (1932)
- The Yellow Dog (1932)
- Kiss Me (1932)
- A Love Story (1933)
- Number 33 (1933)
- Broken Wings (1933)
- Aux portes de Paris (1934)
- The Adventurer (1934)
- The Queen and the Cardinal (1935)
- Nitchevo (1936)
- Maria of the Night (1936)
- The Two Girls (1936)
- The Silent Battle (1937)
- The Green Jacket (1937)
- Blanchette (1937)
- Entente cordiale (1939)
- Night Warning (1946)
