= Solange Podell =

Solange Podell born Claude Solange Demarcq (1 June 1927 - 3 March 2020), was a French photographer. She worked as a dancer, singer, and actress before transitioning to photography.

After working for many years in New York, she settled in Monaco. There, she served as the Principality's official photographer.
