= Pierre Brasseur =

French actor (1905–1972)

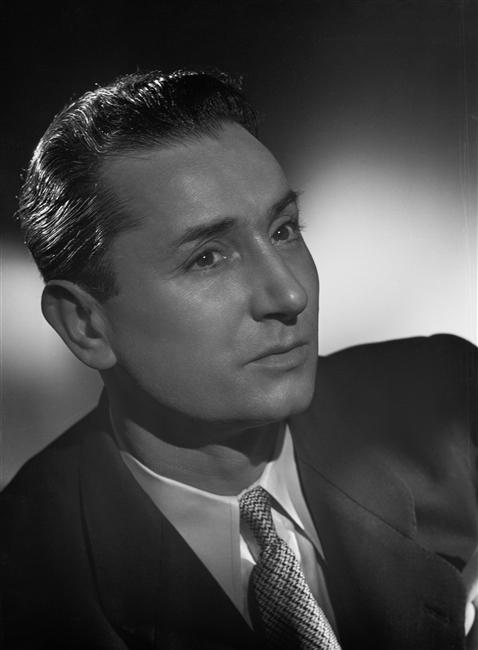
- Brasseur in 1943
- Born: Pierre-Albert Espinasse; 22 December 1905; Paris, France
- Died: 16 August 1972 (aged 66); Bruneck, South Tyrol, Italy
- Resting place: Père-Lachaise Cemetery, Paris, France
- Occupation: Actor
- Years active: 1924–1972
- Spouse(s): Odette Joyeux (1935–1945); Lina Magrini (1947–1961)
- Children: Claude Brasseur

Pierre Brasseur (French pronunciation: [pjɛʁ bʁasœʁ]; 22 December 1905 – 16 August 1972), born Pierre-Albert Espinasse, was a French actor.

== Biography ==
The son of actors Georges Espinasse and Germaine Brasseur was an actor as well. The family tradition of using the name Brasseur was continued by his son Claude and his grandson Alexandre.

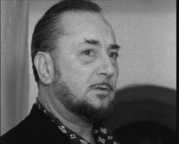
Pierre Brasseur in 1961 in the film Mon frère Jacques

Renowned for playing outsized characters, Brasseur is best remembered for his (semi-fictionalised) portrayal of the actor Frédérick Lemaître in Les Enfants du Paradis (Children of Paradise, 1945) and as Docteur Génessier (more subdued) in the horror film Les Yeux sans visage (Eyes Without a Face, 1960) co-starring Alida Valli. On 30 May 1927, he performed the spoken role of the Narrator in the world premiere of Igor Stravinsky's opera-oratorio Oedipus Rex.

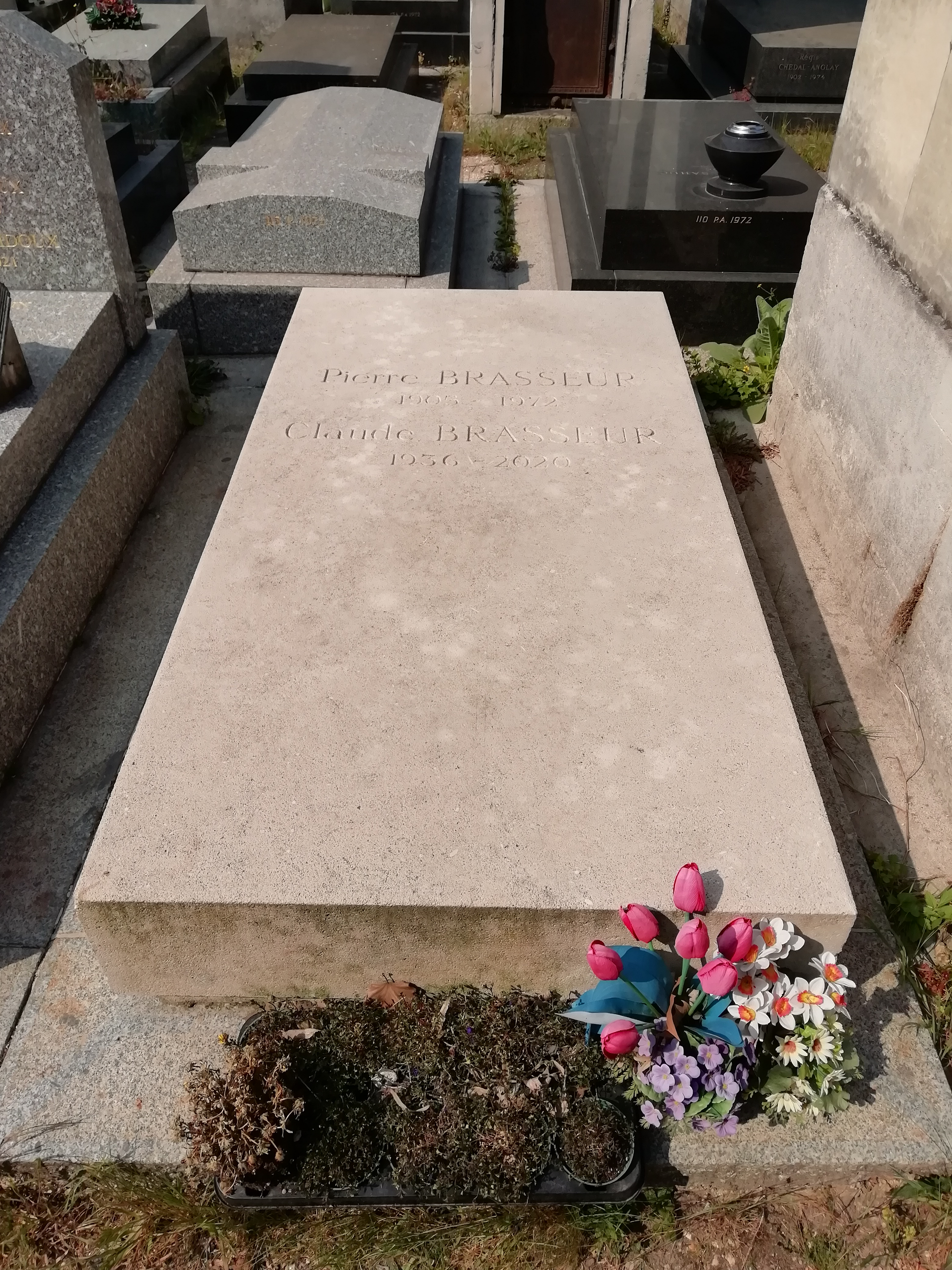
Brasseur’s grave at Pere Lachaise Cemetery

== Honours ==
Brasseur was made Chevalier (Knight) of the Légion d'honneur in 1966. The following year, he was made Commandeur (Commander) of the Ordre des Arts et des Lettres in 1967.

== Selected filmography ==
- A Father Without Knowing It (1932)
- Honeymoon Trip (1933)
- One Night's Song (1933)
- The Weaker Sex (1933)
- The Uncle from Peking (1934)
- A Rare Bird (1935)
- The Decoy (1935)
- Little One (1935)
- The Squadron's Baby (1935)
- Claudine at School (1937)
- Giuseppe Verdi (1938)
- Hercule (1938)
- Port of Shadows (Le Quai des brumes, 1938)
- The Path of Honour (1939)
- The Corsican Brothers (1939)
- Tobias Is an Angel (1940)
- Three Argentines in Montmartre (1941)
- The Crossroads (1942)
- Promise to a Stranger (1942)
- Summer Light (1943)
- Goodbye Leonard (1943)
- Children of Paradise (1945)
- Gates of the Night (1946)
- Pétrus (1946)
- Jericho (1946)
- Love Around the House (1947)
- Rocambole (1948)
- Cruise for the Unknown One (1948)
- The Secret of Monte Cristo (1948)
- The White Night (1948)
- Millionaires for One Day (1949)
- The Lovers Of Verona (1949)
- The Man from Jamaica (1950)
- Julie de Carneilhan (1950)
- Skipper Next to God (1951)
- Dirty Hands (1951)
- Le Plaisir (1952)
- Crimson Curtain (1952)
- The King and the Mockingbird (1952, voice)
- Rasputin (1954)
- Oasis (1955)
- Tower of Lust (1955)
- Napoléon (1955)
- Gates of Paris (1957)
- Life Together (1958)
- Les Grandes Familles (1958)
- The Law (1959)
- Head Against the Wall (1959)
- Eyes Without a Face (1960)
- Carthage in Flames (1960)
- Il bell'Antonio (1960)
- Candide ou l'optimisme au XXe siècle (1960)
- Spotlight on a Murderer (1961)
- The Nina B. Affair (1961)
- Emile's Boat (1962)
- Girl on the Road (1962)
- Lucky Jo (1964)
- Le Grain de sable (1964)
- Un monde nouveau (1965)
- The Duke's Gold (1965)
- A Matter of Resistance (1966)
- King of Hearts (1966)
- Fortuna (1966)
- Birds in Peru (1968)
- Sous le signe de Monte-Cristo (1968)
- A Little Virtuous (1968)
- Macédoine (1971)
- The Married Couple of the Year Two (1971)
