= René Mercier =

French composer and conductor

René Mercier (end of the 19th century – 1 January 1973) was a 20th-century French composer and conductor.

== Biography ==
Little is known about the life of René Mercier. Even his birth date is unknown. Composer of second rank, he is best known as a conductor. He never got very big personal success, apart from a few songs: : Elle s'était fait couper les cheveux, in reference to the flappers of the 1920s. His patriotic song Verdun ! On ne passe pas, written during the war (1916) remains one of his great success, due to the circumstances.

His operetta composer's career is uneven. J'te veux stayed 260 days in theaters. His biggest theatrical success is Déshabillez-vous (168 représentations). The following year, Bégonia was also successful, thanks to the presence of Dranem.

He participated as a composer in several films of the 30s.

After World War II, he was conductor in various music halls, including the ABC from 1948 to 1955. At the Théâtre des Capucines, he composed the 1945 review with Raoul Moretti. He directed the presentations of La Quincaillère de Chicago by Louiguy in 1948, and La Route fleurie by Francis Lopez in 1953 (1500 presentations).

== Main works ==
Vocal music

- 1922 : Les Fifilles de Loth
- 1923 : Benjamin
- 1923 : J'te veux
- 1925 : Le Pêché capiteux
- 1928 : Déshabillez-vous !
- 1930 : Bégonia
- 1934 : Elles font toutes l'amour
- 1935 : La Reine de la Sierra
- 1936 : Un p'tit bout d'femme
- 1937 : Échalote et ses amants

Songs

- 1916: Verdun ! On ne passe pas, lyrics by Eugène Joullot and Jack Cazol
- 1925: Elle s'était fait couper les cheveux, lyrics by Vincent Telly, sung by Alexandre Dréan
- 1931: Adieu vieille Europe, lyrics by Simon Deylon
- 1932: Totor t'as tort

== Filmography ==
- 1931: The Man at Midnight by Harry Lachman
- 1932: Sergeant X by Vladimir Strizhevsky
- 1932: Kiss Me by Léon Mathot (with Vincent Scotto)
- 1934: C'était un musicien by Maurice Gleize and Friedrich Zelnik
- 1936: La Mariée du régiment by Maurice Cammage
