= Théâtre des Folies-Wagram =

Former theatre in Paris

Coordinates: 48.877°N 2.297°E

Théâtre des Folies-Wagram logo as it appeared from 1929–1931

The Théâtre des Folies-Wagram was a theatre in Paris which operated from 1928 until 1964. From late 1935 it was known as the Théâtre de l'Étoile. Located at 35 Avenue de Wagram in the 17th arrondissement, the theatre saw the premieres of numerous French operettas as well as Antonin Artaud's play Les Cenci. It had no connection to another theatre also known as the Théâtre de l'Étoile which was located on the Champs-Élysées and operated from 1923 to 1926.

== History ==
The theatre was built on the initiative of Paul Fournier and the Lutetia-Empire company which already owned a number of cinemas in Paris as well as two large music halls, the Théâtre de l'Empire on Avenue Wagram and the Bobino on Rue de la Gaîté. The architect of the new theatre was Paul Farge who had also designed the renovation of the Empire. The theatre's interior had a pink and silver colour scheme and had a seating capacity of 1500. A smoking foyer and an American bar were located on the first floor.

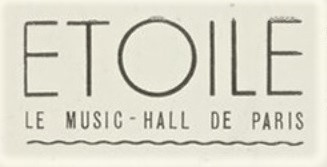
Théâtre de l'Étoile logo in 1945

On 14 March 1928 the Folies-Wagram was inaugurated with a gala revue featuring Marie Dubas, Henri Garat, and the comedian Cariel. Later that year, the theatre staged the French premiere of Oscar Straus's operetta Teresina. It would be the first of many operettas to premiere there. Prior to World War II, the Folies-Wagram staged primarily operettas and revues. The rare exception was the world premiere on 6 May 1935 of Antonin Artaud's play Les Cenci, a violent tale of incest, murder and betrayal. After its summer closure in 1935, the theatre reopened in the autumn as the Théâtre de l'Étoile and continued its repertoire of operettas and revues.

In the post-World War II years the Étoile also saw many shows by individual singers. Edith Piaf appeared in 1945, accompanied on the piano by her protégé Robert Chauvigny for the first time. Yves Montand had earlier appeared in a show with Piaf and in 1951 returned in a one-man show, accompanied by jazz guitarist Henri Crolla and the Bob Castella Orchestra. That same year Charles Trenet made his French come-back with a show at the Étoile after spending several years in the United States. Marlene Dietrich's show opened in 1959 with an audience that included Jean Cocteau and Maurice Chevalier.

Increasing financial difficulties led to the theatre's permanent closure at the beginning of 1964. It was later demolished and replaced by an office and commercial building.

== Operetta premieres ==
Operettas premiered at the Théâtre des Folies-Wagram include:

- Teresina by Oscar Straus, 25 May 1928 (premiere of French version)
- L'Orloff by Bruno Granichstaedten, 8 December 1928 (French premiere)
- Tip-Toes by George Gershwin, 26 April 1929 (French premiere)
- Rosy by Raoul Moretti, 24 February 1930 (world premiere)
- Zou! by Josef Szulc, 2 May 1930 (world premiere)
- Brummell by Reynaldo Hahn, 17 January 1931 (world premiere)
