= The Beautiful Adventure =

The Beautiful Adventure may refer to:

- The Beautiful Adventure (originally "La belle aventure"), a 1914 play by Gaston Arman de Caillavet, Robert de Flers and Étienne Rey
  - The Beautiful Adventure (1917 film), an American silent film, based on the play
  - The Beautiful Adventure (1932 German-language film), a film directed by Reinhold Schünzel, based on the play
  - The Beautiful Adventure (1932 French-language film), a French-language remake, based on the play
  - The Beautiful Adventure (1942 film), a French film, based on the play
- The Beautiful Adventure (1959 film), a West German film
