= Adventure (1936 film) =

1936 film

- Directed by: Per-Axel Branner
- Written by: Carlo Keil-Möller
- Based on: The Beautiful Adventure; 1917 play by Gaston Arman de Caillavet; Robert de Flers; Étienne Rey
- Starring: Karin Swanström; Tutta Rolf; Olof Winnerstrand
- Cinematography: Julius Jaenzon
- Edited by: Oscar Rosander
- Music by: Jules Sylvain
- Production company: Alliansfilm
- Distributed by: Svensk Talfilm
- Release date: 5 October 1936
- Running time: 83 minutes
- Country: Sweden
- Language: Swedish

Adventure (Swedish: Äventyret) is a 1936 Swedish drama film directed by Per-Axel Branner and starring Karin Swanström, Tutta Rolf and Olof Winnerstrand. It was shot at the Råsunda Studios in Stockholm and on location in Täby. The film's sets were designed by the art director Arne Åkermark. It is based on 1913 play The Beautiful Adventure by Gaston Arman de Caillavet, Robert de Flers and Étienne Rey, adapted several times into films including the later 1942 French production The Beautiful Adventure.

== Cast ==
- Karin Swanström as von Bohren
- Tutta Rolf as Heléne von Bohren
- Olof Winnerstrand as Count Knut Lagercrona
- Elsa Carlsson as Countess Lagercrona
- Håkan Westergren as Karl Henrik Lagercrona
- Sture Lagerwall as Sebastian Lavenius
- Frida Winnerstrand as von Ackerman
- Irma Christenson as Daisy
- Elsa Ebbesen as Tilda
- Hjördis Petterson as Four times married wife
- Astrid Bodin as Lagercronas husa
- Carl Browallius as Läkaren
- Bellan Roos as Änkefru von Borens husa
- Carl Ström as Lönnvall, generaldirektör
- Märta Dorff as Karl Henriks sekreterare
- George Fant as Ung man
- Olav Riégo as Prästen
- Jullan Jonsson as Fröken Berg
- Ernst Fastbom as Bröllopsgäst
- Knut Frankman as Tågkonduktör
- Sven-Eric Gamble as Pojke
- Anna-Stina Wåglund as Helenes sömmerska

== Bibliography ==
- Krawc, Alfred. International Directory of Cinematographers, Set- and Costume Designers in Film: Denmark, Finland, Norway, Sweden (from the beginnings to 1984). Saur, 1986.
- Qvist, Per Olov & von Bagh, Peter. Guide to the Cinema of Sweden and Finland. Greenwood Publishing Group, 2000.
