= Miquette =

Miquette may refer to:

- Miquette et sa mere, a 1906 play by Robert de Flers et Gaston Arman de Caillavet
- Miquette (1934 film), a 1934 French comedy film
- Miquette (1940 film), a French film directed by Jean Boyer
- Miquette (1950 film), a French film directed by Henri-Georges Clouzot
- Miquette Giraudy (born 1953), French musician
