= Gaston Arman de Caillavet =

French playwright

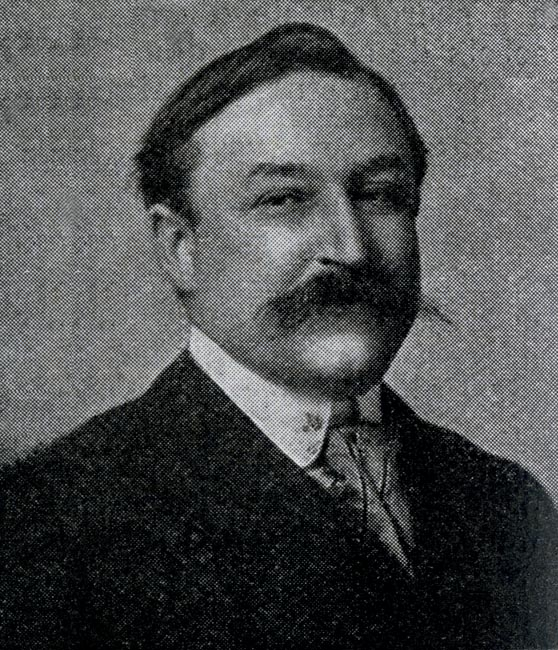
- Photography of Gaston Arman de Caillavet.
- Born: 13 March 1869
- Died: 13 January 1915 (aged 45)
- Occupation: Playwright
- Spouse: Jeanne Pouquet
- Children: 1
- Parent(s): Albert Arman de Caillavet; Léontine Lippmann
- Relatives: André Maurois (son-in-law)

Gaston Arman de Caillavet (French: [ɡastɔ̃ aʁmɑ̃ də kajavɛ]; 13 March 1869 – 13 January 1915) was a French playwright.

== Early life ==
Gaston Arman de Caillavet was born on 13 March 1869. He was the son of Albert Arman de Caillavet and Léontine Lippmann. His maternal grandfather, Auguste Lippmann, was a banker of Jewish descent.

== Career ==
De Caillavet was a playwright. From 1901 to 1915, he collaborated with Robert de Flers on many works, including light and witty operettas or comédies de boulevard, many of which were great successes.

== Personal life ==
In April 1893 he married Jeanne Pouquet. He was a close friend of Marcel Proust who found in him and his fiancée, Jeanne Pouquet, a model of the relationship between Robert de Saint-Loup and Gilberte in his famous novel In Search of Lost Time.

Gaston and Jeanne had only one daughter, Simone, who married (second wedding) André Maurois, future biographer of Proust.

== Works ==
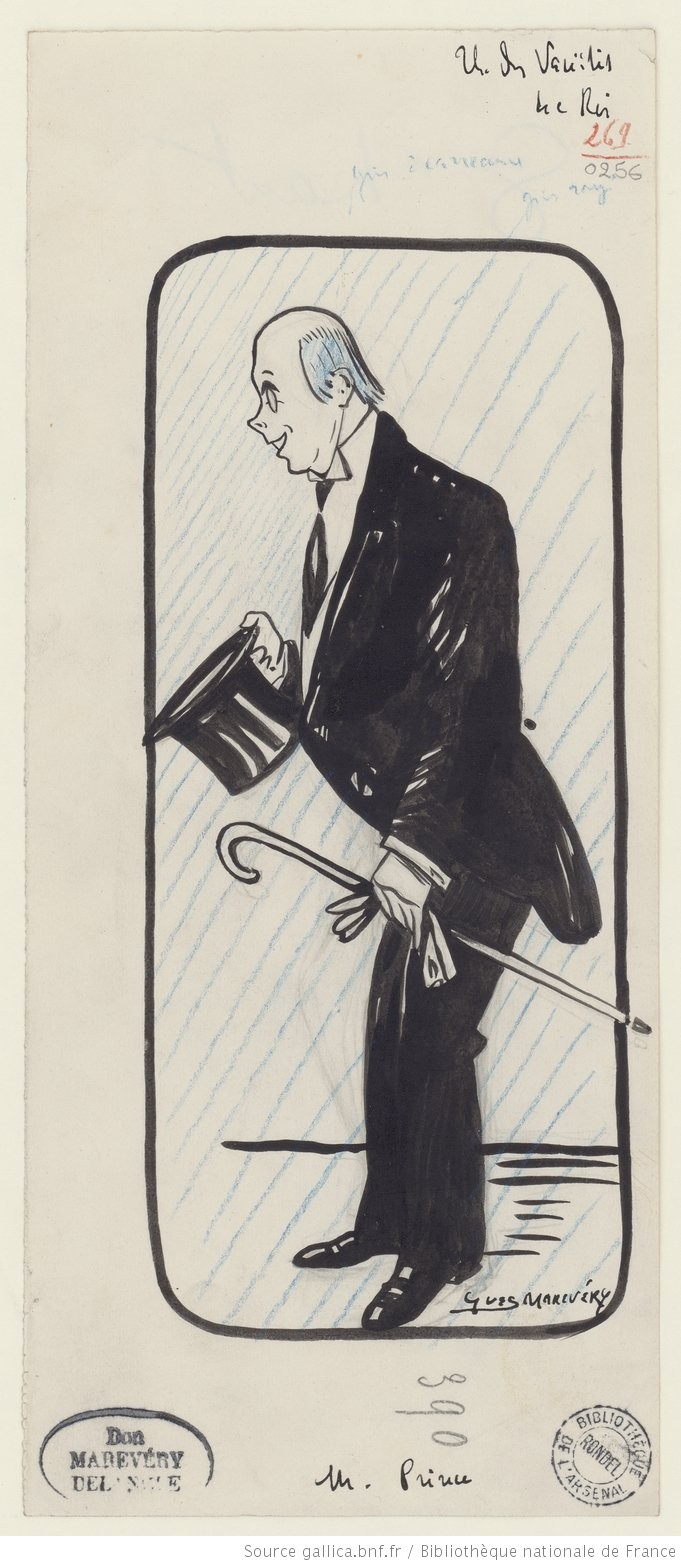
Charles Prince in Le roi (1908) by Gaston Arman de Caillavet, Robert de Flers and Emmanuel Arène, drawing by Yves Marevéry

- Les travaux d'Hercule, opéra bouffe in three acts, with Robert de Flers, music by Claude Terrasse, 1901
- Le Cœur a ses raisons..., comedy in one act, with Robert de Flers, premiered in Paris at the Théâtre de la Renaissance on 13 May 1902
- Le Sire de Vergy, opéra bouffe in three acts, with Robert de Flers, music by Claude Terrasse, premiered in Paris at the Théâtre des Variétés on 15 April 1903
- Les Sentiers de la vertu, comedy in three acts, with Robert de Flers, premiered in Paris at the Théâtre des Nouveautés on 7 December 1903
- La Montansier, historic comedy in 4 acts and a prologue, with Robert de Flers and Henry Ibels, premiered in Paris at the Théâtre de la Gaîté on 24 March 1904
- Monsieur de La Palisse, opéra-bouffe in three acts, with Robert de Flers, music by Claude Terrasse, premiered in Paris at the Théâtre des Variétés on 2 November 1904
- L'ange du foyer, comedy in three acts, with Robert de Flers, premiered in Paris at the Théâtre des Nouveautés on 19 March 1905
- La Chance du mari, comedy in one act, with Robert de Flers, premiered in Paris at the Théâtre du Gymnase on 16 May 1906
- Miquette et sa mère, comedy in three acts, with Robert de Flers, premiered in Paris at the Théâtre des Variétés on 2 November 1906
- Fortunio, opera in four acts and five tableaux, after Le Chandelier by Alfred de Musset, with Robert de Flers, music by André Messager, premiered in Paris at the Opéra-Comique on 5 June 1907
- L'Amour veille, comedy in four acts, with Robert de Flers, premiered in Paris at the Comédie-Française on 1 October 1907
- L'éventail, comedy in four acts, with Robert de Flers, premiered in Paris at the Théâtre du Gymnase on 29 October 1907
- Le Roi, comedy in four acts, with Robert de Flers and Emmanuel Arène, premiered in Paris at the Théâtre des Variétés on 24 April 1908
- L'âne de Buridan, comedy in three acts, with Robert de Flers, premiered in Paris at the Théâtre du Gymnase on 19 February 1909
- Le Bois sacré, comedy in three acts, with Robert de Flers, premiered in Paris at the Théâtre des Variétés on 22 March 1910
- La Vendetta, opera in three acts, with Robert de Flers, after a novel by Loriot-Lecaudey, music by Jean Nouguès, premiered at the Opéra de Marseille on 27 January 1911
- Papa, comedy in three acts, with Robert de Flers, premiered in Paris at the Théâtre du Gymnase on 11 February 1911
- Primerose, comedy in three acts, with Robert de Flers, premiered in Paris at the Comédie-Française on 9 October 1911
- L'Habit vert, comedy in four acts, with Robert de Flers, premiered in Paris at the Théâtre des Variétés on 16 November 1912
- La belle aventure, comedy in three acts, with Robert de Flers and Étienne Rey, premiered in Paris at the Théâtre du Vaudeville on 23 December 1913
- Béatrice, opera in four acts, with Robert de Flers, after a story by Charles Nodier, music by André Messager, 1914
- Monsieur Brotonneau, play in three acts, with Robert de Flers, premiered in Paris at the Théâtre de la Porte Saint-Martin on 8 April 1914
- Cydalise et le Chèvre-pied, ballet in two acts and three tableaux, with Robert de Flers, music by Gabriel Pierné, 1923
- Le Jardin du paradis, musical story in four acts after Hans Christian Andersen, with Robert de Flers, music by Alfred Bruneau, 1923

== Filmography ==
- Il bosco sacro, directed by Carmine Gallone (Italy, 1915, based on the play Le Bois sacré)
- Hans bröllopsnatt, directed by Mauritz Stiller (Sweden, 1915, based on the play La belle aventure)
- The Beautiful Adventure, directed by Dell Henderson (1917, based on the play La belle aventure)
- L'asino di Buridano, directed by Eleuterio Rodolfi (Italy, 1917, based on the play L'Âne de Buridan)
- Love Watches, directed by Henry Houry (1918, based on the play L'amour veille)
- Primerose, directed by Mario Caserini (Italy, 1919, based on the play Primerose)
- The King on Main Street, directed by Monta Bell (1925, based on the play Le Roi)
- The Beautiful Adventure, directed by Reinhold Schünzel (Germany, 1932, based on the play La belle aventure)
  - The Beautiful Adventure, directed by Reinhold Schünzel and Roger Le Bon (French, 1932, based on the play La belle aventure)
- Buridan's Donkey, directed by Alexandre Ryder (France, 1932, based on the play L'Âne de Buridan)
- Primerose, directed by René Guissart (France, 1934, based on the play Primerose)
- Miquette, directed by Henri Diamant-Berger (France, 1934, based on the play Miquette et sa mère)
- Äventyret, directed by Per-Axel Branner (Sweden, 1936, based on the play La belle aventure)
- The King, directed by Pierre Colombier (France, 1936, based on the play Le Roi)
- L'Ange du foyer, directed by Léon Mathot (France, 1937, based on the play L'Ange du foyer)
- L'amour veille, directed by Henry Roussel (France, 1937, based on the play L'amour veille)
- The Green Jacket, directed by Roger Richebé (France, 1937, based on the play L'Habit vert)
- Monsieur Brotonneau, directed by Alexander Esway (France, 1939, based on the play Monsieur Brotonneau)
- Papacito lindo, directed by Fernando de Fuentes (Mexico, 1939, based on the play Miquette et sa mère)
- Sacred Woods, directed by Léon Mathot (France, 1939, based on the play Le Bois sacré)
- Miquette, directed by Jean Boyer (France, 1940, based on the play Miquette et sa mère)
- Dernière Aventure, directed by Robert Péguy (France, 1942, based on the play Papa)
- The Beautiful Adventure, directed by Marc Allégret (France, 1942, based on the play La belle aventure)
- A Royal Affair, directed by Marc-Gilbert Sauvajon (France, 1949, based on the play Le Roi)
- Miquette, directed by Henri-Georges Clouzot (France, 1950, based on the play Miquette et sa mère)
- Bruden fra Dragstrup, directed by Annelise Reenberg (Denmark, 1955, based on the play La belle aventure)
- Ihana seikkailu, directed by Toivo Särkkä (Finland, 1962, based on the play La belle aventure)
