= List of productions directed by André Antoine =

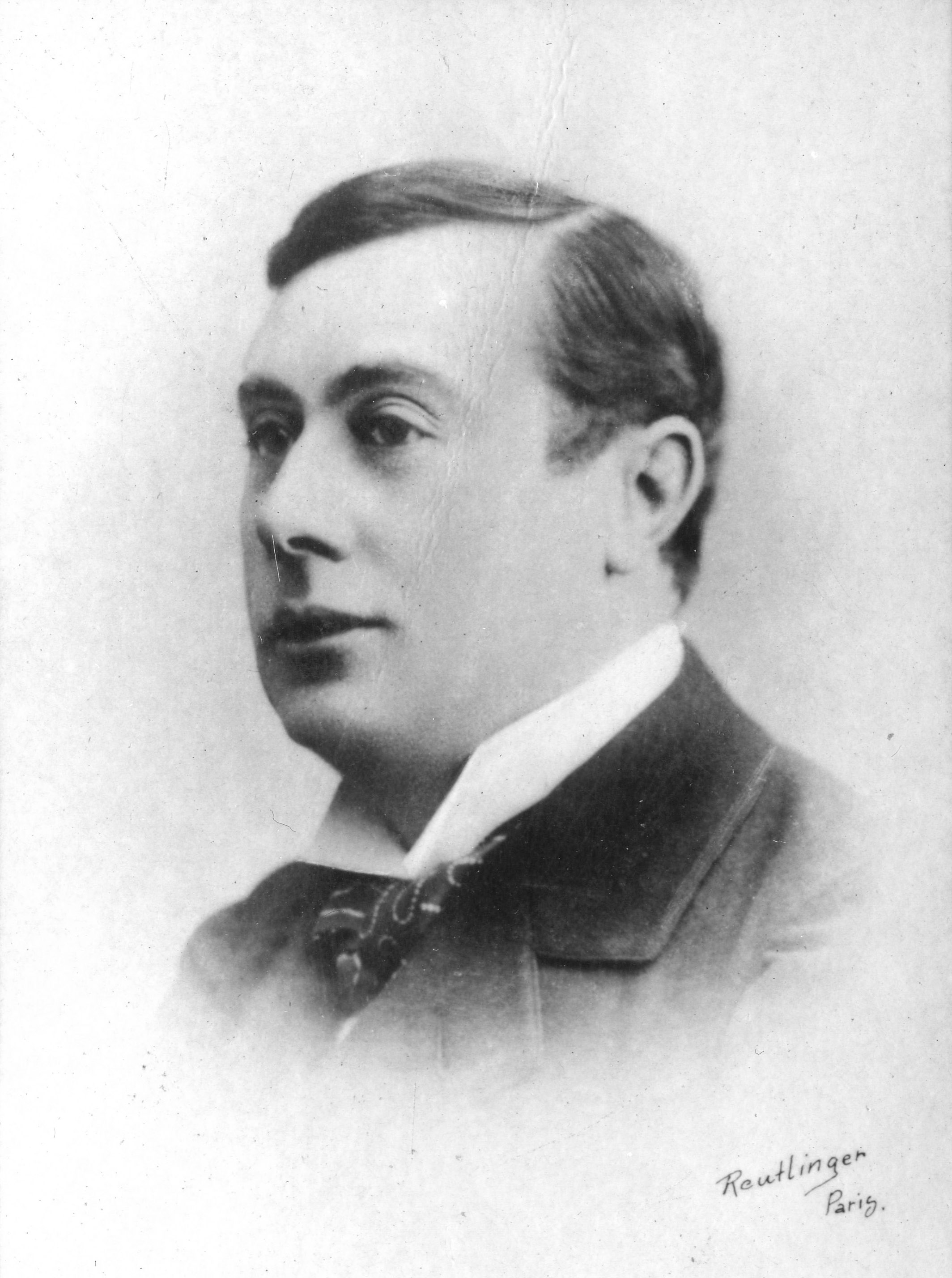
Antoine c. 1900, published in 1908 by Chocolats Félix Potin

This article offers a list of productions directed by André Antoine. It includes only theatre productions that André Antoine directed. Antoine (31 January 1858 – 23 October 1943) was a French actor, theatre manager, film director, author, and critic who is considered the father of modern mise en scène in France.

== Productions ==
=== Passage de l'Élysées des Beaux Arts ===
- 1887: Mademoiselle Pomme (Duranty and Alexis)
- 1887: Un Préfet (Byl)
- 1887: Jacques d'Amour (Hennique, adapted from Zola)
- 1887: La Cocarde (Vidal)
- 1887: La Nuit Bergamesque (Bergerat)
- 1887: En Famille (Métènier)
- 1887: Soeur Philomène (Byl and Vidal)
- 1887: L'Évasion (L'Isle-Adam)

=== Théâtre Montparnasse ===
- 1887: Belle-Petite (Corneau)
- 1887: La Femme de Tabarin (Mendès)
- 1887: Esther Brandès (Hennique)
- 1887: La Sérénade (Jullien)
- 1888: Le Baiser (Banville)
- 1888: Tout pour l'honneur (Céard, adapted from Zola's Captaine Burle)
- 1888: La Puissance des ténèbres (Tolstoy)
- 1888: La Pelote (Bonnetain and Descaves)
- 1888: Pierrot assassin de sa femme (Margueritte)
- 1888: Les Quarts d'heure (Guiches and Lavedan)
- 1888: Le Pain du Péché (Arène)
- 1888: Matapan (Moreau)
- 1888: La Prose (Salandri)
- 1888: Monsieur Lamblin (Ancey)
- 1888: La Fin de Lucie Pellegrin (Alexis)

=== Théâtre des Menus-Plaisirs ===
- 1888: Les Bouchers (Icres)
- 1888: Chevalerie rustique (Verga)
- 1888: L'Amante du Christ (Darzens)
- 1888: Rolande (Gramont)
- 1888: La Chance de Françoise (Porto-Riche)
- 1888: La Mort du duc d'Enghien (Hennique)
- 1888: Le Cor fleuri (Mikhaël)
- 1889: La Reine Fiammette (Mendès)
- 1889: Les Résignés (Céard)
- 1889: L'Echéance (Jullien)
- 1889: La Patrie en Danger (Goncourt)
- 1889: L'Ancien (Cladel)
- 1889: Madeleine (Émile Zola)
- 1889: Les Inséparables (Alcey)
- 1889: Le Comte Witold (Rzewuski)
- 1889: Le Coeur révélateur (Laumann, adapted from Poe)
- 1889: La Casserole (Méténier)
- 1889: Dans le Guignol (Aicard)
- 1889: Le Père Lebonnard (Aicard)
- 1889: Au temps de la ballade (Bois)
- 1889: L'Éole des veufs (Ancey)
- 1890: Le Pain d'autrui (Turgenev)
- 1890: En Détresse (Févre)
- 1890: Les Frères Zemganno (Alexis and Méténier, adapted from Goncourt)
- 1890: Deux tourtereaux (Ginisty and Guérin)
- 1890: Ménages d'artistes (Brieux)
- 1890: Le Maître (Jullien)
- 1890: Jacques Bouchard (Wolff)
- 1890: Une Nouvelle École (Mullem)
- 1890: La Tante Léontine (Boniface and Bodin)
- 1890: Les Revenants (Henrik Ibsen)
- 1890: La Pêche (Céard)
- 1890: Myrane (Bergerat)
- 1890: Les Chapons (Descaves and Darien)
- 1890: L'Honneur (Fèvre)
- 1890: Monsieur Bute (Biollay)
- 1890: L'Amant de sa femme (Scholl)
- 1890: La Belle Opération (Sermet)
- 1890: La Fille Élisa (Ajalbert, adapted from Goncourt)
- 1890: Conte de Noël (Linert)
- 1891: La Meule (Lecomte)
- 1891: Jeune premier (Ginisty)
- 1891: Le Canard sauvage (Henrik Ibsen, translated by Ephraïm and Lindenlaub)
- 1891: Nell Horn (Rosny)
- 1891: Leurs filles (Wolff)
- 1891: Les Fourches caudines (Corbellier)
- 1891: Lidoire (Courteline)
- 1891: Coeurs simples (Sutter-Laumann)
- 1891: Le Pendu (Bourgeois)
- 1891: Dans le rêve (Mullem)
- 1891: Le Père Goriot (Tarabant, adapted from Balzac)
- 1891: La Rançon (Salandri)
- 1891: L'Abbé Pierre (Prévost)
- 1891: Un beau soir (Vaucaire)
- 1891: La Dupe (Ancey)
- 1891: Son petit coeur (Marsolleau)
- 1892: L'Envers d'une sainte (Curel)
- 1892: Seul (Guinon)
- 1892: Simone (Gramont)
- 1892: Les Maris de leurs filles (Wolff)
- 1892: La Fin du vieux temps (Anthelme)
- 1892: Péche d'amour (Carré fils and Loiseau)
- 1892: Les Fenêtres (Perrin and Couturier)
- 1892: Mélie (Docquois, adapted from Reibrach)
- 1892: Le Grappin (Salandri)
- 1892: L'Affranchie (Biollay)
- 1892: Les Fossiles (Curel)
- 1893: Le Ménage Brésile (Coolus)
- 1893: Mademoiselle Julie (August Strindberg)
- 1893: A bas le progrès (Goncourt)
- 1893: Le Devoir (Bruyerre)
- 1893: Mirages (Lecomte)
- 1893: Valet de coeur (Vaucaire)
- 1893: Boubouroche (Courteline)
- 1893: Les Tisserands (Hauptmann)
- 1893: Ahasvère (Heijermans)
- 1893: Blanchette (Brieux), Italian tour.
- 1893: Mariage d'argent (Bourgeois)
- 1893: La Belle au bois rêvant (Mazade)
- 1893: Une Faillite (Björnson)
- 1893: Le Poète et le financier (Vaucaire)
- 1893: L'Inquietude (Perrin and Couturier)
- 1893: Amants éternels (Corneau and Gerbault)
- 1894: L'Assomption de Hannele Mattern (Hauptmann)
- 1894: En l'attendant (Roux)
- 1894: Une Journée parlementaire (Barrès)
- 1894: Le Missionaire (Luguet)

=== Théâtre Libre, Paris ===
- 1895: Elën (Isle-Adam)
- 1895: L'Argent (Fabre)
- 1895: Grand-papa (Berton)
- 1895: Si c'était ... (Lheureux)
- 1895: La Lumée puis la flamme (Caraguel)
- 1895: Le Cuivre (Adam and Picard)
- 1896: L'Ame invisible (Berton)
- 1896: Mademoiselle Fifi (Méténier)
- 1896: Inceste d'âmes (Laurenty and Hauser)
- 1896: Soldat et mineur (Malafayde)
- 1896: La Fille d'Artaban (Mortier)
- 1896: La Nébuleuse (Dumur)
- 1896: Dialogue inconnu (Vigny)

=== Théâtre Antoine, Paris ===
- 1897–1898: Le Repas du Lion (Curel)
- 1897–1898: La Parisienne (Becque)
- 1897–1898: Le Bien d'autrui (Fabré)
- 1897–1898: Dix ans après (Veber)
- 1897–1898: Les Amis (Dreyfus)
- 1897–1898: L'Infidèle (Porte-Riche)
- 1897–1898: La Brebis (Sée)
- 1897–1898: Herakléa (Villeroy)
- 1897–1898: Joseph d'Arimathée (Travieux)
- 1897–1898: Hors des lois (Marsolleau and Byl)
- 1897–1898: Le Petit Lord (Lemaire and Bournet)
- 1897–1898: Le Fardeau de la liberté (Bernard)
- 1897–1898: L'Epidémie (Mirbeau)
- 1897–1898: Son petit coeur (Marsolleau)
- 1897–1898: Le Retour de l'aigle (Labruyere)
- 1897–1898: Le Départ (Becque)
- 1898–1899: La Nouvelle Idole (Curel)
- 1898–1899: L'Avenir (Ancey)
- 1898–1899: L'Empreinte (Hermant)
- 1898–1899: Les Gaietés de l'Escadron (Courteline)
- 1898–1899: Judith Renaudin (Loti)
- 1898–1899: Le Gendarme est sans pitié (Courteline)
- 1898–1899: Le Doute (Jullien)
- 1898–1899: La Farce du Polichinelle (Kahn and Tailhade)
- 1898–1899: Coeur blette (Coolus)
- 1898–1899: Les Girouettes (Vaucaire)
- 1898–1899: Vallabra (Alexis)
- 1898–1899: Résultat des courses (Brieux)
- 1898–1899: Une pièce nouvelle (Donnay and Descaves)
- 1898–1899: La Mort d'Hypathie (Trarieux)
- 1898–1899: Père naturel (Depré and Charton)
- 1898–1899: En Paix (Bruyère)
- 1899–1900: La Clairière (Donnay and Descaves)
- 1899–1900: Poil de Carotte (Renard)
- 1899–1900: La Gitane (Richepin)
- 1899–1900: Le Marché (Bernstein)
- 1900–1901: Les Remplaçantes (Brieux)
- 1900–1901: Les Avariés (Brieux)
- 1900–1901: L'Article 330 (Courteline)
- 1900–1901: Sur la foi des étoiles (Travieux)
- 1900–1901: La Petite Paroisse (adapted from Daudet)
- 1901–1902: La Fille Sauvage (Curel)
- 1901–1902: L'Honneur (Sudermann)
- 1901–1902: Les Balances (Courteline)
- 1901–1902: La Terre (Hugot and St-Arroman)
- 1901–1902: La Compagne (Schnitzler)
- 1901–1902: Boule de Suif (Méténier)
- 1902–1903: La Bonne Espérance (Heijermans)
- 1902–1903: L'Indiscret (Sée)
- 1902–1903: M Vernet (Renard)
- 1903–1904: Maternité (Brieux)
- 1903–1904: Oiseaux de Passage (Donnay and Descaves)
- 1903–1904: La Paix chez soi (Courteline)
- 1903–1904: La Guerre au village (Trarieux)
- 1904–1905: Le Meilleur Parte (Maindron)
- 1905–1906: Le Coup d'Aile (Curel)
- 1905–1906: Vers l'amour (Gandillot)
- 1905–1906: La Pitié (Leblanc)

=== Théâtre de l'Odéon, Paris ===
- 1896: Britannicus (Jean Racine)
- 1896: Le Médecin malgré lui (Molière)
- 1896: La Capitaine Fracasse (Bergerat)
- 1896: Don Carlos (Schiller)
- 1896: Tartuffe (Molière)
- 1906: Vieil Heidelberg (Meyer-Förster)
- 1906: Le Vray Mistère de la Passion (Gréban)
- 1906: La Préférée (Descaves)
- 1906: La Recommendation (Maurey)
- 1906: Les Honnêtes femmes (Becque)
- 1906: Discipline (Conring)
- 1906: La Race (Thorel)
- 1906: Les Experts (Bénière)
- 1906: Un Client sérieux (Courteline)
- 1906: Le Florentin (La Fontaine)
- 1906: Polyeucte (Pierre Corneille)
- 1906: L'Honneur (Sudermann)
- 1906: Les Précieuses ridicules (Molière)
- 1906: Andromaque (Jean Racine)
- 1906: Jules César (William Shakespeare)
- 1906: Dom Juan (Molière)
- 1906: Britannicus (Jean Racine)
- 1906: Les Plaideurs (Jean Racine)
- 1906: Le Philosophie sans le savoir (Sedaine)
- 1907: Le Jeu de l'amour et du hasard (Marivaux)
- 1907: Le Barbier de Séville (Beaumarchais)
- 1907: Le Maison des Juges (Leroux)
- 1907: Depuis six mois (Maurey)
- 1907: Chatterton (Vigny)
- 1907: La Grand'mère (Victor Hugo)
- 1907: La Faute de l'Abbé Mouret (Bruneau)
- 1907: Florise (Banville)
- 1907: Joseph d'Arimathée (Trarieux)
- 1907: L'Arlésienne (Daudet)
- 1907: Le Chandelier (Musset)
- 1907: La Française (Brieux)
- 1907: Les Goujons (Bénière)
- 1907: L'Otage (Trarieux)
- 1907: Monsieur de Prévan (Gumpel and Delaquys)
- 1907: Le Maître á aimer (Veber and Delorme)
- 1907: Les Plumes du Paon (Bisson and Turique)
- 1907: L'Alouette (Wildenruch, translated by Lutz)
- 1907: Tartuffe (Molière)
- 1907: Son Père (Guinon and Bouchinet)
- 1907: Le Voyage au Caire (Fauré)
- 1907: La Jeunesse du Cid (Castro, translated by Dieulafoy)
- 1907: Le Trésor (Coppée)
- 1907: Le Cid (Pierre Corneille)
- 1907: L'Avare (Molière)
- 1907: Phèdre (Jean Racine)
- 1907: La Farce de la marmite (Plautus, translated by Tailhade)
- 1908: L'Apprentie (Geffroy)
- 1908: Le Chevalier avare (Pushkin, adapted by Bienstock)
- 1908: L'Impromptu de Versailles (Molière)
- 1908: L'Avare chinois (Julien)
- 1908: Électre (Euripides, adapted by Ferdinand Hérold)
- 1908: Iphigénie en Taurid (Goethe, translated by Dwelhauvers)
- 1908: Ramuntcho (Loti)
- 1908: Les Euménides (Aeschylus, adapted by Lisle)
- 1908: Petite Holland (Guitry)
- 1908: La Comédie des familles (Géraldy)
- 1908: Le Chauffeur (Maurey)
- 1908: Alibi (Trarieux)
- 1908: Une Vieille contait (Gumpel and Delaquys)
- 1908: Le Nirvana (Vérola)
- 1908: La Voix frêle (Thierry and Bertaux)
- 1908: Velléda (Magre)
- 1908: L'Autre (André Dumas)
- 1908: Les Corbeaux (Becque)
- 1908: Le Domino á quatre (Becque)
- 1908: Á Pierre Corneille (compilation)
- 1908: Stances á la marquise (Corneille)
- 1908: Le Coeur et la Dot (Mallefille)
- 1908: Parmi les Pierres (Sudermann, translated by Rémon and Valentin)
- 1908: Karita (Sonniès)
- 1908: L'Éole des femmes (Molière)
- 1908: La Critique de l'École des femmes (Molière)
- 1908: La Dévotion á la croix (Calderón)
- 1908: Don Pietro Caruso (Bracco, translated by Sansot-Orland)
- 1908: Les Fausses confidences (Marivaux)
- 1908: Le Poussin (Guiraud)
- 1908: Pylade (Legendre)
- 1908: Bienheureuse (Bouchor)
- 1908: Les Fourberies de Scapin (Molière)
- 1908: Saint Genest (Rotrou)
- 1909: La Tragédie Royale (Bouhélier)
- 1909: La Mort de Pan (Arnoux)
- 1909: Laurent (Céard and Croze)
- 1909: Molière et sa femme (Pottecher)
- 1909: Les Grands (Veber and Basset)
- 1909: Cinna (Pierre Corneille)
- 1909: Andromaque (Euripides, adapted by Ferdinand Hérold)
- 1909: Beethoven (René Fauchois)
- 1909: Le Mariage de Figaro (Beaumarchais)
- 1909: Poil de carotte (Renard)
- 1909: Les Danicheff (Newsky)
- 1909: Les Deux génies (Bénédict)
- 1909: George Dandin (Molière)
- 1909: Cavalleria rusticana (Verga, translated by Solanges and Darsenne)
- 1909: Les Emigrants (Hirsch)
- 1909: La Bigote (Renard)
- 1909: La Moralité nouvelle d'un empereur (Rial-Faber, adapted from Janet and Fournier)
- 1909: La Farce du chauldronnier (Rial-Faber)
- 1909: L'Aveugle et le Boiteux (Vigne)
- 1909: Le Cry (Gringoire)
- 1909: Male fin, ou le repas trop copieux (Chesnaye)
- 1909: Jarnac (Hennique and Gravier)
- 1909: Les Sept contre Thèbes (Aeschylus, adapted by Ferdinand Hérold)
- 1909: Comme les feuilles (Giacosa, translated by Darsenne)
- 1909: Les Femmes savantes (Molière)
- 1909: Sur la lisière d'un bois (Victor Hugo)
- 1909: Horace (Pierre Corneille)
- 1909: Charles VII chez ses grands vassaux (Alexandre Dumas père)
- 1910: Turcaret (Lesage)
- 1910: La Maison (Arnoux)
- 1910: Petite femme (Reynold)
- 1910: Phèdre et Hippolyte (Pradon)
- 1910: Antar (Chekri-Ganem)
- 1910: Lazare le pâtre (Bouchardy)
- 1910: Le Légataire universel (Regnard)
- 1910: L'Éole des Ménages (Honoré de Balzac)
- 1910: Manette Salomon (Goncourt)
- 1910: Le Malade Imaginaire (Molière)
- 1910: Coriolan (William Shakespeare, translated by Sonniès)
- 1910: Le Candidat (Flaubert)
- 1910: Mademoiselle Molière (Leloir and Nigond)
- 1910: Thérèse Raquin (Émile Zola)
- 1910: Athalie (Jean Racine)
- 1910: Monsieur de Pourceaugnac (Molière)
- 1910: Les Plus beaux jours (Traversi, adapted by Darsenne)
- 1910: Un Soir (Trarieux)
- 1910: Iphigénie en Aulide (Jean Racine)
- 1910: Le Menteur (Corneille)
- 1910: Zaïre (Voltaire)
- 1910: Les Trois Sultanes (Favart)
- 1910: Les Affranchis (Lenéru)
- 1910: Roméo et Juliet (Shakespeare, translated by Gramont)
- 1910: Le Médecin malgré lui (Molière)
- 1911: Rodogune (Corneille)
- 1911: L'Inquiète (Richard)
- 1911: L'Épreuve (Marivaux)
- 1911: La Femme d'intrigues (Dancourt)
- 1911: La Boulangère (Marlet)
- 1911: Le Pacha (Benjamin)
- 1911: Le Misanthrope (Molière)
- 1911: Mère (Dick-May)
- 1911: Maud (Nouy)
- 1911: La Cour d'amour de Romanin (Puyfontaine)
- 1911: L'Armée dans la ville (Romains)
- 1911: Rivoli (Fauchois)
- 1911: La Revanche de Boileau (Galzy)
- 1911: Chapelain décoiffé (Boileau)
- 1911: Les Héros de roman (Boileau)
- 1911: La Lumière (Duhamel)
- 1911: Vers l'amour (Gandillot)
- 1911: Coeur maternel (Franck)
- 1911: L'Apôtre (Loyson)
- 1911: Le Jouer (Regnard)
- 1911: Les Mages sans étoiles (Schneider)
- 1911: L'Assomption de Verlaine (Raynaud)
- 1911: Les Uns et les Autres (Verlaine)
- 1911: Diane de Poitiers (Faramond)
- 1911: Le Bourgois Gentilhomme (Molière)
- 1911: Musotte (Maupassant and Normand)
- 1911: La Mort de Sénéque (Tristan L'Hermite)
- 1911: Le Tribut (Karcher and Jeanne)
- 1911: David Copperfield (Maurey, adapted from Dickens)
- 1911: Aux jardins de Murcie (Feliu y Codina)
- 1911: Les Frères Lambertier (Hell and Villeroy)
- 1911: Madame Dandin (Croze)
- 1911: Bajazet (Jean Racine)
- 1912: Le Pédant joué (Bergerac)
- 1912: Le Redoutable (Lenéru)
- 1912: L'Âne de Buridan (Lafenestre)
- 1912: La Coupe enchantée (La Fontaine)
- 1912: Esther, princesse d'Israël (André Dumas and Leconte)
- 1912: Près de lui (Amiel)
- 1912: La Sentence (Barot-Forlière)
- 1912: L'Épée (Passillé)
- 1912: Troïlus et Cressida (Shakespeare, translated by Vedel)
- 1912: La Reine Margot (Dumas père and Maquet)
- 1912: L'Étoile de Séville (Vega)
- 1912: L'Honneur japonais (Anthelme)
- 1912: Amphitryon (Molière)
- 1912: La Foi (Brieux)
- 1912: Le Soulier de Corneille (Gautier)
- 1912: Les Perses (Aeschylus, adapted by Ferdinand Hérold)
- 1912: Dans l'ombre des statues (Duhamel)
- 1912: Le Dépit amoureux (Molière)
- 1912: Madame de Châtillon (Vérola)
- 1912: La Locandiera (Goldoni, adapted by Darsenne)
- 1912: Le Double Madrigal (Auzanet)
- 1912: L'Heure des tziganes (Larguier)
- 1912: Faust (Goethe, translated by Vedel)
- 1913: Sylla (Mortier)
- 1913: Héraclius (Corneille)
- 1913: La Maison divisée (Fernet)
- 1913: La Nuit florentine (Bergerat, adapted from Machiavelli)
- 1913: La Rue du Sentier (Decourcelle and Maurel)
- 1913: L'Éole de la médisance (Sheridan, translated by Oudine and Bazile)
- 1913: Esther (Jean Racine)
- 1913: La Grand-rue (Mortier)
- 1913: Réussir (Zahori)
- 1913: Dannémorah (Puyfontaine)
- 1913: Le Galant précepteur (Hollande)
- 1913: Moïse (Chateaubriand)
- 1913: Est-il bon? Est-il méchant? (Diderot)
- 1913: Le Mariage forcé (Molière)
- 1913: La Poudre aux yeux (Labiche and Martin)
- 1913: L'Homme n'est pas parfait (Thiboust and Barrière)
- 1913: Histoire de Manon Lescaut (Gold)
- 1913: L'Étourdi (Molière)
- 1913: Le Diplomate (Scribe and Delavigne)
- 1913: La Demoiselle á marier (Scribe and Mélesville)
- 1913: Rachel (Grillet)
- 1913: Le Voyage á Dieppe (Vafflard and Fulgence)
- 1913: Indiana et Charlemagne (Bayard and Dumanoir)
- 1913: Oscar ou le mari qui trompe sa femme (Scribe and Duveyrier)
- 1913: Les Vieux péchés (Mélesville and Dumanoir)
- 1914: Guillaume Tell (Schiller, translated by Vedel)
- 1914: Geneviève ou la jalousie paternelle (Scribe)
- 1914: Michel Perrin (Mélesville and Duveyrier)
- 1914: Il ne faut jurer de rien (Musset)
- 1914: Le Bourgeois aux Champs (Brieux)
- 1914: Le Seul rêve (Grawitz)
- 1914: Bruno le fileur (Cogniard brothers)
- 1914: Faut s'entendre (Duveyrier)
- 1914: Dom Juan (Molière)
- 1914: Le Jeune mari (Mazères)
- 1914: Le Feu au convent (Barrière)
- 1914: La Petite ville (Picard)
- 1914: Le Gamin de Paris (Bayard and Vanderburch)
- 1914: Le Dîner de Madelon (Désaugiers)
- 1914: Psyché (Molière)
