= Fortunio (opera) =

Opera by André Messager

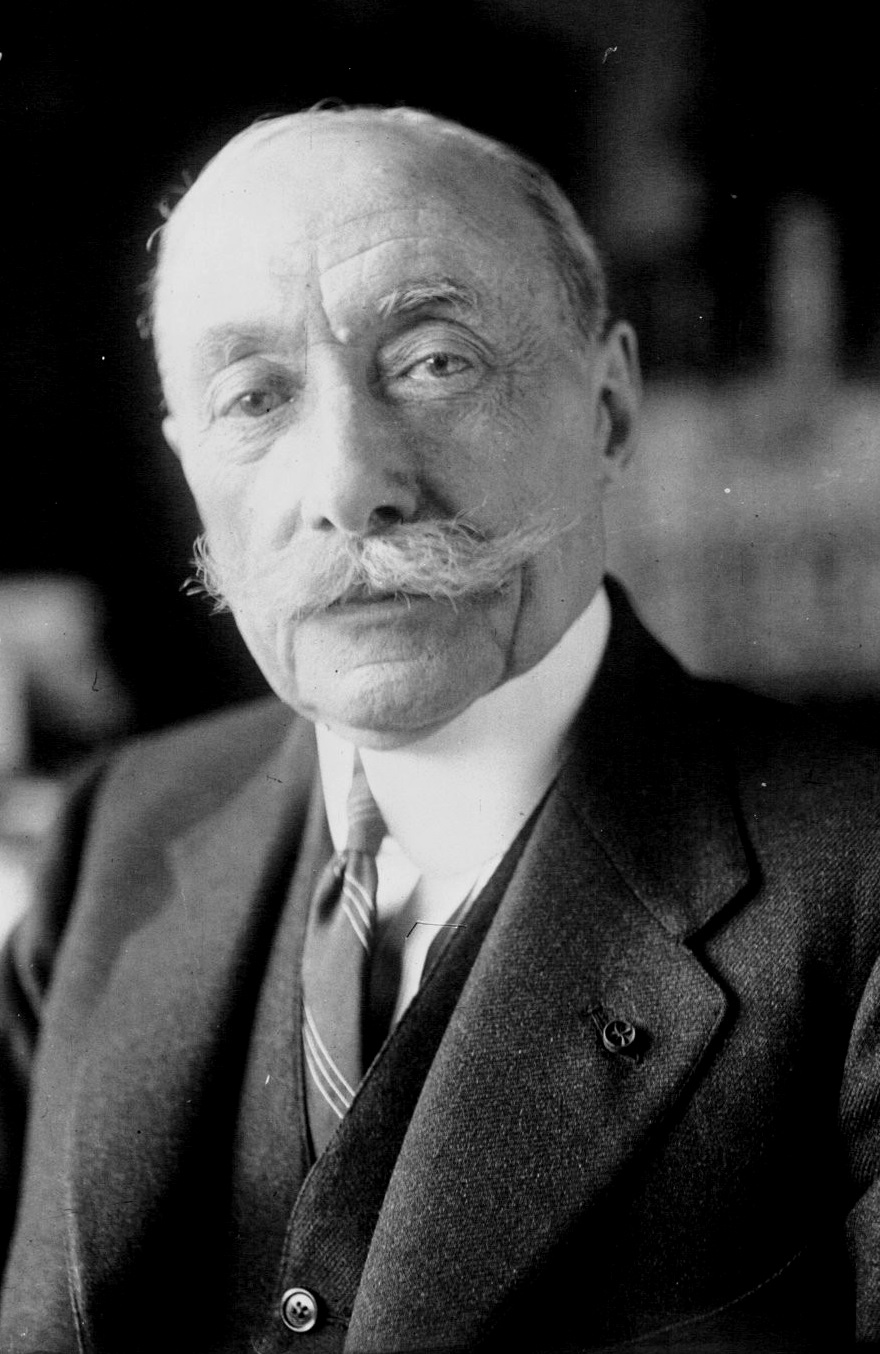
André Messager, 1921

Fortunio is a comédie lyrique or opera in four acts (originally five) and five tableaux by the French composer André Messager. The libretto by Gaston Arman de Caillavet and Robert de Flers is based on Alfred de Musset's 1835 comedy Le Chandelier.

It was first performed by the Opéra-Comique at the Salle Favart in Paris, on 5 June 1907, and remained part of the regular repertory until the 1940s. In recent years it has been revived in several productions in France and other countries.

The opera has no spoken dialogue and comprises completely sung recitative and arias. Fortunio, clerk to the lawyer Maître André, becomes the decoy for an affair between Jacqueline – the lawyer's wife – and Clavaroche, an army officer, Fortunio falls in love with Jacqueline before discovering what is going on between her and the officer. Eventually she falls for Fortunio's innocent charm and sends Clavaroche away.

== Background ==
Alfred de Musset's play Le Chandelier (Note: In French usage of the time a chandelier could mean a decoy for a love affair.) was published in 1835 in the Revue des deux Mondes, but was not staged until thirteen years later. It was produced at the Théâtre Historique, Paris in 1848, and was revived in 1850, but its theme of an adulterous affair scandalized some middle-class theatregoers, which led to a ban on productions from the French government. This had not prevented two composers before Messager from using the play as the inspiration for operas. Auber's Zanetta ran for 35 performances at the Salle Favart in 1840. The action was transplanted from 17th-century France to 18th-century Palermo, but the plot was essentially unchanged.

Offenbach, who had written a song as incidental music for the 1850 revival of Musset's play, used it as the centrepiece of a one-act opéra comique, La chanson de Fortunio, with a plot depicting Fortunio as an old man receiving treatment similar to that he had inflicted on his elderly employer in the original drama. The piece was first given at Théâtre des Bouffes-Parisiens in 1861. The lyric of Fortunio's song set by Offenbach was set in a Russian translation by Tchaikovsky in 1875, but was intended for concert or domestic rather than stage performance.

Messager's librettists, Gaston Arman de Caillavet and Robert de Flers, expanded the original play, adding a scene-setting first act, and a later tableau (eventually cut from the opera's final, four-act structure) which depicted a nocturnal party. The production was staged by Albert Carré, director of the Opéra Comique, who was keen to foster the French repertoire at the theatre.

== Performance history ==
Fortunio was premiered on 5 June 1907 by the Opéra-Comique at the Salle Favart in Paris. The composer conducted, and the audience included his fellow composers Claude Debussy, Reynaldo Hahn, Gabriel Pierné, and Gabriel Fauré, the last of whom reviewed the work for Le Figaro:

If there is one subject that had to tempt a musician, it is that of Le Chandelier, especially if this musician possesses, like Messager, the gifts of elegance and clarity, of wit, of playful grace, united to the most perfect knowledge of the technique of his art, the rarest qualities of emotion and delicacy.

In its original form the work had five acts. It was revived in a revised four-act version at the Opéra-Comique in 1910. During its first 50 years the work received more than 70 performances in Paris, with the composer conducting the runs in 1915 and 1920, and Villette singing Gertrude up to 1946.

Fortunio was produced at La Monnaie in Brussels in 1908, 1931 and 1944. The opera was mounted in Bordeaux in November 1984 and Lyons in May 1987. It had its British premiere in 2001 at Grange Park Opera. A co-production between Fribourg, Besançon and Opéra de Dijon was seen in 2008. The Opéra-Comique mounted six performances of a new production in December 2009, conducted by Louis Langrée. In 2013 the Opéra-théâtre de Saint-Étienne presented a new production at the Grand Théâtre Massenet.

== Roles ==
Role	Voice type	Premiere Cast, 5 June 1907 (Conductor: André Messager)
Fortunio	tenor	Fernand Francell
Jacqueline, wife of Maître André	soprano	Marguerite Giraud-Carré
Landry	baritone	Jean Périer
Guillaume	bass	Gustave Huberdeau
Madelon, a servant	soprano	Béatrice La Palme
Maître André	baritone	Lucien Fugère
Clavaroche, a captain	baritone	Hector Dufranne
Gertrude, a servant	soprano	Marguerite Villette
Maître Subtil	tenor	Maurice Cazeneuve
Lieutenant de Verbois	baritone	Paul Guillamat
Lieutenant d'Azincourt	tenor	Gaston de Poumayrac
Chorus: Townspeople, clerks, soldiers

== Synopsis ==
=== Act 1 ===
On the square outside the church, people are milling around and games of boules are in progress. Landry, the merry clerk of Maître André, toasts his master, a fine lawyer and the husband of the young and beautiful Jacqueline. Maître Subtil and his nephew Fortunio, just arrived from the country, enter; Subtil has just obtained a position with his colleague Maître André. Landry, Fortunio's older cousin, gives advice for his new career, but Fortunio, shy and dreamy, does not listen.

A regiment enters, headed by its new captain, the dashing Clavaroche, who asks about potential female conquests. Discovering that Jacqueline is not available, he naturally decides that he will try to seduce her, and shortly sees her leaving the church. He gains the confidence of her husband, impressed by his uniform, which opens the doors of André's house. Fortunio too has been enraptured by the sight of Jacqueline and pours out his emotion as the curtain falls.

=== Act 2 ===
A few days later early in the morning, Maître André awakens his wife, alarmed: one of his clerks saw a man enter at night through the window in her room. To divert her husband, Jacqueline, in tears, while rejecting the charge, accuses her husband of neglecting her. Maître André sheepishly leaves – and Clavaroche clambers out of the cupboard where he had been hiding.

The pair decide that they need a decoy to divert Maître André's suspicions. The solution will be in the form of a "chandelier": a young man to flirt with her while leaving the identity of the true lover concealed. When the young clerks pay their morning respects to her she is touched the devoted response of a blushing Fortunio: the "chandelier" is found. After she has sent the others away, he reveals his shyness and quickly promises Jacqueline unswerving devotion.

=== Act 3 ===
Learning that Guillaume had seen a man sneaking into Jacqueline's bedroom, Fortunio dreams of being the protector of her affairs of the heart. This only provokes jeers from the other clerks, but Fortunio does not care: he prefers his dreams to harsh reality.

Maître André introduces Jacqueline to Fortunio, whom he allow to escort his wife to prove that he is not jealous. At a dinner for four (the wife, husband, lover and the innocent admirer), Fortunio opens his heart in a song whose beauty and innocence sows doubt in the mind of Jacqueline, who tenderly welcomes the young man's passion while the two older men play cards. Clavaroche tells Jacqueline that Maître André is still suspicious of her following another report from Guillaume, and will have guards that evening under her window – of which he, Clavaroche will be one, aiming to ensnare Fortunio. Overhearing this conversation, Fortunio understands the role he is playing.

=== Act 4 ===
Having learnt that Maître André has laid a trap for his wife's lover, Clavaroche has pointed the finger of suspicion at Fortunio by sending the young man a note, supposedly from Jacqueline, inviting him to join her. To counter the threat, Jacqueline has sent her maid Madelon to warn the young man, but too late; Fortunio enters the lion's den saying that he will throw himself into the ambush from despair of having been used. However, Jacqueline assures him: he is not just loved – he is adored!

As the footsteps of Maître André and Clavaroche approach, she hastily hides the young man in an alcove, not in the same place as her military lover. So the jealous husband has to apologise for his unwarranted suspicions, and the captain finds no one hiding in the wardrobe; she sends both away, giving the furious Clavaroche a candlestick (Note: Un chandelier is principally a 'candle-stick' in French.) to light his way, thus leaving her alone with Fortunio, who comes out and falls into her arms.

== Recordings ==
John Eliot Gardiner conducted a complete recording for Erato in 1987 with Colette Alliot-Lugaz, Michel Trempont and Thierry Dran. In 1961 French EMI recorded excerpts with Liliane Berton, Michel Sénéchal, Michel Dens and Jean-Christophe Benoît.

== Notes, references and sources ==
=== Sources ===
- Camus, David; et al. (2013). Fortunio: Dossier pédagogique (PDF). Saint-Etienne: Opéra de Saint-Etienne.
- Letellier, Robert Ignatius (2010). Daniel-François-Esprit Auber: The Man and His Music. Newcastle upon Tyne: Cambridge Scholars. ISBN 978-1-4438-2597-9.
- Letellier, Robert Ignatius (2015). Operetta: A Sourcebook, Volume I. Newcastle upon Tyne: Cambridge Scholars. ISBN 978-1-4438-6690-3.
- Sylvester, Richard (2002). Tchaikovsky's Complete Songs: A Companion with Texts and Translations. Bloomington, Indiana. ISBN 978-0-253-21676-2.
- Wolff, Stéphane (1953). Un demi-siècle d'Opéra-Comique (1900-1950). Paris: André Bonne. OCLC 250469567.
