= Léontine Lippmann =

French socialite (1844–1910)

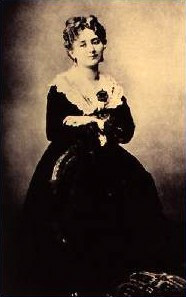
- Born: June 14, 1844
- Died: January 12, 1910 (aged 65)
- Other names: Madame Arman, Madame Arman de Caillavet
- Known for: Hosting literary salons
- Spouse: Albert Arman
- Children: Gaston Arman de Caillavet

Léontine Lippmann (14 June 1844 – 12 January 1910), better known by her married name of Madame Arman or Madame Arman de Caillavet, was the muse of Anatole France and the hostess of a highly fashionable literary salon during the French Third Republic. Madame Verdurin in Proust's In Search of Lost Time was modelled on Lippmann.

== Life ==
Lippmann was born into a wealthy Jewish family as a banker's daughter and later married Albert Arman. Arman's mother's maiden name was Caillavet, so they called themselves Arman de Caillavet. They had one child, the playwright Gaston Arman de Caillavet. Neither of them was faithful to the other, though they never divorced.

Lippman was intelligent, cultivated and spoke four languages, and was described as beautiful in her youth, with clear blue eyes, black hair, and a mocking mouth. She often attended the salons of Lydie Aubernon and it was there that she met Anatole France in 1883. From 1888 on, the pair engaged in a passionate, exclusive liaison, which was often stormy due to the jealousy of both parties. She inspired his novels Thaïs (1890) and Le Lys rouge (1894).

== Salon ==
Mme de Caillavet started her own salon in the hôtel particulier at 12 Avenue Hoche, near the Place de l'Étoile. Sitting in a bergère to the right of the fireplace, with Anatole France standing in front of the fireplace, every Sunday she welcomed the French fashionable, intellectual and political elites, including writers, actors, lawyers and députés (but not musicians, since she and France did not like music). On Wednesdays, Mme de Caillavet held conversational dinners on the model of those of Mme Aubernon, where could be found Alexandre Dumas, the Hellenist Brochard, Professor Pozzi, Leconte de Lisle, José-Maria de Heredia, Ernest Renan and, of course, Anatole France.

=== Attendees ===
Many well-known people attended Mme de Caillavet's salons, including:

- Maurice Barrès
- Louis Barthou
- Tristan Bernard
- Sarah Bernhardt
- Prince and Princess Bibesco
- Léon Blum
- the sculptor Antoine Bourdelle
- Georg Brandes
- Aristide Briand
- Georges Clemenceau
- Colette and her first husband Henry Gauthier-Villars (known as Willy)
- Michel Corday
- Dr. Paul-Louis Couchoud
- François Crucy
- Marie and Pierre Curie
- Jean-Élie, Duke Decazes
- Gugliemo Ferrero
- Robert de Flers
- Loïe Fuller, the dancer
- Fernand Gregh
- Paul de Grunebaum
- Lucien Guitry the actor, and his son Sacha Guitry
- Gabriel Hanotaux
- Jean Jaurès
- Léopold Kaher
- Jules Lemaitre
- Count de Lisle (Leconte de Lisle cannot be translated in "Count de Lisle". Leconte is not a title but his family name.)
- Pierre Loti
- Charles Maurras
- Pierre Mille
- Robert de Montesquiou
- Théophile Moreux, the abbot and astronomer
- Abbot Mugnier
- Munkacsy, the painter
- Anna de Noailles
- Hugo Ogetti
- Raymond Poincaré
- Prof. Samuel-Jean Pozzi
- Marcel Prévost
- Count Giuseppe Primoli
- Marcel Proust
- Charles Rappoport
- Joseph Reinach
- Réjane, the actress
- Commandant Rivière
- J.-H. Rosny the elder
- Baron and Baroness Rothschild
- Marcel Schwob
- Marcelle Tinayre

== Sources ==
- Jeanne Maurice Pouquet, Le Salon de Madame Arman de Caillavet, 1926.
- George Painter, Marcel Proust, London, Cratton and Windus, 1959
