= Robert Ozanne =

French actor

- Born: Robert Marcel Achille Ozanne; 13 February 1898; Paris, France
- Died: 14 September 1941 (aged 43); Limeil-Brévannes, Val-de-Marne, France
- Occupation: Actor
- Years active: 1932 - 1943 (film)

Robert Ozanne (February 13, 1898 – September 14, 1941) was a French film actor.

== Selected filmography ==
- The Three Musketeers (1932)
- The Oil Sharks (1933)
- Miquette (1934)
- The House on the Dune (1934)
- The Lower Depths (1936)
- Monsieur Personne (1936)
- Pépé le Moko (1937)
- The Man of the Hour (1937)
- Woman of Malacca (1937)
- Boulot the Aviator (1937)
- In Venice, One Night (1937)
- A Picnic on the Grass (1937)
- The Men Without Names (1937)
- Return at Dawn (1938)
- The Woman Thief (1938)
- A Foolish Maiden (1938)
- Alexis, Gentleman Chauffeur (1938)
- Chéri-Bibi (1938)
- The Fatted Calf (1939)
- Extenuating Circumstances (1939)
- Behind the Facade (1939)
- Narcisse (1940)
- The Emigrant (1940)
- The Mondesir Heir (1940)
- Beating Heart (1940)
- Paris-New York (1940)
- The Last of the Six (1941)

== Bibliography ==
- Youngkin, Stephen. The Lost One: A Life of Peter Lorre. University Press of Kentucky, 2005.
