= Torrent (1926 film) =

Silent romantic drama by Monta Bell

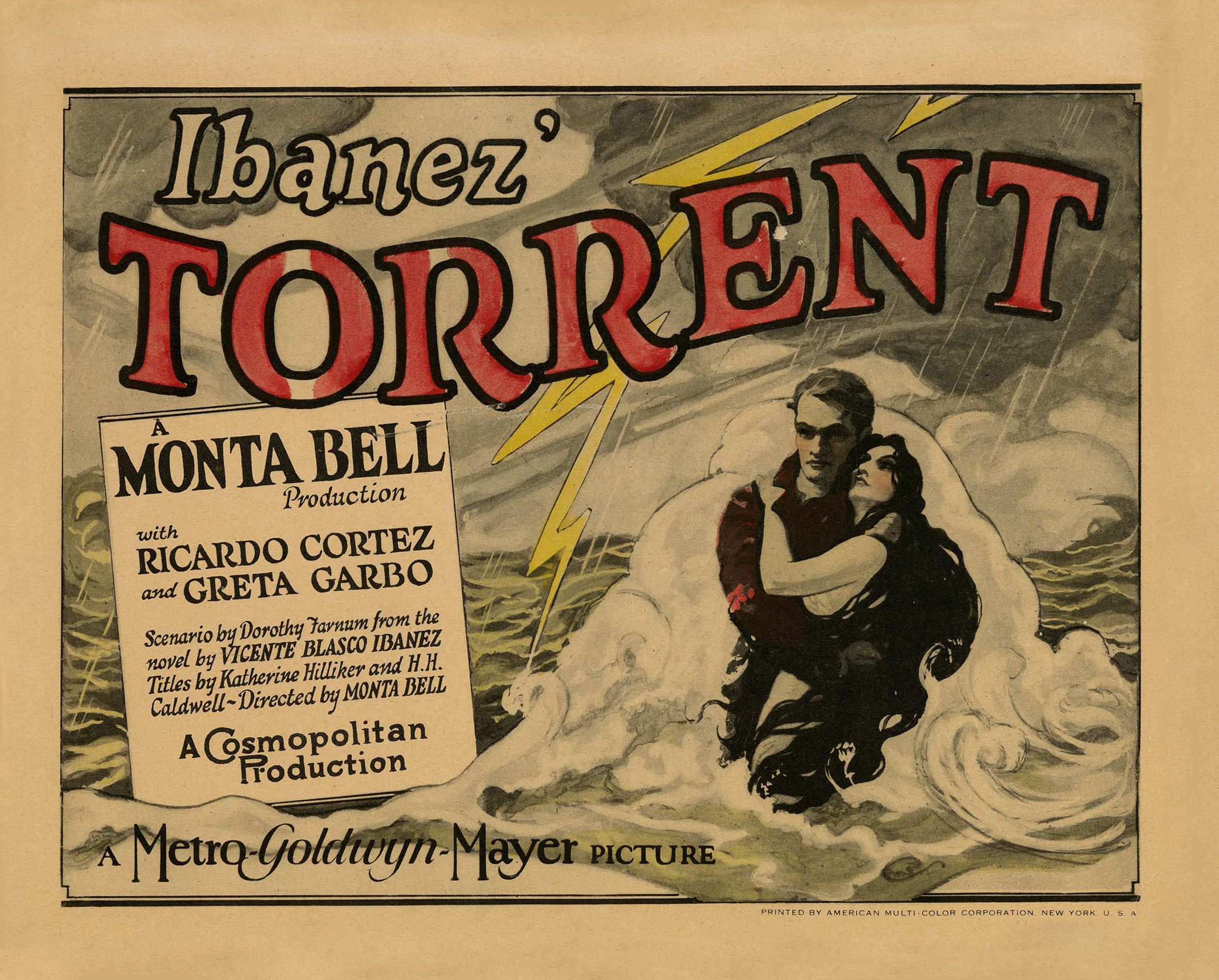
- Theatrical release poster
- Directed by: Monta Bell (uncredited)
- Written by: Dorothy Farnum (adaptation)
- Based on: Entre Naranjos; 1900? novella by Vicente Blasco Ibáñez
- Produced by: Irving Thalberg
- Starring: Ricardo Cortez; Greta Garbo
- Cinematography: William H. Daniels
- Edited by: Frank Sullivan
- Music by: Arthur Barrow
- Distributed by: Metro-Goldwyn-Mayer
- Release date: February 21, 1926
- Running time: 87 minutes
- Country: United States
- Language: Silent (English intertitles)
- Budget: $250,443.27

Torrent is a 1926 American silent romantic drama film directed by an uncredited Monta Bell, based on a novel by Vicente Blasco Ibáñez, and released on February 21, 1926. Torrent was the first American film starring Swedish actress Greta Garbo. The film also starred Ricardo Cortez and Martha Mattox.

The title refers to a flood that occurs in the small town where most of the action takes place, which draws the two romantic leading characters closer together.

Torrent (1926)

== Plot ==
As described in a film magazine review, Donna Brull is opposed to her son Rafael marrying the peasant Leonora, a poor young Spanish woman. She leaves the small town and goes to Paris where she becomes a famous opera singer. Later, she visits her home, where Rafael saves her and Remedios, the young woman he is engaged to, from drowning in a flood. Eight years pass and Leonora and Rafael, who is now married, meet again. Although she still loves him, she resumes her operatic career and Rafael remains with his wife.

== Cast ==
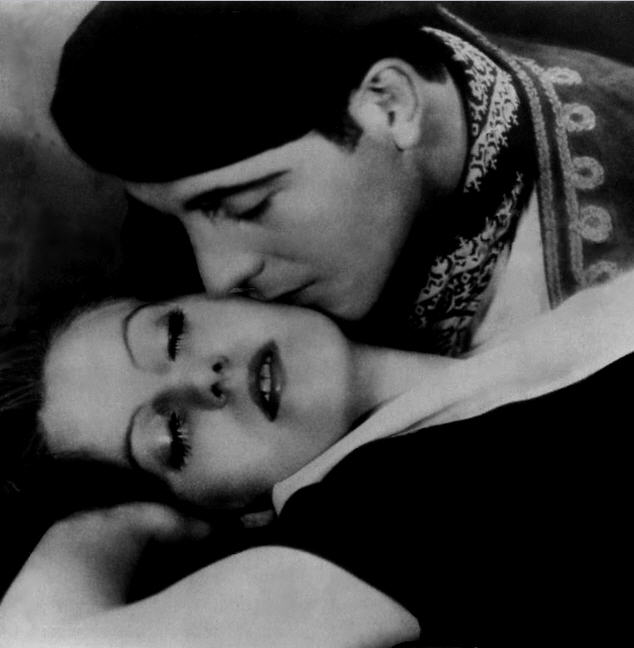
Publicity still for the film with Garbo and Cortez.

- Ricardo Cortez as Don Rafael Brull
- Greta Garbo as Leonora Moreno, aka La Brunna
- Gertrude Olmstead as Remedios Matías
- Edward Connelly as Pedro Moreno
- Lucien Littlefield as Cupido, the Barber
- Martha Mattox as Doña Bernarda Brull
- Lucy Beaumont as Doña Pepa Moreno
- Tully Marshall as Don Andrés, a Lawyer
- Mack Swain as Don Matías
- Arthur Edmund Carewe as Salvatti (as Arthur Edmund Carew)
- Lillian Leighton as Isabella, La Brunna's Maid
- Mario Carillo as King of Spain (uncredited)
- André Cheron as Man in Audience (uncredited)
- Dorothy Sebastian as Woman in Audience (uncredited)

== Reception ==
MGM was uncertain about how to cast Garbo after her arrival in Hollywood. In Torrent, her first American film, she was cast as Leonora, a young Spanish peasant woman, and MGM was pleased with the results. Variety reviewed the film and described Garbo in her American debut as " a girl with everything, looks, acting ability and personality". The film grossed $460,000 in the USA and $208,000 internationally, it grossed $668,000 worldwide, netting a $126,000 profit for MGM. Louis B. Mayer's initial instinct about the actress's ability paid off, and the film was a success. Torrent was released on DVD in 2011 as part of the Warner Archive Collection.
