= The Beautiful Adventure (1932 German-language film) =

1932 film

- Film poster
- Directed by: Reinhold Schünzel
- Written by: Robert de Flers (play); Étienne Rey (play); Gaston Arman de Caillavet (play); Emeric Pressburger; Reinhold Schünzel
- Produced by: Günther Stapenhorst
- Starring: Käthe von Nagy; Wolf Albach-Retty; Alfred Abel
- Cinematography: Robert Baberske; Fritz Arno Wagner
- Edited by: Eduard von Borsody
- Music by: Hans-Otto Borgmann; Ralph Erwin
- Production company: UFA
- Distributed by: UFA
- Release date: 18 August 1932
- Running time: 82 minutes
- Country: Germany
- Language: German

The Beautiful Adventure (German: Das schöne Abenteuer) is a 1932 West German romantic comedy film directed by Reinhold Schünzel and starring Käthe von Nagy, Wolf Albach-Retty and Alfred Abel. It was shot at the Babelsberg Studios in Berlin and premiered at the city's Gloria-Palast cinema. The film's sets were designed by the art director Werner Schlichting. A separate French language version was also made.

== Plot ==
On her wedding day a young bride takes off with her cousin, who she has always loved.

== Cast ==
- Käthe von Nagy as Helene de Trevillac
- Wolf Albach-Retty as Andre d'Eguzon
- Alfred Abel as Graf d'Eguzon
- Ida Wüst as Graefin d'Eguzon
- Adele Sandrock as Frau de Trevillac
- Otto Wallburg as Valentin le Barroyer
- Hilde Hildebrand as Frau de Serignon
- Julius Falkenstein as Herr Chartrain
- Gertrud Wolle as Frau Chartrain
- Kurt Vespermann as Herr Desmigneres
- Blandine Ebinger as Frau Desmigneres
- Julius E. Herrmann as Herr Dubois
- Ferdinand Hart as Herr Durand
- Lydia Pollman as Jeanne
- Oskar Sima
- Heinz Gordon as Didier
- Rudolf Biebrach as Dr. Pinbrache
- Käthe Haack as Jeantine
- Ilse Furstenberg
- Hedwig Schlichter
- Fitti Topp as Kind

== See also ==
- The Beautiful Adventure (1917 film)
- The Beautiful Adventure (1942 film)(German-French romantic comedy film)

== Bibliography ==
- Kreimeier, Klaus (1999). The Ufa Story: A History of Germany's Greatest Film Company, 1918–1945. Berkeley: University of California Press. ISBN 978-0-520-22069-0.
