= Claude Terrasse =

French composer

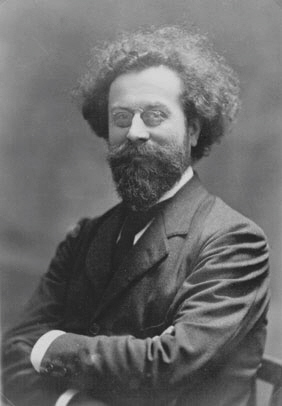
Claude Terrasse

Claude Terrasse (27 January 1867 – 30 June 1923) was a French composer of operettas.

Terrasse was born in L'Arbresle, Rhône. He became known by writing the music for the play Ubu Roi by Alfred Jarry in 1896. In Paris, his brother-in-law, the painter Pierre Bonnard, introduced him to the artistic world and the avant-garde literature and art of the time. Bonnard also did several portraits of him.

In 1890, Terrasse married Andrée Bonnard, sister of the artist Pierre Bonnard. By 1899, they had six children, several of whom appear in Bonnard paintings. Their son Charles Terrasse published a monograph on Bonnard in 1927.

Terrasse died in Paris, and was buried in the Montmartre Cemetery.

== Works ==
- Vive la France! – Trilogie à grand spectacle (trilogy of a great spectacle) – libretto by Franc-Nohain – (Theater of the Pantins, Paris; 29 March 1898)
- La petite femme de Loth – Opéra bouffe in 3 acts – libretto by Tristan Bernard (first presented at the Théâtre des Mathurins, Paris; 1 October 1900)
- Les travaux d'Hercule – opera in 3 acts – libretto by Robert de Flers and Gaston Arman de Caillavet – (Théâtre des Bouffes Parisiens, Paris; 7 March 1901)
- Le sire de Vergy – Opéra bouffe in 3 acts – libretto by Robert de Flers and Gaston Arman de Caillavet – (Théâtre des Variétés, Paris; 16 April 1903)
- Monsieur de la Palisse – opera in 3 acts – libretto by Robert de Flers and Gaston Arman de Caillavet – (Paris; 2 November 1904)
- L'ingénu libertin, ou La Marquise et le Marmiton – conte galant en trois actes – libretto by Louis Artus – (Théâtre des Bouffes Parisiens, Paris; 11 December 1907)
- Le mariage de Télémaque – Opéra bouffe in 5 acts – libretto by Jules Lemaitre and Maurice Donnay – (Opéra-Comique, Paris; 4 May 1910)
- Les lucioles – ballet by Mme. Mariquita – (Opéra-Comique, Paris; 28 December 1910)
- Pantagruel – opera in 5 acts – libretto by Alfred Jarry and Eugène Demolder (30 January 1911)
- Miss Alice des P.T.T. musical comedy in 3 acts – lyrics by Tristan Bernard and Maurice Vaucaire – (Theater of the Cigale, Paris; 14 December 1912)
- Faust en ménage – lyric fantasy in one act – libretto by Albert Carré – (Theater of the Potinière, Paris; 5 January 1924)
