= Gabrielle Ringertz =

Swedish writer and translator

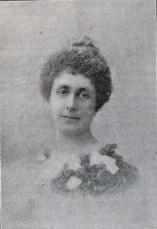
A 1901 portrait of Ringertz.

Gabrielle Monique Johns (1863 – 1945), known as Gabrielle Ringertz and sometimes Monica Bang, was a Swedish writer and translator.

Ringertz married an officer in 1890. In 1917, she entered a Gothenburg screenwriting competition; the jury refused to award a first prize out of the 250 entries, based on poor quality, but gave a joint second prize, of which Ringertz was one of the winners. Of the two, Ringertz's script was later developed by Manne Göthson into the film Storstadsfaror, starring Mary Johnson. Storstadsfaror told a common story of a young woman struggling in the big city before being rescued by wealthy friends and the Church, and marrying at the end. Though there are poor records of her other writings, she also published poetry under the pseudonym "Monica Bang" between 1902 and 1939.
