= The House of Lies (1926 film) =

1925 film

- Directed by: Lupu Pick
- Written by: Fanny Carlsen; Lupu Pick
- Based on: The Wild Duck by Henrik Ibsen
- Produced by: Lupu Pick
- Starring: Werner Krauss; Mary Johnson; Lucie Höflich; Fritz Rasp
- Cinematography: Carl Drews
- Production company: Rex-Film
- Distributed by: UFA
- Release date: 22 January 1926 (Berlin)
- Running time: 101 minutes
- Country: Germany
- Languages: Silent; German intertitles

The House of Lies (German: Das Haus der Lüge) is a 1926 German silent drama film directed by Lupu Pick and starring Werner Krauss, Mary Johnson and Lucie Höflich. It is an adaptation of Ibsen's 1884 play The Wild Duck. The film's art direction was by Albin Grau. Pick also produced the film and was one of its co-writers.

== Cast ==
- Werner Krauss as Hjalmar Ekdal
- Mary Johnson as Hedwig, Helmars Tochter
- Lucie Höflich as Gina, Hjalmars Frau
- Fritz Rasp as Kandidat Molwik
- Paul Henckels as Alter Ekdal
- Walter Janssen as Gregers, Werles Sohn
- Albert Steinrück as Jan Werle
- Agnes Straub as Frau Sörby
- Eduard von Winterstein as Dr. Helling

== Bibliography ==
- Hans-Michael Bock and Tim Bergfelder. The Concise Cinegraph: An Encyclopedia of German Cinema. Berghahn Books.
