= The King on Main Street =

1925 film by Monta Bell

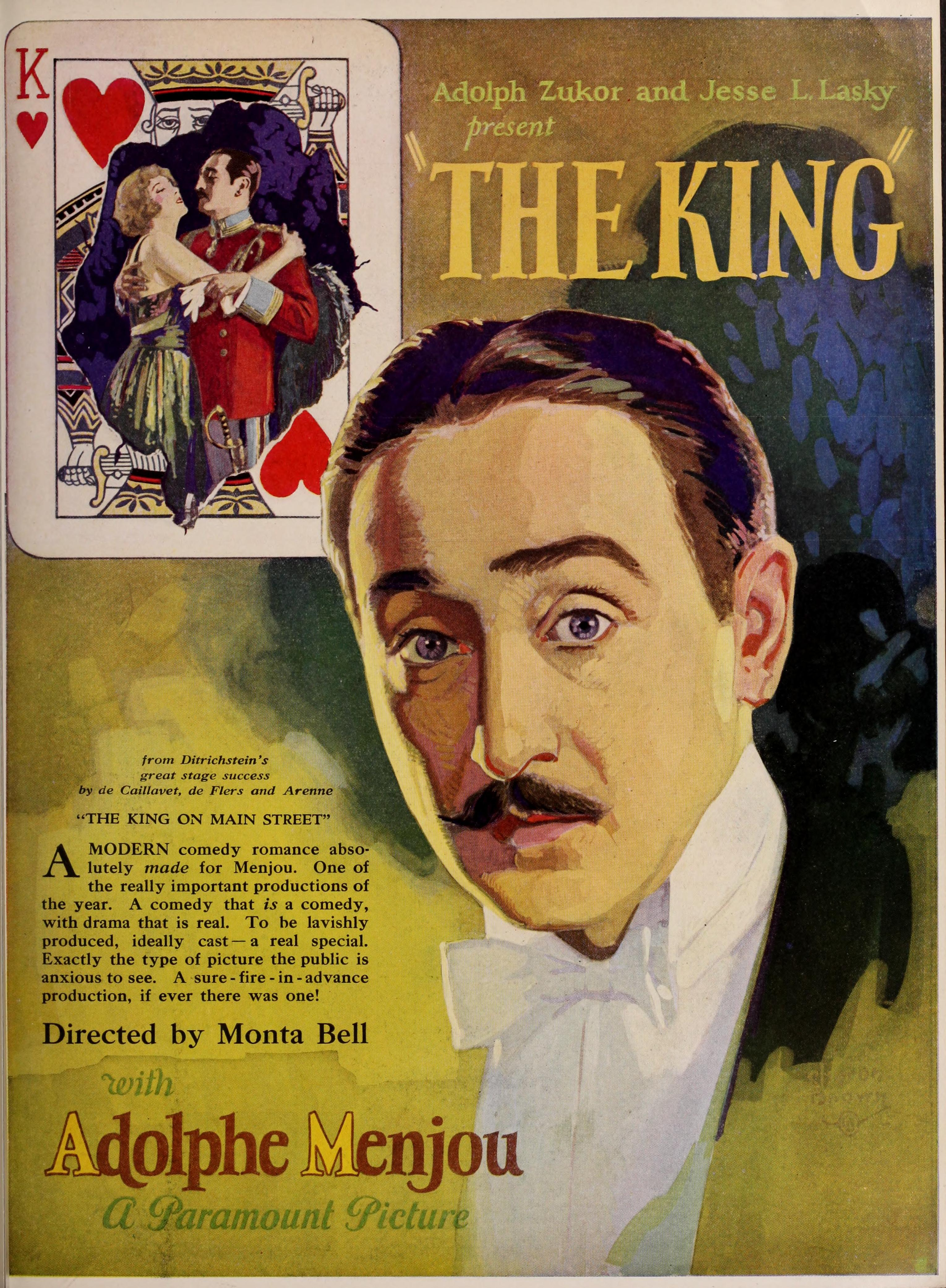
- Magazine advertisement
- Directed by: Monta Bell
- Written by: Monta Bell (adaptation); Douglas Zoty (scenario)
- Based on: The King (play) by Leo Ditrichstein; Le Roi (play) by Gaston Arman de Caillavet Robert de Flers Emmanuel Arène
- Produced by: Adolph Zukor; Jesse L. Lasky
- Starring: Adolphe Menjou; Bessie Love
- Cinematography: James Wong Howe
- Production company: Famous Players–Lasky
- Distributed by: Paramount Pictures
- Release date: October 25, 1925 (U.S.)
- Running time: 60 minutes
- Country: United States
- Language: Silent (English intertitles)

The King on Main Street, also known as The King, is a 1925 American silent romantic comedy film directed by Monta Bell and starring Adolphe Menjou and Bessie Love. The film was adapted for the screen by Bell and was based on the play The King, Leo Ditrichstein's adaptation of the 1908 French play Le Roi by Gaston Arman de Caillavet, Robert de Flers, and Emmanuel Arène. It was produced by Famous Players–Lasky and distributed by Paramount Pictures.

The King on Main Street includes two sequences filmed in early two-strip Technicolor. These sequences, along with a print of the film, still exist. The film is in the public domain and is available on the Internet Archive.

== Plot ==
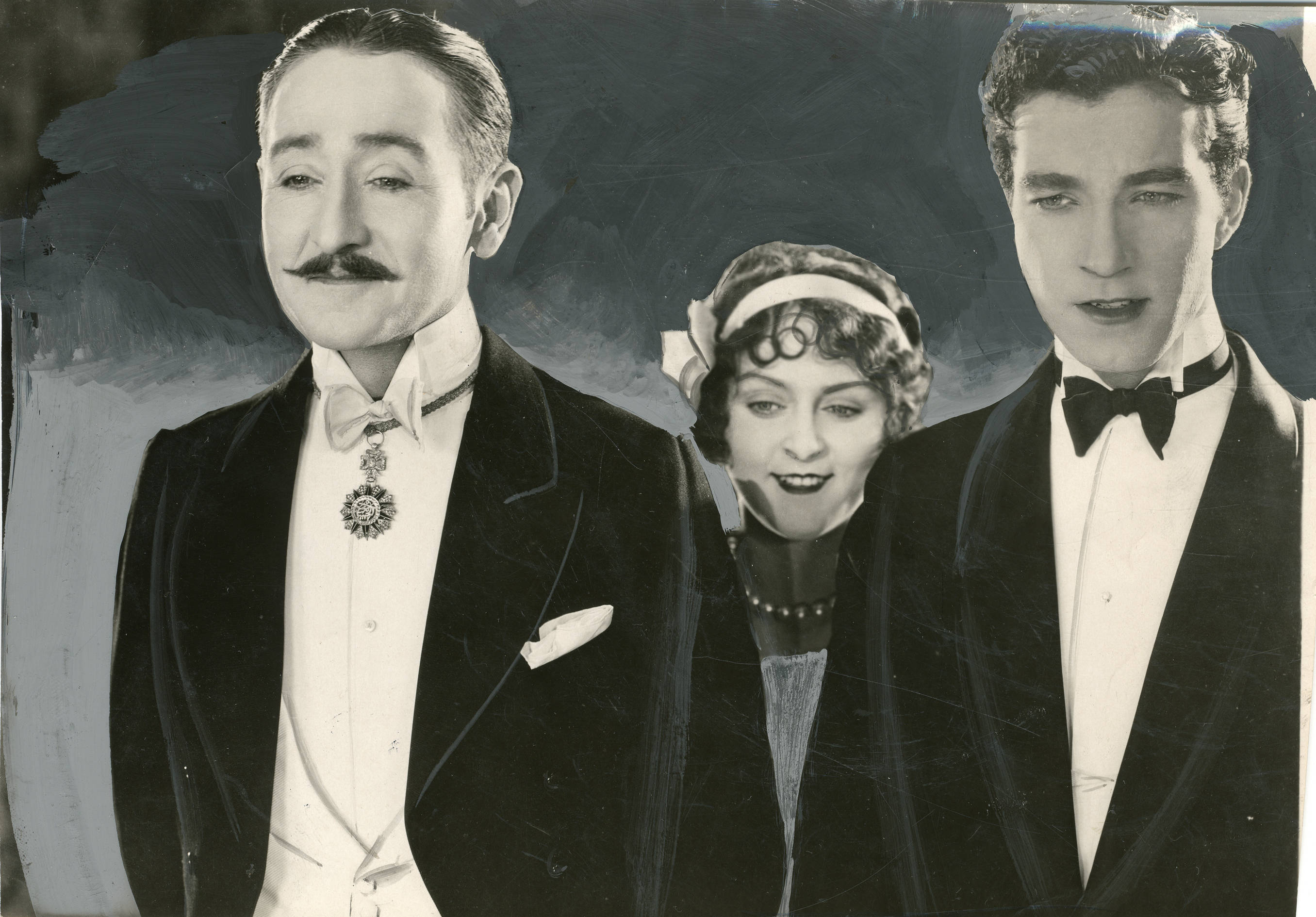
Adolphe Menjou, an unbilled performer, and Oscar Shaw in the film

King Serge IV of Molvania comes to Manhattan to conduct business with Arthur Trent, but instead goes to Coney Island, where he meets Gladys Humphreys and John Rockland. John, unaware of the king's royal identity, invites him to his home in Little Falls, New Jersey. The king falls in love with Gladys, but Trent catches them in a compromising situation and blackmails the king into completing their business deal. The king leaves the United States and Gladys forever.

== Cast ==
- Bessie Love as Gladys Humphreys
- Adolphe Menjou as King Serge IV of Molvania
- Greta Nissen as Therese Manix
- Oscar Shaw as John Rockland
- Joseph Kilgour as Arthur Trent
- Edgar Norton as Hugo Jensen
- Mario Majeroni as Count Krenko
- Carlotta Monterey as Mrs. Nash
- Marcia Harris as Aunt Tabitha Young
- Edouard Durand as Bourdier
- Lois Wilson as guest in lobby (uncredited)
- Jack La Rue as one of the king's servants in Paris (uncredited)

== Production ==
The film was partially filmed on location in New York, New Jersey, and Coney Island.

Bessie Love's performance of the Charleston in this film popularized the dance within the United States.

== Reception ==
The film did well at the box office, particularly in small-town America.

== See also ==
- List of early color feature films
