= Robinson i skärgården =

1920 film

- Directed by: Rune Carlsten
- Written by: Rune Carlsten; Sam Ask
- Starring: Eric Lindholm; Lotten Almlöf; Mary Johnson; Carlo Keil-Möller
- Cinematography: Raoul Reynols
- Distributed by: AB Svensk Filmindustri; Filmindustri AB Skandia
- Release date: November 15, 1920
- Running time: 49 minutes
- Country: Sweden
- Language: Swedish

Robinson i skärgården (Robinson in the Archipelago) is a Swedish silent film from 1920 directed by Rune Carlsten. Carlsten also wrote the script for the film together with Sam Ask. The animated intertitles in the film were created by Paul Myrén. Both the duplicate negative and the display copy of the film have been preserved. After appearing in the film, two of the actors, Mary Johnson and Einar Rød, decided to marry.

== Plot ==
The consul's widow Silverdahl owns a house in the Stockholm Archipelago. One of her daughters is newly married, and the other, Brita, is in love with the medical student Einar Falk. The mother prefers that Brita marry the fat banker Agathon. The newlyweds are going on a long sailing trip with Brita and Agathon. After a short journey, Einar is secretly taken aboard. Agathon becomes seasick and chooses to leave the company with Robinson Crusoe as his reading material. He lands on an uninhabited island, where he dreams that he is being chased by wild animals and other dreadful things just like the novel character himself. Agathon wakes up when he falls from a tree. He tries his best to make his existence on the island comfortable because he is unable to get away from it. Agathon's robinsonade becomes prolonged, and he takes on an increasingly wild appearance.

When the sailing group returns home after the long trip, they discover that Agathon has not arrived home as expected. A group of people come to the islet (where Agathon is marooned) to have a picnic. They read in the newspaper that an insane criminal has escaped from a nearby hospital. When Agathon appears in his Robinson Crusoe guise, they think he is this man. The group makes its way to Vaxholm, where it reports the incident to the police, who travel to the island to subdue the suspect. The police put a straitjacket on Agathon. He is taken to the hospital and received by Einar Falk, who has now completed his training as a doctor. The misunderstanding is cleared up. Agathon has had his fill of the matter and is satisfied with his fate, even though Brita chooses Einar as her fiancé.

== Cast ==
- Eric Lindholm as Agathon, a banker
- Lotten Almlöf as the consul's widow Silverdahl
- Mary Johnson as Brita, the unmarried daughter of the consul's widow
- Carlo Keil-Möller as Einar Falk, a medical student
- Einar Rød as the newlywed
- Sie Holmquist as the newlywed, Brita's sister
- Torsten Winge as a man in the sailing group

== Production ==
The film was shot in August and September 1920 at the Skandiaateljén studio in the Långängen neighborhood of Stocksund, Sweden and on Tobaksholmen in Vaxholm.
