= Semmy Friedmann =

Swedish actor

- Born: 14 September 1891; Kristianstad, Sweden
- Died: 13 January 1964 (aged 72); Stockholm, Sweden
- Occupation: Actor
- Years active: 1916-1963

Semmy Friedmann (14 September 1891 – 13 January 1964) was a Swedish actor. He had roles in multiple films between the years 1916 and 1963.

== Filmography ==
- Ålderdom och dårskap (1916) - Kaj
- Hans nåds testamente (1919) - Jacob
- A Fortune Hunter (1921) - Henri de Bresignac
- Thomas Graal's Ward (1922) - Student
- The People of Simlang Valley (1924) - Tattar-Jan
- Pettersson & Bendel (1933) - Josef Bendel
- Simon of Backabo (1934) - Dicke Lundén
- Kungen kommer (1936) - Italian pyrotechnist
- The Girls of Uppakra (1936) - Eric Dahlberg
- Dance, My Doll (1953) - Berg
- Den gula bilen (1963) - Ambassador Leclerc
