= The Mondesir Heir =

1940 film

- Film poster
- Directed by: Albert Valentin
- Written by: Jean Aurenche; Lucien Guidice; Pierre Bost
- Produced by: Raoul Ploquin; Dietrich von Theobald
- Starring: Fernandel; Elvire Popesco; Jules Berry
- Cinematography: Ekkehard Kyrath
- Edited by: Henri Taverna
- Music by: Georges Van Parys
- Production companies: L'Alliance Cinématographique Européenne; UFA
- Distributed by: L'Alliance Cinématographique Européenne
- Release date: 1 May 1940
- Running time: 102 minutes
- Countries: France; Germany
- Language: French

The Mondesir Heir (French: L'héritier des Mondésir) is a 1940 French-German comedy film directed by Albert Valentin and starring Fernandel, Elvire Popesco and Jules Berry. It was shot in Berlin by the German studio UFA in a co-production arrangement with its own French subsidiary ACE. Made before the Second World War broke out, it was the last of twenty one such productions.

== Cast ==
- Fernandel as Bienaimé de Mondésir, le baron de Mondésir & ses aïeux
- Elvire Popesco as Erika Axelos
- Jules Berry as Waldemar
- Gaby André as Janine Richard - La postière
- Monette Dinay as Rosette
- Jacques Derives as L'ordonnateur
- Yves Deniaud as Gaston
- Hugues Wanner as Lepetit
- Henri Beaulieu as Le colonel
- Lucien Dayle as Le notaire
- Marfa d'Hervilly as La cliente de Waldemer
- Fernand Flament as Martinot
- Frédéric Mariotti as Costecalde
- Edmond Ardisson as Justin - Le chauffeur
- Simone Gauthier as La première jeune fille du ciel
- Édouard Delmont as Firmin - Le majordome des Mondésir
- Tramel as Le curé
- Mathilde Alberti as Madame Cassard
- Bill Bocket as Le vitrier
- Jacques B. Brunius as Le médecin
- Ketti Dallan as Ginette
- Paul Denneville as Le marchand de cycles
- Marthe Derminy as Madame Février-Mars
- Drejac as Le fils du marchand
- Odile Dufay as Mademoiselle de Picoult
- Jacqueline Dufranne as Marguerite
- Suzy Flory as La commère
- Paul Fournier as Le bistro
- Sonia Gobar as Lucette
- Philippe Grey as Max
- Denise Helia as Gaby
- Elyane Herenguel as La deuxième jeune fille du ciel
- Anna Lefeuvrier as Irma
- Palmyre Levasseur as La patronne du bistro
- Jeanne Longuet as Raymonde
- Marcelly as L'épicière
- Jany Marsa as La voisine
- I. Mense as L'ami
- Auguste Mouriès as Quatrefages
- Léo Mouriès as Madame Costecalde
- Robert Ozanne as Petit rôle
- Roger Peter as Xavier
- Rocca as Le petit vieux
- André Saint-Germain as Chabernac
- Georges Serrano as Petit rôle
- Rita Stoya as Clara
- Solange Vallée as Mado
- Jacques Valois as Jimmy
- Ernest Varial as Le charron

== Bibliography ==
- Fiss, Karen. Grand Illusion: The Third Reich, the Paris Exposition, and the Cultural Seduction of France. University of Chicago Press, 2009.
