= La chanson de Fortunio =

Short opéra-comique in one act by Jacques Offenbach

Jacques Offenbach by Nadar, c. 1860s

La chanson de Fortunio (The Song of Fortunio) is a short opéra-comique in one act by Jacques Offenbach with a French libretto by Ludovic Halévy and Hector Crémieux. The music was composed within a week, with a further week being spent in preparations for the production. Its success was welcome after the failure of Barkouf a fortnight earlier.

Taken as a whole, this operetta has never formed part of what may be termed the standard repertoire, but despite this, and especially during the period prior to the First World War, the title song remained extremely popular as a recital item, and indeed the writer of Offenbach's obituary in The Times considered the song itself to be one of his best compositions along with Orpheus in the Underworld and La Grande-Duchesse de Gérolstein – with La belle Hélène following behind these "at some distance".

Offenbach had composed music for the song of Fortunio in act 2, scene 3, of Le Chandelier by Alfred de Musset for a revival of the play in 1850 at the Comédie-Française and this was published (by Heugel) as part of Offenbach's collection of songs Les Voix mystérieuses in 1853, and taken up enthusiastically by the tenor Gustave-Hippolyte Roger in his concerts. The librettists based their one-act La chanson de Fortunio around this song – with the story as a sort of sequel to the original play, the melody of the song being heard in the overture.

Messager composed an opera Fortunio (1907) based on the Musset play; Fortunio's song from that work was also set in Russian by Tchaikovsky as the first of his six Romances, Op. 28.

== Performance history ==
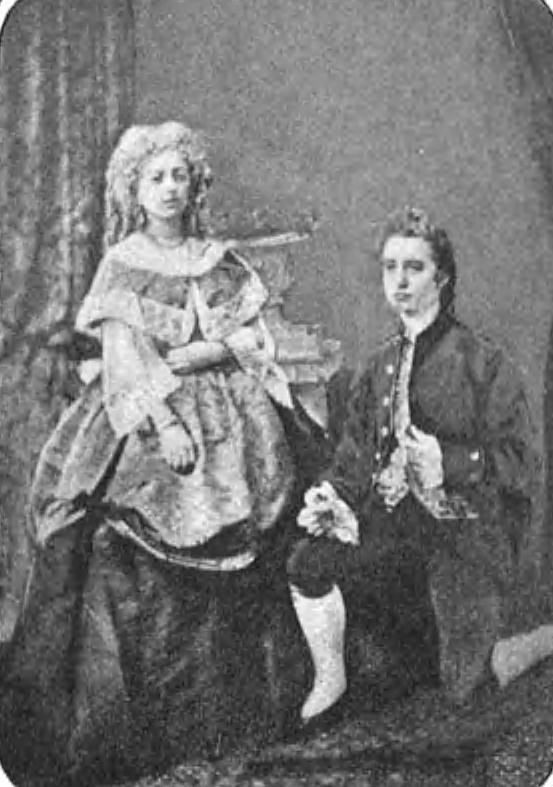
Valentin and Laurette, played by the actresses Gretchen Müller and Pauline Korolina Zerr

The first public performance of La chanson de Fortunio took place in the Salle Choiseul of the Théâtre des Bouffes-Parisiens, Paris, on 5 January 1861. Its premiere in Vienna was on 25 April and it continued to appear regularly on the bill in Paris during 1861 and 1862; it was presented in Germany in Bad Ems the following year.

The work was soon seen around Europe and beyond: Brussels and Berlin in 1861, Budapest, Prague, Graz and Stockholm in 1862, St Petersburg in 1864 (and 1905), New York and Basel in 1867, Milan in 1868 and London in 1871 (and 1907).

In 1979, the opera was revived in an English translation by Michael Geliot, by Welsh National Opera, who staged it at the Teatr y Werin in Aberystwyth, the Sir Thomas Picton School in Haverfordwest, the Teatr Gwynedd in Bangor, the Sherman Theatre in Cardiff, the Haymarket Theatre in Leicester, the Astra Theatre in Llandudno, and the Playhouse Theatre in Cheltenham. It formed the first part of an Offenbach double bill, the other half of the programme being M. Choufleuri restera chez lui le . . . (or, as it was advertised in English, Monsieur Colli-flahr's at Home).

It was recorded on Swedish television in 1981 with Gunnar Björnstrand as Maitre Fortunio.

The State Opera of South Australia presented the opera in 2015 on a double bill with Mozart's Bastien und Bastienne.

== Roles ==
| Role | Voice type | Premiere cast, 5 January 1861 (Conductor: Jacques Offenbach) |
|---|---|---|
| Fortunio, a lawyer | baritone | Désiré |
| Laurette, his wife | soprano | Marguerite Chabert |
| Landry, a clerk | soprano | Taffanel |
| Guillaume, a clerk | soprano | Rose-Deschamps |
| Saturnin, a clerk | soprano | Nordi |
| Sylvain, a clerk | soprano | Lecuver |
| Valentin, second clerk to Fortunio | soprano | Pfotzer |
| Babet, Fortunio's cook | mezzo | Baudoin |
| Friquet, a junior clerk | tenor | Debruille-Bache |

== Synopsis ==
Place: The garden of Fortunio's house in Lorraine
Time: Seventeenth century

Maître Fortunio, an elderly lawyer, is married to a young and attractive wife (Laurette).

Many years ago, when he was a young clerk, Fortunio had seduced the wife of his employer with the help of a particularly alluring song which he used as a means of charming her. Fortunio still recalls this episode, and he begins to suspect that his own young wife might be carrying on a clandestine affair. And indeed, his second clerk Valentin has fallen deeply in love with Laurette, although the young man's timidity has so far prevented him from declaring his passion.

Fortunio accuses his wife of infidelity and resolves to dismiss Valentin from his service. In the meantime, however, the clerks have discovered the old song, and when they begin to sing it, Fortunio realises that his hypocrisy has been exposed. The song has lost none of its efficacy, as is proved when all the clerks suddenly and miraculously acquire new girl friends.

== Musical numbers ==
- Overture
- Couplets de Laurette: "Prenez garde à vous"
- Ensemble du pain et des pommes: "Il est parti..."; Chanson à boire: "La belle eau claire"
- Couplets du petit Friquet
- Ronde des clercs: "Autrefois, aujourd'hui"
- Couplets de Valentin: "Je t'aime"
- Duo, ensemble, couplets; valse des clercs "Toutes les femmes sont à nous"
- Duo et chanson de Fortunio
- Scène final
