= Miquette (1934 film) =

1934 film

- Directed by: Henri Diamant-Berger; André Gillois; Henri Rollan
- Written by: Gaston Arman de Caillavet (play); Robert de Flers (play); Henri Diamant-Berger
- Produced by: Henri Diamant-Berger; Bernard Natan
- Starring: Blanche Montel; Michel Simon; Roland Toutain
- Cinematography: Maurice Desfassiaux
- Edited by: William Barache
- Music by: Jean Lenoir
- Production company: Films Diamant
- Distributed by: Pathé Consortium Cinéma
- Release date: 23 March 1934
- Running time: 75 minutes
- Country: France
- Language: French

Miquette (French: Miquette et sa mère) is a 1934 French comedy film directed by Henri Diamant-Berger and André Gillois and Henri Rollan. It stars Blanche Montel, Michel Simon and Roland Toutain. It is based on the 1906 play of the same name by Gaston Arman de Caillavet and Robert de Flers. Further adaptations were made in 1940 and 1950. The film's sets were designed by the art director Guy de Gastyne.

== Synopsis ==
Miquette, a young woman with theatrical ambitions, is tired of working in her mother's tobacconist in the provinces. She leaves for Paris to try and realise her dreams of stardom.

== Cast ==
- Blanche Montel as Miquette Grandier
- Michel Simon as Monchablon
- Roland Toutain as Urbain de la Tour Mirande
- Marcelle Monthil as Mme Monchablon
- Pauline Carton as Mlle Poche
- Marthe Mellot as Mlle Majoumel
- Lulu Vattier as Périne
- Serjius as L'impresario
- René Hiéronimus as L'auteur
- Robert Ozanne as Le contrôleur
- André Alerme as Le marquis Aldebert de la Tour Mirande
- Jeanne Cheirel as Madame Grandier
- Jacques Beauvais as Petit rôle
- Germaine Brédy
- Vyola Vareyne

== Bibliography ==
- Crisp, Colin. Genre, Myth and Convention in the French Cinema, 1929-1939. Indiana University Press, 2002.
