= Pettersson & Bendel =

1933 film by Per-Axel Branner

- Directed by: Per-Axel Branner
- Production company: Svensk Filmindustri
- Distributed by: Warner Bros.
- Release date: 1933
- Running time: 108 minutes
- Country: Sweden
- Language: Swedish

Pettersson & Bendel is a 1933 Swedish film directed by Per-Axel Branner.

== Plot ==
Josef Bendel, a stowaway from eastern Europe, sneaks into Sweden. He meets Karl-Johan Pettersson in Stockholm and the two unemployed men team up for moneymaking schemes.

== Cast ==
- Semmy Friedmann as Josef Bendel
- Adolf Jahr as Karl-Johan Pettersson

== Production ==
The film, based on Waldemar Hammenhög's book, was directed by Per-Axel Branner and produced by Svensk Filmindustri. It was heavily anti-Semitic.

== Release ==
The film was distributed by Warner Bros. in the United States and Europe. It premiered in the United States at the 55th Street Theatre in February 1934.

Hamer Verlag, an anti-Semitic publishing company, acquired the German distribution rights for the film. Violence against Jews broke out in Germany after the film was shown in Berlin in July 1935. It was dubbed for its German re-release in November 1938.

== Reception ==
Joseph Goebbels praised the film and designated it as politically worthwhile to the state, the first foreign film to receive it. Adolf Hitler mentioned the film in his speech announcing the Nuremberg Laws.

== Works cited ==
- Hull, David (1969). Film in the Third Reich: Art and Propaganda in Nazi Germany. Simon & Schuster. SBN 671214861.
- Niven, Bill (2018). Hitler and Film: The Führer's Hidden Passion. Yale University Press. ISBN 9780300200362.
- Waldman, Harry (2008). Nazi Films In America, 1933-1942. McFarland & Company. ISBN 9780786438617.
