= Henri Beaulieu =

French actor

Henri Beaulieu (1873 in Montargis – 1953) was a French stage and film actor, theatre managing director and author.

== Filmography ==
- 1927 : Napoléon by Abel Gance
- 1934: Vers l'abîme
- 1934 : Primerose by René Guissart
- 1935 : The Green Domino
- 1936 : Passé à vendre
- 1936 : Le Collier du grand duc
- 1938 : The Novel of Werther by Max Ophüls
- 1938 : The Little Thing
- 1939 : The Mondesir Heir by Albert Valentin
- 1940 : De Mayerling à Sarajevo by Max Ophüls

== Bibliography ==
- 1905 : Les théâtres du boulevard du Crime, Ed. H. Daragon
- La mise en scène et l'interprétation du répertoire classique, Revue d'art dramatique, 1906
