= Carlo Keil-Möller =

Swedish actor

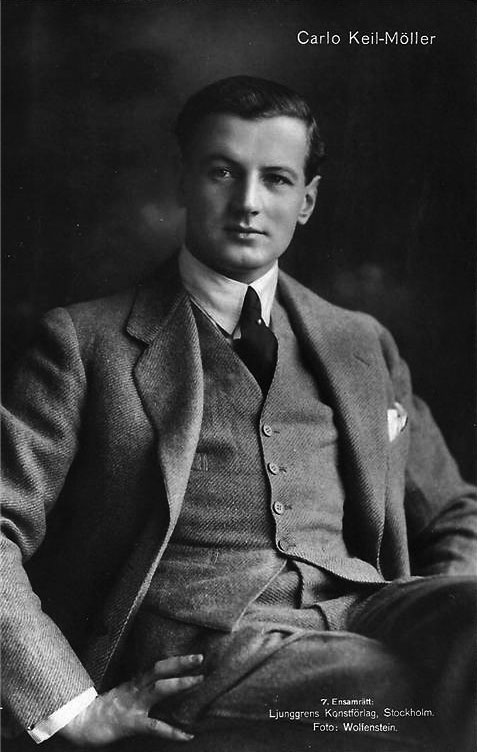
- Born: 8 December 1890; Örgryte, Sweden
- Died: 22 December 1958 (aged 68); Sövde, Sweden
- Occupations: Actor, writer, director
- Years active: 1915–1956

Carl Otto "Carlo" Keil-Möller (8 December 1890 – 22 December 1958) was a Swedish actor, writer and director. He was active both on stage and in films.

== Selected filmography ==
=== As actor ===
- Mästerkatten i stövlar (1918)
- Robinson i skärgården (1920)
- A Fortune Hunter (1921)
- A Maid Among Maids (1924)

=== As writer ===
- Human Destinies (1923)
- Johan Ulfstjerna (1923)
- Unge greven ta'r flickan och priset (1924)
- A Maid Among Maids (1924)
- Adventure (1936)
- A Crime (1940)

=== As director ===
- En flicka kommer till sta'n (1937)
