= Papacito lindo =

- Directed by: Fernando de Fuentes
- Written by: Gaston Arman de Caillavet (play Miquette et sa mère); Robert de Flers (play Miquette et sa mère)
- Produced by: Fernando de Fuentes
- Starring: Sara García, Fernando Soler, Julián Soler, Manuel Noriega and Manolita Saval
- Cinematography: Gabriel Figueroa
- Production company: Compañía Mexicana de Películas
- Distributed by: Azteca Film Distribution Company
- Release date: September 7, 1939
- Running time: 114 minutes
- Country: Mexico
- Language: Spanish

Papacito lindo (Handsome Sweet Daddy or Sugar Daddy) is a 1939 Mexican film directed by Fernando de Fuentes. The film stars Sara García, Fernando Soler, Julián Soler, Manuel Noriega and Manolita Saval.

It is an adaptation of Miquette et sa mère, a French play by the aristocrat Robert de Flers.

The film was well-received in the United States and was cited as an important production of the Mexican film industry.

== Premise ==
A beautiful Valencian girl comes with her teacher to Mexico to make her film debut in a film called El Capitán Aventurero.

== Cast ==
- Sara García as Remedios
- Fernando Soler as Wilfredo Gómez de la Reguera
- Julián Soler as Jorge
- Manuel Noriega as Don Eustaquio
- Manolita Saval as Paquita Moreno
- Rafael Icardo as Francisco Reina
- Aurora Ruiz as Lupe
- Antonio Bravo as Luis, the valet
- Armando Velasco as the Inspector
- Raúl Guerrero as the film director
- Crox Alvarado as the film's heartthrob
- Humberto Rodríguez as the gardener
- Jorge Marrón as the announcer

== Themes ==
In the book On the Border: Society and Culture between the United States and Mexico (2004), it is noted that in changing times in Mexico in the 1930s, with the middle-class setting new moral standards, the film stands out for "rescuing old patriarchal Catholic values of female chastity and loyalty to a family hierarchy".

== Release and reception ==
The film premiered on 7 September 1939 at the Cine Palacio in Mexico City.

A contemporary commentator in Cine-Mundial wrote: "[In Papacito Lindo] Cosmopolitanism reigns supreme. The theme is of French origin, although the dialogue, written by Fuentes himself, has its own flavor. Another bold idea was to give the lead role to a singer." Teatro al dia indicated that the film had been well-received in the United States and was an important production of the Mexican film industry.

Raúl Miranda in Corre camera considered that Papacito lindo is one of the films where de Fuentes demonstrates his ability to understand the popular taste of the time.
