= The Beautiful Adventure (1917 film) =

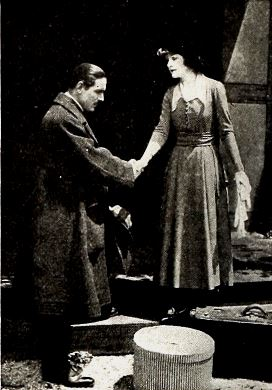
- Still with Powell and Murdock
- Directed by: Dell Henderson
- Written by: Joseph F. Poland (scenario)
- Based on: The Beautiful Adventure by: Gaston Arman de Caillavet; Robert de Flers and Étienne Rey
- Produced by: Charles Frohman
- Starring: Ann Murdock
- Cinematography: Frank Bangs
- Production company: Empire All Star Corp.
- Distributed by: Mutual Film
- Release date: October 15, 1917
- Running time: 5-6 reels
- Country: United States
- Language: Silent (English intertitles)

The Beautiful Adventure is a 1917 American silent drama film starring Ann Murdock, a stage star. The film is based on the 1913 Broadway stage play The Beautiful Adventure in which Murdock had starred. The film was directed by Dell Henderson and released through the Mutual Film company. It is a lost film.

== Plot ==
As described in a film magazine, Andre D'Eguzon and Helen De Travillac are in love, but the mother of Andre, Countess D'Eguzon, interferes and brings about the engagement of Helen to Valentine Borroyer, who makes a diary note of every event. On the morning of the wedding Andre goes to Helen and pleads with her not to marry Valentine. Helen tears off her wedding veil and flees with Andre to the home of her grandmother. They find themselves in many compromising situations as the grandmother believes that they are husband and wife. Helen gets Valentine to tell Andre's mother that he does not love Helen and that Helen and Andre should marry. And they do.

== Cast ==
- Ann Murdock as Helen De Travillac
- Ada Boshell as Madame De Travillac
- Edward Fielding as Count Michael D'Eguzon
- David Powell as Andre, his son
- Kate Sergeantson as The Countess D'Eguzon
- Edgar Norton as Valentine Borroyer
- Carl Sauerman as Jacques Sequrin (credited as Carl Sauermann)
- Vera Fuller Mellish as Jeahne
- Merceita Esmond as Jeantine
- Anton Ascher as Gaston
- Victor Le Roy as Pierre
- Robert Entwistle as Doctor

== See also ==
- The Beautiful Adventure (1932, German)
- The Beautiful Adventure (1932, French)
- The Beautiful Adventure (1942)
