= Miquette (1950 film) =

1950 film

- Directed by: Henri-Georges Clouzot
- Screenplay by: Jean Ferry; Henri-Georges Clouzot
- Based on: Miquette et sa mere by Robert de Flers & Gaston Arman de Caillavet
- Produced by: Raymond Borderie; Robert Dorfmann; Paul-Edmond Decharme
- Starring: Louis Jouvet; Bourvil; Saturnin Fabre; Danièle Delorme
- Cinematography: Louis Née; Armand Thirard
- Edited by: Monique Kirsanoff
- Music by: Albert Lasry
- Production company: Compagnie Industrielle et Commerciale Cinématographique
- Distributed by: Les Films Corona
- Release date: 14 April 1950
- Running time: 95 minutes
- Country: France
- Language: French
- Box office: 2,159,279 admissions (France)

Danièle Delorme and Bourvil

Miquette (French: Miquette et sa mère) is a 1950 French comedy film directed by Henri-Georges Clouzot and starring Louis Jouvet, Bourvil and Saturnin Fabre. The film was an adaptation of the play Miquette et sa mere by Robert de Flers and Gaston Arman de Caillavet, which had previously been adapted into 1934 and 1940 films. The film is set around the turn-of-the century.

It was shot at the Joinville Studios in Paris. The film's sets were designed by the art director Georges Wakhevitch. Clouzot was reluctant to make the film, but was contractually obliged to. It was not a commercial or critical success.

The film was Clouzot's only attempt at making a comedy.

== Partial cast ==
- Louis Jouvet as Monchablon
- Bourvil as Urbain de la Tour-Mirande
- Saturnin Fabre as Le marquis
- Danièle Delorme as Miquette
- Mireille Perrey as Madame veuve Hermine Grandier
- Pauline Carton as Perrine
- Jeanne Fusier-Gir as Mademoiselle Poche
- Madeleine Suffel as Noémie
- Maurice Schutz as Panouillard
- Pierre Olaf as Le jeune premier
- Paul Barge as L'abbé

== Bibliography ==
- Lloyd, Christopher. Henri-Georges Clouzot. Manchester University Press, 2007.
