= The Beautiful Adventure (1932 French-language film) =

1932 film

- Directed by: Reinhold Schünzel; Roger Le Bon
- Written by: Robert de Flers (play); Étienne Rey (play); Gaston Arman de Caillavet (play); Emeric Pressburger
- Produced by: Günther Stapenhorst
- Starring: Käthe von Nagy; Jean Périer; Paule Andral; Daniel Lecourtois
- Cinematography: Robert Baberske; Fritz Arno Wagner
- Edited by: Eduard von Borsody
- Music by: Hans-Otto Borgmann; Ralph Erwin
- Production company: UFA
- Distributed by: L'Alliance Cinématographique Européenne
- Release date: 18 October 1932
- Running time: 80 minutes
- Country: Germany
- Language: French

The Beautiful Adventure (French: La belle aventure) is a 1932 German French-language romantic comedy film directed by Roger Le Bon and Reinhold Schünzel and starring Jean Périer, Paule Andral and Daniel Lecourtois. It is a French-language version of the German film The Beautiful Adventure. As was common at the time, the two films were shot in completely different versions with major changes to the cast and some scenes.

== Plot ==
On her wedding day, a young bride takes off with her cousin, who she has always loved.

== Cast ==
- Jean Périer as Count d'Eguzon
- Paule Andral as Countess d'Eguzon
- Daniel Lecourtois as André, their son
- Käthe von Nagy as Hélène de Trevillac
- Lucien Baroux as Valentin Le Barroyer
- Marie-Laure as Grandmother
- Jeanne Provost as Madame Serignan
- Adrien Le Gallo as Monsieur Chartrain
- Renée Fleury as Madame Chartrain
- Mauricet as Monsieur Desmignières
- Arletty as Madame Desmignières
- Charles Lorrain as Monsieur Dubois
- Robert Goupil as The detective
- Michèle Alfa as Jeanne
- Georges Deneubourg as Dr. Pinbrache
- Lucien Callamand as Didier
- Marguerite Templey as Jeantine
- Paul Ollivier as Railway president
- Véra Pharès as Little girl

== See also ==
- The Beautiful Adventure (1917)
- The Beautiful Adventure (1942)

== Bibliography ==
- Kreimeier, Klaus (1999). The Ufa Story: A History of Germany's Greatest Film Company, 1918–1945. Berkeley: University of California Press. ISBN 978-0-520-22069-0.
