= Primerose =

1934 film

- Directed by: René Guissart
- Written by: Henri Falk
- Based on: Primerose by Robert de Flers and Gaston Armand de Caillavet
- Produced by: Edmond Pingrin
- Starring: Madeleine Renaud; Henri Rollan; Marguerite Moreno
- Cinematography: René Colas; André Thomas
- Edited by: André Versein
- Music by: Marcel Lattès
- Production company: Films Sonores Tobis
- Distributed by: Films Sonores Tobis
- Release date: 23 February 1934
- Running time: 80 minutes
- Country: France
- Language: French

Primerose is a 1934 French drama film directed by René Guissart and starring Madeleine Renaud, Henri Rollan and Marguerite Moreno. It was produced by the French subsidiary of the German company Tobis Film at the Epinay Studios in Paris. The film's sets were designed by the art director Lazare Meerson.

== Cast ==
- Madeleine Renaud as Primerose
- Henri Rollan as Pierre de Lancey
- Marguerite Moreno as Mme de Sermaize
- Georges Mauloy as Le cardinal de Mérance
- Renée Dennsy as Donatienne
- Pierre Moreno as Le facteur amoureux
- Henri Beaulieu as Le comte de Plélan
- Nadine Picard as La mondaine
- Lucienne Parizet as La divorcée
- Katia Lova as Une parente

== Bibliography ==
- Bessy, Maurice & Chirat, Raymond. Histoire du cinéma français: 1929-1934. Pygmalion, 1988.
- Crisp, Colin. Genre, Myth and Convention in the French Cinema, 1929-1939. Indiana University Press, 2002.
- Goble, Alan. The Complete Index to Literary Sources in Film. Walter de Gruyter, 1999.
- Rège, Philippe. Encyclopedia of French Film Directors, Volume 1. Scarecrow Press, 2009.
