= Roger Le Bon =

French film producer and film director (1891-1956)

- Born: 29 September 1891; Angers, France
- Died: 19 February 1956 (aged 64); Paris, France
- Occupations: Producer, Director
- Years active: 1924 – 1953 (film)

Roger Le Bon (1891–1956) was a French film producer and director. Le Bon co-directed a number of French-language versions of films made by the German studio UFA. In 1932 he co-directed the crime thriller Narcotics.

== Selected filmography ==
- The Girl and the Boy (1931)
- Ronny (1931)
- Narcotics (1932)
- The Beautiful Adventure (1932)
- George and Georgette (1934)
- The Decoy (1935)

== Bibliography ==
- Youngkin, Stephen. The Lost One: A Life of Peter Lorre. University Press of Kentucky, 2005.
