= Étienne Rey =

French writer, dramatist and literary critic (1879–1965)

Étienne Rey (1 March 1879 – 16 February 1965) was a French writer, dramatist and literary critic and one of the first best-seller writers of the Grasset publisher.

His play La belle aventure, co-written with Robert de Flers and Gaston Arman de Caillavet was premiered in 1913 at the Théâtre du Vaudeville, and played again numerous times. It has been adapted to the screen in 1917, 1932 and 1942 under the title The Beautiful Adventure.

== Works ==
- 1911: Sous la Lumière rouge, drama in 3 acts
- 1912: La renaissance de l'orgueil français, Ed. Grasset
- 1913: La belle aventure: comedy in three acts (with Gaston Arman de Caillavet and Robert de Flers), performed at the Théâtre de l'Odéon in 1927 and 1949
- 1924: Ce que femme veut: comedy in three acts
- 1925: Éloge du mensonge, Ed. Hachette
- 1926: Le Livre de Stendhal sur l'amour
- 1929: La Vie amoureuse de Berlioz, Ed. Flammarion
