= Le Chandelier =

1835 play by Alfred de Musset

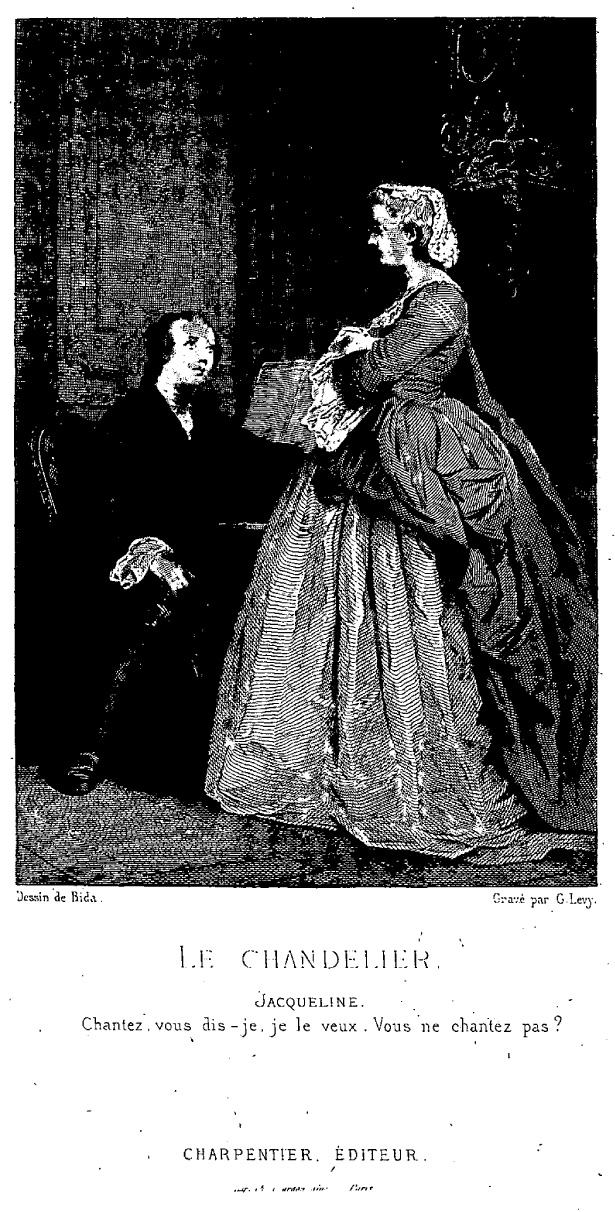
Illustration from an early edition of Le Chandelier

Le Chandelier (French pronunciation: [lə ʃɑ̃dəlje]) is an 1835 play in three acts by French dramatist Alfred de Musset.

The play was first published in 1835 in Revue des deux Mondes. It was first staged at the Théâtre Historique in August 1848 with Mademoiselle Maillet as Jacqueline. In October 1850, it was produced at the Comédie-Française with a cast including Delaunay as Fortunio and Allan as Jacqueline. In October 1850, the interior minister Léon Faucher had the work banned, a decision confirmed in subsequent seasons.

Jacques Offenbach, who wrote incidental music for the Comédie-Française production, made a sequel entitled La chanson de Fortunio. An opera of 1907 by André Messager, Fortunio, was based closely on the play.
