= The Beautiful Adventure (1942 film) =

1942 film

- Directed by: Marc Allégret
- Written by: Étienne Rey (play); Robert de Flers (play); Gaston Arman de Caillavet (play); Jean Bernard-Luc; Georges Neveux; Marcel Achard
- Starring: Claude Dauphin; Micheline Presle; Louis Jourdan
- Cinematography: Léonce-Henri Burel
- Edited by: Henri Taverna
- Music by: Georges Auric
- Production company: Les Films Impéria
- Distributed by: Les Films Impéria
- Release date: 20 December 1942
- Running time: 92 minutes
- Country: France
- Language: French

The Beautiful Adventure (French: La Belle aventure) is a 1942 French romantic comedy film directed by Marc Allégret and starring Claude Dauphin, Micheline Presle and Louis Jourdan. It is based on 1913 play of the same name by Gaston Arman de Caillavet, Robert de Flers and Étienne Rey. It was shot at the Victorine Studios in Nice. The film's sets were designed by the art director Paul Bertrand.

== Plot ==
On her wedding day, a young bride takes off with her cousin, who she has always loved.

== Cast ==
- Claude Dauphin as Valentin Le Barroyer
- Micheline Presle as Françoise Pimbrache
- Louis Jourdan as André d'Éguzon
- Gisèle Pascal as Hélène de Trévillac
- Suzanne Dehelly as Madame d'Éguzon
- André Brunot as Le comte d'Éguzon
- Berthe Bovy as Madame de Trévillac
- Jean Aquistapace as L'oncle
- Pauline Carton as Jeantine
- Géo Dorlys as Fouque
- Danièle Delorme as Monique
- Lucien Brulé as Le curé
- Charlotte Clasis as La tante
- Allain Dhurtal as Le docteur Pimbrache

== Production ==
The film was shot in September–October 1942 in Nice. However it was not released until after the Liberation of France due to the ban on the films of Claude Dauphin after he joined the Free French.

== See also ==
- The Beautiful Adventure (1917)
- The Beautiful Adventure (1932, German)
- The Beautiful Adventure (1932, French)
