= Monta Bell =

American film producer, film director, and screenwriter (1891–1958)

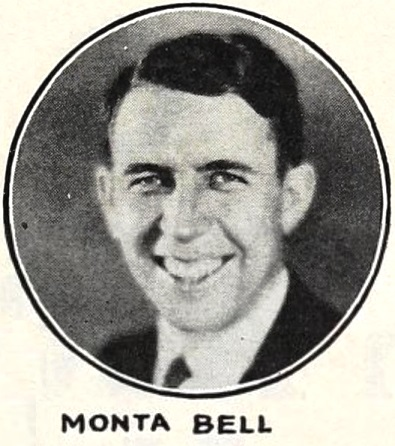
- From a 1925 magazine
- Born: Louis Monta Bell; February 5, 1891; Washington D.C., U.S.
- Died: February 4, 1958 (aged 66); Motion Picture Country House and Hospital, U.S.
- Years active: 1925 - 1942
- Spouse: Betty Lawford (1931-1937)

Louis Monta Bell (February 5, 1891 – February 4, 1958) was an American film director, producer, and screenwriter.

== Biography ==
“Completely forgotten today, Monta Bell was once seen as a major stylist working in the Lubitsch tradition, although the sly misanthropy of his best work, like Man, Woman and Sin (1927) or Downstairs (1932), is far more suggestive of Charles Chaplin’s darker moments— Film historian Richard Koszarski in Hollywood on the Hudson (2008).

Monta Bell was born in Washington, D.C. He enrolled in District of Columbia Public Schools graduating from Eastern High School. He first appeared in theatrical venues with Washington D.C. stock companies, including organizing the original Garrick Players and producing at the Garrick Theater in Washington. He then took up journalism and publishing in New York, after he had been a reporter and editor at The Washington Herald. While in New York, filmmaker Charlie Chaplin enlisted the 32-year-old Bell to ghost-write his 1922 memoir My Trip Abroad. Bell, along a number of other apprentices including Harry d'Abbadie d'Arrast and Mal St. Clair, became film editors and assistant directors. Here Bell was “exposed to Chaplin’s meticulous style of comedy construction and a complete immersion in all aspects of filmmaking.”

In 1924, Paramount manager Walter Wanger engaged a number of “promising young men without significant directing experience”, among them Bell, to direct pictures at their Astoria Studios, Queens, New York. One of Bell’s early achievements as director is The King on Main Street (1925). Bell developed into a major cinematic stylist, directing sophisticated film essays on “contemporary sexual mores.” Bell is notable for directing the 1926 Torrent, Greta Garbo's first American film.

In 1928, with the advent of sound films, Bell was transferred Paramount Pictures’ east coast operations, serving as head of production at the Astoria Studios. There Bell directed a number of high comedies and low melodramas and later moved to producing films,

Like his mentor Charles Chaplin, Bell championed the superiority of silent cinema as an art form and a method of conveying a story.

Monta directed 20 films from 1924 to 1945. In addition, he produced 20 films and wrote 9 screenplays.

== Personal life and death ==
Monta Bell and Lucille Marie Bell were married in Annapolis, Maryland, on May 3, 1910. She sued for divorce in December 1931. They had a daughter. He married actress Betty Lawford in New York City on December 23, 1931. They were divorced in 1937 in Mexico.

He died on February 4, 1958, at the Motion Picture Country House and Hospital, one day before his 67th birthday. He is interred in Section 8 Garden of Legends in the Hollywood Forever Cemetery, Hollywood, California.

== Filmography ==
“At the time I came East [to Astoria Studios] I did not like talking pictures. I do not like them today. This, however, is personal taste. I do not know whether the public likes them or not. I do not believe any one can tell that, because the public is just being fed talking pictures and as long as that is their enforced diet, they are going to take it.
If one [film] company had the courage - perhaps it would have taken a very rash courage - to hold aloof from the hysteria that [introduced talking films] so rapidly, to produce only silent films that year... they might have found considerable market for these same silent films. However, that is past. Talking pictures are here and here to stay.” —Monta Bell in Theatre Arts Monthly, September, 1929.

Year	Title	Director	Writer	Producer
1924	Broadway After Dark	Yes	No	No
1924	The Snob	Yes	Yes	No
1925	Lady of the Night	Yes	No	No
1925	Pretty Ladies	Yes	No	No
1925	The King on Main Street	Yes	Adaptation	No
1925	Lights of Old Broadway	Yes	No	No
1926	Torrent	Uncredited	No	No
1926	The Boy Friend	Yes	No	Yes
1926	Upstage	Yes	No	No
1927	After Midnight	Yes	Story	No
1927	Man, Woman and Sin	Yes	Story	No
1929	The Letter	No	No	Yes
1929	Gentlemen of the Press	No	No	Yes
1929	Applause	No	No	Yes
1929	The Bellamy Trial	Yes	Yes	No
1929	The Battle of Paris	No	No	Yes
1930	Behind the Make-Up	No	No	Yes
1930	Young Man of Manhattan	Yes	No	Yes
1930	The Big Pond	No	No	Yes
1930	Laughter	No	No	Yes
1930	East Is West	Yes	No	Co-producer
1932	Downstairs	Yes	No	Yes
1933	The Worst Woman in Paris?	Yes	Yes	No
1934	Men in White	No	No	Yes
1934	Student Tour	No	No	Yes
1941	West Point of the Air	No	No	Yes
1941	Aloma of the South Seas	No	No	Yes
1941	Birth of the Blues	No	No	Yes
1945	China's Little Devils	Yes	No	No

Uncredited actor

- The Adventurer (1917, Short) - Man
- The Pilgrim (1923) - Policeman

== Sources ==
- Koszarski, Richard. 1976. Hollywood Directors: 1914-1940. Oxford University Press. Library of Congress Catalog Number: 76-9262.
- Koszarski, Richard. 2008. Hollywood on the Hudson: Film and Television in New York from Griffith to Sarnoff. Rutgers University Press. ISBN 978-0-8135-4293-5
