= Per-Axel Branner =

Swedish actor, screenwriter and film director

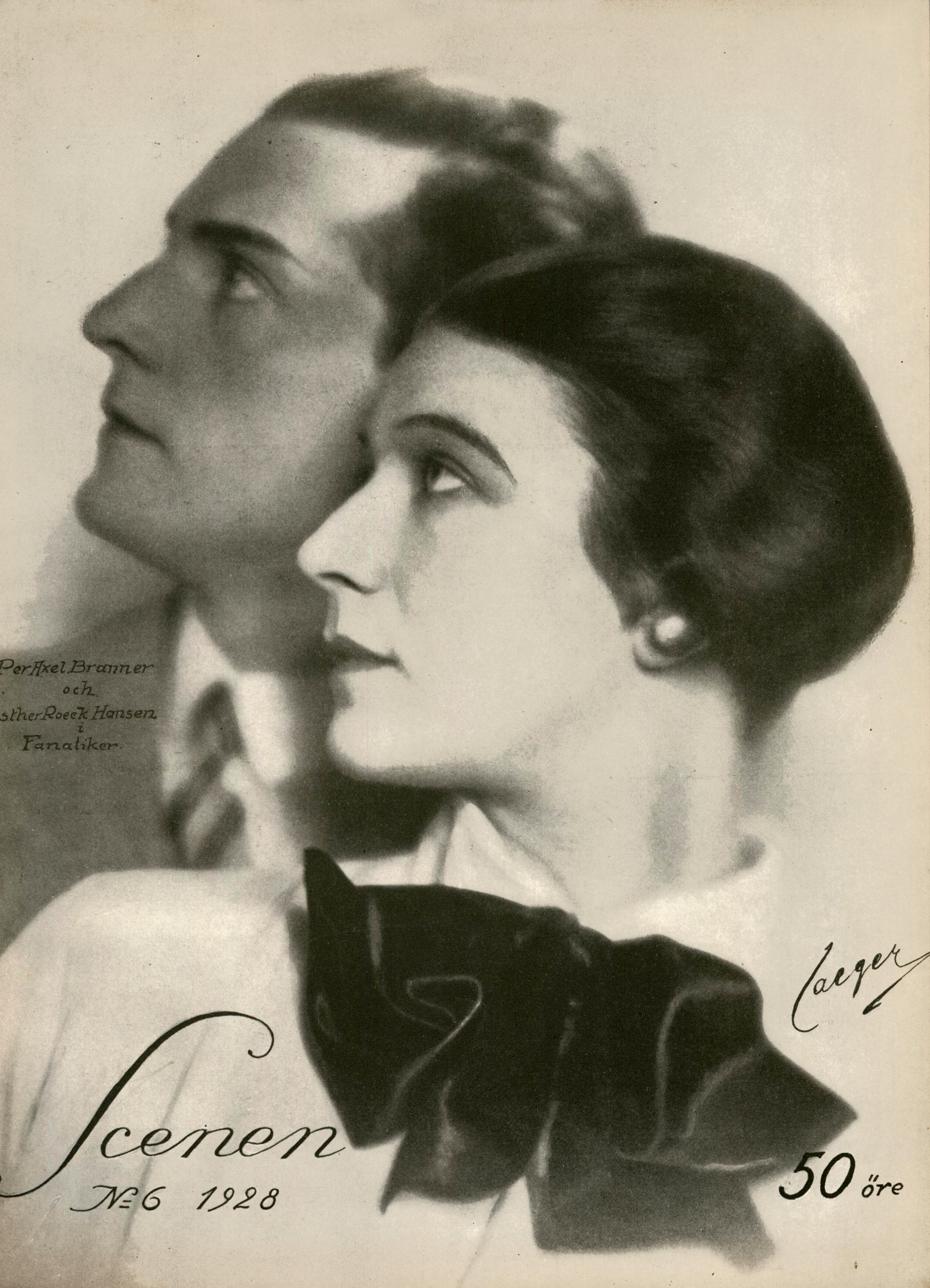
- In 1928 with actress Ester Roeck-Hansen
- Born: Per-Axel Helge Larsson; 25 January 1899; Linköping, Sweden
- Died: 31 July 1975 (aged 76); Lidingö, Sweden
- Occupations: Actor, director, scriptwriter and theater director
- Years active: 1926–1966 (film)
- Spouse: Gunn Wållgren (m. 1954–1975)

Per-Axel Helge Branner (né Larsson; 25 January 1899 – 31 July 1975) was a Swedish actor, screenwriter and film director.

== Selected filmography ==
- Getting Married (1926)
- His Life's Match (1932)
- Pettersson & Bendel (1933)
- Man's Way with Women (1934)
- Adventure (1936)
- Conflict (1937)
- A Cruise in the Albertina (1938)
- She Thought It Was Him (1943)

== Bibliography ==
- Qvist, Per Olov & von Bagh, Peter. Guide to the Cinema of Sweden and Finland. Greenwood Publishing Group, 2000.
