= Robert de Flers =

French playwright, opera librettist, and journalist

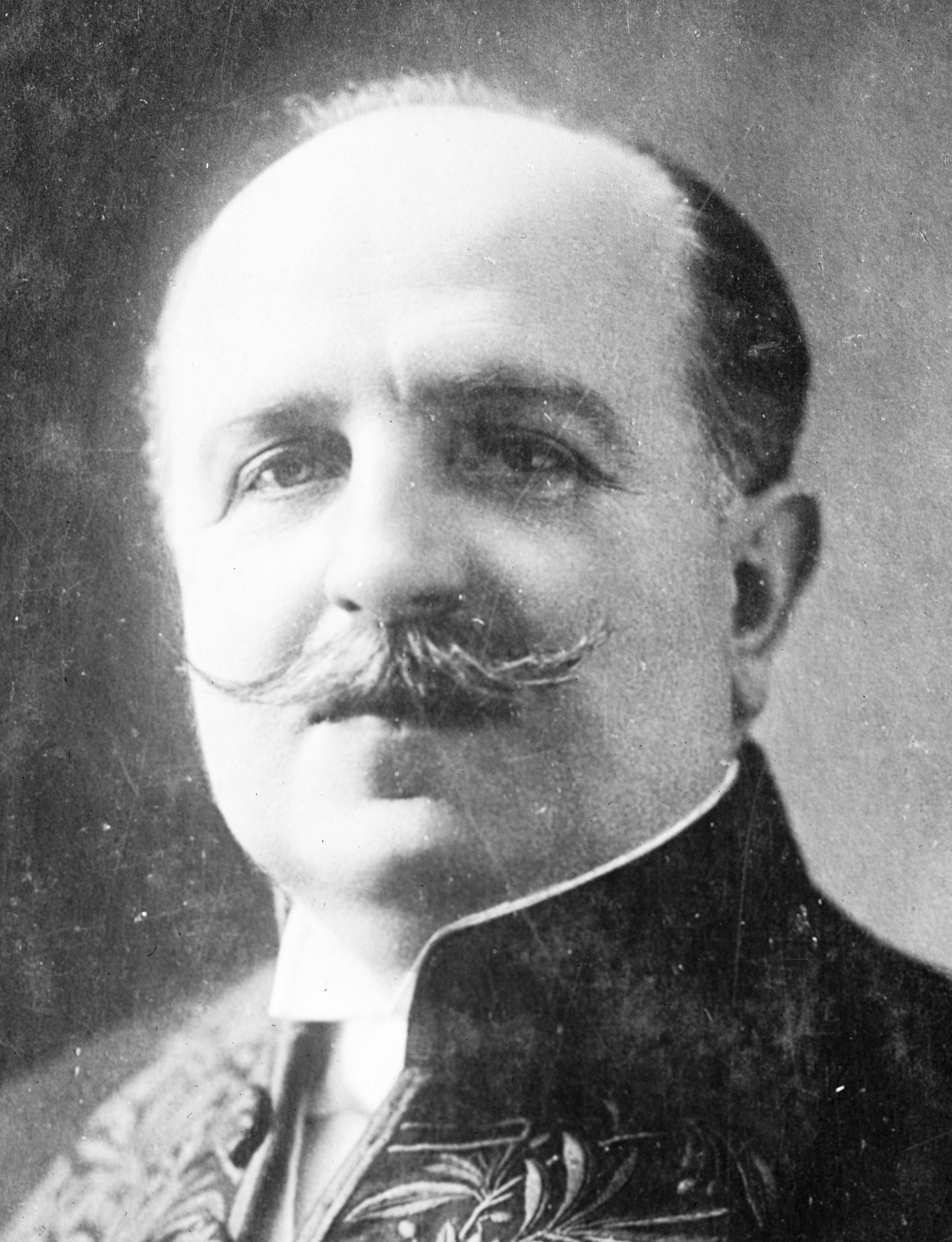
Robert de Flers

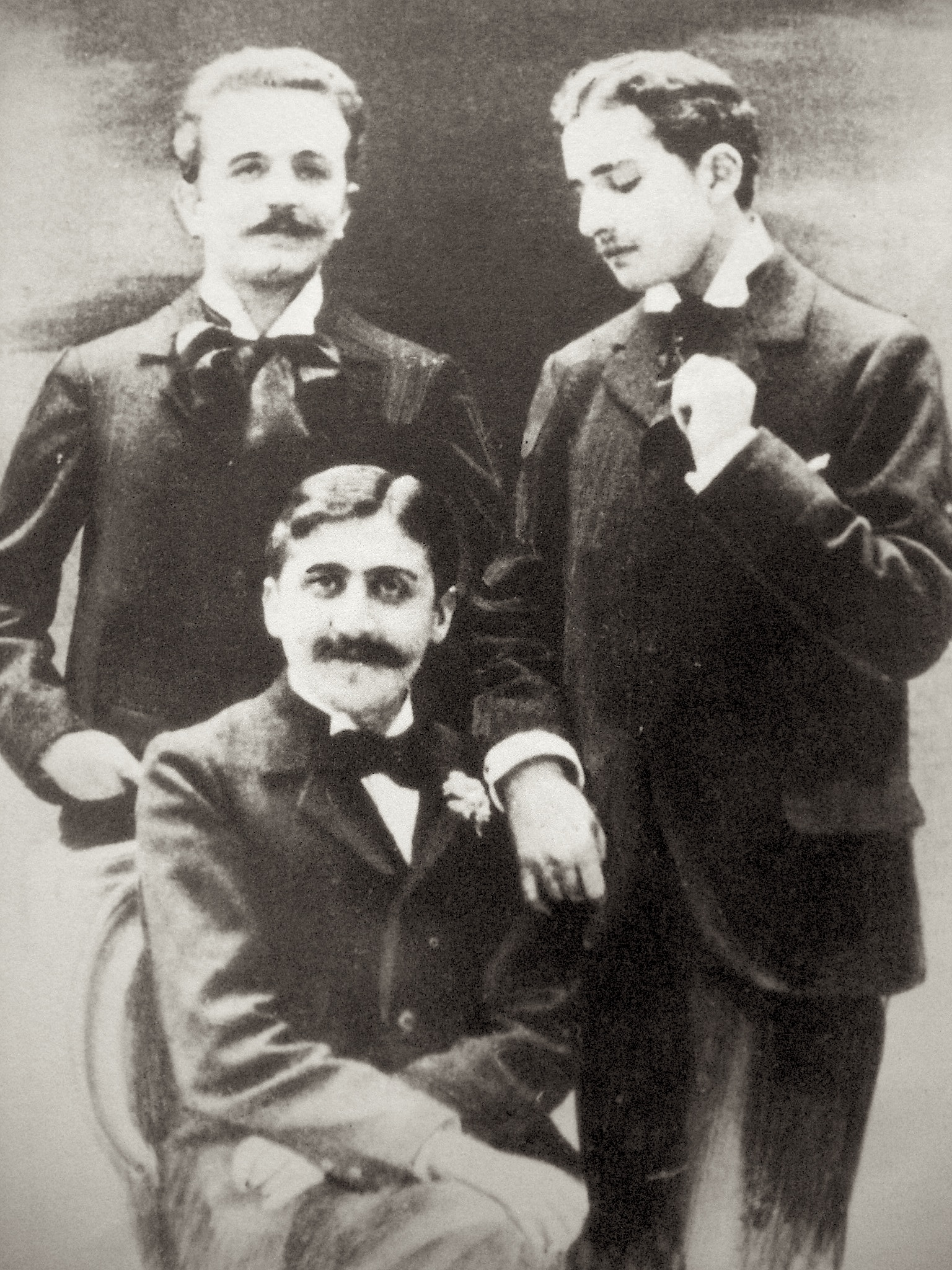
Marcel Proust (seated), Robert de Flers (left), and Lucien Daudet (right), ca. 1894

Robert Pellevé de La Motte-Ango, marquis de Flers (25 November 1872, Pont-l'Évêque, Calvados – 30 July 1927, Vittel) was a French playwright, opera librettist, and journalist.

== Biography ==
He entered the Lycée Condorcet in 1888 where he studied law with the initial ambition of entering diplomatic service. He met and befriended fellow student and writer Marcel Proust, and that relationship had a great influence upon him. Proust exposed Flers to art, literature, and music and his interests soon switched from law to writing, journalism, and literature. The two men enjoyed a lifelong friendship.

After completing his studies, he toured throughout Asia in the mid-1890s. The event inspired his earliest writings: the novel La Courtisane Taïa et son singe vert (1896), the short story Ilsée, princesse de Tripoli (1896), and the travel narrative Vers l’Orient (1897). Upon returning to Paris, he was approached by composer Edmond Audran to write the libretto for his operetta La reine des reines. The worked premiered on 14 October 1896 at the Théâtre de l'Eldorado in Strasbourg. His next libretto was for Gaston Serpette's vaudeville-operetta Shakspeare! which premiered at the Théâtre des Bouffes Parisiens on 23 November 1899.

In 1901 de Flers married Geneviève Sardou, the daughter of Victorien Sardou. He continued to be active writing librettos. His third opera libretto, Les travaux d'Hercule (1901), marked his first collaboration with fellow playwright Gaston Arman de Caillavet and composer Claude Terrasse. Most of his remaining librettos were written with Caillavet, often for Terrasse who was their most frequent musical collaborator. Other composers for which the two men wrote librettos include André Messager, and Gabriel Pierné. The two men also wrote a French translation of Franz Lehár's The Merry Widow in 1905 which was used throughout France during the first half of the 20th century. Their last opera collaboration was for Alfred Bruneau's 1923 opera Le jardin du paradis. De Flers also wrote the librettos for Reynaldo Hahn's Ciboulette (1923) with playwright Francis de Croisset, and Joseph Szulc's Le petit choc (1923).

De Flers and de Caillavet also often worked together on stage plays, producing such comedies as Le Sire de Vergy (1903), Les Sentiers de la vertu (1903), Pâris ou le bon juge (1906), Miquette et sa mère (1906), Primerose (1911), and L’Habit vert (1913) among other works. He later worked frequently with playwright Francis de Croisset, producing such works as Les Vignes du seigneur (1923), Les Nouveaux Messieurs (1925), and Le Docteur miracle (1926). Although a number of his operas were successful in his day, his lasting legacy rests in his stage plays.

De Flers was a member of the Académie française from 1920 up until his death in 1927. He spent the last six years of his life as literary editor of Le Figaro, a position he was appointed to in 1921. He also served as the Conseiller Général of Lozère during his latter years.

== Filmography ==
- Il bosco sacro, directed by Carmine Gallone (Italy, 1915, based on the play Le Bois sacré)
- Hans bröllopsnatt, directed by Mauritz Stiller (Sweden, 1915, based on the play La belle aventure)
- The Beautiful Adventure, directed by Dell Henderson (1917, based on the play La belle aventure)
- L'asino di Buridano, directed by Eleuterio Rodolfi (Italy, 1917, based on the play L'Âne de Buridan)
- Love Watches, directed by Henry Houry (1918, based on the play L'amour veille)
- Primerose, directed by Mario Caserini (Italy, 1919, based on the play Primerose)
- The King on Main Street, directed by Monta Bell (1925, based on the play Le Roi)
- The New Gentlemen, directed by Jacques Feyder (France, 1929, based on the play Les Nouveaux Messieurs)
- The Beautiful Adventure, directed by Reinhold Schünzel (Germany, 1932, based on the play La belle aventure)
  - The Beautiful Adventure, directed by Reinhold Schünzel and Roger Le Bon (French, 1932, based on the play La belle aventure)
- Our Lord's Vineyard, directed by René Hervil (France, 1932, based on the play Les Vignes du Seigneur)
- Buridan's Donkey, directed by Alexandre Ryder (France, 1932, based on the play L'Âne de Buridan)
- Ciboulette, directed by Claude Autant-Lara (France, 1933, based on the operetta Ciboulette)
- Primerose, directed by René Guissart (France, 1934, based on the play Primerose)
- Miquette, directed by Henri Diamant-Berger (France, 1934, based on the play Miquette et sa mère)
- Äventyret, directed by Per-Axel Branner (Sweden, 1936, based on the play La belle aventure)
- The King, directed by Pierre Colombier (France, 1936, based on the play Le Roi)
- L'Ange du foyer, directed by Léon Mathot (France, 1937, based on the play L'Ange du foyer)
- L'amour veille, directed by Henry Roussel (France, 1937, based on the play L'amour veille)
- The Green Jacket, directed by Roger Richebé (France, 1937, based on the play L'Habit vert)
- Monsieur Brotonneau, directed by Alexander Esway (France, 1939, based on the play Monsieur Brotonneau)
- Papacito lindo, directed by Fernando de Fuentes (Mexico, 1939, based on the play Miquette et sa mère)
- Sacred Woods, directed by Léon Mathot (France, 1939, based on the play Le Bois sacré)
- Miquette, directed by Jean Boyer (France, 1940, based on the play Miquette et sa mère)
- Dernière Aventure, directed by Robert Péguy (France, 1942, based on the play Papa)
- The Beautiful Adventure, directed by Marc Allégret (France, 1942, based on the play La belle aventure)
- A Royal Affair, directed by Marc-Gilbert Sauvajon (France, 1949, based on the play Le Roi)
- Miquette, directed by Henri-Georges Clouzot (France, 1950, based on the play Miquette et sa mère)
- Bruden fra Dragstrup, directed by Annelise Reenberg (Denmark, 1955, based on the play La belle aventure)
- Les Vignes du Seigneur, directed by Jean Boyer (France, 1958, based on the play Les Vignes du Seigneur)
- Ihana seikkailu, directed by Toivo Särkkä (Finland, 1962, based on the play La belle aventure)
- Le Maestro, directed by Claude Vital (France, 1977, based on the play Les Vignes du Seigneur)
