= Miquette (1940 film) =

1940 film

- Movie poster
- Directed by: Jean Boyer
- Written by: Jacques Chabannes; Jean Boyer
- Based on: Miquette et sa mere by Robert de Flers and Gaston Arman de Caillavet
- Produced by: Claude Dolbert
- Starring: Lilian Harvey; Lucien Baroux; André Lefaur; Daniel Clérice
- Cinematography: Marc Bujard
- Edited by: Louisette Hautecoeur
- Music by: Jane Bos; Georges Van Parys
- Production company: UFPC
- Distributed by: UFPC
- Release date: 1 May 1940
- Running time: 100 minutes
- Country: France
- Language: French

Miquette is a 1940 French comedy film directed by Jean Boyer and starring Lilian Harvey, Lucien Baroux and André Lefaur. It was one of two films made in France by the Anglo-German star Harvey, after emigrating from Nazi Germany. It was her final film appearance, although she continued to act on stage.

The film is based on the play Miquette et sa mère by Robert de Flers and Gaston Arman de Caillavet, which was later adapted into the 1950 film Miquette.

== Cast ==
- Lilian Harvey as Miquette Grandier
- Lucien Baroux as Monchablon
- André Lefaur as Le marquis de la Tour-Mirande
- Daniel Clérice as Urbain de la Tour-Mirande
- Marguerite Pierry as Madame Grandier
- Léon Belières as Lahirel
- Suzanne Dantès as Mademoiselle Émilienne
- Agnès Capri as Madame Mercadier
- Madeleine Suffel as Perrine
- Daniel Gélin
- Eliane Charles
- Jean Brochard
- Hugues de Bagratide
- Yvonne Yma
- Madeleine Suffel as Perrine
- Anthony Gildès

== Bibliography ==
- Ascheid, Antje (2010) [2003]. Hitler's Heroines: Stardom and Womanhood in Nazi Cinema. Philadelphia: Temple University Press. ISBN 978-1-59213-843-2.
