= List of French films of 1918 =

A list of films produced in France in 1918.

Title	Director	Cast	Genre	Notes
L'Accusé	Charles Maudru	Rachel Devirys, Jeanne Brindeau		
Aide-toi				
L'Aigle boche est vaincu				
Ainsi va la vie				
American Troops on Furlough				
Anana, chauffeur d'auto				
André Cornélis	Georges Denola and Jean Kemm			
Angoisse dans la nuit				
The Count of Monte Cristo	Henri Pouctal	Léon Mathot, Nelly Cormon	Adventure	
Marion Delorme	Henry Krauss	Pierre Renoir, Jean Worms	Historical	
The Tenth Symphony	Abel Gance	Severin-Mars, Jean Toulout	Drama	
Tih Minh	Louis Feuillade	Mary Harald, René Cresté	Serial	
Vendémiaire	Louis Feuillade			

== See also ==
- 1918 in France
