= Cultural depictions of Gilles de Rais =

Works of fiction featuring Gilles de Rais

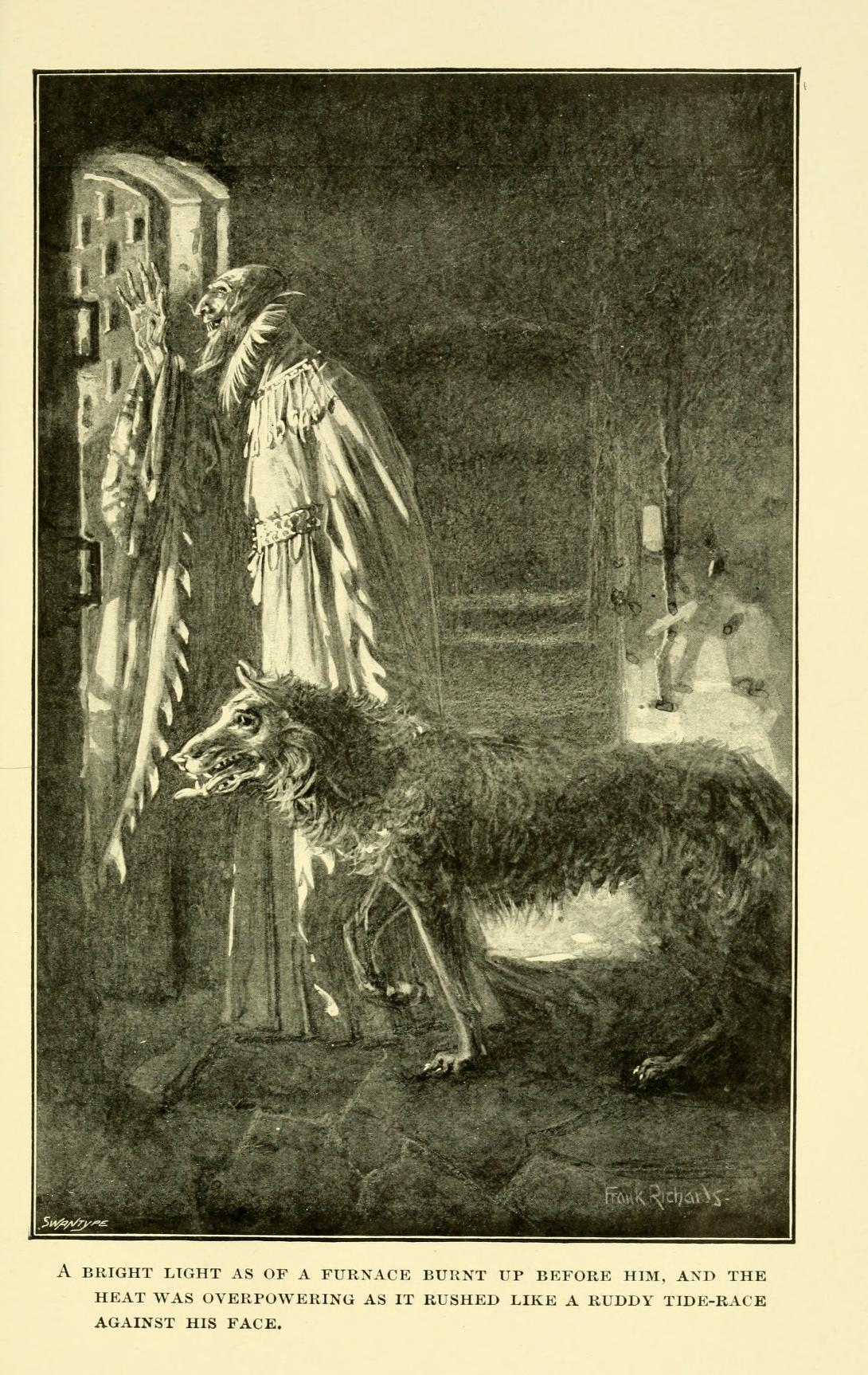
Gilles de Retz with a female lycanthrope in Samuel Rutherford Crockett's historical fantasy novel The Black Douglas (1899). The character may be at least partially a literary inspiration for J. R. R. Tolkien's Sauron, another evil antagonist with werewolf servants and a taste for torturing his victims in his high towers, but the exact connection is disputed between Tolkien's scholars.

Cultural depictions of Gilles de Rais refer to the representations of the 15th-century French nobleman, military commander, and convicted child murderer in literature, theatre, music, visual arts, and other cultural media.

A companion-in-arms of Joan of Arc during the Hundred Years' War and later associated with the folktale character Bluebeard, Gilles de Rais has inspired a wide range of portrayals from the late Middle Ages to the present day.

His image first appeared in medieval dramatic and literary texts, underwent a long period of relative obscurity, and was revived in the 19th century through Romantic and Gothic interpretations. Since then, he has appeared in numerous works of fiction, including novels, plays, operas, films, comic books, animation, musical compositions, and video games, with portrayals variously emphasizing his military career as a Marshal of France, his alleged crimes, his role alongside Joan of Arc, or his transformation into an embodiment of aristocratic cruelty and evil.

== Iconography ==
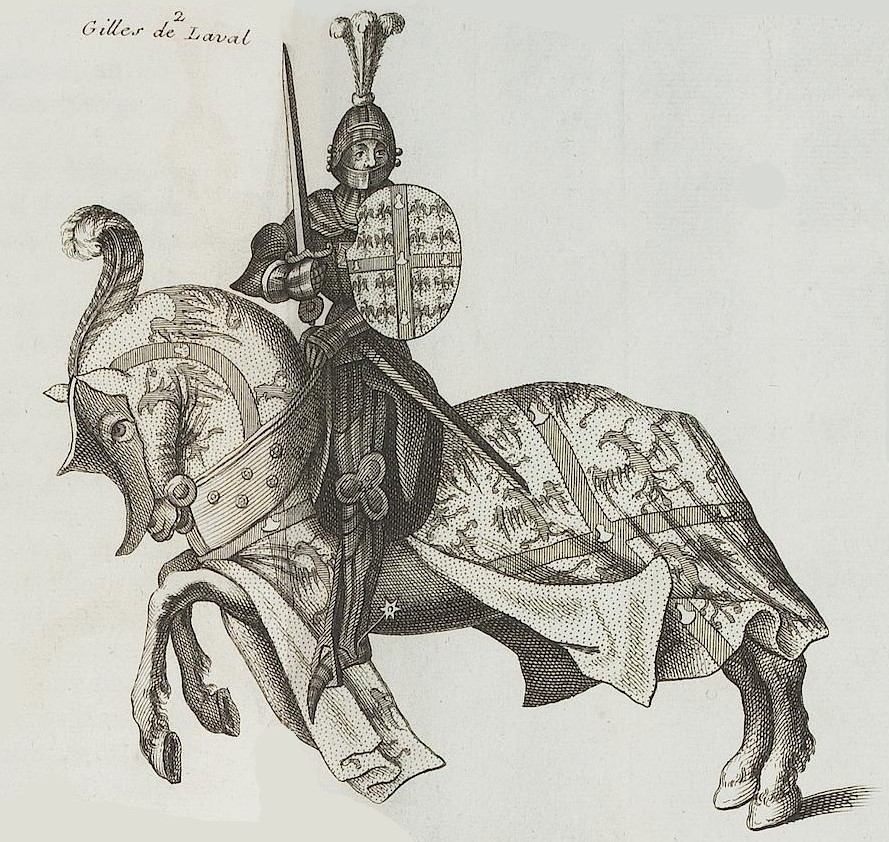
"Gilles de Laval", engraving from Dom Bernard de Montfaucon's Les monumens de la monarchie françoise... (1731)

All effigies of Gilles de Rais are posthumous and imaginary.

An engraving purporting to represent him was published in 1731 in Dom Bernard de Montfaucon's Les monumens de la monarchie françoise, qui comprennent l'histoire de France, avec les figures de chaque règne que l'injure des tems a épargées. Captioned "Gilles de Laval", this equestrian figure reproduces a 15th-century miniature on parchment captioned simply "Laval", included in the Armorial of Gilles Le Bouvier, herald of King Charles VII of France.

Whether in the fifteenth-century Laval illumination or the eighteenth-century engraved "Gilles de Laval" copy, the knight's facial features in armor are concealed by his closed helmet, while his shield and mount cover prominently display the arms of the Counts of Laval – not those of the Barons of Retz. Although Dom Bernard de Montfaucon believes he recognizes Gilles de Rais in the illumination, the equestrian figure cannot be identified with certainty since it's an "abstract" representation of the Counts of Laval, a heraldic image rather than an individual portrait. Montfaucon's disputed identification was nonetheless later taken up by other authors, starting with the Abbé Eugène Bossard.

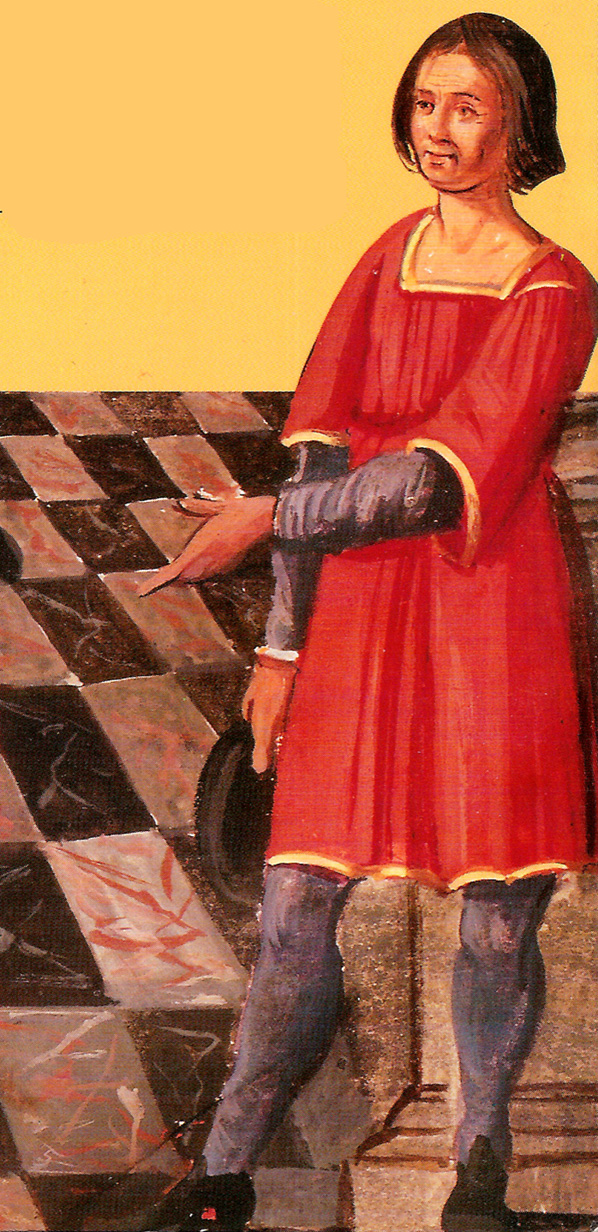
The trial of Gilles de Rais (detail of a 17th-century miniature)

In addition, Gilles de Rais is depicted as beardless, with medium-length hair and "dressed in an anachronistic Renaissance costume" in two miniatures depicting his trial and execution respectively. The first miniature adorns a copy of the ecclesiastical trial, and the second a copy of the civil trial. Stamped with the Bouhier family coat of arms, the two illuminations and their manuscript supports were once kept by the jurist and historian Jean Bouhier, president at the parlement of Dijon. Partly inherited from his grandfather, President Bouhier's collection of manuscript compilations was part of the scholarly tradition, in the 17th and 18th centuries, of assembling copies of trials relating to crimes of lèse-majesté as examples of the legal condemnations meted out to the nobility.

Dating back to the 16th century, the miniature of the execution depicts the repentant criminal, hands bound and joined in a gesture of prayer, head and eyes humbly lowered in contrition. The other miniature, dating from the 17th century, depicts Gilles de Rais, holding his headdress in hand and addressing the mitred bishop who presides over the officiality during the ecclesiastical trial.

The most famous artist's view remains Éloi Firmin Féron's oil on canvas, commissioned on December 29, 1834, by the government of King Louis Philippe I to legitimize the July Monarchy "by recovering and instrumentalizing historical representations of old France" in the Palace of Versailles. Against the backdrop of the assault on Meung-sur-Loire, with his "well-trimmed beard" and pageboy haircut, firmly planted on dilapidated rubble and leaning on an axe, Gilles de Rais in damascened armor takes his place, as a military figure of the Hundred Years' War, in the Gallery of French Marshals of the Musée de l'Histoire de France. Like the other full-length portraits of this gallery, the oil on canvas depicts Gilles de Rais "on a battlefield with [his] attributes of command".

== Folklore ==
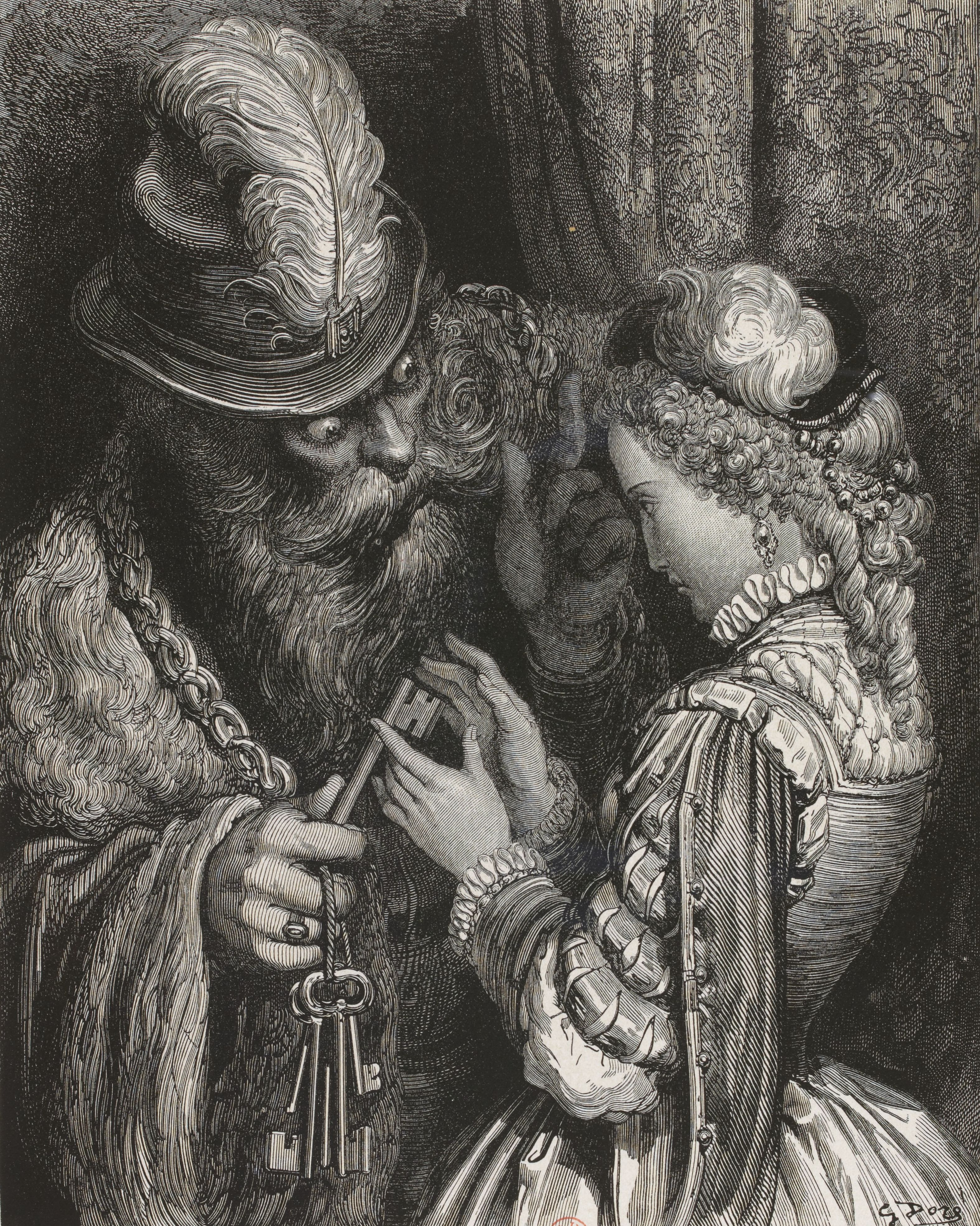
Bluebeard gives his wife the keys to his castle, art by Gustave Doré (1862)

Like other historical figures such as Conomor or Henry VIII, Gilles de Rais has frequently been associated with the main character of the Bluebeard tale, to such an extent that this association has become "a cliché of folklorist literature", points out Catherine Velay-Vallantin, French specialist in the study of fairy tales. She adds that "it's pointless to look for the origin of the Bluebeard tale in this true crime", stressing that the tale "exists independently of the historical fact of Gilles de Rais". Vincent Petitjean, French doctor in comparative literature, nevertheless highlights the fact that "the confusion between the two characters is effective and is bound to make sense."

=== Gilles de Rais, inspiration for Charles Perrault's tale? ===
The life and deeds of Gilles de Rais bear little resemblance to the wife-killer depicted in the folk tale. Historian and archivist-paleographer Matei Cazacu, though, considers that the circumstances of Rais' execution and burial offer plausible premises for his assimilation to Bluebeard. His hanging might have left a mark on the minds of the little children who were probably whipped on the same day, in accordance with the custom of corporally chastising them when a criminal was executed. Furthermore, Gilles de Rais' coffin was carried by several noble ladies and demoiselles before his burial on Christian soil. Cazacu also believes that a process of folklorization is already underway in the 15th-century Chronique of Enguerrand de Monstrelet, which attributes wrongly to Gilles de Rais murders of pregnant women in addition to child murders.

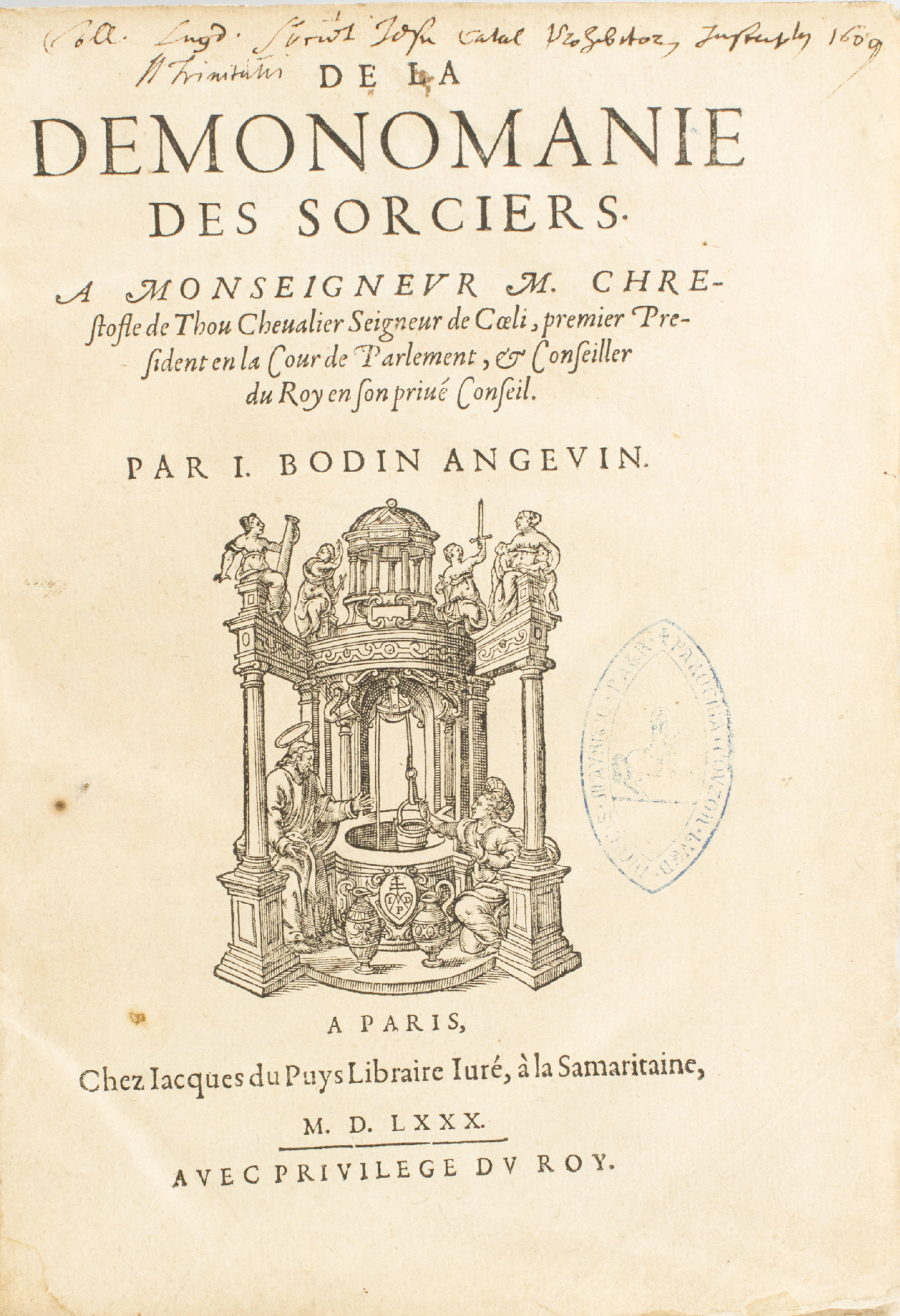
Of the Demon-mania of the Sorcerers (1580)

In the following century, in his treatise Of the Demon-mania of the Sorcerers (De la démonomanie des sorciers, 1580), Jean Bodin also refrains from mentioning child sexual abuse, borrowing from Enguerrand de Monstrelet the motif of the satanist assassin sacrificing fetuses removed from their mothers' wombs. Bodin adds that Gilles de Rais was about to kill his own son in this way, but his wife noticed in time, so he was hauled off to trial. Again, Matei Cazacu observes that these fanciful elements seem partially reminiscent of the myth of Bluebeard. Either way, history writing seemed then to be more comfortable with a heretic (an idolatrous sorcerer immolizing children to the devil) than with a sadistic killer.

Charles Perrault's Stories or Tales from Past Times, with Morals was published in 1697 by the Parisian bookseller and printer Claude Barbin. This book included La Barbe bleue, "a story [which] is not an invention by Perrault, but a folk tale and ballad that circulated throughout Europe long before 1697 under different names and in many variants", says Matei Cazacu. However, according to Abbot Eugène Bossard and Matei Cazacu himself, Gilles de Rais' life may have inspired, directly or indirectly, the writing of the tale.

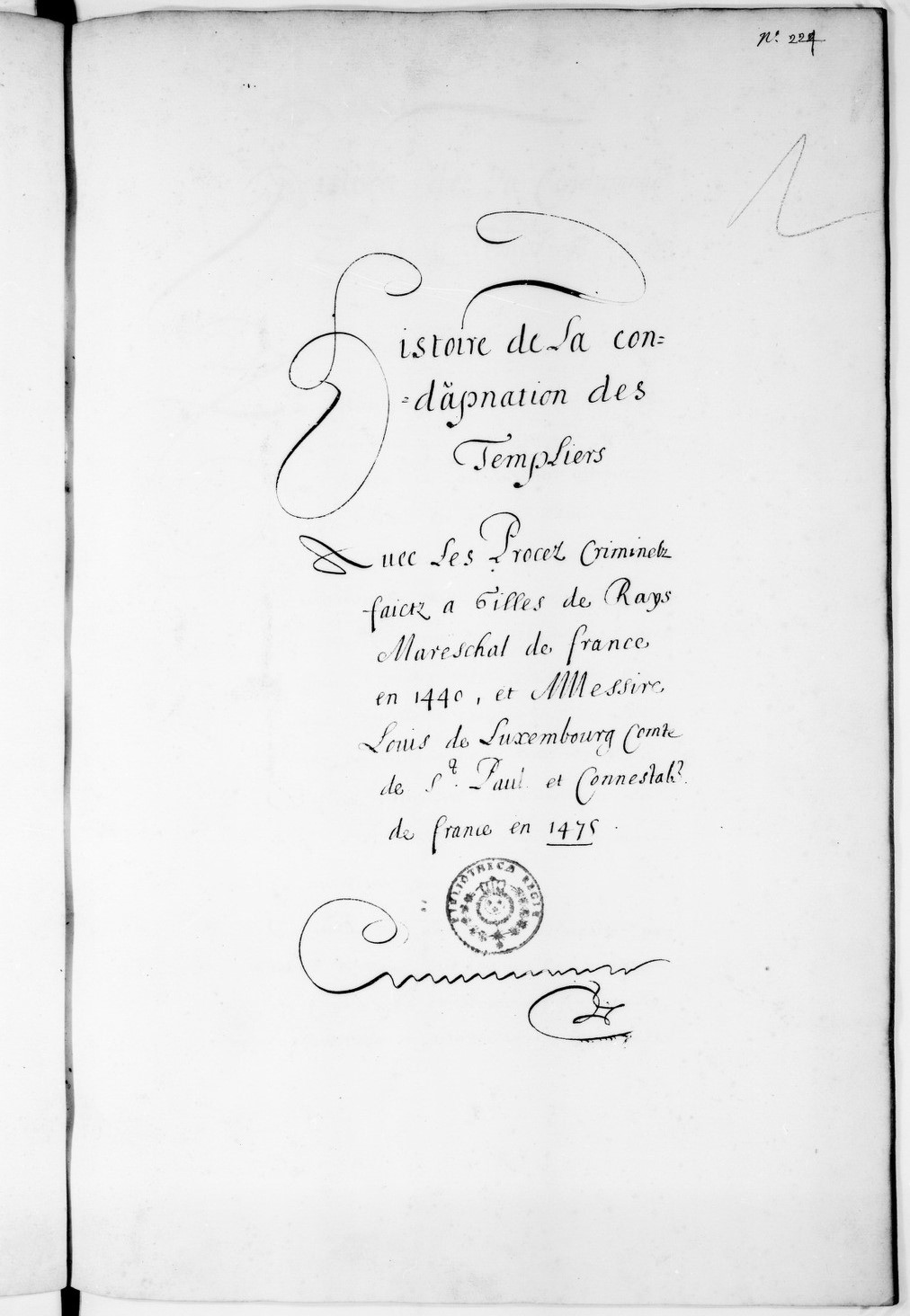
17th-century manuscript compiling various criminal proceedings, among them the trial of Gilles de Rais

Cazacu speculates that Perrault may have planted several clues in his text that could lead back to Gilles de Rais, starting with the absence of the usual "conte" (tale) subtitle in the original edition printed in 1697, among other sibylline allusions to an authentic story rather than a marvelous fable. Thanks to his law studies, the author of Mother Goose Tales could have had access to one of the many handwritten transcriptions of Gilles de Rais' ecclesiastical and secular trials, since such copies circulated as medieval examples of lèse-majesté cases in 17th-century legal communities, fond of scholarly trial collections. In particular, Cazacu detects similarities between the themes of Perrault's tale (the forbidden room and female curiosity) and the confessions of Gilles de Rais' accomplices mentioning a locked room containing human bodies or limbs, as well as the indiscretion of a certain "lady of Jarville" (maybe Jeanne des Armoises ?) peering through a slit at Gilles de Rais' servants removing the bones of their master's victims from Machecoul castle.

Nevertheless, the hypothesis that Gilles de Rais served as inspiration for Charles Perrault is refuted as too uncertain by Vincent Petitjean. This scholar discerns no reference, however veiled, to Gilles de Rais' story in the version put down on paper by Perrault. It is not established that the latter knew Gilles de Rais' life, or that this knowledge was "decisive in the writing of the tale", affirms Petitjean, who clearly distinguishes this issue from another phenomenon: "the popular confusion between Gilles de Rais and Bluebeard".

=== Popular confusion between Gilles de Rais and Bluebeard ===
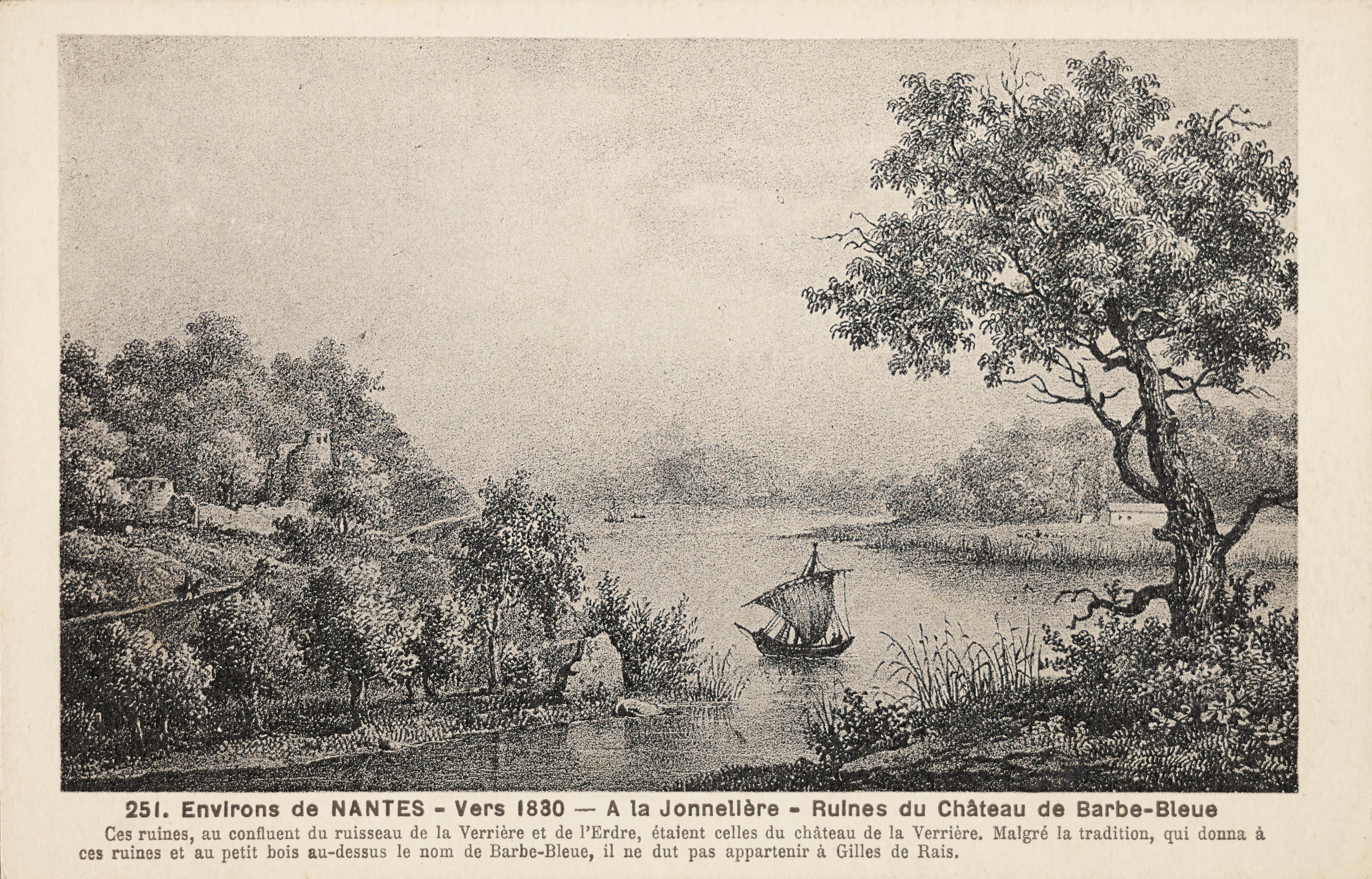
Ruins of La Verrière castle. Postcard, c. 1830

The written record of this confusion dates back to 1820, the year of publication of the "Description de la rivière d'Erdre depuis Nantes jusqu'à Nort" ("Description of the Erdre river from Nantes to Nort"), a letter subsequently included in the book Voyage pittoresque dans le département de la Loire-Inférieure. In this account of his journey through what is now the Loire-Atlantique department, writer Édouard Richer was the first author to mention, in print, a popular assimilation between Gilles de Rais and Bluebeard. According to vernacular accounts, a legend was rooted in the remains of La Verrière castle on the banks of the Erdre, although these ruins were located outside Gilles de Rais' historic domains: seven large trees stood there like monuments of expiation allegedly dedicated to the memory of the fabled wives murdered by the local lord.

In 1836, the amalgam was popularized in Notes d'un voyage dans l'ouest de la France, a report in which Prosper Mérimée (a writer as much as an inspector-general of historical monuments) also interpreted regional traditions relating to Bluebeard "as a mythologized memory of Gilles de Rais." The idea was later taken up by Stendhal in his Mémoires d'un touriste, another travelogue published in 1838.

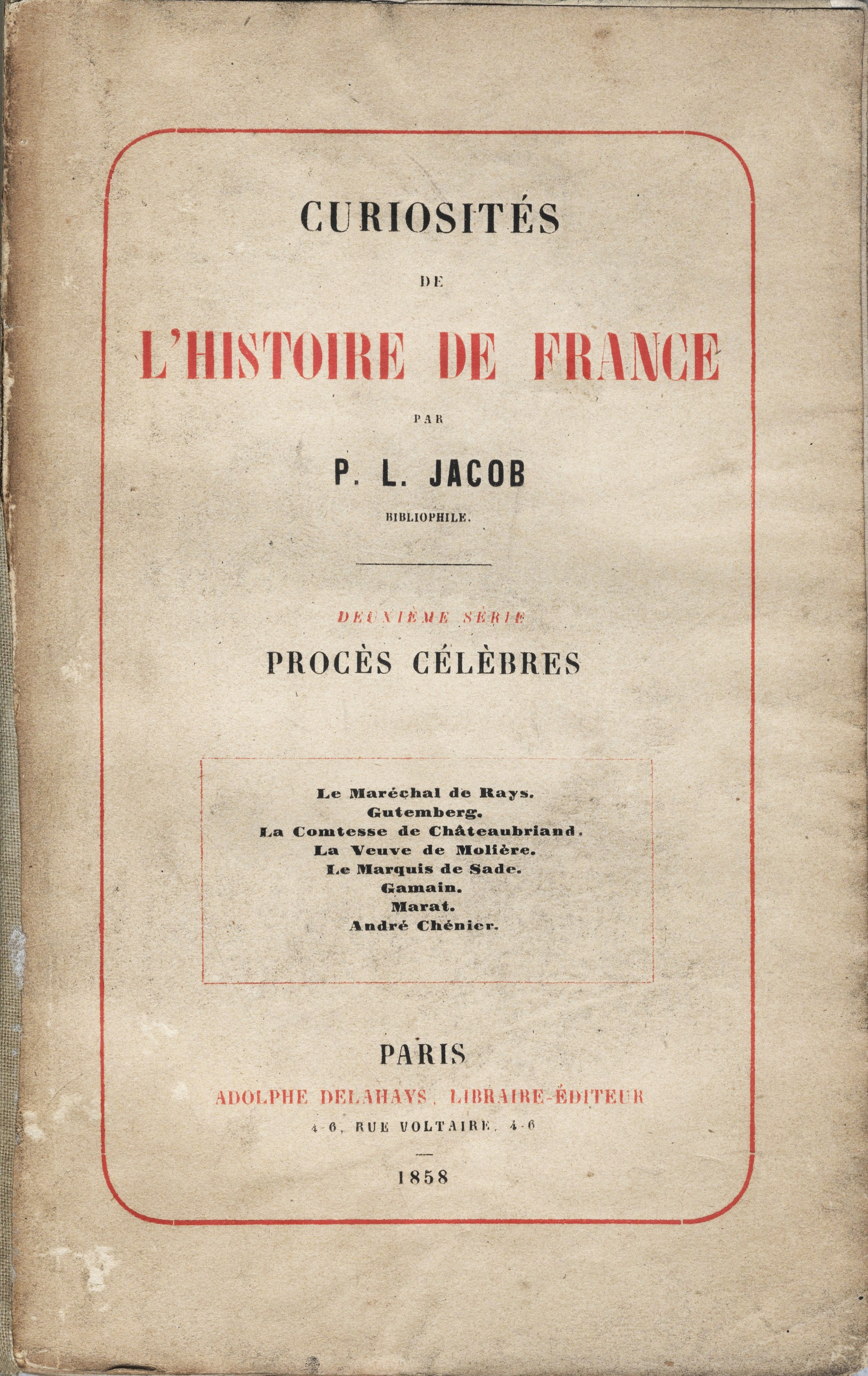
Paul Lacroix's Curiosités de l'histoire de France (1858). This pseudo-historical treatise not only popularized the amalgam between Bluebeard and Gilles de Rais, but also contaminated studies about the latter

In 1858, in his pseudo-historical accounts entitled Curiosités de l'histoire de France, polygraph Paul Lacroix (also known by the pen name "Bibliophile Jacob") fictitiously endowed Gilles de Rais with blond hair that clashed with a black beard with "almost bluish highlights, which had given the Sire de Rays the epithet Bluebeard, a popular nickname in Brittany, where his story was transformed into a fantastic tale." Among other popular details invented by "Bibliophile Jacob", Gilles de Rais' singular facial hair and sobriquet ostensibly assimilated him to the cruel husband of the folk tale, but Lacroix failed to specify which version of the tale he was referring to. Thus, he opened the path to Gilles de Rais' romanticized appearance in the literature of the time, taken up again and again by other novelists such as Émilie Carpentier (Mémoires de Barbe-Bleue, 1865) and Alexandre de Lamothe (Les Mystères de Machecoul, 1871).

On the historical front, Jules Michelet devoted four pages to Gilles de Rais in Volume V of his Histoire de France (1841), a passage that enjoyed considerable literary influence. He did not then draw any connection with Bluebeard. However, a "new revised and expanded edition", published in the 1870s, asserted that "the story of the Breton Retz, much softened, provided the material for a tale; moreover (to preserve the honor of the family or the country?), his name was replaced by that of the English partisan Blue Barb." The writer Ernest d'Hervilly later wrote that he had "searched in vain for any trace" of this enigmatic Englishman.

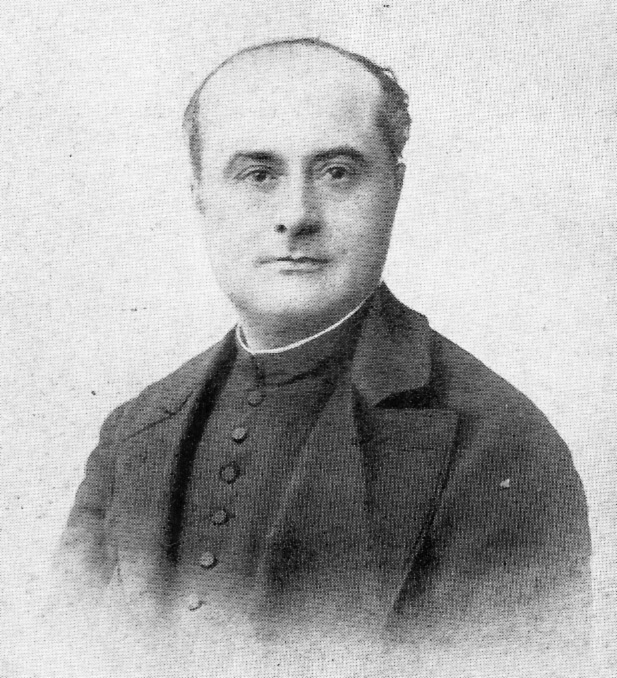
To support his dissertation published in 1885, the Abbé Eugène Bossard gleaned folktales relating to Bluebeard

On another note, some witnesses (like Pierre Foucher, father-in-law of Victor Hugo, and Antoine-Étienne Carro, a librarian from Meaux) referred to popular beliefs that equate Gilles de Rais with Bluebeard. (Note: In his memoir published posthumously in 1929, Pierre Foucher recalls the bourgeois of Nantes mentioning "Bluebeard's castle" during their Sunday strolls to Tiffauges castle. According to Matei Cazacu, Pierre Foucher's recollections date back to 1778–1790, making this the earliest record of the "process of amalgamation" between Gilles de Rais and Bluebeard. Moreover, librarian Antoine-Étienne Carro visited Champtocé castle in 1862; he then noticed that Bluebeard had supplanted Gilles de Rais in local tales.) Yet it was mainly the Abbé Eugène Bossard who claimed to have gathered a number of local traditions in support of his dissertation defended in December 1885. Within Bossard's ethnological collection, several "naïve tales" ignored the historical Gilles de Rais and enthroned Bluebeard in his place at Tiffauges, Machecoul and Champtocé. Hence, Bossard intended to demonstrate the constant, centuries-old nature of an "identical, universal" tradition of Breton origin, simultaneously preserving and distorting the terrible memory of Gilles de Rais, as attested by a vox populi embodied by geographically dispersed witnesses and repositories of ancestral memory ("mothers, nannies" and other "near-nonagenarian" elders). In this way, Bluebeard would not be Gilles de Rais, but a representation of him. Bossard concluded that the process of popular assimilation between Gilles de Rais and Bluebeard predated the publication of Mother Goose Tales.

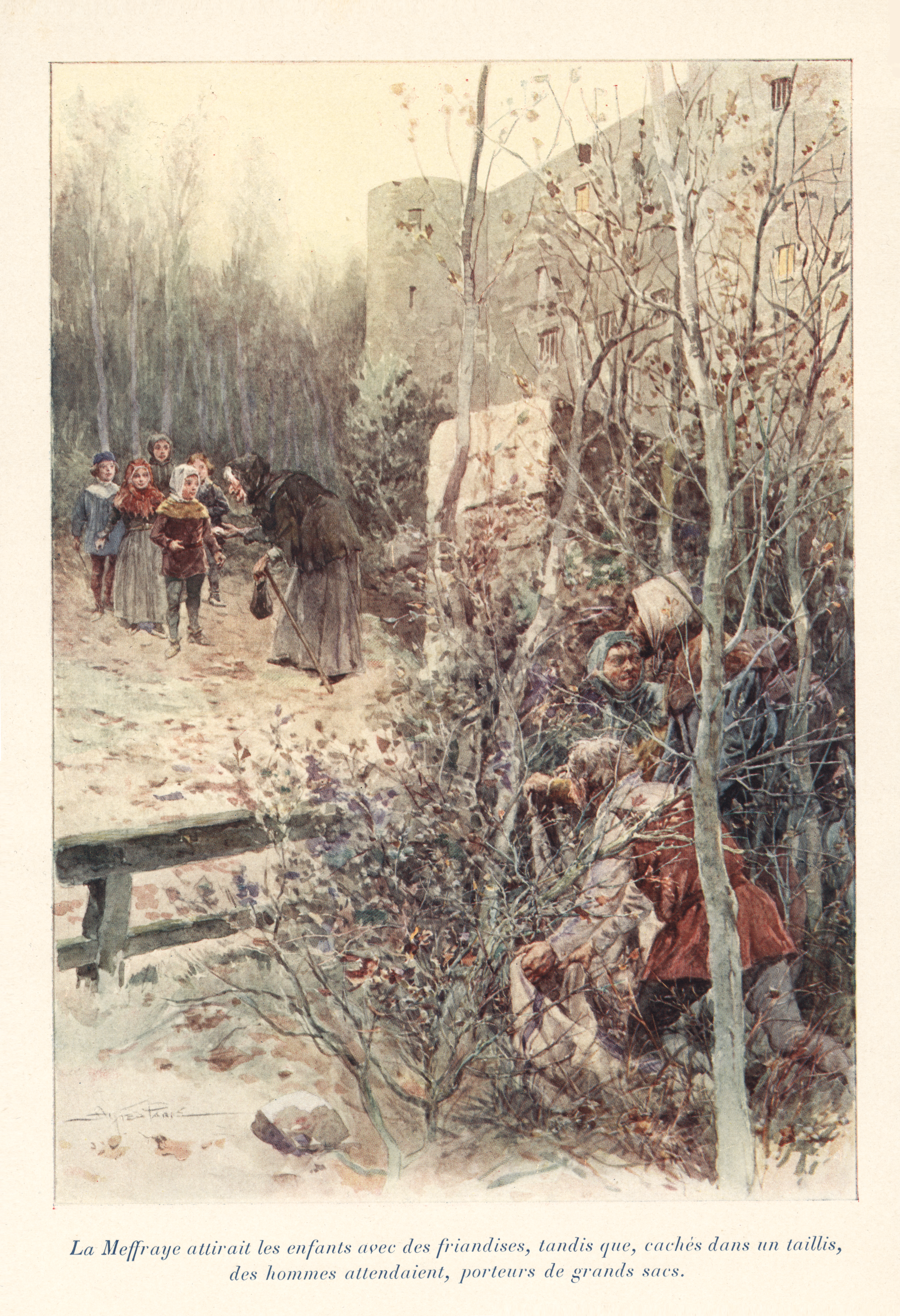
"La Meffraye lured children with sweets, while, hidden in a thicket, men waited, carrying large sacks." According to the scholar Charles Mourain de Sourdeval, the inhabitants of Nantes and the Pays de Retz still retained, in the 1840s, the collective memory of the fifteenth-century child disappearances, expressed through their belief in the empocheurs ("pocketers"), folkloric figures akin to sorcerers and werewolves. Color plate after a watercolor by Alfred Paris, 1913

Bossard's assertions were severely criticized by the examination board when he defended his thesis at the Poitiers Faculty of Letters in December 1885. As a member of the board, historian Jules Flammermont rejected the idea that Gilles de Rais is the originator of the Bluebeard legend, arguing as well that Bossard failed to prove the antiquity of this legendary confusion, which was reported only in the early 19th century. Lastly, Flammermont asserted that Bossard had merely unearthed popular legends from the Grand dictionnaire universel du XIXe siècle.

Drawing on the works of scholars Marc Soriano and Ute Heidmann, Vincent Petitjean also objects that the folktale is "an ungrateful object of study, since it is impossible to know the state of a version at a given moment, due to the narrative dynamics that make it elaborate as it is transmitted". As a result, we do not know the exact content of the oral and popular narrative from which Perrault's tale originally drew its inspiration, and which sets down in writing a perennial version. As scholar Roger Zuber explains, Mother Goose Tales is a literary work in its own right, which maintains a complex intertextual dialogue with multiple sources (Virgil, Apuleius, Paul Scarron). Therefore, Perrault's work cannot be linked arbitrarily to evanescent oral traditions, which are by their very nature incapable of clarifying the debate. For Roger Zuber, it is literature (the tale written by Perrault) that ends up making its mark on folklore, and not the other way round. Not free from approximations, Bossard's thesis is henceforth weakened in the eyes of Vincent Petitjean: "Was the story of Bluebeard that people told each other the same in Bossard's time as in Perrault's, the same in Perrault's time as it was when Gilles died?" This question is all the more important because a veritable literary explosion took hold of the folkloric tales (including "Bluebeard") from the second half of the 19th century onwards, offering a host of rewritten versions.

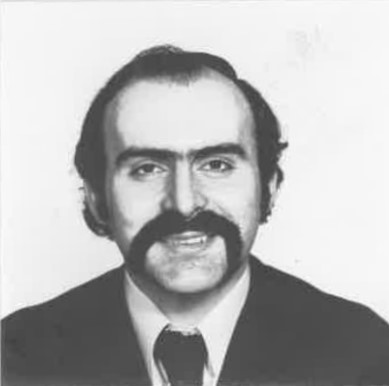
Historian and archivist-paleographer Matei Cazacu studies the relationship between myth (Bluebeard) and history (Gilles de Rais)

Bossard's thesis popularized the connection between Gilles de Rais and the mythical wife-murderer, but from the second half of the 20th century onwards, successive editions of Mother Goose Tales no longer seemed to rely on it, abandoning a vain "quest for origins". However, Matei Cazacu supports and updates some of Bossard's conclusions, by highlighting the cartographic concordance between three types of data: "the geographical distribution of Gilles de Rais' properties in Brittany, Vendée, Poitou, Anjou and Maine; the localities from which children had disappeared and which are mentioned in the 1440 trials; the localities where the Bluebeard tale has been recorded by folklorists." In specific regions identifying the marshal of France with the bluish bearded murderer, a mythical character with no precise identity or temporal anchorage, the ruins of Gilles de Rais' fortresses "have contributed, by their mere existence, to the fixation of the stories on a material support, a veritable site of memory". Today, the castles of Machecoul and Tiffauges are still commonly associated with Bluebeard in tourist signs.

Besides, it's difficult to pass down the memory of child sexual abuse (a taboo subject) from one generation to another, according to Matei Cazacu. This would explain why there are no examples of this kind of abuse in folklore, where the child remains a prime example of an "asexual being", despite the many folktales depicting children variously killed and devoured. The collective memory would consequently be operating a "shift in meaning" from generation to generation, finally integrating the historical figure of Gilles de Rais into the "known category" of the murderer of women, an archetype personified in this case by a horrible "virile (bearded) seducer", Bluebeard.

Nevertheless, to medievalist Olivier Bouzy, the case of Gilles de Rais does not fall within the mythification process analyzed by French philologist and religious studies scholar Georges Dumézil. According to the latter, a myth can become a story (such as an Indo-European deity's transfiguration into Horatius Cocles, in accordance with Roman historiography) but Bouzy observes that the haphazard assimilation of Gilles de Rais to Bluebeard reverses the aforementioned process. Moreover, Bouzy deems the wife-murderer and his forbidden chamber to be "a simple rewriting of the myth of Pandora and her famous box", while Gilles de Rais, sadistic killer and rapist of dozens of children, cannot be "an avatar of the bland Bluebeard".

== Literature ==
Succubi and astral projections surrounding Gilles de Rais in Roland Brévannes' literary series Les Messes noires ("Black Masses"), which exploited the Belle Époque's fascination for the occult and Satanism.

During the 15th century, Gilles de Rais appears in the mystery play entitled Mystère du siège d'Orléans (c. 1450–1500) as a captain devoted to Joan of Arc's cause. In "Le Temple de Boccace" (c. 1465), a poem written mainly in prose, Flemish historiographer Georges Chastellain evokes the hanged corpse of a "sad and unfortunate knight", delivered to the flames and surrounded by a ghostly cloud of vindictive children. Gilles de Rais then underwent a long eclipse in cultural representations.

Medieval chronicles do not generally dwell on his existence, nor do regional historians of the modern era. During the Ancien Régime, classicism did not focus on this type of character, while peddler literature, despite its fondness for edifying true crime stories, does not broach the subject of the hanged marshal. In the Age of Enlightenment, Voltaire mentioned Gilles de Rais briefly, presenting him as a victim of superstition and religious fanaticism. Later, the Marquis de Sade referenced Gilles de Rais succinctly as an example of a "master libertine" and "instrument of the laws of nature" in Philosophy in the Bedroom and Juliette.

The case of Gilles de Rais began to be discussed more frequently in the 19th century. Folk tales recorded his transfiguration into Bluebeard. What's more, Romantic literature provided then a fitting backdrop for the evocation of Gilles de Rais' criminal life, in the literary continuity of the nefarious brigand lords depicted in Gothic fiction. Simultaneously, anti-nobility polemics (inherent to the French political landscape in this time) gave rise to tales with historical pretensions, populated by feudal lords who abuse their seigneurial rights by committing pillage, kidnapping and raping unfortunate victims locked in dreadful dungeons. All this horror imagery foreshadowed fictions centered on Gilles de Rais as an "evil lord".

Since then, literature has successively presented various Gilles de Rais' facets, from the bluish bearded lord portrayed in minor works by writers fond of the medieval clichés of 19th-century dark romanticism, to the double being (wild beast and "decadent aesthete") portrayed in 1891 in Joris-Karl Huysmans' fin de siècle novel Là-bas (where the protagonist Durtal conducts intensive research into this historical figure), to the "sacred monster" in Georges Bataille's 1959 essay, and the ambivalent ogre in Michel Tournier's novels. However, Gilles de Rais is not yet a literary myth, as he remains "a bit like Bluebeard's victims: hidden in a dark, morbid, forbidden chamber, and visited from time to time by a daring and curious author", according to Vincent Petitjean, French doctor in comparative literature.

=== Joan of Arc and Gilles de Rais in literature ===
Many authors have been fascinated by the theme of a future criminal standing side by side with Joan of Arc on the battlefields of the Hundred Years' War, so much so that this thematic duality has become a literary topos peculiar to Gilles de Rais. Writer Alain Jost notes its "dramatic effect is assured and the Manichean symbolism is obvious"; Gilles and Joan shared youth and military fame, their given names "sound good together", "their destinies will be both parallel and radically opposed: both tried and executed", one embodying demonic vice and the other holy virtue.

Joan of Arc and Gilles de Rais at the coronation of Charles VII of France in Reims Cathedral. Excerpt from an etching by Fernand Hertenberger published in a 1926 edition of Joris-Karl Huysmans's novel Là-bas

Therefore, fiction took up the topic of Gilles de Rais's feelings towards Joan of Arc, covering a palette ranging from friendship to religious devotion to a more troubled fascination. In Joris-Karl Huysmans' novel Là-bas, the protagonist Durtal, planning to write a book about Gilles de Rais, paints the Middle Ages in the vivid colors of crime and Satanism, while drawing a parallel between medieval times and "the 19th century fond of spiritualism, occultism and black masses". In doing so, Durtal assumes that "Gilles de Rais's mysticism was exalted" by the side of the Maid of Orléans, whose epic is akin to a miraculous irruption of the divine in the daily life of the royal army's brutish soldiers. Joris-Karl Huysmans situates the two historical figures at "two opposite poles of the soul", until the trial at Nantes, where Gilles de Rais, repentant sinner "struck by grace", finally reappeared as Joan of Arc's companion-in-arms.

The canonization of Joan of Arc in 1920 prompted a renewed literary interest in the figure of the saint. In Jeanne d'Arc (1925)—a novel criticized for its nonconformist portrayal of the heroine—Joseph Delteil provides a sensuous depiction of the two companions-in-arms, presenting them in the full radiance of their youth while carefully differentiating them. As literary critic and essayist Michel Meurger remarks, the Maid allows herself to contemplate the sleeping Gilles nearby but "this sensual contemplation ... unlike contemporary fiction, does not culminate in an idyll."

Michel Tournier's novella Gilles & Jeanne is arguably the principal source of "the pseudo-historical literature that popularizes the notion of a romantic relationship between Joan of Arc and Gilles de Rais", observes medievalist Olivier Bouzy. Gilles de Rais is portrayed as a character determined to follow Joan of Arc "to heaven and hell" after drinking the blood dripping from her battlefield wound. Shattered by her execution, he sets his sights on becoming her demonic counterpart, before achieving his own redemption through purification by the flames of the stake: a reversal of values symptomatic of Michel Tournier's literary work. This writer borrowed from essayist Roland Villeneuve the hypothetical notion of Gilles de Rais's fall from grace triggered by the Maid's death by burning. Michel Tournier intensifies his character's feelings to the point of "declared love", departing from Roland Villeneuve's biographical essay, which simply evoked a "platonic love" felt by Gilles de Rais for Joan of Arc. However, Roland Villeneuve did not explain what he meant by the term "platonic", nor did he justify his interpretation, which remains inoperative when attempting to discern the psychology of Gilles de Rais, points out Matei Cazacu.

A more recent depiction comes from the acclaimed novel The Life and Death of My Lord Gilles de Rais (1990) by Robert Nye, who presents his portrait through the account of a fictional narrator, Dom Eustache Blanchet.

== Bande dessinée and manga ==
Gilles de Rais, key character in the comic series Jhen Roque by Jacques Martin and Jean Pleyers

Gilles de Rais is a central character in the French comic series Jhen Roque by Jacques Martin and Jean Pleyers. In the ligne claire style, the bande dessinée tells the medieval adventures of an artist named Jhen, architect and decorative painter. This fair, luminous and ethical figure dreams of erecting cathedrals. A builder, and therefore a civilizer, Jhen is a faithful friend of Gilles de Rais, despite everything that sets them apart, as the latter embodies the cruelty of his time. Gilles de Rais appears as "handsome and elegant", sporting a black beard that contrasts with red hair "in keeping with the evocative medieval symbolism of the Devil".

On another note, French comics artist Paul Gillon produced Jehanne (1993–1997), an erotic comic book depicting sexual relationships between Joan of Arc and Gilles de Rais.

In Shirayuri no kishi, a Shōjo manga published in 1975, Suzue Miuchi introduces two characters inspired respectively by Joan of Arc and Gilles de Rais. Eager to fight the English enemy, the heroine Jannu goes to see King Charles VII, but an evil royal advisor assigns her an impossible task: to obtain financial help from the dark lord Jiru do Re. Nicknamed Shinigami, the reclusive Jiru resides in a castle populated by wax figures, in reality the embalmed corpses of his relatives. The mangaka surrounds the fortress with a cemetery to complete the gothic imagery. Jiru devotes himself to alchemical research, with the aim of making gold and becoming the richest man in the world. Following the pattern of Beauty and the Beast, Jannu miraculously convinces Jiru do Re to turn to "good magic" by devoting himself to war against the English, in the name of God and the King.

In Kouta Hirano's manga series Drifters, Gilles de Rais is reincarnated as a colossal, indestructible warrior alongside other historical figures brought back to life in an occult war orchestrated by the shadowy Black King. Following an interpretation repeated in other mangas, Gilles de Rais committed his murders so that he could join Joan of Arc in hell. He assists the Maid resurrected as a vindictive pyromaniac who wishes to reduce the world to ashes.

== Film and television ==
=== Films about Joan of Arc ===
Gilles de Rais appears mainly in cinema as Joan of Arc's comrade-in-arms, in a number of biopics dedicated to the Maid of Orleans. Scholar Vincent Petitjean notes that "the cinematic treatment of Gilles makes him a shadow in two ways. Firstly, he is Joan's shadow, as it is through her that he is brought to light, and secondly, he is the shadow of himself, the monstrosity to come already enveloping him."

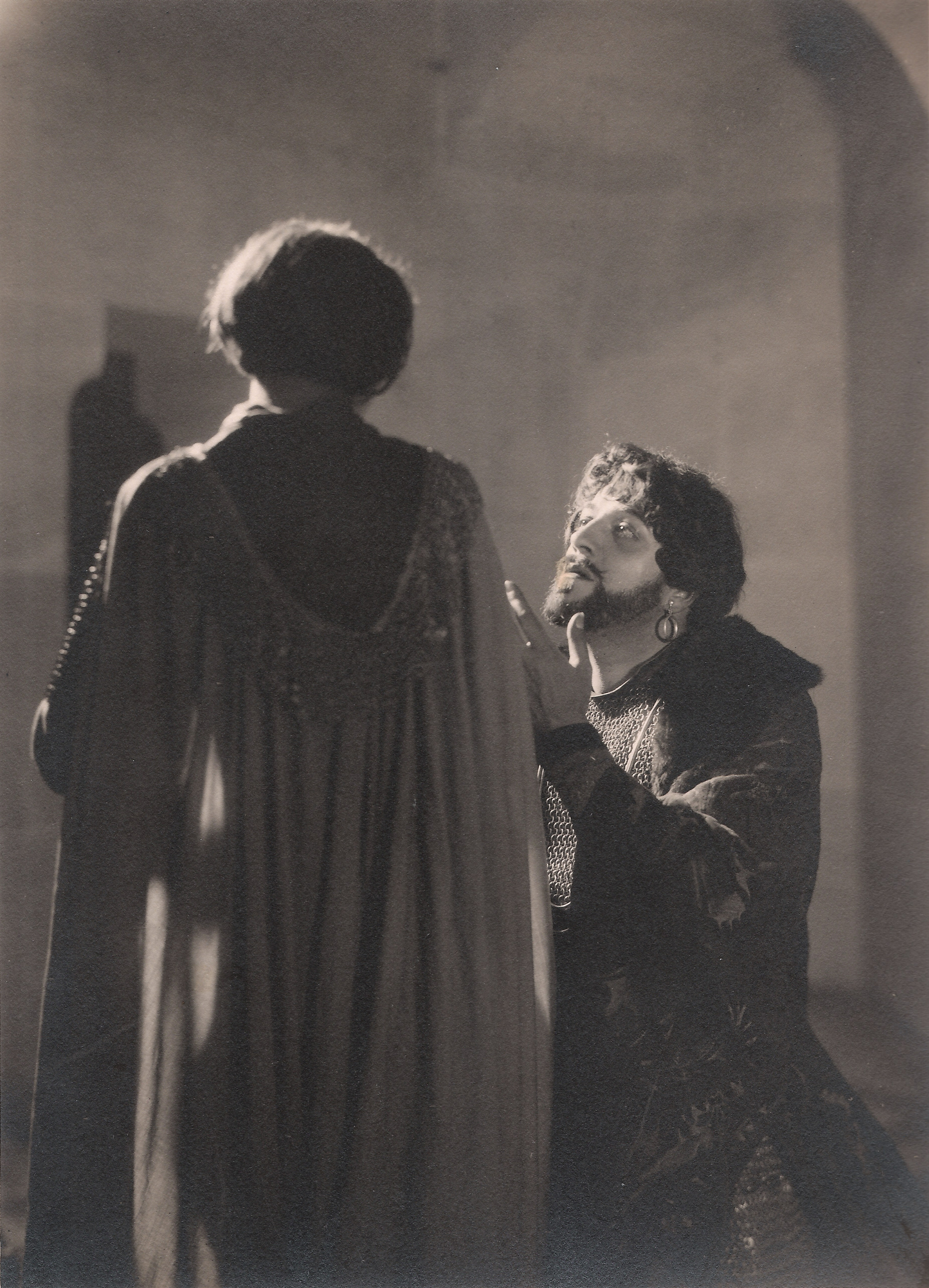
Simone Genevois (Joan of Arc) and Philippe Hériat (Gilles de Rais) in a scene from Saint Joan the Maid, a 1929 silent film directed by Marco de Gastyne

French novelist, playwright and actor Philippe Hériat played the part in Marco de Gastyne's Saint Joan the Maid in 1929. The character plays an important role, personifying all the brutish soldiers that Joan of Arc (Simone Genevois) must unite under her banner. According to the review published at the time in Cinémagazine, Hériat's performance was "remarkable for its truth, intelligence and psychological subtlety. If his Gilles de Rais sums up all the vices of an era, he also has its faith."

Henry Brandon played the part in Victor Fleming's Joan of Arc in 1948. Accustomed to playing villains (such as the diabolical Fu Manchu), the actor sports a jet-black goatee and wears plate armor and a helmet over a camail. He manages to portray an eerie knight in the close-ups he is sparingly given, but his character remains mute throughout the film. Gilles de Rais just listens to La Hire (Ward Bond) when the latter, initially suspicious of Joan of Arc (Ingrid Bergman), launches into a verbal joust with her. During the climactic battle in Orleans, Gilles de Rais disappears from the screen. He appears one last time, cheering on King Charles VII of France (José Ferrer) during his coronation.

David Oxley played the part of Gilles de Rais alias "Bluebeard" in Otto Preminger's 1957 film version of Shaw's play, Saint Joan. Gilles de Rais takes the Dauphin's place on the throne to deceive Joan of Arc. However, when she enters the Château de Chinon, the Maid recognizes the imposture. The Archbishop of Reims pragmatically interprets this as a "miracle", in other words, as "an event that creates faith".

Sandrine Bonnaire (Joan of Arc) and Bruno Wolkowitch (Gilles de Rais) in a scene from Joan the Maid, a 1994 film directed by Jacques Rivette

Bruno Wolkowitch portrayed the character, referred to here as "Gilles de Laval", in Jacques Rivette's Joan the Maid in 1994. During the siege of Orléans, Gilles de Rais first approaches Joan of Arc (Sandrine Bonnaire) with mystical admiration: "I knew it. You are of God and not of men." He then prostrates himself before her, proclaiming in Latin and then in French that she is "the angel Raphael sent to save us." When he asks for her hand to kiss, Joan of Arc tells him to stop, specifying that she is "none of that."

Later, the Maid strives to overcome the captains' lack of resolve as they hesitate before launching the assault. She urges them to remain pure if they wish to prevail, a Christ-like message that provokes mixed reactions: some war leaders laugh, while others are moved, like Gilles de Rais, who exclaims, "Listen to her! It is because of our sins that we have been defeated, and she—she is our redeemer..." In this scene, the camera isolates Gilles de Laval from his comrades in arms by framing him in perspective, first between Joan of Arc and the Bastard of Orléans, and then between Joan and La Hire. Gilles de Rais's alterity — he is never shot in close-up and is "clad in a black cloak lined with red" — thus becomes apparent, despite his repeated declarations of loyalty to the Maid.

In the second part of Jacques Rivette's film, Joan of Arc remains skeptical about the relic that Gilles de Rais bought at great cost. The French army is eventually disbanded following the failure of the siege of Paris. Taking leave of the Maid, Gilles de Rais informs her that he has ordered a mystery play to celebrate their feats of war, although it turns out to be "more expensive than expected. Everything is more expensive than expected." He remarks to Joan that she is "not an angel after all", which she confirms with a smile. Gilles de Rais retorts that he feels "robbed" all the same, then tells the Maid that she has "changed". "I don't think so", says Joan of Arc. Gilles de Rais replies: "Then it's me. Farewell".

Vincent Cassel played the part in Luc Besson's The Messenger: The Story of Joan of Arc in 1999. "Besson completely and deliberately obscured the dark, tortured, monstrous side of Gilles de Rais", explains actor Pascal Greggory, who plays the Duke of Alençon in the film. Costume designer Catherine Leterrier designed "a very elegant black suit of armor" to reflect Gilles de Rais' "character and history", in particular "his disturbing side".

Director Bruno Dumont hired a non-professional actor named Julien Manier to play Gilles de Rais in his film Joan of Arc (2019), an adaptation of Charles Péguy's play Jeanne d'Arc (1897). Manier, said Dumont, is "a young guy from Saint-Omer, gothic [...] fragile, with a weak voice and at the same time a very strong face, very hard and very impressive. And I like this contradiction". Far from an imposing man with a devilish beard, the actor plays a juvenile, frail baron who preaches looting to the soldiers to give them heart and soul. An expression of Péguy's pessimism, Gilles de Rais' brutal, cynical rhetoric clashes with the sense of honor and divine love of Joan of Arc's character. He who says such things can only be "the last of men", in her words.

On television, Benoît Brione played the part in Catherine, a French television series directed by Marion Sarraut, based on Juliette Benzoni's Catherine, a series of historical romance novels. Thereafter, Vincent Gauthier played the part in Jeanne d'Arc, le pouvoir et l'innocence, a French television series directed by Pierre Badel, adapted from the eponymous novel by Pierre Moinot.

=== Abandoned film projects ===
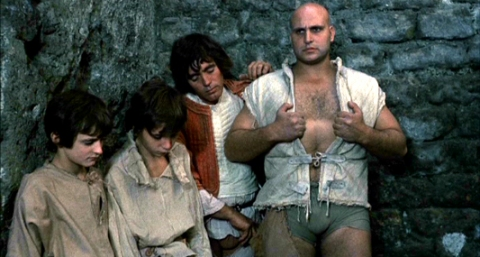
A scene from Pier Paolo Pasolini's The Decameron (1971)

Pier Paolo Pasolini was scouting out locations in the Loire Valley for the production of The Decameron in 1970. He was given a book by anthropologist Franco Cagnetta on Gilles de Rais during a debate with students at the University of Tours. The Italian filmmaker "thought about [a movie] seriously for a few weeks" but he gave up, "caught up in the Trilogy of Life". Pasolini specifies that he wanted to portray a jovial sexuality as "compensation for repression" and not to make a "cruel" film, as would later be the case in Salò, or the 120 Days of Sodom, where sexual intercourse, depicted as "obligatory and ugly", now represents "the reduction of the body to a thing."

After shooting The Phantom of Liberty (1974), Luis Buñuel worked with screenwriter Jean-Claude Carrière on a contemporary transposition of Joris-Karl Huysmans' novel Là-bas. Gérard Depardieu agreed to play Gilles de Rais during the film's medieval sequences. However, the director – already elderly at the time – abandoned the project, anticipating the demanding nature of the shooting, which would require imposing historical reconstructions. According to Jean-Claude Carrière, Buñuel also considered the time for scandals to be over. For example, the filmmaker could "neither take [the presence of the Devil] seriously, nor resolutely mock it", deeming the modern black mass sequence perpetrated by Canon Docre "superfluous and easy".

Author of the erotic film Immoral Tales (1974), one segment of which features Countess Elizabeth Báthory, the Polish director Walerian Borowczyk considered making another anthology film. One of the segments would have focused on the trial of Gilles de Rais in 1440. He offered Udo Kier the role of the bloody baron, but the project did not come to fruition. The director later cast the German actor as another iconic criminal figure, Jack the Ripper, in the film Lulu (1980).

In the 1980s, after directing L'Amour braque, Andrzej Zulawski set up a company with producer Christian Ferry to make Celle qui danse, a biographical film about Joan of Arc, in which Sophie Marceau would play the part. The filmmaker was particularly interested in the relationship between the Maid and Gilles de Rais, to whom he had already devoted a text in Les Choses de la chair, a book published in 1981. Zulawski saw Joan of Arc as "the first of the movie stars, (...) inhabited by God and therefore dancing on all those battlefields", sums up screenwriter Nicolas Boukhrief. He also explains the project's failure on account of its enormity, as well as the fears of backers regarding the director's treatment of the French "national icon".

=== Films loosely based on Gilles de Rais' story ===
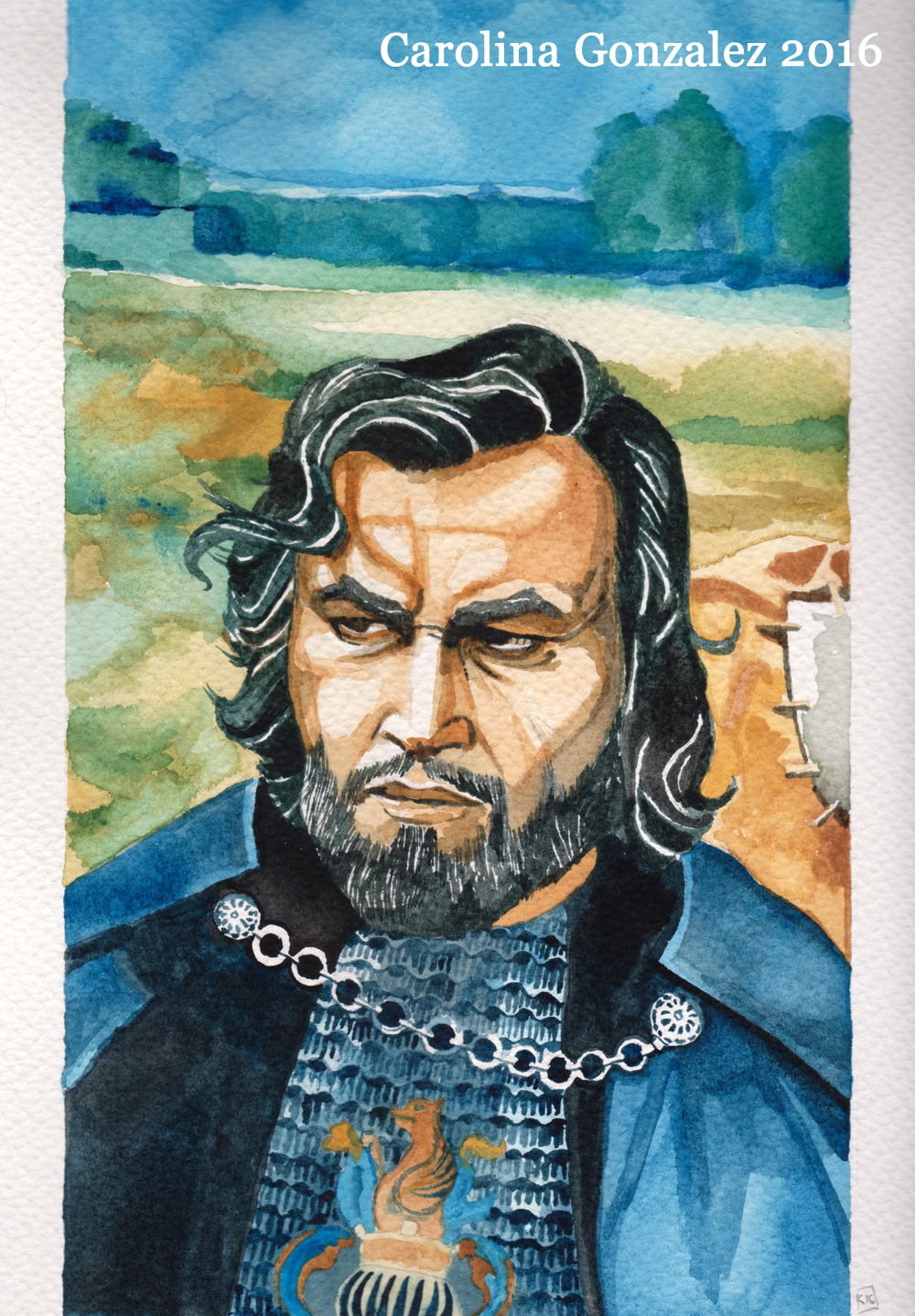
Portrait of Paul Naschy as Alaric de Marnac

A familiar figure in Spanish horror films, Paul Naschy plays a knight loosely inspired by Gilles de Rais' occult life and downfall in three movies: Horror Rises from the Tomb (1972), El Mariscal del Infierno (1974) and Panic Beats (1983). The Spanish actor considers these variations on the same character (successively named Alaric de Marnac and Gilles de Lancré) to be his most "totemic" creation.

In 1986, the Spanish director Agusti Villaronga directed the film In a Glass Cage. He claims to have been inspired by Georges Bataille's book on Gilles de Rais to create the character of Klaus, a former Nazi torturer, pedophile and child killer.

=== Anime ===
Gilles de Rais / Caster in the anime Fate/Zero

Gilles de Rais appears in the various Japanese media of the Fate franchise under a double guise: that of the noble knight of the "Saber" character class, Joan of Arc's valiant comrade-in-arms, and that of the sadistic pedophile murderer of the "Caster" character class, an aspect he adopts in particular in the anime Fate/Zero. This adaptation of the eponymous light novel recounts a contemporary war between magicians vying for the Holy Grail through their "Servants", the reincarnated souls of various historical or mythical figures.

In the context of this anime, Gilles de Rais turned his back on the Church after Joan of Arc's execution in 1431, throwing himself wholeheartedly into occultism and murderous depravities for eight long years. He ended up on the scaffold at the instigation of his enemies driven by greed rather than any concern for justice. A few centuries later, a young Japanese serial killer named Ryūnosuke Uryū fortuitously summons the spirit of the hanged marshal. Gilles de Rais manifests himself as a "servant" of the "Caster" type, a character class versed in the magical arts. He acquires a bulging appearance, calls himself "Bluebeard", summons eldritch horrors and continues his crimes under the admiring gaze of his mortal master, with whom he establishes a relationship of friendship and trust, while remaining haunted by the memory of Joan of Arc. As an outsider to the Holy Grail War, Caster is fascinated by the Servant Saber, a female incarnation of King Arthur, in whom he wrongly believes he recognizes the Maid of Orleans.

Alternative versions of Gilles de Rais' character as a sorcerer evolving in a fantasy world appear in anime such as Rage of Bahamut and Ulysses: Jeanne d'Arc and the Alchemist Knight, in which the protagonist Montmorency-Laval endows the young peasant girl Joan with supernatural powers, granting her the philosopher's stone.

== Theater ==
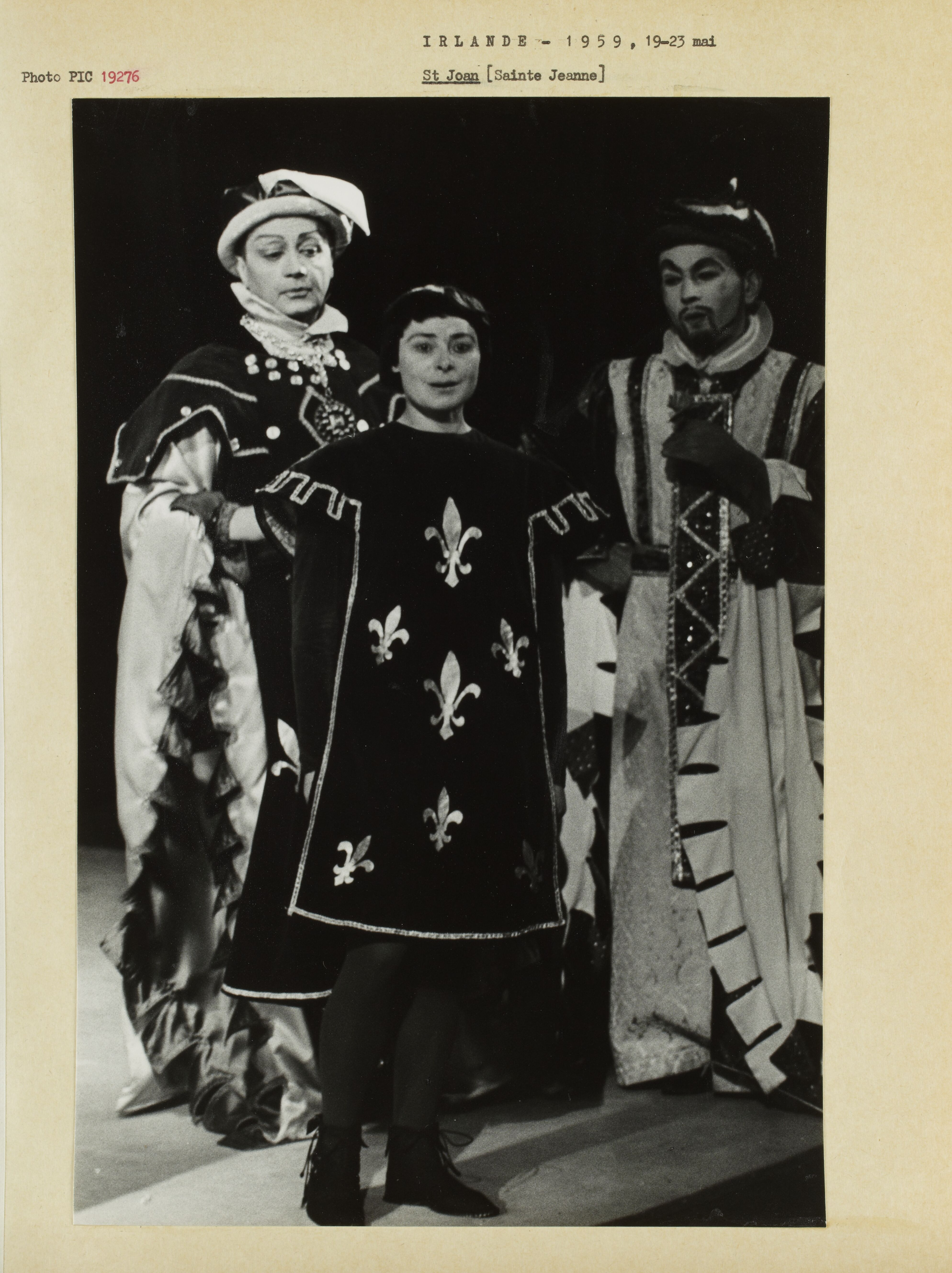
Micheál Mac Liammóir (King Charles VII), Siobhán McKenna (Joan of Arc) and Patrick Bedford (Gilles de Rais) performing George Bernard Shaw's play Saint Joan, 1959

- In the 1923 premiere production of George Bernard Shaw's Saint Joan, the part of Gilles de Rais was played by Walton Butterfield. Subsequent Broadway productions saw David Vivian (1936), Frederic Warriner (1951), Paul Sparer (1956), Oswald Laurence (1962), Richard Clarke (1968), Kenneth Gray (1977), Bill Camp (1993), and Max Gordon Moore (2018) in the role.
- This Mortal Coil was a 1982 play by William Kramer that focused on Gilles de Rais as its primary character. Ron Mitchell played the part in the premiere production at Boston's Theater Loft.

== Music ==
- La Passion de Gilles, opera (French libretto), 1983, music: Philippe Boesmans, libretto: Pierre Mertens based on his 1982 play (same title).
- Zurich-based avant-garde extreme metal band Celtic Frost recorded a song about Gilles de Rais called "Into the crypts of Rays" on their 1984 extended play album Morbid Tales.
- Cradle of Filth's album Godspeed on the Devil's Thunder is centered on the life of Gilles de Rais.
- In 2012, British synth-pop duo Pet Shop Boys released a song called Hell, which mentions various famous people who have made a name for themselves in history through acts of violence, including Gilles de Rais.

== Games ==
In Castlevania: Legacy of Darkness and Castlevania 64, Gilles de Rais is portrayed as an immortal vampire and loyal follower of Dracula. In Castlevania 64, he disguises himself as Dracula to deceive those who oppose his master.

Gilles de Rais appears with purple hair and an impassive expression in Jeanne d'Arc, a tactical role-playing game that blends history and fantasy. He also appears in Bladestorm: The Hundred Years' War, a real-time strategy game.

In the free-to-play role-playing video game Fate/Grand Order, the player encounters Gilles de Rais during the chapter "First Singularity: Hundred Years' War of the Evil Dragons – Orléans", set in an alternate version of France in 1431. Gilles de Rais attempts to resurrect Joan of Arc through the Holy Grail but instead brings about the creation of Jeanne d'Arc (Alter), a corrupted version who leads an army of dragons against France before being defeated by the player and allied Servants.
