= Polyeucte (disambiguation) =

Polyeucte drama by Pierre Corneille

- Polyeucte (opera), Charles Gounod 1878
- Polyeucte, ouverture by Paul Dukas 1891
- Polyeucte, film Camille de Morlhon 1910
