= Henri Pouctal =

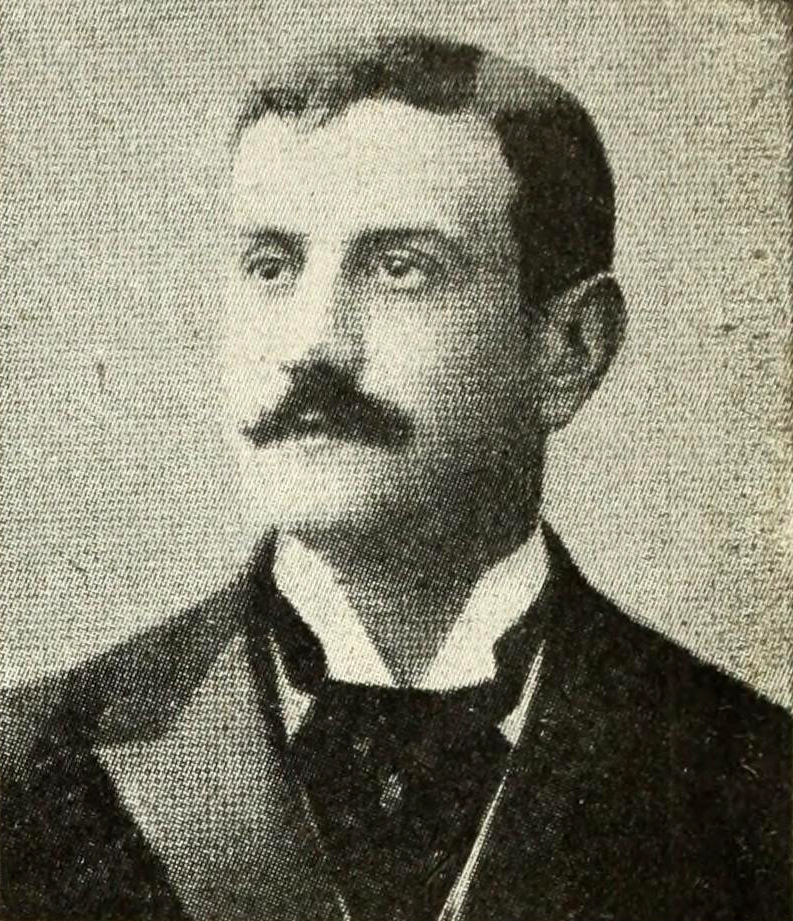
- Born: c. 1856; La Ferté-sous-Jouarre, Seine-et-Marne, France
- Died: February 3, 1922 (aged 65–66); Paris, France
- Occupations: Film director, actor, screenwriter, art director
- Years active: 1908—1922

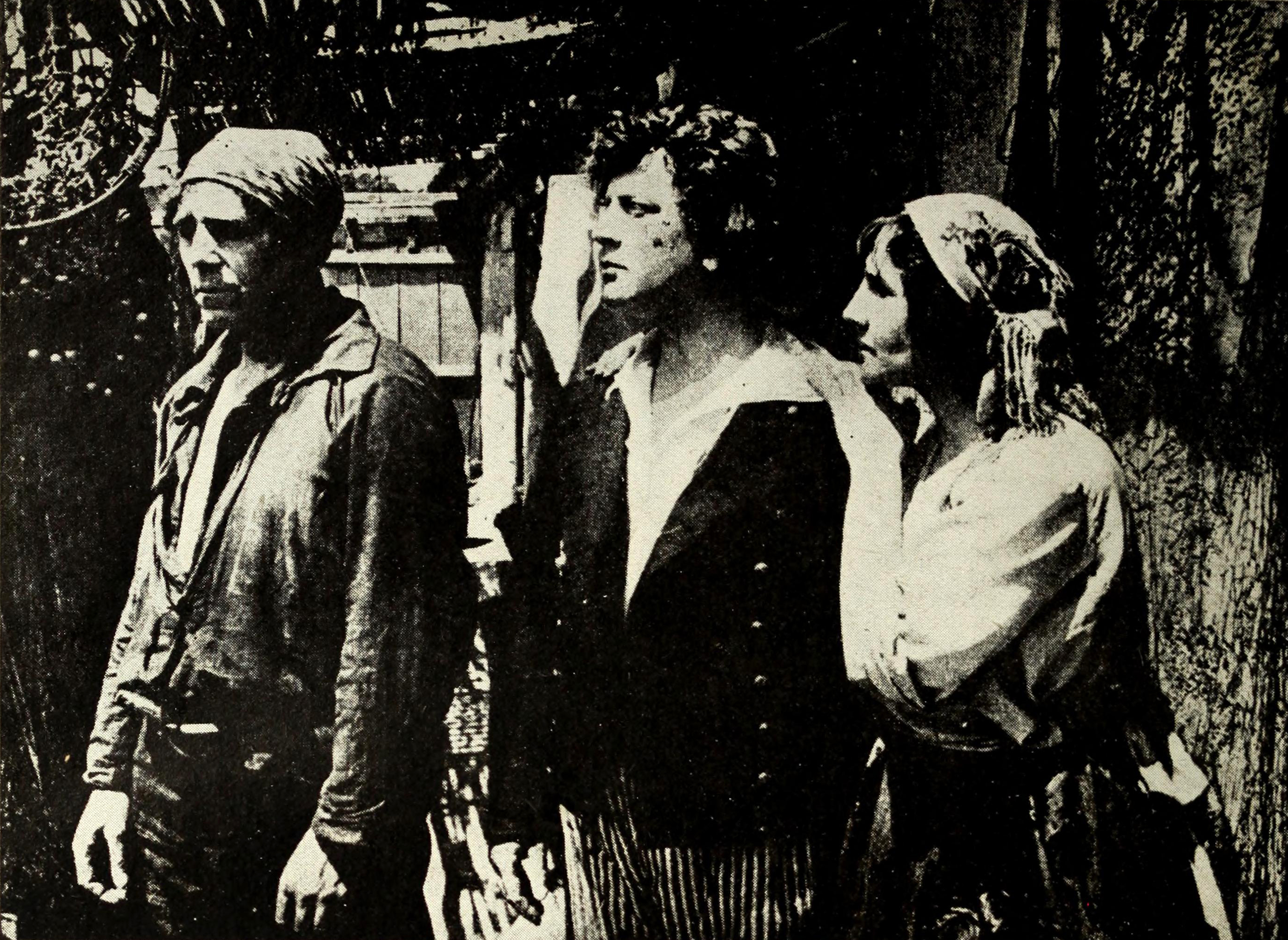
Le Comte de Monte-Cristo (1917) : center, Léon Mathot (Dantès); right, Nelly Cormon (Mercédès).

Henri Pouctal (c. 1856 – 3 February 1922) was an early French silent film director, screenwriter, and actor of the stage and film. He is best known for his directorship on silent films of the 1910s, notably Alsace (1916) or Chantecoq (1916), and The Count of Monte Cristo serials in 1918.

He was a stage actor at the Théâtre de l'Odéon, and André Antoine's Théâtre Libre. The first film directed by him was Le Curé de Campagne in 1908. Pouctal directed about 100 films between 1908 and 1922. By 1913, he became the artistic director of Le Film d'Art production company.

== Filmography ==
- Le Curé de Campagne (1908)
- A Conquest (1911)
- La Dame aux Camélias (1912)
- The Tragedy of the Mine (1913)
- La Fille du Boche (1915)
- La Menace (1915)
- Alsace (1916)
- Chantecoq (1916)
- The Count of Monte Cristo (1918)
- Travail (1920), based on the book, Travail (1901) by Emile Zola
- Gigolette (1920)
- The Crime of Bouif (1922)
- Saint Joan the Maid (1929)
