= Francis the First (film) =

1937 film

- Directed by: Christian-Jaque
- Written by: Paul Fékété
- Produced by: Jules Calamy
- Starring: Fernandel; Mona Goya; Alexandre Rignault
- Cinematography: Marcel Lucien
- Edited by: André Versein
- Music by: René Sylviano
- Production company: Productions Calamy
- Distributed by: Gray-Film
- Release date: 17 February 1937
- Running time: 100 minutes
- Country: France
- Language: French

Francis the First (French: François Premier) is a 1937 French historical comedy film directed by Christian-Jaque and starring Fernandel, Mona Goya and Alexandre Rignault. It was shot at the Cité Elgé studios in Paris. The film's sets were designed by the art director Pierre Schild.

== Synopsis ==
Honorin is the stage manager at a theatre featuring a play set during the reign of Francis I. When an actor is indisposed, he has to step into his role and suffers badly from stage fright. A colleague attempts to use hypnotism to calm his nerves, but instead he falls into a trance and transported several hundred years back in time. Knowing what is to come, he is able to predict the future, which soon leads to accusations of witchcraft.

== Cast ==
- Fernandel as Honorin
- Mona Goya as Elsa / Madeleine Ferron
- Alexandre Rignault as Henri VIII
- Henri Bosc as Luigi Cascaroni / Jean Ferron
- Aimé Simon-Girard as François 1er
- Alice Tissot as Madame Cascaroni / Dame Alfredine
- Charles Lemontier as La Palice
- Alexandre Mihalesco as Cagliostro
- Jean Sinoël as Le Fantôme
- René Génin as Cascaroni / L'aubergiste
- Henri Valbel as Le Padre
- Paul Delon as Duc de Montmorency
- Jean Marconi as Lautrec
- Nicolas Amato as Le Chevalier Bayard
- Jacques Vitry as Le Héraut
- Jeanne Lamy as Duchesse de Montmorency
- Claire Saint-Hilaire as Madame de Monchenut

== Bibliography ==
- Bessy, Maurice & Chirat, Raymond. Histoire du cinéma français: 1935-1939. Pygmalion, 1986.
- Crisp, Colin. Genre, Myth and Convention in the French Cinema, 1929-1939. Indiana University Press, 2002.
- Oscherwitz, Dayna & Higgins, MaryEllen . The A to Z of French Cinema. Scarecrow Press, 2009.
- Rège, Philippe. Encyclopedia of French Film Directors, Volume 1. Scarecrow Press, 2009.
