= Chantecoq (film) =

- Directed by: Henri Pouctal
- Starring: Claude Mérelle; Gaston Michel; Julien Clément (fr)
- Production company: Gaumont
- Release date: 1916
- Running time: 81 minutes
- Country: France
- Language: French

Chantecoq A.K.A. L'espionne de Guillaume (Wilhelm's Spy) is a 1916 French spy film directed by Henri Pouctal, starring Claude Mérelle, Gaston Michel and Julien Clément. It is about an amateur detective unmasking a group of German spies in France on the eve of World War I. The scenario of the film is based on the novel L'espionne de Guillaume by Arthur Bernède.

== Plot ==
Chantecoq (1916)

On the eve of World War I, three undercover German spies in France are sabotaging the work of an explosive factory in Bar le Duc and are trying to steal the secret formula of a new explosive. The ringleader, Emma Luckner, nicknamed The Spy of Wilhelm, has direct access to Kaiser Wilhelm II, and often disguises as a widow. She is assisted by Colonel von Reitzer, undercover as Gerfaut, foreman at the explosive factory, and Captain Ulrich von Herfeld, undercover as Marois, one of the richest owners of Bar-le-Duc. Engineer Vallier, the deputy director of the factory and Yvonne, the daughter of the factory's director Mr. Richard, are in love but Mr. Richard has promised her hand to Marois. In Paris, detective Chantecoq is given the mission to find out who is sabotaging the work of the factory.

Chantecoq starts his investigations in Bar le Duc disguised as a peasant. The same evening Gerfaut, after having bombed the factory sends an anonymous note to Richard asking him to meet him at a chapel in ruins. There he offers him money for the formula. Richard, outraged attacks him and is shot dead by accomplices of Gerfaut. Later, Chantecoq finds Richard's body hidden near the ruined chapel.

Following Richard's murder, Gerfaut goes to Paris, disguised as Richard, to meet inventor Aubry in order to get the explosive formula. Rather than giving to him, Aubry proposes to go with him to Bar le Duc and start together the production. Before the train journey takes place, Aubry is warned by Chantecoq that Richard is dead and that he has met an imposter. They agree that Chantecoq will disguise as Aubry and travel with the fake Richard to try to confound him. Emma disguised as a widow takes place in the same compartment as Gerfaut and Chantecoq and together the two spies overpower him. They are very happy to discover that Aubry is in fact their worst enemy Chantecoq and they ship him to Germany in a trunk.

Meanwhile, in Bar le Duc, the police has found Richard's body. Gerfaut tells the police that Vallier was the murderer and organises a demonstration of workers accusing Gerfaut. The police finds in Vallier's office documents proving his contacts with a foreign power. Despite his protests that the documents are fake, he his arrested for murder and high treason.

In Germany, Chantecoq is presented to the Crown Prince who is convinced he will be able to convince him to give the explosive formula to the Germans. Chantecoq pretends he agrees but Emma does not believe him and tries to have him poisoned. Chantecoq let his guard eat the food presented to him and they both die. He complains to the Crown Prince who has Emma sent back to France. There, together with Gerfaut and Marois, they force open Aubry's safe to steal the formula. But Aubry had booby-trapped the safe causing Marois to be killed and Gerfaut and Emma arrested.

Chantecoq is invited to have lunch with the Crown Prince on the terrasse of one his castles overlooking a lake separating Germany from Switzerland. Chantecoq knocks out his host with a bottle and escapes on a rowboat. He first exults over his easy escape but is rapidly disillusioned when the Prince's men start shooting at him and chase him with a speed boat. Just before being caught, Chantecoq jumps into the water.

In Paris, at Vallier's criminal trial, Gerfaut renews his accusations. Aubry tries to defend Vallier, convinced that a plot is preventing Chantecoq from demonstrating his innocence. Chantecoq finally appears, greeted by the crowd and Vallier is acquitted. In an epilogue, Chantecoq is sitting in a garden with his friends and a flashback shows how he managed to arrive in Switzerland.

== Production and reception ==
The film was shot in France during the second year of World War I, during the Battle of Verdun. The location of the action is Bar le Duc was highly symbolic given that Verdun was nearly surrounded by the Germans and the only road connecting it to the rest of France was the road to Bar le Duc, which was the place where supplies and men were concentrated before being sent to the front. Some sources indicate that Abel Gance was Pouctal's location manager for this film.

Georges Sadoul mentions in his Dictionnaire des cinéastes that according to film critic Louis Delluc Henri Pouctal was one of the best French film directors in the period before the War . However, Delluc did not find that Chantecoq was his best film.

According to Richard Abel, Chantecoq was one of the most popular film detectives during the war.
