= Simone (1918 film) =

- Directed by: Camille de Morlhon
- Written by: Eugène Brieux (play); Camille de Morlhon
- Cinematography: Alphonse Gibory
- Production company: Pathé Frères
- Distributed by: Pathé Frères
- Release date: 12 April 1918
- Country: France
- Languages: Silent; French intertitles

Simone is a 1918 French silent drama film directed by Camille de Morlhon. It was remade in 1926.

== Cast ==
- Edmond Duquesne
- Armand Tallier
- Lilian Greuze
- Simone Genevois as young Simone de Sergeac
- Romuald Joubé
- Maurice Escande as Michel Mignier
- Marie-Laure
- Garay
- Henri Valbel
- Joly
- Régnier

== Bibliography ==
- Goble, Alan. The Complete Index to Literary Sources in Film. Walter de Gruyter, 1999.
