= Marion Delorme (film) =

- Directed by: Henry Krauss
- Based on: Marion de Lorme by Victor Hugo
- Starring: Pierre Renoir; Nelly Cormon; Jean Worms
- Production company: Pathé Frères
- Distributed by: Pathé Frères
- Release date: 11 October 1918
- Country: France
- Languages: Silent; French intertitles

Marion Delorme is a 1918 French silent historical drama film directed by Henry Krauss and starring Pierre Renoir, Nelly Cormon and Jean Worms. It is an adaptation of Victor Hugo's play Marion de Lorme, itself inspired by the life of the courtesan Marion Delorme. Albert Capellani had directed an earlier short film version of the play in 1912.

== Main cast ==
- Pierre Renoir as Le roi Louis XIII
- Nelly Cormon as La courtisane Marion Delorme
- Jean Worms as Didier
- Armand Tallier as Gaspard de Saverny
- Pierre Alcover as Laffemas

== Bibliography ==
- Goble, Alan. The Complete Index to Literary Sources in Film. Walter de Gruyter, 1999.
