= The Dream (1931 film) =

1931 film

- Directed by: Jacques de Baroncelli
- Written by: Jean-Jacques Bernard
- Based on: The Dream by Emile Zola
- Produced by: Bernard Natan; Emile Natan
- Starring: Simone Genevois; Jaque Catelain; Jean Joffre
- Cinematography: Louis Chaix
- Edited by: Marthe Poncin
- Music by: Roland Manuel
- Production company: Pathé-Natan
- Distributed by: Pathé-Natan
- Release date: 23 July 1931
- Running time: 73 minutes
- Country: France
- Language: French

The Dream (French: Le rêve) is a 1931 French drama film directed by Jacques de Baroncelli and starring Simone Genevois, Jaque Catelain and Jean Joffre. It is based on the 1888 novel of the same title by Emile Zola. It was shot at Pathé's Joinville Studios in Paris. The film's sets were designed by the art director Robert Gys.

== Cast ==
- Simone Genevois as Angélique
- Jaque Catelain as Félicien
- Charles Le Bargy as Monsieur de Hautecoeur
- Jean Joffre as L'abbé Cornille
- Germaine Dermoz as Hubertine
- Gilberte Savary as Angélique enfant
- Paul Amiot as Hubert
- Raymond Galle as Le médecin

== Bibliography ==
- Goble, Alan. The Complete Index to Literary Sources in Film. Walter de Gruyter, 1999.
- Slavin, David Henry . Colonial Cinema and Imperial France, 1919–1939: White Blind Spots, Male Fantasies, Settler Myths. JHU Press, 2001.
