= Studio des Ursulines =

Cinema in Paris, France

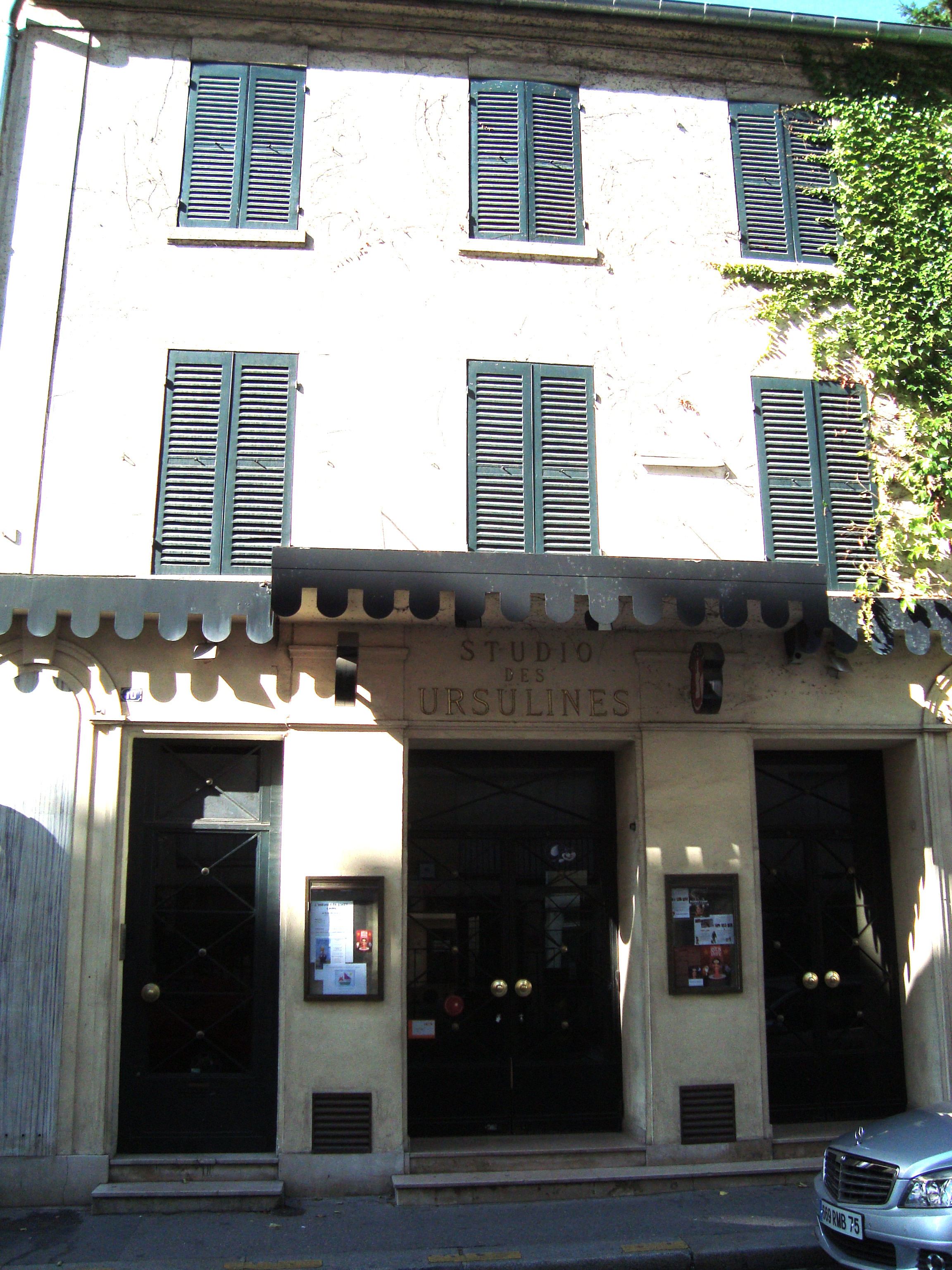
- Studio des Ursulines, Paris.
- Interactive map of Studio des Ursulines
- Address: 10 rue des Ursulines, 5th arrondissement, Paris, France
- Coordinates: 48°50′34″N 2°20′31″E
- Capacity: 122
- Type: Cinema
- Events: Art & Essai, animation, cinéclub

Construction
- Opened: January 21, 1926

Website
- www.studiodesursulines.com

The Studio des Ursulines is a cinema in the 5th arrondissement of Paris, at No.10, Rue des Ursulines. It is one of the oldest cinemas in Paris to have kept its facade and founder's vision: to offer a venue for art and experimental cinema. Gilles Renouard of Paris Cinéphile describes it as 'an astonishing experience' for its nostalgic associations and being able to be within 3 metres of the screen if you sit in the balcony. It has 1 screen.

== History ==
=== Founding ===
In 1925, actors Armand Tallier and Laurence Myrga choose the small rue des Ursulines to establish a cinema to specialize in avant-garde films and catered to art house audiences. Thus, the first avant-garde cinema in France was born, a precursor to the now established system of "Art et Essai."

The cinema opened January 21, 1926. Films by André Breton, Man Ray, Fernand Léger, René Clair and Robert Desnos were shown.

=== Premieres ===
Between January 1926 and December 1957, a wide range of now-classic films premiered at the theater, such as René Clair's Le Voyage Imaginaire, Von Stroheim’s Greed, Von Sternberg’s The Blue Angel, Roberto Rossellini’s’ Amore and Howard Hawks A Girl in Every Port. In 1958 it showed work by Satyajit Ray, Andrzej Wajda, Ingmar Bergman and Luis Buñuel.

It is one of two cinemas in central Paris whose facades have not been significantly altered.

=== The scandal of 1928 ===
In 1928, it premiered the first film of Germaine Dulac, taken from a story by Antonin Artaud, The Seashell and the Clergyman. The film was heckled by the surrealists André Breton and Louis Aragon, leading to a fight that stopped the screening. Tallier did not call the police and the film screened a few weeks later. Tallier became associated in the 1950s with the creation of the Art et Essai, movement with the birth of l’AFCAE (Association Française des Cinémas d’Art & d’Essai) in 1955.

== Twenty-first century ==
Since March 2003, the majority of the cinema's daytime programming is aimed at the 'Art & Essai’ public, especially younger audiences. In the evening animation and cinéclub (film club) screenings dominate.

== In film ==
- One of the last scenes of François Truffaut’s Jules et Jim takes place at the Studio des Ursulines, where the three main characters meet by chance.
- The end of the film Chantrapas and a scene in Après mai were shot there.
