= Armand Tallier =

French actor (1887-1958)

- Born: Armand Urbain Édouard Espitallier; 6 August 1887; Marseille, France
- Died: 1 March 1958 (aged 40); Paris, France
- Occupations: Actor, theatre director
- Years active: 1911-1926 (film)

Armand Tallier (6 August 1887 – 1 March 1958) was a French stage and film actor of the silent era. In 1925 he established a small cinema in Paris, the Studio des Ursulines, to secure screenings of avant garde films that would struggle to get a mainstream release.

== Selected filmography ==
- Blanchette (1912)
- The Torture of Silence (1917)
- Marion Delorme (1918)
- Simone (1918)
- Mathias Sandorf (1921)

== Bibliography ==
- Goble, Alan. The Complete Index to Literary Sources in Film. Walter de Gruyter, 1999.
- Hagener, Malte. Moving Forward, Looking Back: The European Avant-garde and the Invention of Film Culture, 1919-1939. Amsterdam University Press, 2007.
