= Marion de Lorme (Hugo) =

1828 play in five acts written by Victor Hugo

Marion de Lorme is a play in five acts, written in 1828 by Victor Hugo. It is about the famous French courtesan of that name, who lived under the reign of Louis XIII. The play was first performed in 1831 at the Théâtre de la Porte Saint-Martin, but was later prohibited by King Charles X.

== Synopsis ==
=== Act I ===
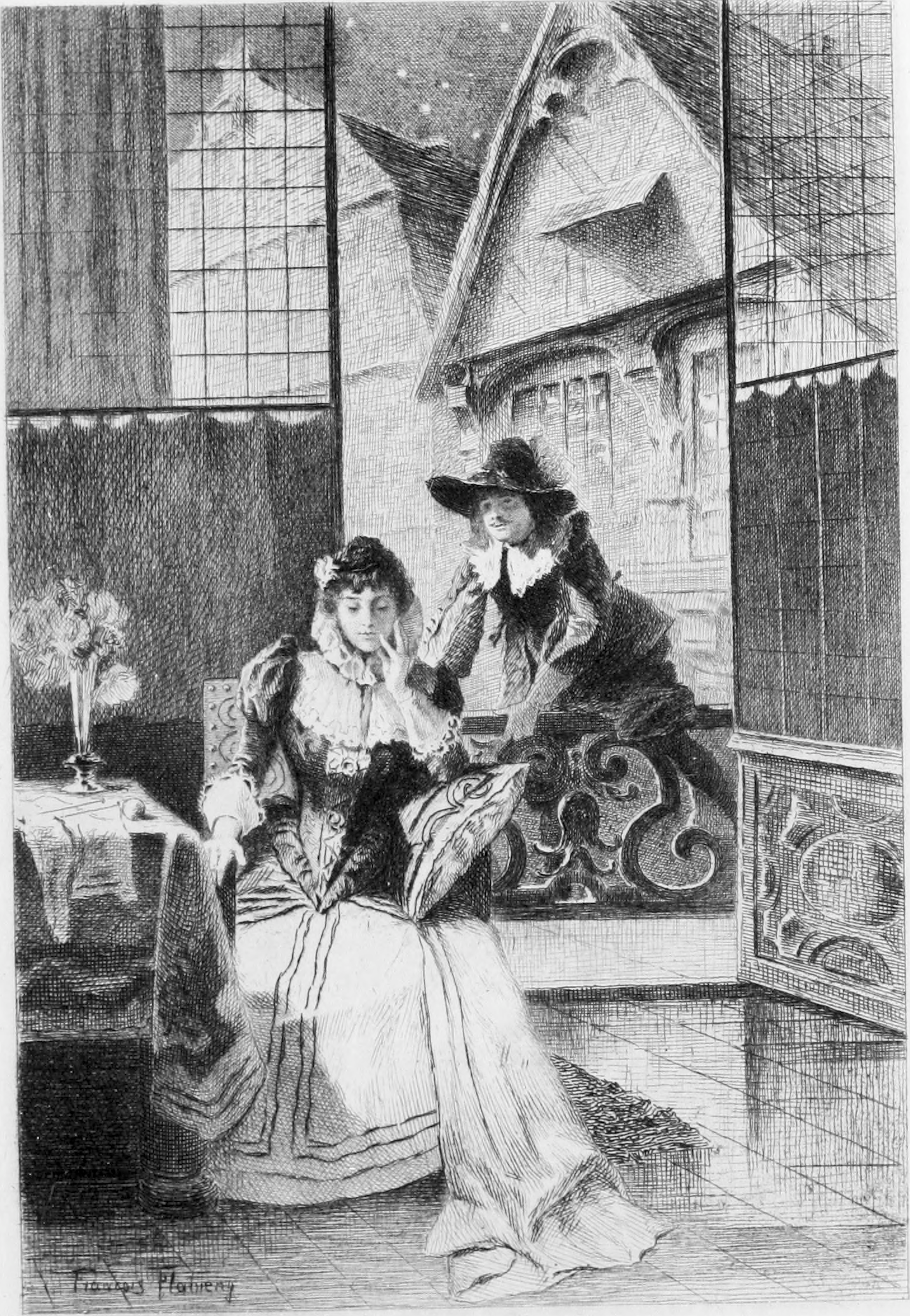
Didier visits Marion de Lorme in her bedchamber.

The Rendezvous. The play opens in 1638, in Blois, in the bedchamber of Marion De Lorme. Marion, famous Parisian courtesan, left the capital two months prior, to the despair of her lovers and admirers, and took refuge in Blois. Pressed by Saverny, who found her, she confesses that she has an appointment with a man named Didier who does not know who she is, and she knows nothing of his identity. She urges Saverny to leave. Didier arrives and confesses his love to Marion; he pressures her to marry him, although he has no fortune and is a foundling without a family. To the despair of Didier, Marion hesitates, judging herself unworthy. But she seems ready to yield when Didier reveals what he thinks of Marion Delorme, the famous courtesan:

Do you know what Marion Delorme is?

A woman, of beautiful body and deformed heart!

At this moment, shouts erupt from the alley. Saverny is attacked, and Didier rushes to help him, thereby earning the Marquis' thanks.

=== Act II ===
The Encounter. The scene is the door of a cabaret, where a group of gentlemen are exchanging news from Paris. They discuss the merit of the last pieces of Corneille, voice their hatred of the omnipresent and all-powerful Cardinal Richelieu, and the disappearance of Marion De Lorme. One of them related that she was last seen in Blois, relating the events of the first act, but she has since disappeared. A crier appears who proclaims an order of the king: duels are henceforth forbidden under pain of death.

Didier arrives at the cabaret, and a quarrel sparks between him and Saverny (who did not recognize him). They begin a duel, quickly interrupted by the entry of Marion, who screams and alerts the guard. Saverny, to save himself, feigns death. Didier is arrested.

=== Act III ===
The Comedians. The scene is the château de Genlis. Saverny enters, incognito, who related to the judge Laffemas the story of his own death. But during the conversation, Saverny learns that the man he fought with was Didier and that it was Marion's lover who saved his life. Shortly afterwards, Laffemas receives a letter announcing the escape of Didier, probably accompanied by Marion. He goes after them.

Marion and Didier enter. They have hidden themselves among a troupe of traveling comedians and are given roles. Didier is desperate to flee with Marion, and asks her again to marry him. Marion is spotted by Savergny, who passes the information to Laffemas. He realizes that the fugitive he seeks must be among the actors. Didier discovers that the woman he loves is none other than Marion de Lorme, the courtesan. Revolted, he denounces himself to Laffemas, who arrests him. Saverny, in an attempt to save Didier, unmasks himself, but he is arrested too.

=== Act IV ===
The King. The scene opens in the guard room of Chambord Castle. Laffemas attempts to seduce Marion, but is refused. Marion determines to rely upon the king. Louis XIII enters, furious with Cardinal Richelieu who ousted him from power. Marion and the Marquis de Nangis (Saverny's uncle) plead for a royal pardon for the two convicts. But the king is intractable; he refuses to oppose the cardinal. Left alone with the king, L'Angély, his jester, tries to persuade the King by convincing him that the two convicts are falconers (the king is keen on hunting). At his insistence, the king, weak and undecided, relents to pardon the two men, and Marion departs with the pardon in hand.

=== Act V ===
The Cardinal. The scene is the dungeon of Beaugency. Marion, bearing royal pardon, arrives to have Dider released; but the royal pardon has been revoked by the cardinal. Confronted with Laffemas, she finally gives in, and agrees to prostitute herself to him in exchange for Didier's freedom. The thing done, she enters the courtyard where Didier and Saverny are awaiting death, but Didier, still angry and revolted because he guesses what she had to do to get there, refuses to follow her. The guards arrive to escort them away. At the last moment, Didier confesses his love to Marion, who forgives him and asks for forgiveness. The condemned march towards torture. Marion remains alone on stage, and sees the litter of the cardinal, who has just been present at the execution.

== Adaptations ==
There are two Italian operas based on this play: by Giovanni Bottesini (1862) and by Amilcare Ponchielli (1885).

In 1912 a short silent film was made directed by Albert Capellani. In 1918 a second feature-length film Marion Delorme was produced, directed by Henry Krauss and starring Pierre Renoir and Jean Worms.
