= Henri Valbel =

French actor

- Born: 19 May 1885; Paris, France
- Died: 5 June 1956 (aged 71); France
- Occupation: Actor
- Years active: 1917-1952 (film)

Henri Valbel (1885–1956) was a French film actor. Valbel was also noted for his work as voice actor.

== Selected filmography ==
- Simone (1918)
- Madonna of the Sleeping Cars (1928)
- The Divine Voyage (1929)
- The Yellow House of Rio (1931)
- The Tunnel (1933)
- Francis the First (1937)
- Forces occultes (1943)
- Girl with Grey Eyes (1945)
- The Agony of the Eagles (1952)

== Bibliography ==
- Goble, Alan. The Complete Index to Literary Sources in Film. Walter de Gruyter, 1999.
