= Jacques Vallée, Sieur Des Barreaux =

Jacques Vallée, Sieur Des Barreaux (16 December 1599 – 9 May 1673) was a French poet, born in Châteauneuf-sur-Loire. His great-uncle, Geoffroy Vallée, had been hanged in 1574 for the authorship of a book called Le Flau de la Foy. His nephew appears to have inherited his scepticism, which on one occasion nearly cost him his life; the peasants of Touraine attributed to the presence of the unbeliever an untimely frost that damaged the vines, and proposed to stone him. His authorship of the sonnet on "Penitence", by which he is generally known, has been disputed, notably by Voltaire.

Des Barreaux was apparently bisexual. Although he was later known as one of the lovers of Marion Delorme, a famous courtesan, he also was the lover of the freethinking poet Théophile de Viau, called the "King of Libertines" by Jesuit prosecutors. During his imprisonment in 1623–25 on charges of writing atheistic poems with homosexual allusions, de Viau addressed a poem to Vallée, "The Complaint of Théophile to his friend Tircis", reproaching Des Barreaux for doing little to help him. After de Viau's death in 1626, a contemporary biographer of high society, Tallement des Réaux, referred to Des Barreaux as de Viau's widow, "thus indicating that their physical relationship was common knowledge at the time."

Subsequently, Des Barreaux was a lover of the libertine poet Denis Sanguin de Saint-Pavin, the so-called "King of Sodom", "a consummate gentleman" whose aristocratic rank and social connections protected him from prosecution for his witty, homosexually themed writings. In his Pensées, Pascal refers to him in a passage about those who renounce reason and "become brute beasts".

Des Barreaux died at Chalon-sur-Saône on 9 May 1673.

See Poesies de Des Barreaux (1904), edited by F. Lachbvre.
