= Camille de Morlhon =

French film director

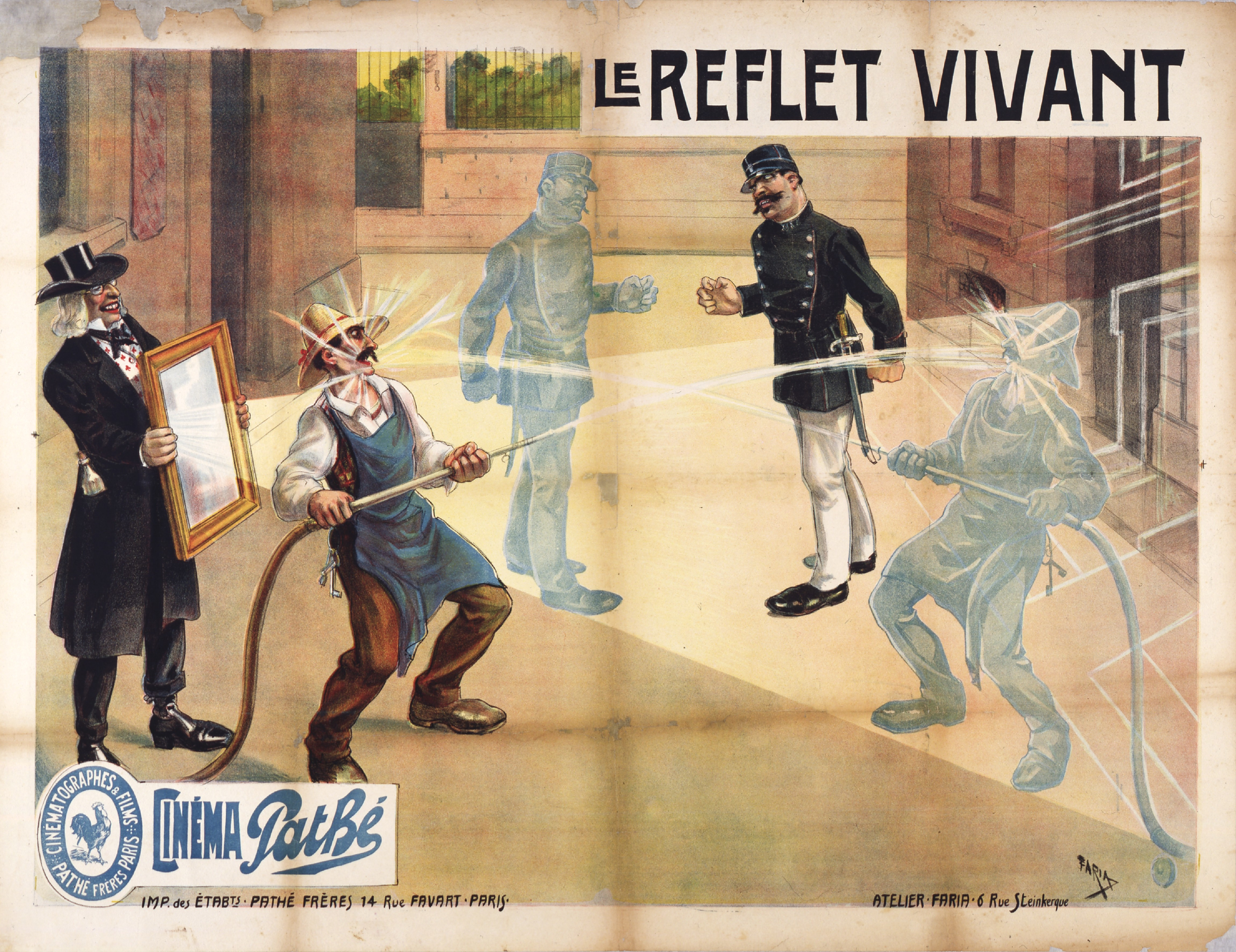
- Poster by Faria for the film Le reflet vivant directed by Camille de Morlhon, 1908. Collection EYE Film Institute Netherlands
- Born: Louis Camille Adrien Édouard de la Valette de Morlhon; 19 February 1869; Paris
- Died: 24 November 1952 (aged 83); Paris
- Occupation: Film director

Camille de Morlhon (19 February 1869 - 24 November 1952) was a French film director.

== Filmography ==
- 1908 : Les Reflets vivants
- 1908 : Quand l'amour veut
- 1908 : La Fille du gardien de phare
- 1908 : Domestique malgré lui
- 1908 : Cœur de femme
- 1908 : Pour l'uniforme
- 1908 : Benvenuto Cellini
- 1908 : Un suiveur obstiné
- 1908 : Un tic gênant
- 1909 : Une excursion incohérente
- 1909 : Le Subterfuge
- 1909 : Par l'enfant
- 1909 : Mater Dolorosa
- 1909 : La Gueuse
- 1909 : La Fiancée du prince
- 1909 : Le Fer à cheval
- 1909 : La Doublure
- 1909 : La Couronne
- 1909 : Conscience de miséreux
- 1909 : Cœur de Gavroche
- 1909 : Le Bouquet de violettes
- 1909 : Bidachou facteur
- 1909 : La Belle Niçoise
- 1909 : Bandits mondains
- 1909 : À bon chat, bon rat
- 1909 : Olivier Cromwell
- 1909 : Nous voulons un valet de chambre
- 1909 : Mademoiselle Faust
- 1909 : Le Mannequin
- 1909 : La Petite Policière
- 1909 : Les Deux Pigeons
- 1909 : La Récompense d'une bonne action
- 1909 : La Petite Rosse
- 1909 : Une leçon de charité
- 1909 : Hercule au régiment
- 1910 : Une aventure secrète de Marie-Antoinette
- 1910 : Souvenez-vous en
- 1910 : La Reine Margot after Alexandre Dumas
- 1910 : Polyeucte
- 1910 : Paillasse
- 1910 : L'Idylle du peintre
- 1910 : Bedouallah assassin (Bidouillard assassin)
- 1910 : L'Auberge rouge, after Honoré de Balzac
- 1910 : Un épisode de 1812
- 1910 : Le Roman de l'écuyère
- 1910 : Je veux mourir !
- 1910 : Le Bon Patron
- 1910 : Oliver Twist (L'Enfance d'Oliver Twist)
- 1910 : Jemmy
- 1910 : Cagliostro, Aventurier, Chimiste et Magicien
- 1910 : Le Tyran de Jérusalem
- 1910 : L'Encrier perfectionné
- 1911 : Une intrigue à la cour d'Henri VIII
- 1911 : La Savelli
- 1911 : La Ruse du petit ramoneur
- 1911 : La Rançon du roi Jean
- 1911 : Radgrune
- 1911 : Le Noël du chemineau
- 1911 : La Mémoire du cœur
- 1911 : La Légende du vieux sonneur
- 1911 : L'Histoire d'une rose
- 1911 : Fouquet, l'homme au masque de fer
- 1911 : La Fillette et la poupée
- 1911 : L'Électrocuté
- 1911 : Madame Tallien
- 1911 : Sémiramis
- 1911 : Une conspiration sous Henri III
- 1912 : Le Testament de l'oncle d'Anselme
- 1912 : Britannicus
- 1912 : L'Affaire du collier de la reine
- 1912 : Serment de fumeur
- 1912 : Les Mains d'Yvonne
- 1912 : Cireurs obstinés
- 1912 : Le Fils prodigue
- 1912 : Pour voir les moukères
- 1912 : La Belle Princesse et le marchand
- 1912 : Un mariage sous Louis XV
- 1912 : La Haine de Fatimeh
- 1912 : La Fiancée du spahi
- 1912 : Gorgibus et Sganarelle
- 1912 : L'Ambitieuse
- 1912 : La Prière de l'enfant
- 1912 : Vengeance kabyle
- 1913 : Une brute humaine
- 1913 : Le Secret de l'orpheline
- 1913 : Double face (L'Infamie d'un autre)
- 1913 : L'Escarpolette tragique
- 1913 : L'Usurier
- 1913 : Don Quichotte
- 1913 : Charmeuse (La Broyeuse de cœurs)
- 1913 : La Calomnie
- 1913 : La Fleuriste de Toneso (Les Fleurs de Toneso)
- 1914 : Vingt ans de haine
- 1914 : La Vieillesse du père Moreux
- 1914 : Le Roman du tzigane
- 1914 : Sacrifice surhumain
- 1915 : Une erreur tragique (La Marchande de fleurs)
- 1915 : L'Intrus (Sous l'uniforme)
- 1915 : Le Faux Père
- 1916 : Le Rayon mystérieux (Les Effluves funestes)
- 1916 : Cœur de Gavroche
- 1916 : Fille d'artiste
- 1916 : Le Secret de Geneviève
- 1917 : Marise (Maryse)
- 1917 : La Bourrasque (L'Orage)
- 1917 : Madeleine (Miséricorde)
- 1918 : Simone
- 1918 : Y'a plus d'enfants
- 1918 : L'Expiation
- 1919 : L'Impasse Messidor
- 1919 : Éliane
- 1919 : L'Ibis bleu
- 1920 : Fille du peuple
- 1920 : Fabienne
- 1920 : Une fleur dans les ronces
- 1923 : Tote
- 1930 : Roumanie, terre d'amour

== Bibliography ==
- Camille de Morlhon, homme de cinéma (1869-1952), par Éric Le Roy, L'Harmattan, 1997; Camille de Morlhon, homme de cinéma at Google Books
