= Marion Delorme =

17th-century French courtesan

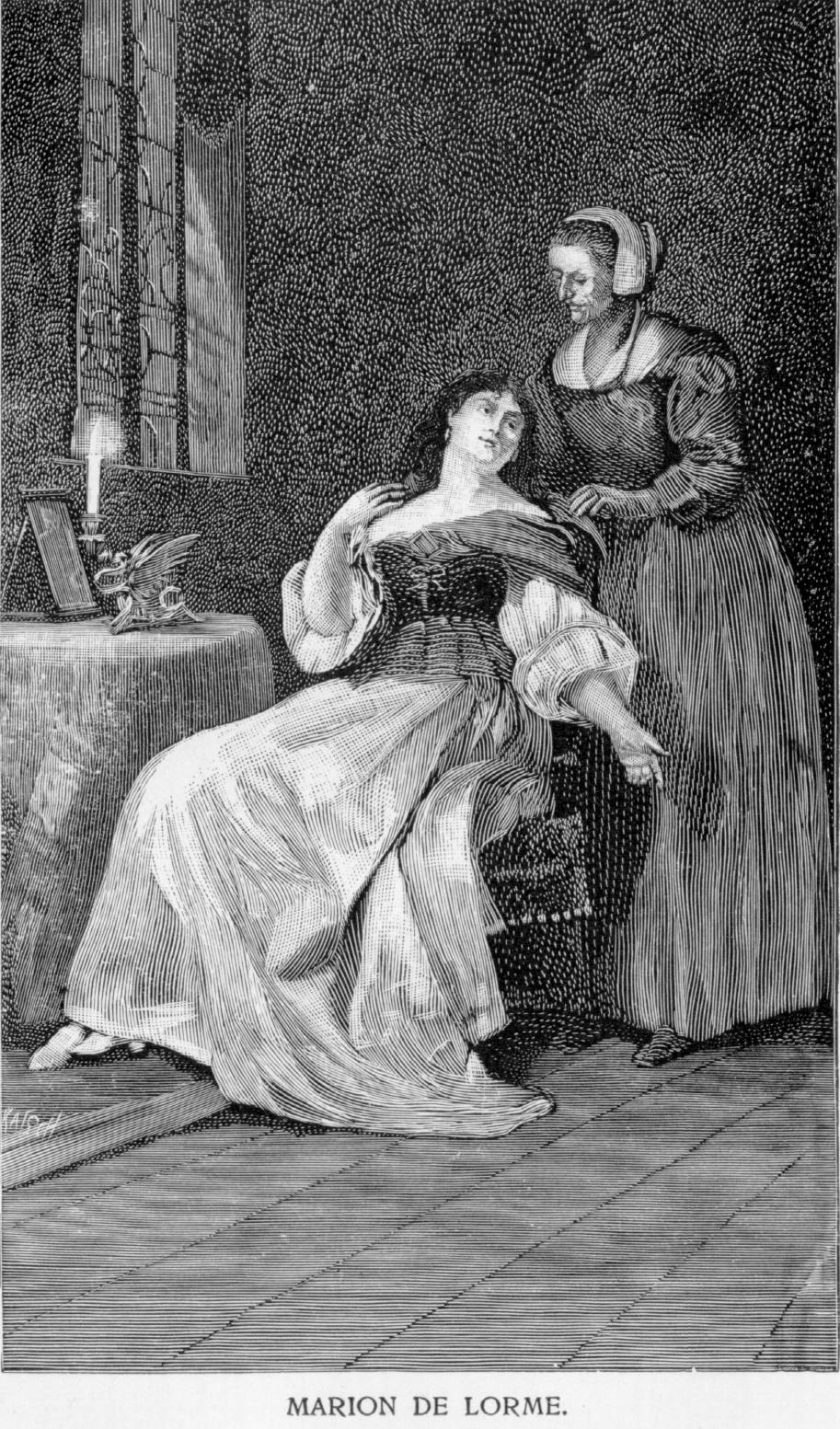
- Wood engraving of the character Marion de Lorme from Victor Hugo's play of the same name.
- Born: 3 October 1613; Champaubert, Champagne, France
- Died: 2 July 1650 (aged 36)
- Occupation: Courtesan

Marion Delorme (3 October 1613 – 2 July 1650) was a French courtesan known for her relationships with the important men of her time.

== Biography ==
She was the daughter of Jean de Lou, sieur de l'Orme, president of the treasurers of France in Champagne, and of Marie Chastelain. She was born in a wealthy family at her father's château near Champaubert. Initiated into the philosophy of physical pleasures by the epicurean and atheist Jacques Vallée, Sieur Des Barreaux, she soon left him for Henri Coiffier de Ruzé, Marquis of Cinq-Mars, at that time at the height of his popularity, and succeeded, it is said, in marrying him in secret. She began hosting a salon, and was introduced into the life of being a courtesan.

From this time Marion Delorme's salon became one of the most brilliant centres of elegant Parisian society. After the execution of Cinq-Mars, she is said to have numbered among her lovers and benefactors Charles de Saint-Évremond (1610–1703) the wit and litterateur, George Villiers, 2nd Duke of Buckingham, Louis, Grand Condé, and even Cardinal Richelieu. Under the Fronde her salon became a meeting place for the disaffected, and Mazarin is said to have sent officials to arrest her when she suddenly died. The cause of her death, and whether she actually did die then, or rather later, is still debated.

== Legend ==
Her last years have been adorned with considerable legend (cf. Eugène de Mirecourt, Confessions de Marie Delorme, Paris, 1856). It seems established that she died in 1650. But she was believed to have lived until 1706 or even 1741, after having had the most fantastic adventures, including marriage with an English lord, and an old age spent in poverty in Paris. Her name has been popularized by various authors, especially by Alfred de Vigny in his 1826 novel Cinq-Mars, by Victor Hugo in the drama Marion Delorme, and by Amilcare Ponchielli and Giovanni Bottesini in two operas of the same title, as well as Charles Gounod opera Cinq Mars.

== Bibliography ==
- P. J. Jacob, Marion Delorme et Ninon Lenclos (Paris, 1859)
- J. Péladan, Histoire et légende de Marion de Lorme (Paris, 1882).
