= Simone Genevois =

French actress (1912–1995)

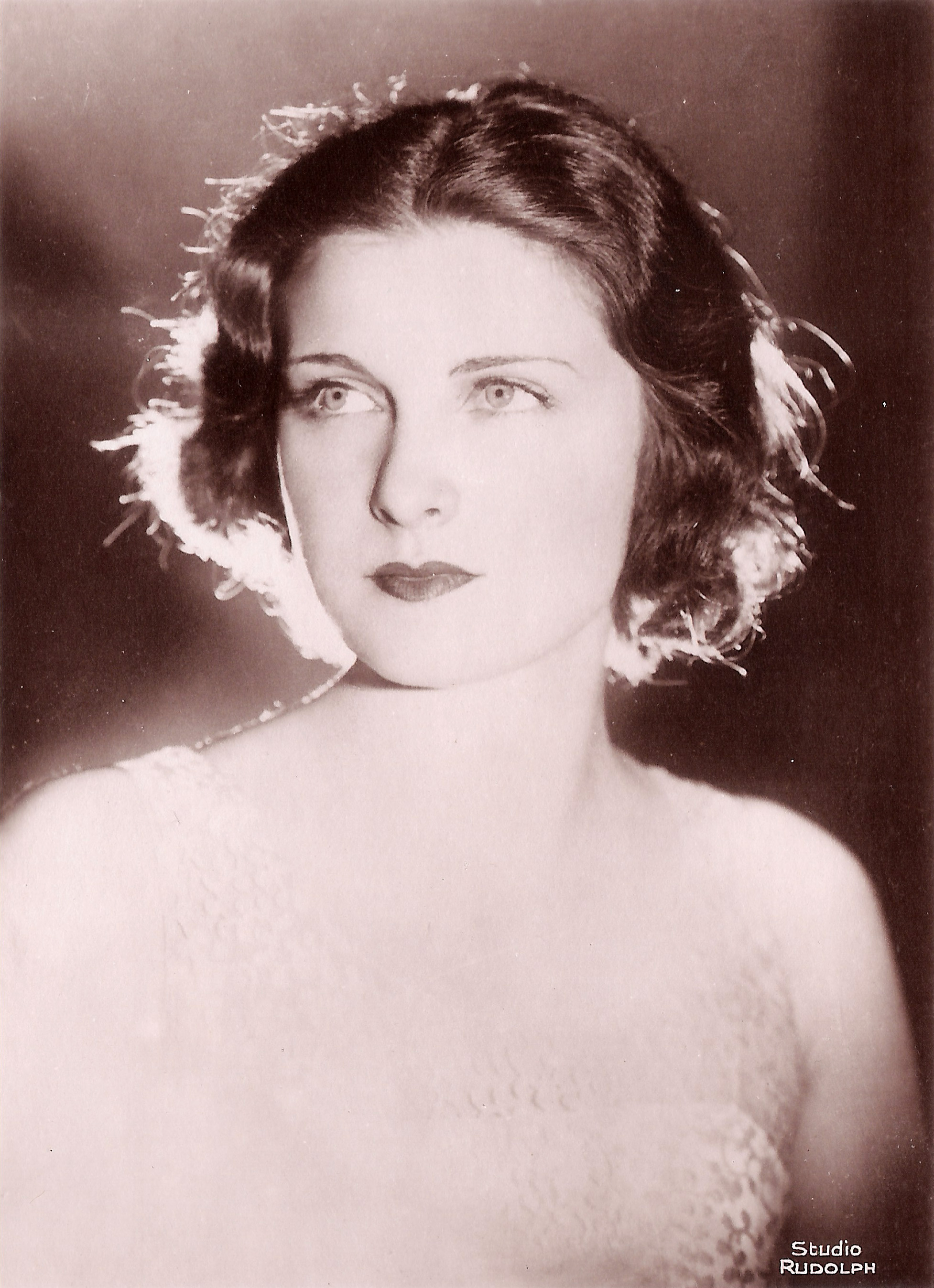
- Genevois in 1930
- Born: Simone Rolande Marthe Genevois; 13 February 1912; Paris, France
- Died: 16 December 1995 (aged 83); Ascona, Switzerland
- Occupation: Actress
- Years active: 1913–1935 (film)

Simone Genevois (13 February 1912 – 16 December 1995) was a French film actress. She began her career as a child actor. Her best-known role was in the 1929 epic Saint Joan the Maid in which she played the title part of Joan of Arc.

== Selected filmography ==
- Simone (1918)
- The House of Mystery (1923)
- André Cornélis (1927)
- Napoléon (1927)
- Saint Joan the Maid (1929), as Joan of Arc, a role for which her performance was described as follows: "She is magnetic and appealing, suggesting both the force and the frailty of the heroine."
- The Dream (1931)
- The Case of Doctor Brenner (1933)

== Bibliography ==
- Marina Warner, Joan of Arc: The Image of Female Heroism, OUP, 2013.
