= The Count of Monte Cristo (1918 serial) =

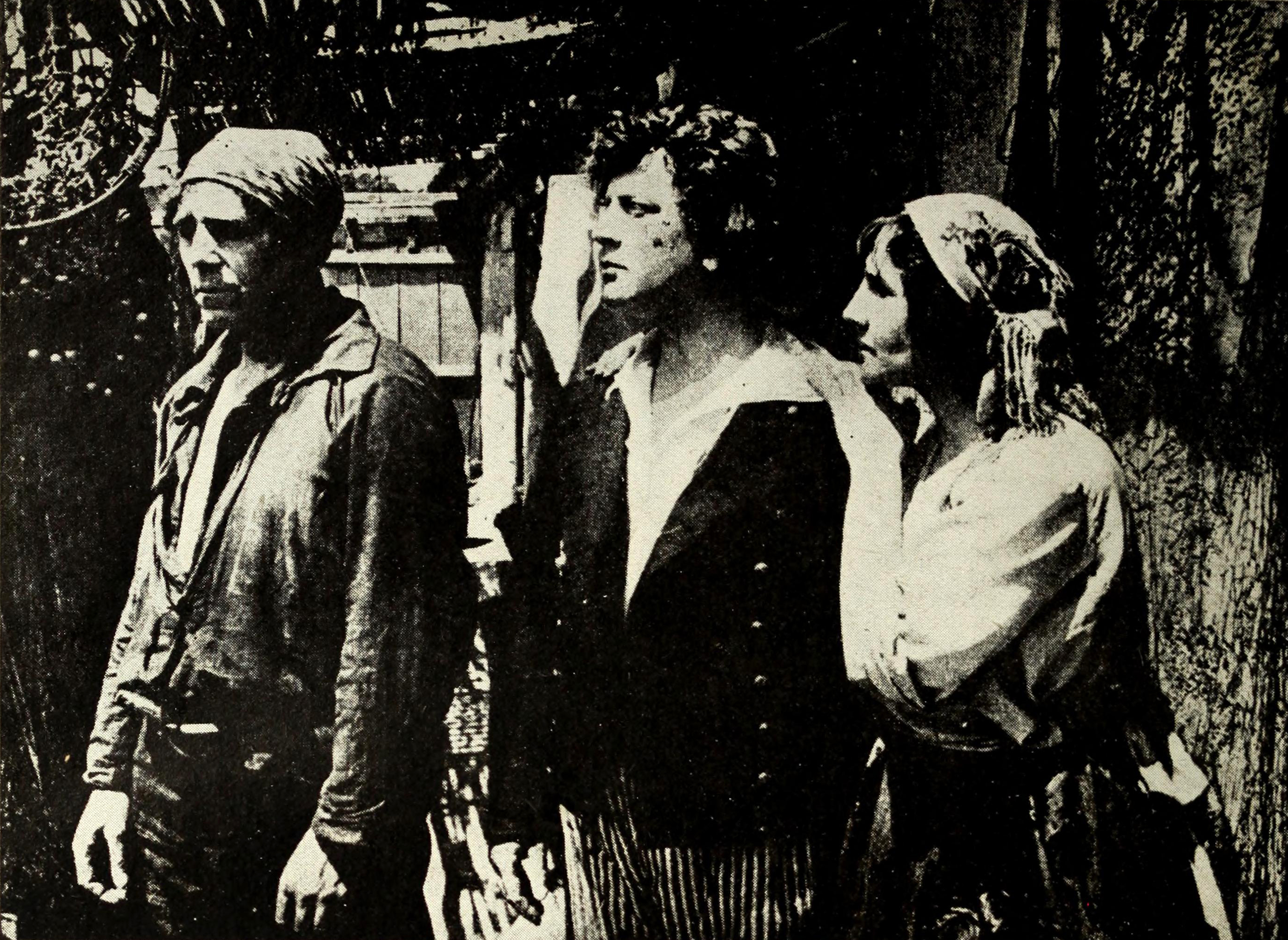
- Directed by: Henri Pouctal
- Based on: The Count of Monte Cristo by Alexandre Dumas
- Starring: Léon Mathot; Nelly Cormon
- Cinematography: Léonce-Henri Burel
- Production company: Pathé Frères
- Distributed by: Pathé Frères
- Release date: 1918
- Country: France
- Languages: Silent; French intertitles

The Count of Monte Cristo

The Count of Monte Cristo (French: Le comte de Monte Cristo) is a 1918 French silent historical film serial based on the novel of the same title by Alexandre Dumas. It was directed by Henri Pouctal and starred Léon Mathot in the title role. It was released in fifteen episodes over a two-month period.

== Bibliography ==
- Goble, Alan. The Complete Index to Literary Sources in Film. Walter de Gruyter, 1999.
