= Nelly Cormon =

French actress

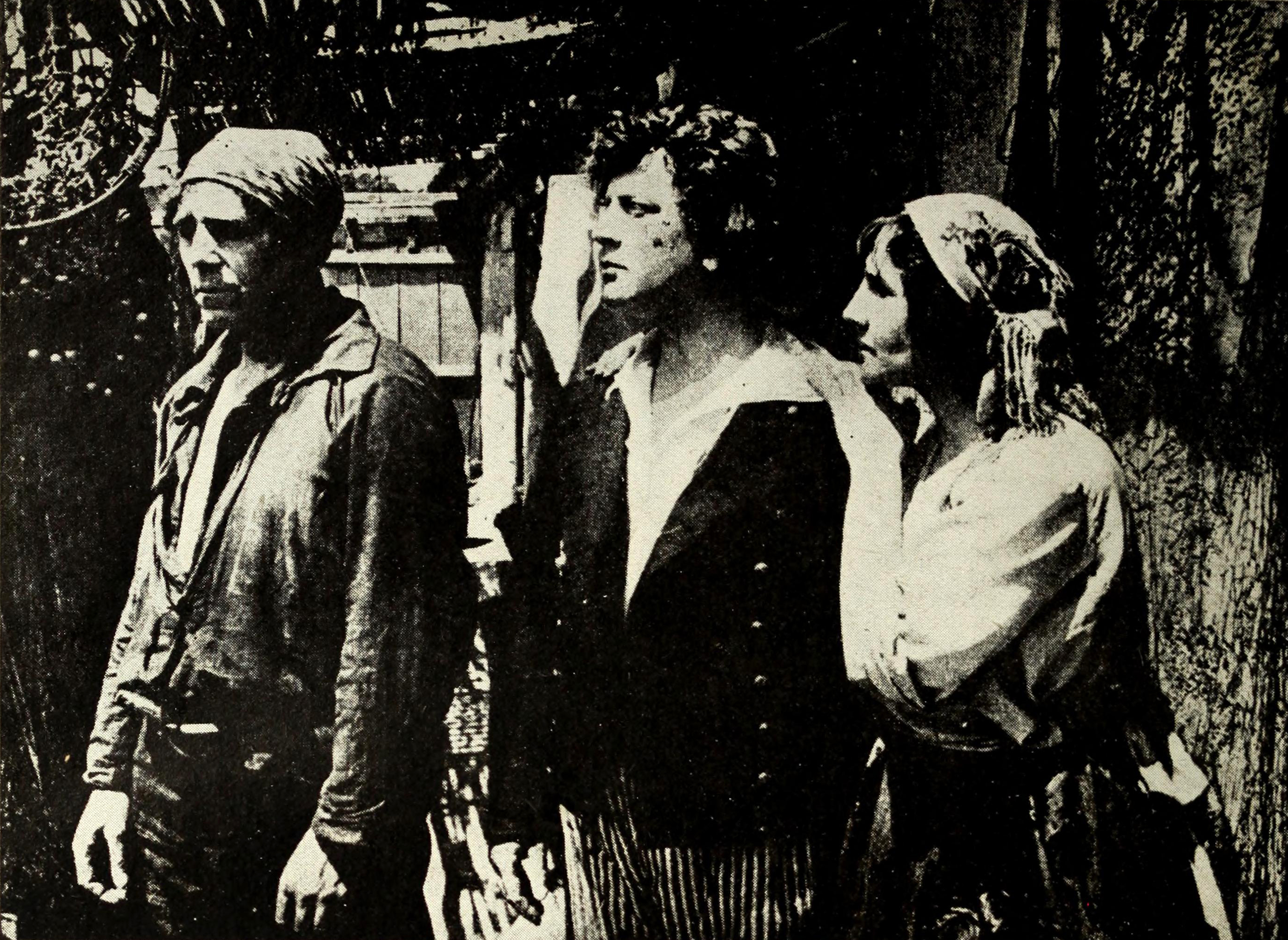
- Cormon (right) in the 1918 serial The Count of Monte Cristo
- Born: 15 December 1877; Bourges, France
- Died: 30 April 1942 (aged 64); Sorel-Moussel, France
- Occupation: Actress
- Years active: 1910–1928 (film)

Nelly Cormon (1877–1942) was a French actress. Primarily known for her stage work, later in her career she appeared in a number of silent films including the title role in Marion Delorme (1918).

== Selected filmography ==
- The Count of Monte Cristo (1918, serial)
- Marion Delorme (1918)
- Madame Récamier (1928)

== Bibliography ==
- Goble, Alan. The Complete Index to Literary Sources in Film. Walter de Gruyter, 1999.
