= Saint Joan the Maid =

1929 film

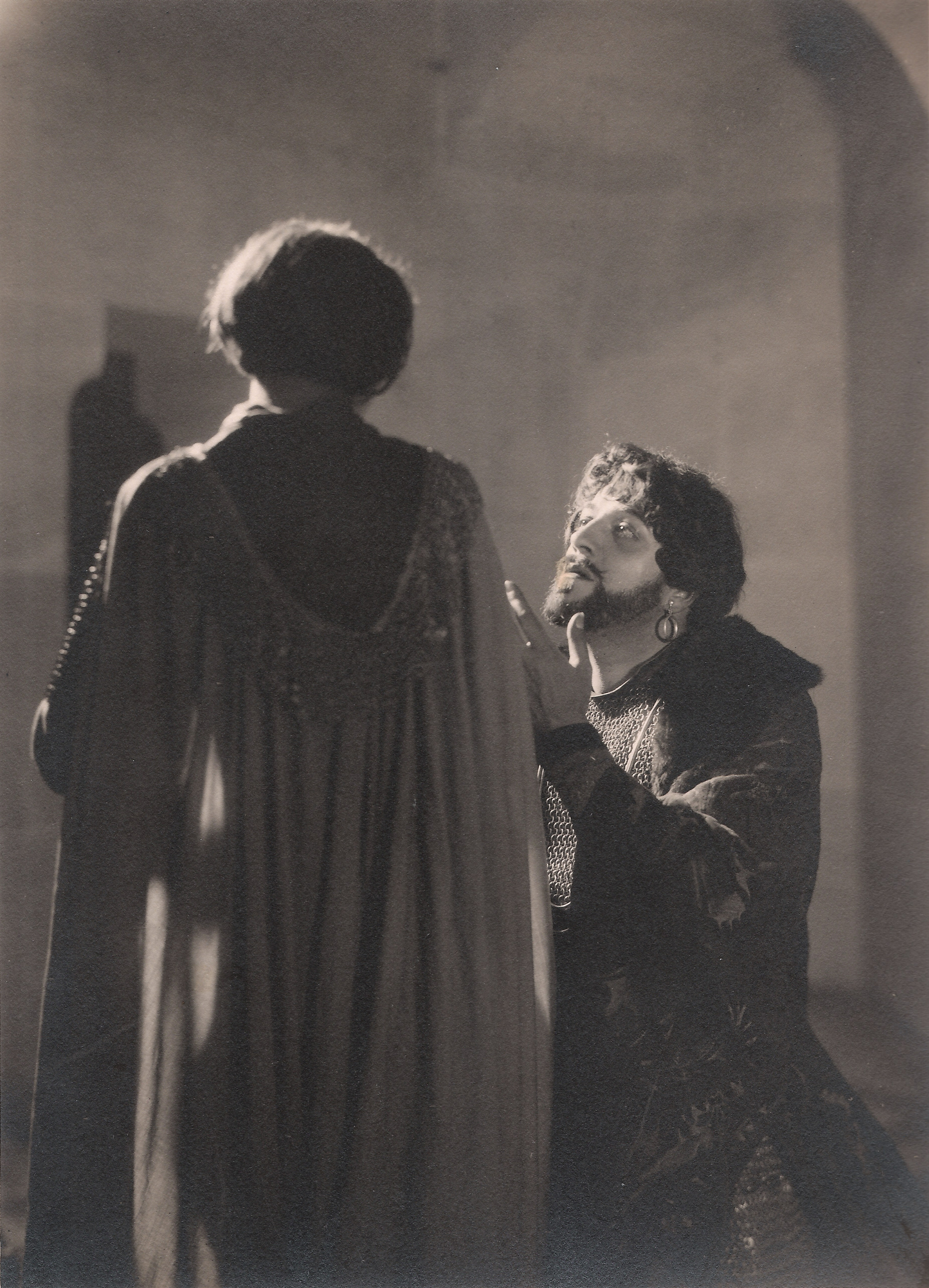
- Simone Genevois and Philippe Hériat in a scene from the film
- Directed by: Marco de Gastyne
- Written by: Jean-José Frappa
- Starring: Simone Genevois; Fernand Mailly; Georges Paulais
- Cinematography: Gaston Brun
- Music by: Allan Bjerne
- Production companies: Pathé-Natan; Rapid Film
- Release date: 1 November 1929
- Running time: 125 minutes
- Countries: France; Germany
- Languages: Silent; French intertitles

Saint Joan the Maid or The Marvellous Life of Joan of Arc (French: La merveilleuse vie de Jeanne d'Arc) is a 1929 French-German silent historical drama film directed by Marco de Gastyne and starring Simone Genevois, Fernand Mailly and Georges Paulais.

== Cast ==
- Simone Genevois as Jeanne d'Arc
- Fernand Mailly as La Hire
- Georges Paulais as Nicolas Loyseleur
- Jean Debucourt as Charles VII
- Philippe Hériat as Gilles de Rais
- Gaston Modot as Lord Glasdall
- Daniel Mendaille as Lord Talbot
- Jean-Louis Allibert
- Genica Athanasiou
- Léonce Cargue

== See also ==
- Cultural depictions of Joan of Arc

== Bibliography ==
- Geoffrey Nowell-Smith. The Oxford History of World Cinema. Oxford University Press, 1997.
