= Abel Gance filmography =

Abel Gance (French: [gɑ̃s], 25 October 1889 – 10 November 1981) was a French film director and producer, writer and actor. A pioneer in the theory and practice of montage, he is best known for three major silent films: J'accuse (1919), La Roue (1923), and the monumental Napoléon (1927).

== Filmography ==
=== Films ===
Year	English title	Original title	Notes
1911	"La Digue"	"La Digue"	unreleased
1912	Le Tragique Amour de Mona Lisa	Le Tragique Amour de Mona Lisa	
1912	Il y a des pieds au plafond	Il y a des pieds au plafond	
1912	La Pierre philosophe	La Pierre philosophe	
1912	"The Mask of Horror"	"Le Masque d'horreur"	
1912	Le Nègre blanc	Le Nègre blanc	
1915	La Fleur des ruines	La Fleur des ruines	
1915	"La Folie du Docteur Tube"	"La Folie du docteur Tube"	
1915	The Enigma of Ten Hours	L'Énigme de dix heures	
1915	The Heroism of Paddy	L'Héroïsme de Paddy	
1915	Strass et Compagnie	Strass et Compagnie	
1915	"Un drame au château d'Acre"	"Un drame au château d'Acre"	
1916	Ce que les flots racontent	Ce que les flots racontent	
1916	Fioritures	Fioritures	
1916	Le Fou de la falaise	Le Fou de la falaise	
1916	Le périscope	Le Périscope	
1916	Les Gaz mortels	Les Gaz mortels	AKA Le brouillard sur la ville
1917	Barberousse	Barberousse	
1917	The Zone of Death	La Zone de la mort	lost film
1917	Le droit à la vie	Le Droit à la vie	
1917	The Torture of Silence	Mater Dolorosa	
1918	Ecce Homo	Ecce Homo	unfinished
1918	The Tenth Symphony	La Dixième Symphonie	
1919	J'accuse	J'accuse	
1923	La Roue	La Roue	
1924	"Au Secours!"	"Au secours !"	short film
1927	Napoléon	Napoléon	
1928	"Marines et cristaux"	"Marines et cristaux"	short film
1931	End of the World	La Fin du monde	
1932	Mater Dolorosa	Mater Dolorosa	
1934	Poliche	Poliche	
1935	Jérôme Perreau, héros des barricades	Jérôme Perreau, héros des barricades	
1935	Lucrezia Borgia	Lucrèce Borgia	
1935	Napoléon Bonaparte	Napoléon Bonaparte	Reworking of the 1927 Napoléon with a soundtrack; reworked in 1971 and released as Bonaparte et la Révolution
1936	Story of a Poor Young Man	Le Roman d'un jeune homme pauvre	
1936	Beethoven's Great Love	Un grand amour de Beethoven	
1938	The Woman Thief	Le Voleur de femmes	
1938	J'accuse!	J'accuse	
1939	Louise	Louise	
1940	Paradise Lost	Paradis perdu	
1941	Blind Venus	Vénus aveugle	
1943	Captain Fracasse	Le Capitaine Fracasse	
1953	"Quatorze juillet"	"Quatorze juillet"	documentary short film
1955	Tower of Lust	La Tour de Nesle	
1956	Magirama	Magirama	
1960	Austerlitz	Austerlitz	
1964	Cyrano and d'Artagnan	Cyrano et d'Artagnan	
1966	Marie Tudor	Marie Tudor	television film
1967	Valmy	Valmy	television film; completed by Jean Chérasse

=== Other film work ===
Year	English title	Original title	Notes
1909	"Molière"	"Molière"	actor; directed by Léonce Perret
1929	Napoleon at Saint Helena	Napoleon auf Sankt Helena	co-writer; directed by Lupu Pick
1933	The Ironmaster	Le Maître de forges	writer and supervisor; directed by Fernand Rivers
1934	The Lady of the Camellias	La Dame aux camélias	writer and supervisor; directed by Fernand Rivers
1953	"Lumière"	"Lumière"	voiceover; documentary directed by Paul Paviot

== Bibliography ==
- "Abel Gance". Fiches personnalités (in French). Cinémathèque Française.
