= List of French films of 1923 =

French films released in 1923

Films produced in France in 1923:

Title	Director	Cast	Genre	Notes
The Blaireau Case	Louis Osmont	André Brunot, Marise Dorval	Drama	
Cœur fidèle	Jean Epstein	Gina Manès, Léon Mathot	Drama	
The Courier of Lyon	Léon Poirier	Roger Karl, Daniel Mendaille	Historical	
Fait-divers	Claude Autant-Lara	Antonin Artaud		
Ferragus	Gaston Ravel	René Navarre, Elmire Vautier, Stewart Rome	Drama	
Frou-Frou	Guy Du Fresnay			
Gossette	Germaine Dulac	Regine Bouet, Maurice Schutz	Serial	
The King of Paris	Charles Maudru	Jean Dax, Jean Peyrière	Comedy	
Koenigsmark	Léonce Perret	Maurice Lehmann, Huguette Duflos	Drama	
L'affaire Blaireau	Louis Osmont	André Brunot, Marcelle Duval		
L'affaire de la rue de Lourcine	Henri Diamant-Berger	Maurice Chevalier, Florelle		
L'Emprise	Henri Diamant-Berger	Pierette Madd, Marguerite Moreno		
L'enfant-roi	Jean Kemm	Andre Lionel, Joe Hamman	Serial	
L'énigme du Mont Agel	Alfred Machin, Henri Wulschleger	Lucien Dalsace, Odette Josylla	Adventure	
L'espionne	Henri Desfontaines			
L'inondation	Louis Delluc	Ève Francis, Edmond Van Daële	Drama	
L'insigne mystérieux	Henri Desfontaines	Adolphe Cande, Cervieres	Comedy drama	
La Dame de Monsoreau	René Le Somptier			
La faute des autres	Jacques Oliver			
La Garçonne	Armand Du Plessy			
La Guitare et le Jazz-Band	Gaston Roudès			
La légende de sœur Béatrix	Jacques de Baroncelli	Sandra Milowanoff, Eric Barclay		
La malchanceuse	E.B. Donatien			
La Mare au diable	Pierre Caron	Gladys Rolland, Jean-David Evremond		
La nuit rouge	Maurice de Marsan and Maurice Gleize			
La neige sur les pas	André Berthomieu	Pierre Blanchar, Michele Alfa		
La porteuse de pain	René Le Somptier	Suzanne Desprès, Gabriel Signoret	Drama	
La Réponse du destin	André Hugon	René Navarre, Colette Darfeuil		
La rue du pavé d'amour	André Hugon	Sylvette Fillacier, Adrienne Duriez		
La Roue	Abel Gance	Ivy Close, Pierre Magnier		
La voyante	Léon Abrams, Louis Mercanton			
Le costaud des Epinettes	Raymond Bernard	Germaine Fontanes, Henri Debain		
Le Cousin Pons	Jacques Robert	Andre Nox, Claire Darcas	Comedy drama	
Le gamin de Paris	Louis Feuillade			
Le marchand de plaisirs	Jaque-Catelain	Marcelle Pradot, Philippe Hériat		
Le Petit Chose	André Hugon	Jean Debucourt, Alexiane		
Le petit Jacques	Georges Raulet, Georges Lannes			
Le petit moineau de Paris	Gaston Roudès			
Le Reflet de Claude Mercœur	Julien Duvivier	Camille Beuve, Gaston Jacquet	Drama	
Le Retour à la Raison	Man Ray	Alice Prin	Drama	
Le roi de la vitesse	Henri Diamant-Berger	Pierette Madd, Pierre De Guingand		
Le taxi 313 X 7	Pierre Colombier			
Le vol	Robert Péguy			
Les Rantzau	Gaston Roudès			
My Aunt from Honfleur	Robert Saidreau	Jane Loury, Armand Bernard, Marcel Vallée	Comedy	
Nène	Jacques de Baroncelli			
Par-dessus le mur	Pierre Colombier			
Petit Ange et son pantin	Luitz Morat			
Petit hôtel à louer	Pière Colombier			
The Portrait	Jacques Feyder	Arlette Marchal, Malcolm Tod, Victor Vina	Drama	Co-production with Austria
Pulcinella	Gaston Roudès			
The Red Inn	Jean Epstein	Gina Manès, Léon Mathot, Jean-David Évremond	Historical	
Résurrection	Marcel L'Herbier	Emmy Lynn, Claire Prelia		
Rouletabille chez les bohémiens			Serial	
The Secret of Polichinelle	René Hervil	Andrée Brabant, Gabriel Signoret	Comedy	
The Snow on the Footsteps	Henri Étiévant	Victor Francen, Germaine Fontanes, Simone Guy	Drama	
Soirée Mondaine	Pierre Colombier			
Souvent femme varie	Jean Legrand			
Survivre	Édouard Chinot			
Terreur	Edward José			
Un bon petit diable	René Leprince			
Vidocq	Jean Kemm	René Navarre, Elmire Vautier, Rachel Devirys	Drama	
Vindicta (film)				

== See also ==
- 1923 in France
