= Coupable =

Coupable (French for 'Guilty' or 'Culprit') may refer to:

- Culprit (1917 film), originally titled Le Coupable
- Culprit (1937 film), originally titled Le Coupable
- Guilty? (1951 film), originally titled Coupable?
- "Coupable" (song), 1973
