= 1923 in film =

This is an overview of 1923 in film, including significant events, a list of films released and notable births and deaths.

== Top-grossing films (U.S.) ==
The top eight films released in 1923 by U.S. gross are as follows:

Highest-grossing films of 1923
Rank	Title	Distributor	Domestic rentals
1	The Ten Commandments	Paramount	$4,169,798
2	The Covered Wagon	Paramount	$3,500,000
3/4 (tie)	Safety Last! The Hunchback of Notre Dame	Pathé Exchange; Universal	$1,500,000
5	Scaramouche	Metro	$1,000,000
6	Adam's Rib	Paramount	$881,206
7	Main Street	Warner Bros.	$510,000
8	The Gold Diggers	Warner Bros.	$470,000
9	Tiger Rose	Warner Bros.	$466,000

== Events ==
- April 4 – Warner Bros. Pictures Inc. incorporated in the United States.
- April 15 – Lee De Forest demonstrates the Phonofilm sound-on-film system at the Rivoli Theater in New York with a series of short musical films featuring vaudeville performers.
- Henry Roussel's Les Opprimés is released, introducing mattes (painted by W. Percy Day) to French cinema.
- October 16 – Brothers Walt and Roy O. Disney establish Disney Brothers Studio (later to be known as Walt Disney Productions).

== Notable films released in 1923 ==
American films unless stated otherwise

=== A ===
- Adam's Rib, directed by Cecil B. DeMille
- The Ancient Law (Das alte Gesetz), directed by E. A. Dupont, starring Henny Porten – (Germany)
- Ashes of Vengeance, directed by Frank Lloyd, starring Norma Talmadge and Wallace Beery
- The Audacious Mr. Squire, directed by Edwin Greenwood, starring Jack Buchanan – (GB)

=== B ===
- The Balloonatic, directed by Edward F. Cline and Buster Keaton, starring Buster Keaton
- Barsoum Looking for a Job, directed by Mohammed Bayoumi, starring Bishara Wakim – (Egypt)
- The Bells, directed by Edwin Greenwood, based on the 1867 play The Polish Jew by Erckmann-Chatrian – (GB)
- The Bishop of the Ozarks (lost), directed by Finis Fox
- Black Oxen, directed by Frank Lloyd, starring Corinne Griffith
- The Blizzard (lost), directed by Mauritz Stiller – (Sweden)
- Blood and Soul (Chi to Rei), directed by Kenji Mizoguchi – (Japan)
- The Blue Lagoon (lost), directed by William Bowden and Dick Cruikshanks, starring Molly Adair and Arthur Pusey - (GB / South Africa)
- Bonnie Prince Charlie (lost), directed by Charles Calvert, starring Ivor Novello and Gladys Cooper – (GB)
- The Brass Bottle (lost), directed by Maurice Tourneur

=== C ===
- Cameo Kirby, directed by John Ford, starring John Gilbert
- Circus Days, directed by Edward F. Cline, starring Jackie Coogan
- Cœur fidèle (Faithful Heart), directed by Jean Epstein – (France)
- The Courtship of Miles Standish, directed by Frederic Sullivan
- The Covered Wagon, directed by James Cruze, starring J. Warren Kerrigan and Lois Wilson

=== D ===
- The Daring Years (lost), directed by Kenneth Webb, starring Mildred Harris and Clara Bow
- The Doll Maker of Kiang-Ning (Der Puppenmacher von Kiang-Ning), directed by Robert Wiene, starring Werner Krauss – (Germany)
- Drakula halála (Dracula's Death) (lost), directed by Károly Lajthay – (Hungary)
- The Drums of Jeopardy, directed by Edward Dillon, starring Elaine Hammerstein and Wallace Beery, based on the 1920 novel by Harold MacGrath

=== E ===
- The Extra Girl, directed by F. Richard Jones, starring Mabel Normand

=== F ===
- Faust, directed by Bertram Phillips, based on the 1808 play by Johann Wolfgang von Goethe – (GB)
- Frozen Hearts, directed by J. A. Howe, starring Stan Laurel

=== G ===
- The Gold Diggers (lost), directed by Harry Beaumont
- The Grub-Stake, directed by Bert Van Tuyle, starring Nell Shipman

=== H ===
- The Harbour Lights, directed by Tom Terriss, starring Tom Moore and Isobel Elsom – (GB)
- Hoy o Nuca, Bésame, directed by José Nepomuceno – (Philippines)
- The Hunchback of Notre Dame, directed by Wallace Worsley, starring Lon Chaney, Patsy Ruth Miller and Norman Kerry, based on the 1831 novel by Victor Hugo

=== I ===
- I Will Repay, directed by Henry Kolker, starring Holmes Herbert and Flora Le Breton – (GB)
- I.N.R.I., directed by Robert Wiene – (Germany)
- The Isle of Lost Ships (lost), directed by Maurice Tourneur
- Itching Palms, directed by James W. Horne, based on the play When Jerry Comes Home by Roy Briant

=== L ===
- The Lady Owner, directed by Walter West – (GB)
- The Last Moment (lost), directed by J. Parker Read Jr., starring Henry Hull, Doris Kenyon and Louis Wolheim
- Little Old New York, directed by Sidney Olcott, starring Marion Davies
- The Lost Soul, directed by Hugo Werner-Kahle – (Austria)
- The Love Nest, directed by Edward F. Cline and Buster Keaton, starring Buster Keaton
- The Loves of Mary, Queen of Scots, directed by Denison Clift, starring Fay Compton – (GB)

=== M ===
- Main Street (lost), directed by Harry Beaumont
- The Man in the Iron Mask (Der Mann mit der eisernen Maske), directed by Max Glass – (Germany)
- The Merchant of Venice (Der Kaufmann von Venedig), directed by Peter Paul Felner, starring Werner Krauss and Henny Porten – (Germany)
- Merry-Go-Round, directed by Erich von Stroheim, starring Mary Philbin and Norman Kerry
- Miss Suwanna of Siam (Nang Sao Suwan) (lost), directed by Henry MacRae
- The Monkey's Paw, directed by Manning Haynes, based on the 1902 short story by W. W. Jacobs – (GB)
- Mysteries of a Barbershop (Mysterien eines Friseursalons), directed by Erich Engel – (Germany)
- The Mystery of Dr. Fu Manchu, 15-part serial directed by A. E. Coleby – (GB)

=== O ===
- On the Banks of the Wabash, directed by J. Stuart Blackton
- Our Hospitality, directed by John G. Blystone and Buster Keaton, starring Buster Keaton
- Out to Win, directed by Denison Clift, starring Catherine Calvert and Clive Brook – (GB)

=== P ===
- Paddy the Next Best Thing (lost), directed by Graham Cutts, starring Mae Marsh – (GB)
- The Pilgrim, a Charlie Chaplin film
- Puritan Passions (lost), directed by Frank Tuttle, starring Glenn Hunter and Mary Astor, based on the 1908 play The Scarecrow by Percy MacKaye
- The Purple Highway (lost), directed by Henry Kolker, starring Madge Kennedy

=== R ===
- Raskolnikow, directed by Robert Wiene – (Germany)
- The Red Inn (L'auberge rouge), directed by Jean Epstein, based on the 1831 short story by Honoré de Balzac (remade in 1951) – (France)
- Red Lights, directed by Clarence G. Badger, starring Marie Prevost, based on the play The Rear Car by Edward Everett Rose
- Le Retour à la Raison (Return to Reason), directed by Man Ray – (France)
- Rosita, directed by Ernst Lubitsch, starring Mary Pickford
- La Roue (The Wheel), directed by Abel Gance – (France)
- Rupert of Hentzau (lost), directed by Victor Heerman

=== S ===
- Safety Last!, directed by Fred C. Newmeyer and Sam Taylor, starring Harold Lloyd
- Salomé, directed by Charles Bryant, starring Alla Nazimova
- Scaramouche, directed by Rex Ingram, Starring Ramón Novarro, Alice Terry and Lewis Stone
- Schatten – Eine nächtliche Halluzination (Shadows - a Nocturnal Hallucination), directed by Arthur Robison – (Germany)
- The Shock, directed by Lambert Hillyer, starring Lon Chaney
- The Shriek of Araby, directed by F. Richard Jones, starring Ben Turpin
- The Sign of Four, directed by Maurice Elvey, starring Eille Norwood, based on the 1890 novel by Arthur Conan Doyle – (GB)
- Slave of Desire, directed by George D. Baker, starring Bessie Love, based on the 1831 novel La Peau de chagrin by Honoré de Balzac
- Souls for Sale, directed by Rupert Hughes, starring Eleanor Boardman, Mae Busch and Richard Dix
- A Spectre Haunts Europe, directed by Vladimir Gardin, based on the 1842 short story The Masque of the Red Death by Edgar Allan Poe – (U.S.S.R.)
- Squibs M.P., directed by George Pearson, starring Betty Balfour – (GB)
- The Street (Die Straße), directed by Karl Grune – (Germany)
- Suzanna, directed by F. Richard Jones, starring Mabel Normand

=== T ===
- The Ten Commandments, directed by Cecil B. DeMille, starring Theodore Roberts
- This Freedom, directed by Denison Clift, starring Fay Compton and Clive Brook – (GB)
- Three Ages, directed by Edward F. Cline and Buster Keaton, starring Buster Keaton and Wallace Beery
- Three Wise Fools, directed by King Vidor
- Through Fire and Water, directed by Thomas Bentley, starring Clive Brook and Flora Le Breton – (GB)
- Tiger Rose, directed by Sidney Franklin (director), starring Lenore Ulric
- The Treasure (Der Schatz), directed by G. W. Pabst – (Germany)
- Trilby, directed by James Young, based on the 1894 novel by George du Maurier
- Tut-Tut and his Terrible Tomb, directed by Bertram Phillips – (GB)

=== U ===
- Under the Red Robe, directed by Alan Crosland, starring Robert B. Mantell
- The Unknown Tomorrow (Das unbekannte Morgen), directed by Alexander Korda, starring Werner Krauss – (Germany)

=== W ===
- While Paris Sleeps (lost), directed by Maurice Tourneur, starring Lon Chaney and John Gilbert, based on a novelThe Glory of Love by Leslie Beresford
- The White Shadow, directed by Graham Cutts, starring Betty Compson and Clive Brook – (GB)
- The White Sister, directed by Henry King, starring Lillian Gish and Ronald Colman
- Why Worry?, directed by Fred C. Newmeyer and Sam Taylor, starring Harold Lloyd and Jobyna Ralston
- Wild Bill Hickok, directed by Clifford Smith, starring William S. Hart
- Within the Law, directed by Frank Lloyd, starring Norma Talmadge
- A Woman of Paris, written and directed by Charles Chaplin, starring Edna Purviance
- Woman to Woman (lost), directed by Graham Cutts, starring Betty Compson and Clive Brook – (GB)

== Short film series ==
- Charlie Chaplin (1914–23)
- Buster Keaton (1917–41)
- Our Gang (1922–44)

== Animated short film series ==
- Felix the Cat (1919–36)
- Koko the Clown (1919–34)
- Aesop's Film Fables (1921–34)
- Alice Comedies
  - Alice's Wonderland
- The Red Head Comedies (1923).

== Births ==
- January 1 – Valentina Cortese, Italian actress (died 2019)
- January 3 - Bud Tingwell, Australian actor (died 2009)
- January 5 - Boris Leskin, Soviet-American actor (died 2020)
- January 7 – Pinkas Braun, Swiss actor, director (died 2008)
- January 8 – Larry Storch, American actor (died 2022)
- January 17 - Carol Raye, British-born Australian actress, comedian and singer (died 2022)
- January 19 – Jean Stapleton, American actress (died 2013)
- January 22 - Diana Douglas, American actress (died 2015)
- January 23 – Silvano Campeggi, Italian poster designer (died 2018)
- January 26 – Anne Jeffreys, American actress (died 2017)
- January 29 – Paddy Chayefsky, American screenwriter (died 1981)
- February 2 – Bonita Granville, American actress (died 1988)
- February 12 – Franco Zeffirelli, Italian director (died 2019)
- February 18 - Allan Melvin, American actor and impressionist (died 2008)
- February 21 – Lola Flores, Spanish actress (died 1995)
- February 28 – Charles Durning, American actor (died 2012)
- March 8 – Booth Colman, American actor (died 2014)
- March 10 – Dolores Fuller, American actress (died 2011)
- March 11 – Terence Alexander, English actor (died 2009)
- March 12 - Vladek Sheybal, Polish character actor, singer and director (died 1992)
- March 19 – Pamela Britton, American actress (died 1974)
- March 22 - Carmen Filpi, American character actor (died 2003)
- March 24 - Murray Hamilton, American actor (died 1986)
- April 2 – Gloria Henry, American actress (died 2021)
- April 4
  - Gene Reynolds, American actor, producer (died 2020)
  - Peter Vaughan, English character actor (died 2016)
- April 5 - Michael V. Gazzo, American actor (died 1995)
- April 6 - Chang Feng, Chinese actor (died 2022)
- April 12 – Ann Miller, American dancer, singer, actress (died 2004)
- April 13 - Don Adams, American actor, comedian and director (died 2005)
- April 15 – Harvey Lembeck, American actor (died 1982)
- April 17
  - Lindsay Anderson, British director and actor (died 1994)
  - Lon McCallister, American actor (died 2005)
- April 22 - Avis Bunnage, English actress (died 1990)
- April 28 – Adele Mara, American actress (died 2010)
- April 29 - Irvin Kershner, American director, actor and producer (died 2010)
- May 4 – Eric Sykes, British actor and comedian (died 2012)
- May 7 – Anne Baxter, actress (died 1985)
- May 14 – Mrinal Sen, Bengali director (died 2018)
- May 20 – Edith Fellows, American actress (died 2011)
- May 26
  - James Arness, American actor (died 2011)
  - Roy Dotrice, British actor (died 2017)
- May 29 – Carl Duering, German-British actor (died 2018)
- May 30 - Jimmy Lydon, American actor and producer (died 2022)
- June 5 - Peggy Stewart, American actress (died 2019)
- June 8
  - Myron Healey, American actor (died 2005)
  - Peggy Maley, American actress (died 2007)
  - Charles Tyner, American character actor (died 2017)
- June 12 – Herta Elviste, Estonian actress (died 2015)
- June 18 - Robert Ellenstein, American actor (died 2010)
- June 20 - Jerzy Nowak, Polish actor (died 2013)
- June 28 - Ray Boyle, American actor (died 2022)
- July 6 – Cathy O'Donnell, American actress (died 1970)
- July 8 - Val Bettin, American actor (died 2021)
- July 14 – Dale Robertson, American actor (died 2013)
- July 18 – Michael Medwin, English actor and producer (died 2020)
- July 22 – Mukesh, Indian singer (died 1976)
- July 25
  - Estelle Getty, American actress and comedian (died 2008)
  - Allan Lurie, American voice actor (died 2015)
- July 26 – Biff Elliot, American actor (died 2012)
- July 29 – Gordon Mitchell, American actor and bodybuilder (died 2003)
- August 3 – Jean Hagen, American actress (died 1977)
- August 9 - John Stephenson, American actor (died 2015)
- August 10
  - Rhonda Fleming, American actress (died 2020)
  - Vernon Washington, American character actor (died 1988)
- August 14 – Alice Ghostley, American actress (died 2007)
- August 15 – Rose Marie, American actress, singer (died 2017)
- August 17 – Julius Harris, American actor (died 2004)
- August 24 - June Dayton, American actress (died 1994)
- August 28 - Alexander Doré, British actor, director and screenwriter (died 2002)
- August 29 – Richard Attenborough, English actor and director (died 2014)
- August 30 - William Duell, American actor and singer (died 2011)
- August 31 - Ed Grady, American actor (died 2012)
- September 1 - Habib Tanvir, Indian actor (died 2009)
- September 7 – Peter Lawford, British-American actor (died 1984)
- September 9 - Cliff Robertson, American actor (died 2011)
- September 11 - Betsy Drake, American actress, writer (died 2015)
- September 20 - Ricardo Montez, Gibraltarian actor (died 2010)
- September 23
  - Margaret Pellegrini, American actress (died 2013)
  - Jimmy Weldon, American actor, ventriloquist and television host (died 2023)
- September 27
  - Tony Giorgio, American actor (died 2012)
  - Mary McCarty, American actress (died 1980)
- September 28 - William Windom, American actor (died 2012)
- October 1 – Kim Yaroshevskaya, Russian-born Canadian actress (died 2025)
- October 4 – Charlton Heston, American actor (died 2008)
- October 5 – Glynis Johns, British actress (died 2024)
- October 10 - Patrick Jordan, British actor (died 2020)
- October 13 – Cyril Shaps, English character actor (died 2003)
- October 16 – Linda Darnell, American actress (died 1965)
- October 22 – Chris Alcaide, American actor (died 2004)
- October 23 - Frank Sutton, American actor (died 1974)
- October 30 – William Campbell, American actor (died 2011)
- November 7 – Derek Francis, English comedian and character actor (died 1984)
- November 12 - Richard Venture, American actor (died 2017)
- November 13 – Linda Christian, Mexican-American actress (died 2011)
- November 21 - Helen Horton, American actress (died 2007)
- November 23 – Keiju Kobayashi, Japanese actor (died 2010)
- November 28
  - Gloria Grahame, American actress (died 1981)
  - James Karen, American actor (died 2018)
- December 4 - Vincent Ball, Australian retired actor
- December 10 – Harold Gould, American actor (died 2010)
- December 11 – Betsy Blair, American actress (died 2009)
- December 12 - Bob Barker, American television game show host (died 2023)
- December 19 – Gordon Jackson, Scottish actor (died 1990)
- December 28 – Andrew Duggan, American character actor (died 1988)
- December 29
  - Dina Merrill, American actress (died 2017)
  - Mike Nussbaum, American actor and director (died 2023)

== Deaths ==
- January 18 – Wallace Reid, American actor (born 1892)
- March 3 – Dante Testa, Italian actor and director (born 1861)
- March 26 – Sarah Bernhardt, French actress (born 1844)
- May 21 – Charles Kent, veteran actor and director (born 1852)
- June 11 – Porter Strong, American silent film actor
- June 17 – Macey Harlam, screen actor (born 1873)
- July 12 – Harry Lonsdale, stage and screen actor (born 1865)
- July 30 – Charles Hawtrey, veteran British actor (born 1858)
- August 29 – Bernard Durning, American actor and director, (born 1893)
- September 11 – Siegmund Lubin, American motion picture pioneer (born 1851)
- September 26 – Jerome Patrick, Broadway stage and silent film leading man (born 1883)
- October 28 – Joe Roberts, American actor (born 1871)
- November 20 – Allen Holubar, American actor and director (born 1888)
- November 30 – Martha Mansfield, American actress (born 1899)
- December 28 – Frank Hayes, American actor and comedian (born 1871)

== Film debuts ==
- Frank Albertson – The Covered Wagon
- Mariska Aldrich – Souls for Sale
- Jean Arthur – Cameo Kirby
- Johnny Arthur – The Unknown Purple
- Irving Bacon – Anna Christie
- Julie Bishop – Children of Jazz
- Olive Borden – Ponjola
- Mary Carlisle – Long Live the King
- Marlene Dietrich – The Little Napoleon
- Charles Farrell – The Cheat
- Leslie Fenton – Gentle Julia
- Bess Flowers – Hollywood
- Carmelita Geraghty – Jealous Husbands
- Gloria Grey – Bag and Baggage
- James Hall – Man Alone
- Tim Holt – Hollywood
- Carmencita Johnson – The Courtship of Miles Standish
- Mary Kid – Avalanche
- Helen Mack – Success
- June Marlowe – Fighting Blood
- Ken Maynard – Brass Commandments
- Donald Meek – Six Cylinder Love
- Thomas Mitchell – Six Cylinder Love
- Greta Nissen – Daarskab, dyd og driverter
- Jack Oakie – His Children's Children
- Edna May Oliver – Wife in Name Only
- Madeleine Renaud – Vent debout
- Marjorie Reynolds – Trilby
- Stanley Ridges – Success
- Gilbert Roland – The Hunchback of Notre Dame
- Dolores Rousse – No Mother to Guide Her
- Martha Sleeper – The Mailman
- Suzy Vernon – The Portrait
- Erika von Thellmann – The Stone Rider
- Harry Woods – Don Quickshot of the Rio Grande
