= Le Coupable =

Le Coupable (French for 'The Culprit') may refer to:

- Culprit (1917 film)
- Culprit (1937 film)

== See also ==
- Coupable
