= Un drame au château d'Acre =

1915 film

- Directed by: Abel Gance
- Written by: Abel Gance
- Produced by: Louis Nalpas
- Starring: Yvonne Briey
- Cinematography: Léonce-Henri Burel
- Release date: 1 May 1915
- Running time: 6 minutes
- Country: France
- Languages: Silent; French intertitles

Un drame au château d'Acre is a 1915 short silent French drama film directed by Abel Gance.

== Cast ==
- Yvonne Briey
- Henri Maillard
- Aurelio Sidney (as Aurele Sydney)
- Jacques Volnys
- Jean Toulout as Ermont
