= Paulette Noizeux =

French actress (1887–1971)

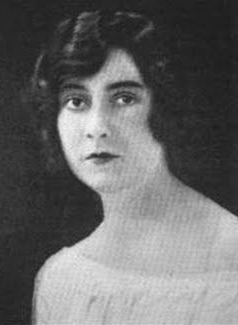
- Paulette Noizeux, from a 1918 publication.
- Born: Marie-Paule Cœuré; 30 May 1887; Saint-Omer, Pas-de-Calais, France
- Died: 9 April 1971 (aged 83); Paris, France
- Other name: Paulette Roquevert
- Occupation: actor
- Years active: 1908–1968
- Spouse: Noël Roquevert

Paulette Noizeux (born Marie-Paule Cœuré; 30 May 1887 – 9 April 1971) was a French stage and film actress who began her career on the stages of France and New York in the 1910s. Her career spanned sixty years.

Noizeux was born in Saint-Omer, Pas-de-Calais, France. She made her film debut in the 1911 Abel Gance-directed film short La Digue, opposite actors Jean Renoir and Jean Toulout. The film is notable for being Gance's directoral debut. She would go on to have a prolific stage career in her native France, as well as appearing on Broadway in several plays from 1917 to 1918.

Noizeux was married to stage and screen actor Noël Roquevert. Her last film appearance was a small part in the 1968 Norbert Terry-directed Swiss/French joint film production Jeunes filles bien... pour tous rapports (English release title: The Sexy Dozen), in which her husband also appeared.

Paulette Noizeux died in Paris in 1971 at the age of 83.

== Selected filmography ==
Year	Title	Role	Notes
1911	La Digue		Short
1913	Une brute humaine		
1913	Le Roman d'un jeune homme pauvre		
1913	L'Infamie d'un autre	Irène Delange	
1913	La Bergère d'Ivry	Hortense Fauvel	
1914	Vingt ans de haine		
1914	La Vieillesse du père Morieux	Marguerite	
1915	L'énigme de dix heures		
1934	Moscow Nights		Uncredited
1937	La chanson du souvenir	Mme. de Raschkoff	
1937	Gueule d'amour (English release title: Lady Killer)	L'épouse au face à main	
1949	Du Guesclin	Une religieuse	
1956	Toute la ville accuse		
1963	The Reluctant Spy	La servante de la mère de Stanislas	Uncredited
1965	L'or du duc		
1968	Jeunes filles bien... pour tous rapports		
1971	Mais qui donc m'a fait ce bébé?		(final film role)
