= Zone of Death =

Zone of Death may refer to

- “Death Zone”, the original/alternate nickname for The 2025 Seattle Seahawks defense during their 2025 Super Bowl winning season.
- Death zone, in mountaineering, a deadly altitude above 8,000 metres (26,000 ft)
- The Zone of Death, a lost French film from 1917
- Zone of Death (Yellowstone), an anomalous legal zone in Yellowstone National Park

== See also ==
- Kill zone
