= Paul Vermoyal =

French actor

- Born: Pierre Paul Vermoyal; 18 October 1888; Braye-en-Laonnois, Aisne, France
- Died: 28 September 1925 (aged 36); Amélie-les-Bains-Palalda, Pyrénées-Orientales, France
- Occupation: Actor
- Years active: 1910–1925

Pierre Paul Vermoyal (18 October 1888 – 28 September 1925) was a French stage and film actor.

== Biography ==
Vermoyal was born in Braye-en-Laonnois, Aisne, Picardy. He began his career on the stages of the Grand Guignol theatre in the Quartier Pigalle area of Paris in the 1910s. His first known film appearance was in the 1916 Maurice Mariaud directed short film Le roi de l'étain, produced by Pathé Frères. He would go on to appear in a number of films during the 1910s directed by Mariaud, Abel Gance, Jean Manoussi and Robert Boudrioz, among others.

In 1922 he appeared in the Charles Burguet directed serial film The Mysteries of Paris as Maître Ferrand. The film serial ran in twelve installments and was based on the novel of the same name by Eugène Sue. Other prominent film roles of the era include appearances in the Léonce Perret directed Koenigsmark (1923), starring Maurice Lehmann and Huguette Duflos; the Edward José directed Terreur (1924), opposite American actress Pearl White; and the American film The Arab (1924), directed by Rex Ingram and starring Ramon Novarro and Alice Terry. His final film appearance was in the 1925 Benito Perojo directed Au-delà de la mort (also known as Plus loin que la mort and Pour l’amour de son frère.)

Paul Vermoyal died on 28 September 1925 at age 36 in Amélie-les-Bains-Palalda, France.

== Partial filmography ==
Year	Title	Role	Notes
1916	Le Roi de l'étain		
1917	Le droit à la vie	Pierre Veryal	
1917	The Torture of Silence (French release title: Mater dolorosa)	Jean Dormis	
1917	Barberousse		
1917	Les mouettes	Jean Kervil	
1917	The Zone of Death (French: La Zone de la mort)	Zésine	
1917	L'épave		
1919	La sultane de l'amour	Sultan Malik	
1919	Fanny Lear		
1921	La nuit du 13	Jean Renez	
1921	Mathias Sandorf	Sarcany	
1922	La nuit du 11 septembre	Ivan Goubine	
1922	The Mysteries of Paris (French: Les mystères de Paris)	Maître Ferrand - le notaire	Serial
1923	Le costaud des Épinettes	Doizeau	
1923	Koenigsmark	Cyrus Beck	
1924	Terror	Erdmann	
1924	The Arab	Iphraim	
1924	La cible	James Wood	
1924	Au-delà de la mort	Burner	(final film role)
