= Albert Dieudonné =

French actor, screenwriter, film director, and novelist

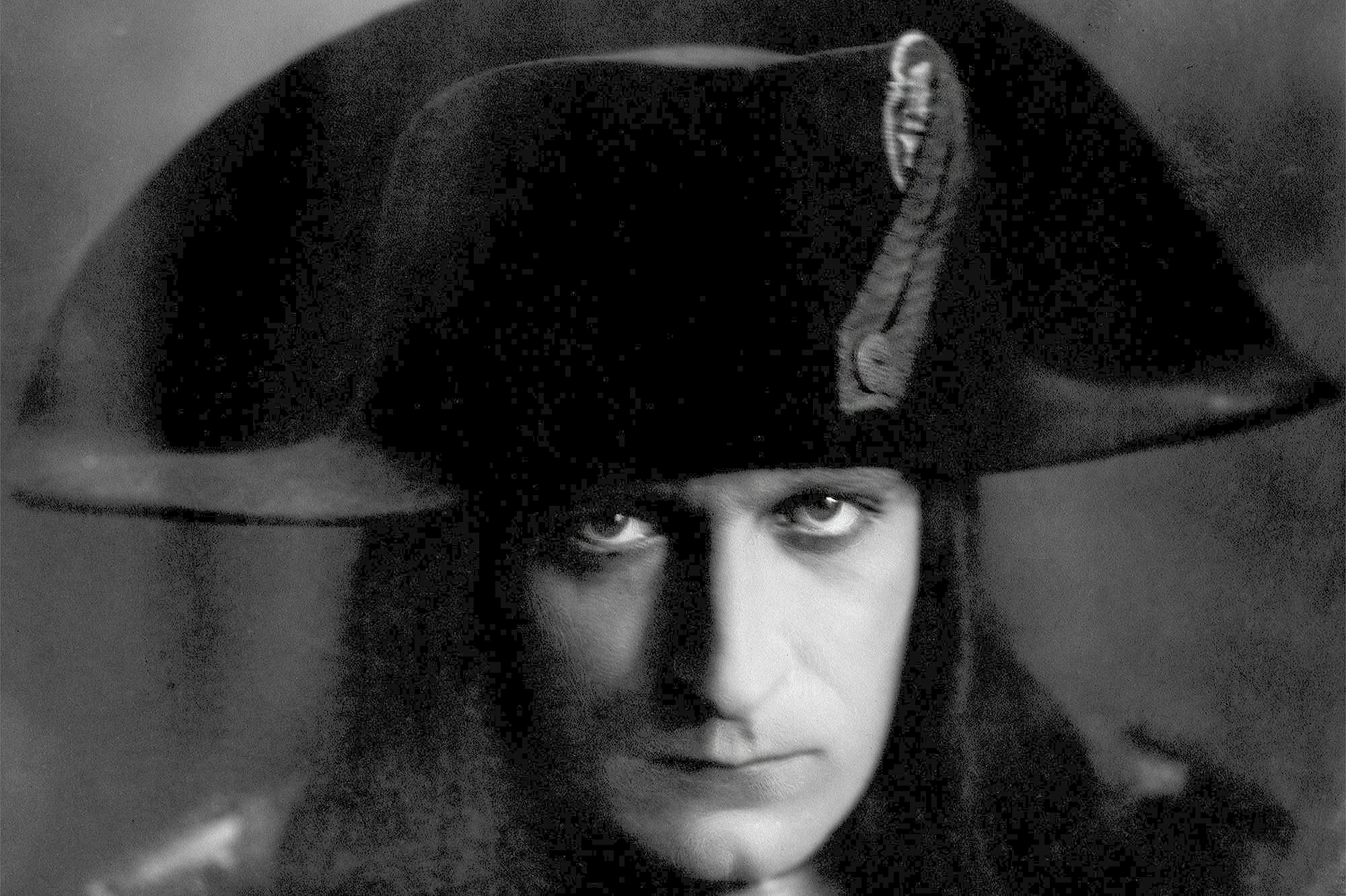
- Albert Dieudonné as Napoleon
- Born: 26 November 1889; Paris, France
- Died: 19 March 1976 (aged 86); Boulogne-Billancourt, France
- Occupations: Actor; screenwriter; film director; novelist
- Years active: 1917–1943
- Known for: Napoleon Bonaparte in Napoleon

Albert Dieudonné (26 November 1889 – 19 March 1976) was a French actor, screenwriter, film director and novelist.

== Biography ==
Dieudonné was born in Paris, France, and made his acting debut in silent film in 1908 for The Assassination of the Duke of Guise, with musical score by Camille Saint-Saëns. In 1924, he directed the film drama Catherine, in which he also appeared as a major character. Jean Renoir acted as his assistant director on the film.

Between 1915 and 1916, Dieudonné acted in five films for director Abel Gance, including the 1915 film La Folie du Docteur Tube and the 1916 film Le périscope. In 1925 he was hired back to star in the title role in Gance's epic film, Napoléon. In 1929 Dieudonné wrote a novel that was made into a 1930 musical comedy film titled The Sweetness of Loving, and he wrote the script for the 1936 La Garçonne.

Albert Dieudonné died in Paris in 1976 at the age of 86. According to his last wishes, he was buried wearing his Napoleon costume.

== Selected filmography ==
- La Folie du Docteur Tube (1915)
- Le périscope (1916)
- Anguish (1917)
- The Jackals (1917)
- The Crushed Idol (1920)
- Jacques Landauze (1920)
- Napoléon (1927)
- Madame Sans-Gêne (1941)
