= Romuald Joubé =

French actor (1876–1949)

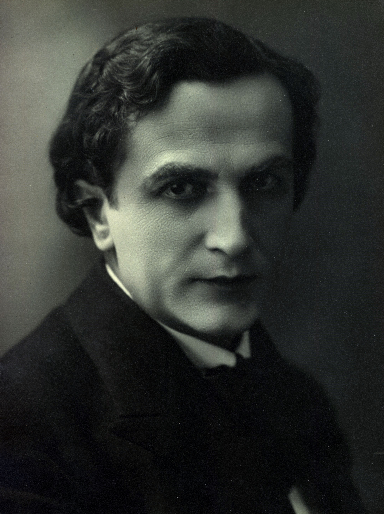
- Born: Romuald Charles Eugène Gaudens Jean Sylve Joubé; 20 June 1876; Mazères, Ariège, France
- Died: 14 September 1949 (aged 73); Gisors, Eure, France
- Occupation: Actor
- Years active: 1909–1943

Romuald Charles Eugène Gaudens Jean Sylve Joubé (20 June 1876 – 14 September 1949) was a French stage and film actor whose career on the stage and in films lasted approximately thirty years.

== Career ==
Born in Mazères, Ariège, Romuald Joubé began his stage career at the Odéon theatre under the direction of André Antoine. He was in residence at the Comédie Française from 1921 to 1922. Joubé's career was spent primarily on the theatre stage. However, he managed a lengthy film career as well, beginning in 1909. Joubé got his start in films in productions made by the early French film company Studio Film d'Art. In total, Joubé appeared in over forty films during a period of more than thirty years. He appeared as the character Jean Diaz in both the 1919 Abel Gance-directed silent film drama J'accuse! and Gance's 1938 eponymously titled sound film remake.

== Death ==
Romuald Joubé died in 1949 at the age of 73 in Gisors, Eure, France.

== Filmography ==
Year	Title	Role	Notes
1911	La mégère apprivoisée		
1913	Le baiser suprême		
1914	La reine Margot	Le comte de la Motte	
1917	The Corsican Brothers		
1917	Marie Tudor	Gilbert	
1917	Culprit	Chrétien Lescuyer	
1918	Les travailleurs de la mer	Gilliatt	
1918	Simone		
1918	André Cornélis		
1918	L'énigme	Vivarce	
1919	J'accuse!	Jean Diaz	
1919	Sublime offrande		
1920	La faute d'Odette Maréchal	Marcel Ferrat	
1921	Mademoiselle de La Seiglière	Bernard Stamply fils	
1921	Fleur des neiges	Etienne	
1921	Mathias Sandorf	Mathias Sandorf	
1922	La fille sauvage	Renaud Raigice	
1922	The Black Diamond	Monsieur de Fresnay	
1922	Rouletabille chez les bohémiens	Andréa	
1924	Mandrin	Mandrin	
1924	Le Miracle des loups	Le chevalier Robert Cottereau	
1925	La fanciulla di Pompei		
1926	La chèvre aux pieds d'or	Marc Brégyl – un avocat qui s'éprend de Toutcha	
1927	Frate Francesco		
1927	The Manor House of Fear	The Man in Black	
1928	Princess Masha	Roger Lantenac	
1937	The Pearls of the Crown	Clouet	Uncredited
1938	J'accuse!	Jean Diaz	
1942	Andorra ou les hommes d'Airain	Joan Xiriball	
1943	The Exile's Song	Pedro Etcheverry	
1943	Le brigand gentilhomme	Don Ruiz de Torilhas	(final film role)
