= Jacques Landauze =

1920 film

- Directed by: André Hugon
- Written by: Albert Dieudonné; André Hugon
- Starring: Marguerite de Barbieux; Maud Richard; Séverin-Mars
- Production company: Films André Hugon
- Distributed by: Pathé Frères
- Release date: 9 April 1920
- Country: France
- Languages: Silent; French intertitles

Jacques Landauze is a 1920 French silent drama film directed by André Hugon and starring Marguerite de Barbieux, Maud Richard and Séverin-Mars.

== Cast ==
- Marguerite de Barbieux as Denise Desgranges
- Maud Richard as Germaine Montazon
- Séverin-Mars as Jacques Landauze / Dumontel
- Jean Toulout as Montazon

== Bibliography ==
- Rège, Philippe. Encyclopedia of French Film Directors, Volume 1. Scarecrow Press, 2009. ISBN 978-0-8108-6939-4.
