= Le droit à la vie =

- Directed by: Abel Gance
- Written by: Abel Gance
- Produced by: Louis Nalpas
- Starring: Paul Vermoyal
- Cinematography: Léonce-Henri Burel
- Release date: 5 January 1917
- Country: France
- Languages: Silent; French intertitles

Le droit à la vie is a 1917 silent French film directed by Abel Gance.

== Cast ==
- Paul Vermoyal as Pierre Veryal
- Léon Mathot as Jacques Alberty
- Andrée Brabant as Andree Mael
- Georges Paulais as Marc Toln
- Eugénie Bade as Grandmother
- Lebrey as Magistrate
- Anthony Gildès
