= The Torture of Silence =

1917 French silent drama film

The Torture of Silence (Mater dolorosa)
- Directed by: Abel Gance
- Written by: Abel Gance
- Produced by: Louis Nalpas
- Starring: Emmy Lynn
- Cinematography: Léonce-Henri Burel
- Release date: 7 March 1917
- Running time: 80 minutes
- Country: France
- Languages: Silent; French intertitles

The Torture of Silence (French: Mater dolorosa) is a 1917 French silent drama film directed by Abel Gance.

== Cast ==
- Emmy Lynn as Manon Berliac
- Firmin Gémier as Emile Berliac
- Armand Tallier as François Rolland
- Anthony Gildès as Jean
- Paul Vermoyal as Jean Dormis
- Gaston Modot
- Antonin Carène
- Antonin Artaud

== Reception ==
Like many American films of the time, the French film The Torture of Silence was subject to cuts by city and state film censorship boards. The Chicago Board of Censors issued an Adults Only permit and required a cut in reel 2 of the last scene with the nude boy with sex visible.
