= Léon Mathot =

French actor and film director

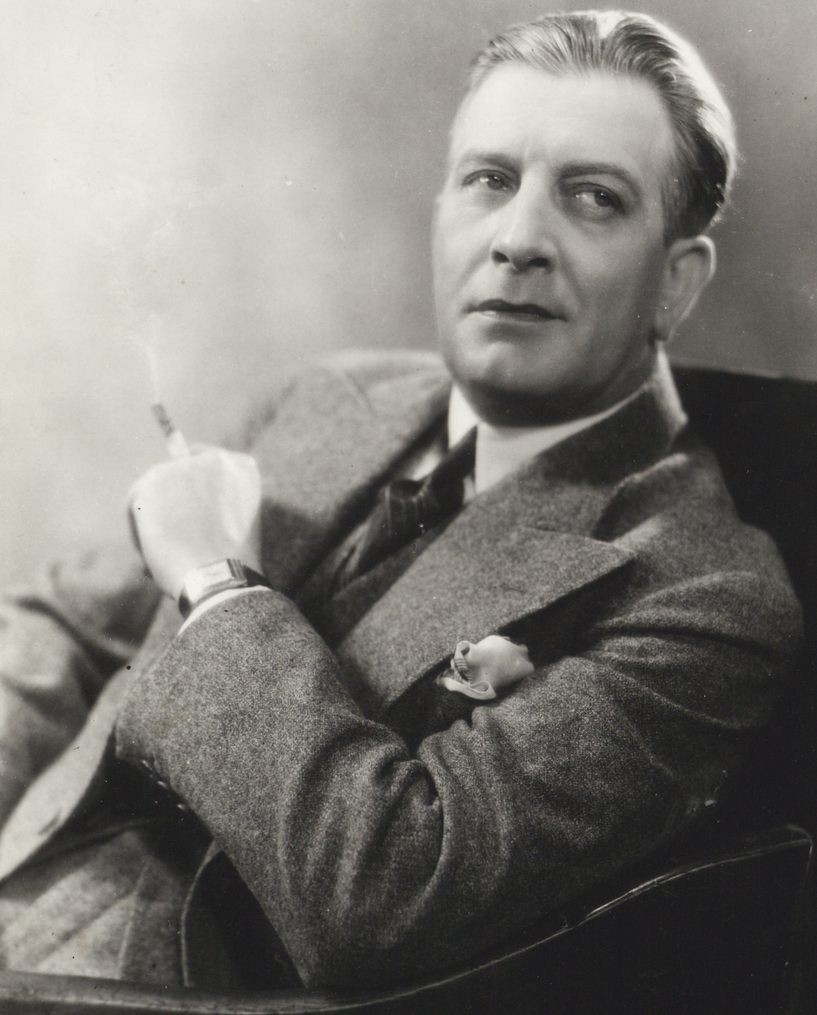
- Born: 5 March 1886; Roubaix, Nord-Pas-de-Calais, France
- Died: 6 March 1968 (aged 82); Paris, France
- Occupation: actor
- Years active: 1906–1939 (actor); 1927–1953 (director)

les Rivaux d'Arnheim, 1912.

Léon Mathot (5 March 1886 in Roubaix, Nord-Pas-de-Calais – 6 March 1968 in Paris) was a French film actor and film director best known perhaps for playing Edmond Dantes in The Count of Monte Cristo film serial in 1918.

He appeared in the 1923 silent film Coeur fidèle, directed by Jean Epstein.

He starred in some 60 films mostly in silent film between 1906 and 1939. He turned director in 1927 whilst still appearing in several films and retired in 1953 directing well over 20 films.

== Selected filmography ==
- Les Gaz mortels (1916)
- The Zone of Death (1917)
- Barberousse (1917)
- Le droit à la vie (1917)
- The Count of Monte Cristo (1918)
- In Old Alsace (1920)
- The Empire of Diamonds (1920)
- Blanchette (1921)
- Coeur fidèle (1923)
- The Red Inn (1923)
- My Uncle Benjamin (1924)
- The Painter and His Model (1925)
- Yasmina (1927)
- In the Shadow of the Harem (1928)
- La Maison de la Fléche (1930)
- The Mystery of the Villa Rose (1930)
- Instinct (1930)
- Passport 13.444 (1931)
- Kiss Me (1932)
- The Mascot (1935)
- Count Obligado (1935)
- Wolves Between Them (1936)
- Aloha, le chant des îles (1937)
- A Man to Kill (1937)
- Chéri-Bibi (1938)
- The Rebel (1938)
- Sacred Woods (1939)
- Immediate Call (1939)
- The Man Without a Name (1943)
- Night Warning (1946)
- The Tragic Dolmen (1948)
- The Dancer of Marrakesh (1949)
- My Childish Father (1953)
