= Jacques Grétillat =

French actor and film director

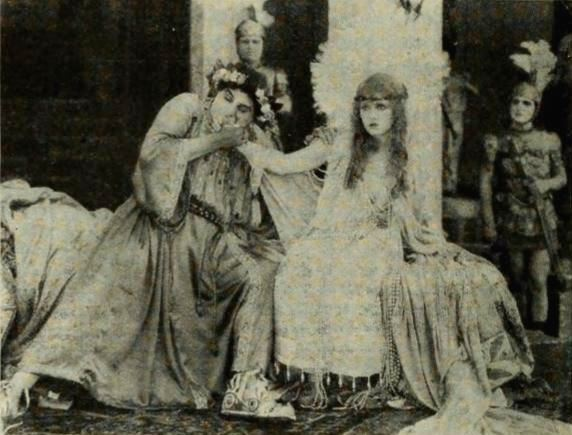
Grétillat as the emperor in Nero (1922) with Violet Mersereau.

Jacques Marie Gaëtan Grétillat (French: [ʒak ɡʁetija]; 26 August 1885 – 19 December 1950) was a French actor and film director.

Grétillat was born in Vitry-sur-Seine (Val-de-Marne), and died in Paris.

== Partial filmography ==
- Hamlet (1908, Short) - Hamlet
- Le traquenard (1915)
- Les soeurs ennemies (1915)
- The Corsican Brothers (1917)
- La proie (1917) - Marc de Ricardo
- Culprit (1917) - Prosper Aubry
- 48, avenue de l'Opéra (1917) - Jean Daumas
- Géo, le mystérieux (1917) - Géo
- Quarante H.P. (1919) - Comte de Clain
- L'effroyable doute (1919)
- La double existence du docteur Morart (1920) - Docteur Morart
- Déchéance (1920)
- Le père Goriot (1921) - Vautrin
- Nero (1922) - Nero
- La fille des chiffonniers (1922) - Dartès
- David Golder (1931) - Marcus, Golders früherer Sozius
- Pas sur la bouche (1931) - Le mari de Gilberte
- Danton (1932) - Danton
- The Red Robe (1934) - Mouzon
- The Bread Peddler (1934) - Garaud
- La flambée (1934)
- Bourrasque (1935) - Le caïd Belkacem
- Adémaï in the Middle Ages (1935) - Le connétable
- L'homme du jour (1937) - M. Legal
- À minuit, le 7 (1937) - Le juge d'instruction
- L'empreinte rouge (1937) - Suriano
- Gribouille (1937) - L'avocat de la défense
- If You Return (1938) - Monsieur Itier
- Gosse de riche (1938) - Gonfaron
- Café de Paris (1938) - Lambert
- The Chess Player (1938) - Potemkine
- Entente cordiale (1939) - Le député Roussel
- Les 3 tambours (1939) - Le représentant du peuple
- Facing Destiny (1940) - Le chargé d'affaire
- Strangers in the House (1942) - Le président des Assises
- Shot in the Night (1943) - Monsieur du Coudrais
- Les Roquevillard (1943) - Porterieux
- Coup de tête (1944) - Le valet de pied (uncredited)
- Pamela (1945) - Le Villeheurnois
- Quai des Orfèvres (1947) - Auguste (final film role)

== Bibliography ==
- Abel, Richard. The ciné goes to town: French cinema, 1896-1914. University of California Press, 1998
- Gallagher, Tag. John Ford: The Man and his Films. University of California Press, 1988.
