= Barberousse =

- Directed by: Abel Gance
- Written by: Abel Gance
- Produced by: Louis Nalpas
- Starring: Léon Mathot
- Cinematography: Léonce-Henri Burel
- Release date: 13 April 1917
- Country: France
- Languages: Silent; French intertitles

Barberousse is a 1917 silent French film directed by Abel Gance.

== Cast ==
- Léon Mathot as Trively
- Émile Keppens as Gesmus
- Maud Richard as Odette Trively
- Germaine Pelisse as Pauline
- Yvonne Briey
- Henri Maillard
- Doriani
- Paul Vermoyal
