= Braye-en-Laonnois =

- Commune
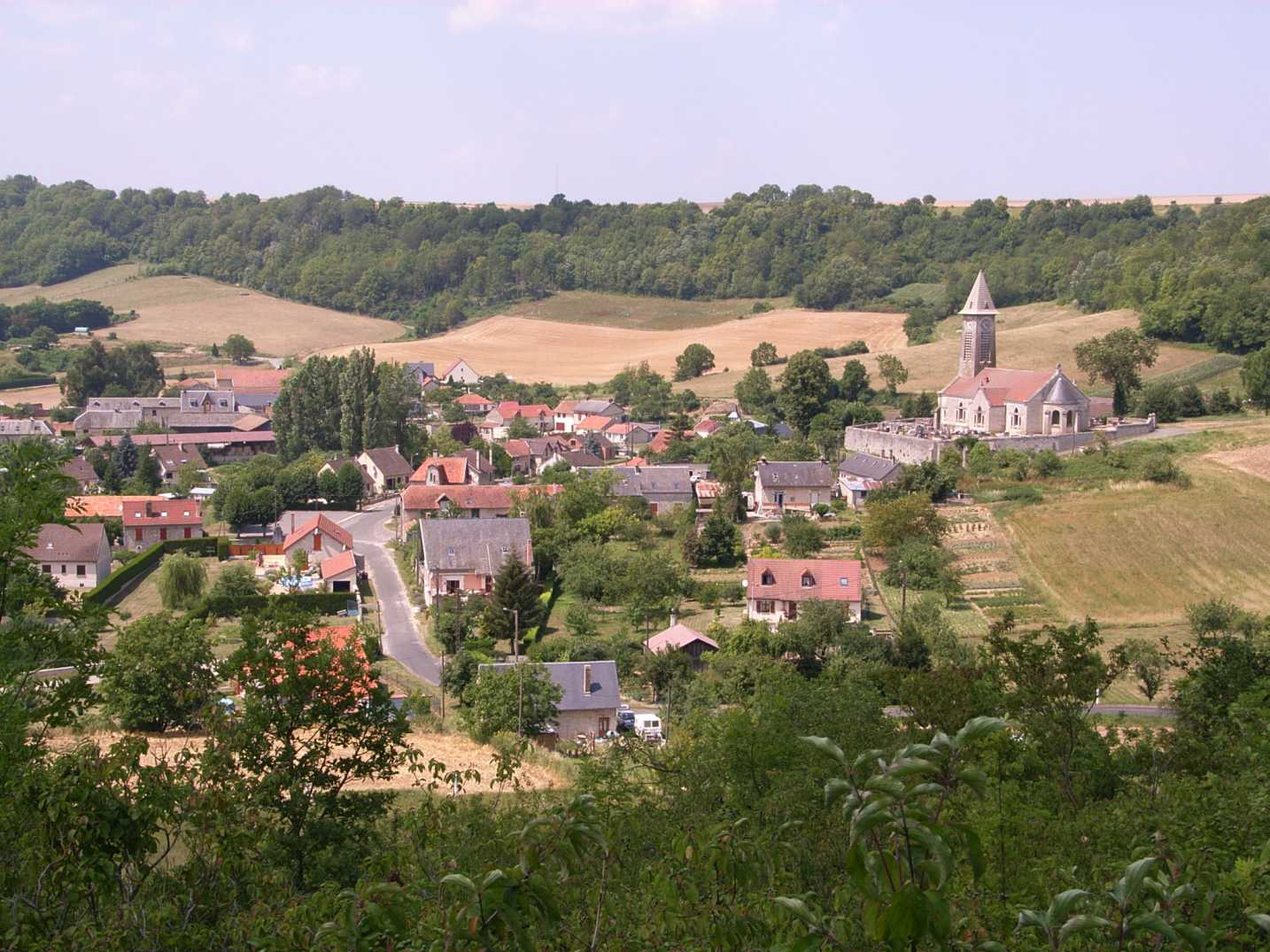
- A general view of Braye-en-Laonnois
- Location of Braye-en-Laonnois
- Location within France Location within Hauts-de-France
- Coordinates: 49°26′31″N 3°36′32″E
- Country: France
- Region: Hauts-de-France
- Department: Aisne
- Arrondissement: Laon
- Canton: Villeneuve-sur-Aisne
- Intercommunality: Chemin des Dames

Government
  - Mayor (2026–32): Françoise Pilloy
- Area^{1}: 8.09 km^{2} (3.12 sq mi)
- Elevation: 96 m (315 ft)
- Highest elevation: 196 m (643 ft)
- Lowest elevation: 63 m (207 ft)
- Population (2023): 195
  - Density: 24.1/km^{2} (62.4/sq mi)
- Time zone: UTC+01:00 (CET)
  - Summer (DST): UTC+02:00 (CEST)
- INSEE/Postal code: 02115 /02000
- ^{1} French Land Register data, which excludes lakes, ponds, glaciers > 1 km^{2} (0.386 sq mi or 247 acres) and river estuaries.

Braye-en-Laonnois is a commune in the department of Aisne in Hauts-de-France in northern France.

== Population ==
Historical population
Year	Pop.	±% p.a.
1968	237	—
1975	229	−0.49%
1982	209	−1.30%
1990	192	−1.05%
1999	195	+0.17%
2007	214	+1.17%
2012	223	+0.83%
2017	203	−1.86%
2023	195	−0.67%
Source: INSEE

== Residents ==
Braye-en-Laonnois is the birthplace of stage and film actor Paul Vermoyal (1888-1925).

== See also ==
- Communes of the Aisne department
