= Les Gaz mortels =

- Directed by: Abel Gance
- Written by: Abel Gance
- Produced by: Louis Nalpas
- Starring: Maud Richard
- Cinematography: Léonce-Henri Burel
- Release date: 1 September 1916
- Running time: 71 minutes (18 frame/s)
- Country: France
- Languages: Silent; French intertitles

Les Gaz mortels is a 1916 silent French film directed by Abel Gance.

== Plot ==
Les Gaz mortels (1916)

The famous French chemist Hopson is on a study trip to Texas. He is assisted by Mathus and supplied with snakes (the objects of his research) by Ted, a drunkard who torments Maud. Maud ends up writing to Hopson, who takes her directly into his service just as World War One has broken out, leading them to return to France. Ted follows them to seek revenge...

== Cast ==
- Maud Richard : Maud
- Léon Mathot : Mathus
- Émile Keppens : Edgar Ravely
- Doriani : Ted
- Henri Maillard : Dr Hopson
- Jean Fleury : André, Hopson's grandson
- Germaine Pelisse : Olga Ravely
