= The Corsican Brothers (1917 film) =

- Directed by: André Antoine
- Written by: Alexandre Dumas (novella)
- Starring: Henry Krauss; Romuald Joubé; Rose Dione
- Cinematography: Paul Castanet
- Production company: Pathé Frères
- Distributed by: Pathé Frères
- Release date: 26 January 1917
- Country: France
- Languages: Silent; French intertitles

The Corsican Brothers (French: Les frères corses) is a 1917 French silent adventure film directed by André Antoine and starring Henry Krauss, Romuald Joubé and Rose Dione. It is based on the 1844 novella The Corsican Brothers by Alexandre Dumas.

== Cast ==
- Henry Krauss as Dumas père
- Romuald Joubé
- Rose Dione
- Jacques Grétillat
- Henry Roussel
- Gaston Glass
- Philippe Garnier
- André Brulé
- Max Charlier

== Bibliography ==
- Levine, Alison. Framing the Nation: Documentary Film in Interwar France. A&C Black, 2011.
