= Mathias Sandorf (1921 film) =

1921 film

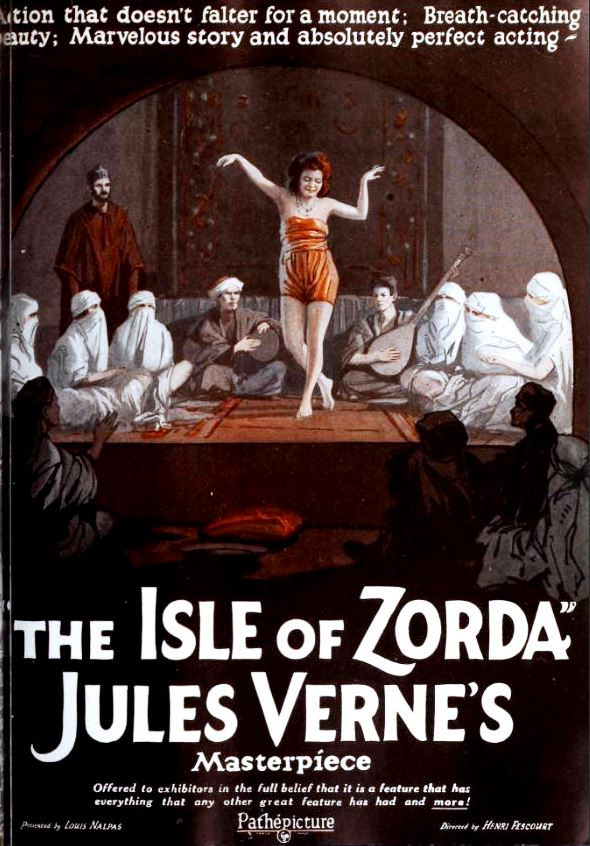
- Directed by: Henri Fescourt
- Written by: Henri Fescourt
- Based on: Mathias Sandorf by Jules Verne
- Produced by: Louis Nalpas; Serge Sandberg
- Starring: Romuald Joubé; Yvette Andréyor; Jean Toulout
- Cinematography: Paul Parguel
- Edited by: Mario Nalpas
- Production company: Les Films Louis Nalpas
- Distributed by: Union-Éclair
- Release date: 15 July 1921
- Country: France
- Languages: Silent; French intertitles

Mathias Sandorf is a 1921 French historical adventure film directed by Henri Fescourt and starring Romuald Joubé, Yvette Andréyor and Jean Toulout. It is an adaptation of the 1885 novel Mathias Sandorf by Jules Verne. A later sound version of the story Mathias Sandorf was released in 1963. The film was distributed in America by Pathe Exchange under the alternative title The Isle of Zorda.

Some scenes were shot around Nice on the French Riviera.

== Cast ==
- Romuald Joubé as Mathias Sandorf
- Yvette Andréyor as Sava Toronthal
- Jean Toulout as Silas Toronthal
- Paul Vermoyal as Sarcany
- Gaston Modot as Carpéna
- Armand Tallier as Pierre Bathory
- Armand Dutertre as Birik
- Henri Maillard as Ferrato
- Gabrielle Ristori as Maria Ferrato
- Mario Nasthasio as Zirone
- Djemil Anik as Nasmir
- Germaine Pelisse as Mme. Toronthal
- Adeline de La Croix as Mme. Bathory
- Darnay as Étienne Bathory
- Benvenuto Nardo as Pescade
- Milo Poggi as Matifou

== Bibliography ==
- Geoffrey Nowell-Smith. The Oxford History of World Cinema. Oxford University Press, 1996.
