= Le périscope =

- Directed by: Abel Gance
- Written by: Abel Gance
- Produced by: Louis Nalpas
- Starring: Albert Dieudonné
- Cinematography: Léonce-Henri Burel
- Release date: 1916
- Country: France
- Languages: Silent; French intertitles

Le périscope is a 1916 silent French film directed by Abel Gance.

== Cast ==
- Albert Dieudonné as William Bell
- Henri Maillard as Damores
- Yvonne Sergyl as Manoela Damores
- Georges Raulin as Geoffrey Bell
- Mlle Savigny as Clelia Damores
