= La Folie du Docteur Tube =

1915 film

La Folie du docteur Tube
- Directed by: Abel Gance
- Written by: Abel Gance
- Produced by: Louis Nalpas
- Starring: Séverin-Mars; Albert Dieudonné
- Cinematography: Léonce-Henri Burel
- Release date: 1915
- Running time: 10 minutes
- Country: France
- Languages: Silent; French intertitles

La Folie du docteur Tube is a 1915 short silent experimental film directed by Abel Gance, in which a scientist takes a white, cocaine-like powder which makes him hallucinate. Gance shows the man's hallucinations by using a series of distorting mirrors and ordinary lenses, because no distorting lenses were available at this moment in time. A copy of the film is preserved at the Cinémathèque française and has been digitised.

== Plot ==
La Folie du Docteur Tube (1915)

A famous and whimsical Doctor Tube invents a powder that makes people deformed. He first tries the experiment on a dog, then on his assistant, a black child, and on himself. The result amuses them a lot. He then sprays some powder on two lovely young girls who visit him, who are devastated by the result, as well as their fiancés who receive the same treatment. The bodies are so deformed that they become unrecognizable. The four young people come to blows with the professor, who then tells them that all they need to do is get rid of the dust that covers their clothes to regain a normal shape. Everything goes back to normal and the adventure ends around a table and a bottle of champagne.

== Production ==
Abel Gance, about The Madness of Doctor Tube: "[...] I got drunk too quickly and said: 'I'm going to impress them all at the cinema because I have a very powerful idea.' I had the idea of writing The Madness of Doctor Tube. It was a story with the decomposition of light rays, which makes things no longer seen at all from the angle from which we see them. I used distorting mirrors, I did everything that I technically imagined the audience would appreciate immensely because it had never been done, and when I showed this film to the director and the people who interested in me, they said to themselves: 'He's crazy, we mustn't entrust him with a penny anymore, he's going to ruin us.'"

== Cast ==
- Séverin-Mars as Dr Tube
- Albert Dieudonné as a young man
