= Léonce-Henri Burel =

French cinematographer

- Born: 23 November 1892; Indre, Loire-Atlantique, France
- Died: 21 March 1977 (aged 84); Mougins, Alpes-Maritimes, France
- Occupation: Cinematographer
- Years active: 1914–1972

Léonce-Henri Burel (French pronunciation: [leɔ̃s ɑ̃ʁi byʁɛl] 23 November 1892 – 21 March 1977) was a French cinematographer whose career extended from the silent era until the early 1970s. He was the director of photography on more than 120 films, working almost exclusively in black-and-white.

== Career ==
After studying at the University of Nantes, he initially worked as a photoengraver before becoming a camera operator. At the Film d'Art company in 1915 he was noticed by Abel Gance and began a collaboration with him which extended over 16 films, including J'accuse, La Roue, and Napoléon. In the period of silent films he also worked on several productions with Jacques Feyder. During the 1930s he worked regularly with Jean Dréville and Henri Decoin. With Le Journal d'un curé de campagne, for which he won the best cinematography award at the Venice Film Festival in 1951, Burel began another important collaboration with the director Robert Bresson which continued through three further films. Burel also directed three films himself between 1922 and 1932.

== Selected filmography ==
- 1915: La Folie du docteur Tube, directed by Abel Gance
- 1917: Mater dolorosa (The Torture of Silence), directed by Abel Gance
- 1918: La Dixième Symphonie (The Tenth Symphony), directed by Abel Gance
- 1918: Le Comte de Monte Cristo, directed by Henri Pouctal
- 1919: J'accuse, directed by Abel Gance
- 1921: La Roue, directed by Abel Gance
- 1922: Crainquebille, directed by Jacques Feyder
- 1925: Visages d'enfants (Faces of Children), directed by Jacques Feyder
- 1926: Michel Strogoff, directed by Victor Tourjansky
- 1927: Napoléon, directed by Abel Gance
- 1927: Casanova (The Loves of Casanova), directed by Alexandre Volkoff
- 1928: L'Équipage (The Crew), directed by Maurice Tourneur
- 1929: The Three Passions, directed by Rex Ingram
- 1929: Vénus, directed by Louis Mercanton
- 1930: Nuits de princes (Nights of Princes), directed by Marcel L'Herbier
- 1931: La Femme d'une nuit, directed by Marcel L'Herbier
- 1932: La Femme nue (The Nude Woman), directed by Jean-Paul Paulin
- 1934: Le Petit Jacques (Little Jacques), directed by Gaston Roudès
- 1938: Retour à l'aube (Return at Dawn), directed by Henri Decoin
- 1940: Vénus aveugle, directed by Abel Gance
- 1942: La Belle Aventure (The Beautiful Adventure), directed Marc Allégret
- 1949: Suzanne et ses brigands (Suzanne and the Robbers), directed by Yves Ciampi
- 1949: Valse brillante (Brilliant Waltz), directed by Jean Boyer
- 1949: Le Mystère Barton (The Barton Mystery), directed by Charles Spaak
- 1951: Journal d'un curé de campagne (Diary of a Country Priest), directed by Robert Bresson
- 1955: La Madone des sleepings (Madonna of the Sleeping Cars), directed by Henri Diamant-Berger
- 1956: Un condamné à mort s'est échappé (A Man Escaped), directed by Robert Bresson
- 1959: Pickpocket, directed by Robert Bresson
- 1961: Un soir sur la plage (One Night on the Beach), directed by Michel Boisrond
- 1962: Procès de Jeanne d'Arc (The Trial of Joan of Arc), directed by Robert Bresson
- 1963: Chair de poule, directed by Julien Duvivier
