= Salvo D'Acquisto =

Member of the Italian Carabinieri and Servant of God

Venerable Salvo D'Acquisto
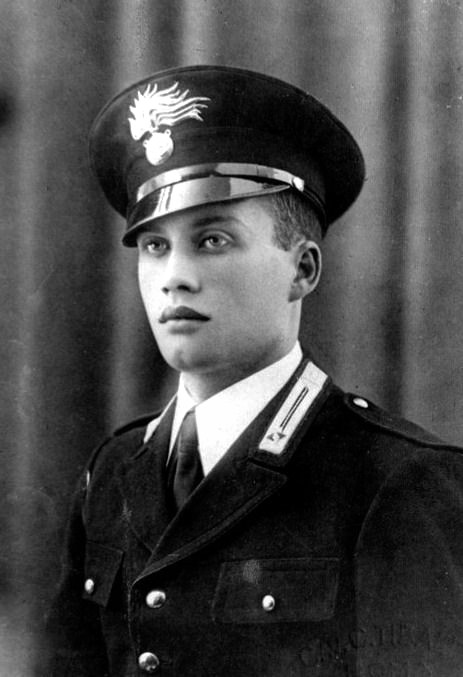
- D'Acquisto, c. 1939
- Born: Salvo Rosario Antonio D'Acquisto; 15 October 1920; Naples, Kingdom of Italy
- Died: 23 September 1943 (aged 22); Fiumicino, Kingdom of Italy
- Cause of death: Execution by firing squad

Salvo Rosario Antonio D'Acquisto MOVM (15 October 1920 – 23 September 1943) was a member of the Italian Carabinieri during the Second World War.

After Italy surrendered in September 1943 to the Allies, the Germans occupied most of the country. On 22 September, two German soldiers were killed and two others wounded when some boxes of abandoned munitions they were inspecting exploded. The Germans insisted it was sabotage, and the next day they rounded up 22 civilians to try to get them to name the saboteurs. The soldiers made the prisoners dig their own graves when they continued to assert their innocence. D'Acquisto, in charge of the local Carabinieri post, was taken to the prisoners. When it became clear that the Germans intended to kill them, D'Acquisto "confessed" to being solely responsible. He was executed by firing squad, but the civilians were released unharmed.

D'Acquisto was posthumously awarded the Gold Medal of Military Valour. He was given the title Servant of God by Pope John Paul II. In 2025, Pope Francis declared him venerable.

== Life ==
Salvo D'Acquisto was born in Naples, the eldest of eight children, three of whom died as infants and another as a child. His father worked in a chemical factory. He left school at the age of 14, as was customary for working-class boys at the time.

D'Acquisto volunteered to join the Carabinieri in 1939 and left for Libya the following year, a few months before the start of the Second World War. After being wounded in the leg, he remained with his division until he contracted malaria. He returned to Italy in 1942 to attend officer school. He graduated as a vice-sergeant and was assigned to an outpost in Torre in Pietra, a little rural centre on the Via Aurelia not far from Rome. On 25 July 1943, Benito Mussolini was overthrown, and the new Italian government negotiated secretly with the Allies to switch sides. An armistice was officially announced on 8 September.

=== Death ===
After the 9–11 September fighting in Rome, elements of the German Luftwaffe 2nd Parachute Division were detached to coastal defence duties, and a small unit was camped near an old military installation previously used by the Guardia di Finanza, in the vicinity of Palidoro, frazione of Fiumicino, which was in the territorial jurisdiction of the station of Torre in Pietra, another frazione of the same municipality. Here, on 22 September, German soldiers were inspecting boxes of abandoned munitions when there was an explosion. Two died and two others were wounded.

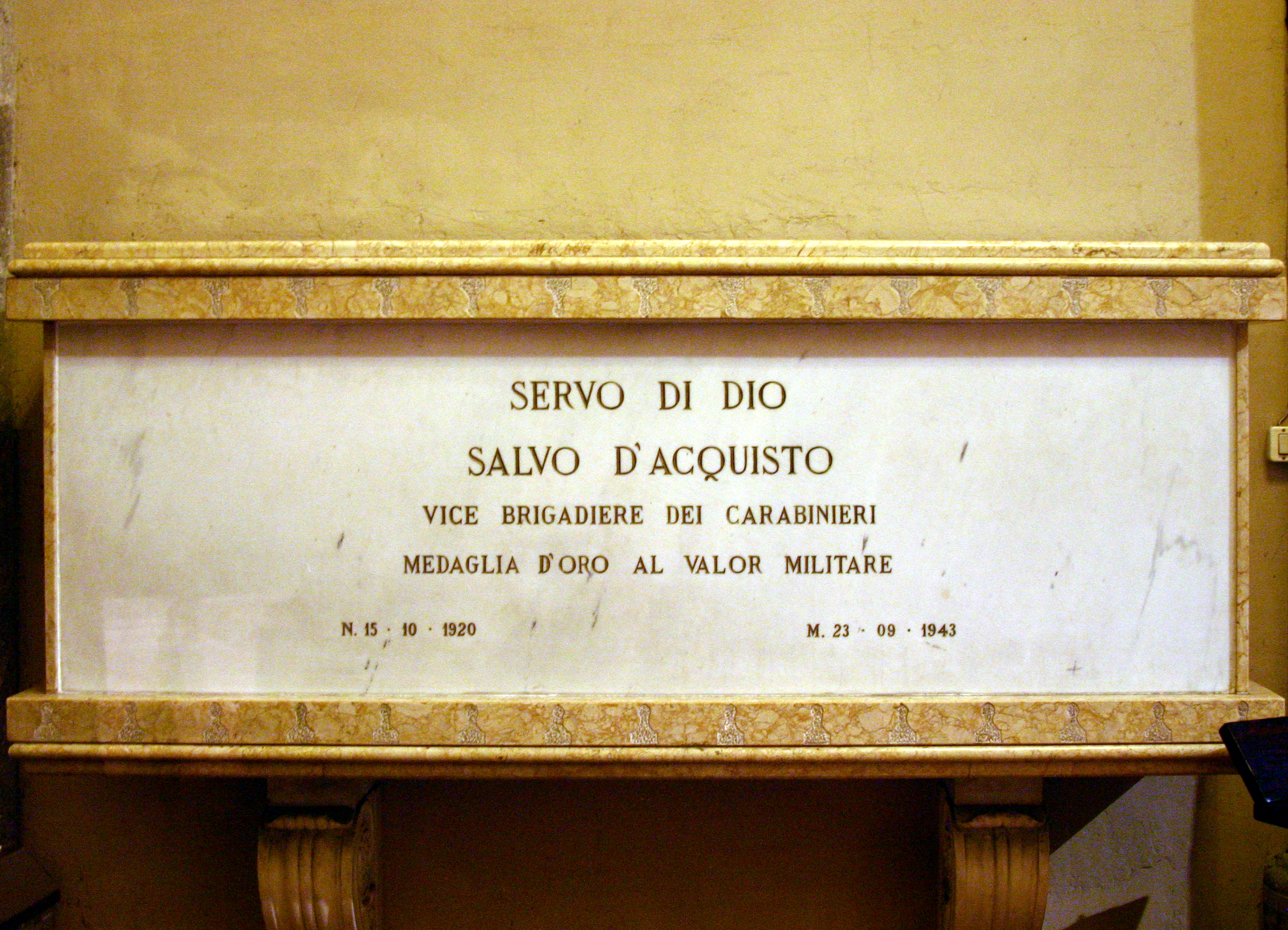
D'Acquisto's tomb in Santa Chiara, Naples

The commander of the German detachment blamed the death on "unnamed locals" and demanded the cooperation of the local Carabinieri post, at the moment under D'Acquisto's temporary command. The next morning, D'Acquisto, having gathered some information, tried in vain to explain that the deaths were an accident, but the Germans insisted on their version of events and demanded reprisals, according to a standing order issued by Generalfeldmarschall Kesselring.

On 23 September, the Germans conducted searches and arrested 22 local residents. An armed squad took D'Acquisto by force from the station to the Torre di Palidoro, an ancient watchtower, where the prisoners were gathered. Under interrogation, all of the civilians said that they were innocent. When the Germans again demanded the names of the responsible persons, D'Acquisto replied that there were none – the explosion was accidental. The Germans ridiculed, insulted, and beat him, and tore his uniform.

Suddenly, the prisoners were handed shovels and forced to dig a mass grave for their own burial after execution. The digging went on for some time; when it was completed, it was obvious the Germans meant to carry out their threat. D'Acquisto then "confessed" to the alleged crime, declared that he alone was responsible for the "murder" and that the civilians were innocent, and demanded that they be released right away. One of those freed, 17- or 18-year-old Angelo Amadio, witnessed the execution by firing squad. D'Acquisto was 22.

== Cause of beatification ==
In 1983, Archbishop Gaetano Bonicelli announced the opening of a cause for beatification and canonization in the Military Ordinariate of Italy, Pope John Paul II declared D'Acquisto a Servant of God. The process of beatification of D'Acquisto took place on 4 November 1983 and ended on 25 November 1991 with the consequent transmission of the documents to the Congregation for the Causes of Saints.

On 15 October 1987, Gaudenzio Dell'Aja was appointed by Cardinal Corrado Ursi, Archbishop of Naples, archbishop delegate of the ecclesiastical tribunal for the canonical recognition of the mortal remains of D'Acquisto, which was carried out on 18 October 1987, at the Basilica of Santa Chiara in Naples, in the first chapel on the left, near the entrance.

In 1996, the same Congregation received a supplement of inquiry at the behest of the new postulator. Although the initial had begun the cause of beatification with the aim of obtain recognition of the subject's "heroic virtues", the subsequent postulator requested the recognition of the "heroic witness of charity," a definition pertaining to martyrs. In 2007, however, a majority vote taken in an internal forum of the Congregation for the Causes of Saints led to a suspension of the recognition as a martyr. D'Acquisto was remembered by Pope John Paul II, who in a speech to the Carabinieri on 26 February 2001 said:

The history of the Carabinieri shows that one can reach the peak of holiness in the faithful and generous fulfilment of the duties of one's state. I am thinking here of your colleague, vice-sergeant Salvo D'Acquisto, gold medal for military valour, whose cause for beatification is underway.

== Legacy ==
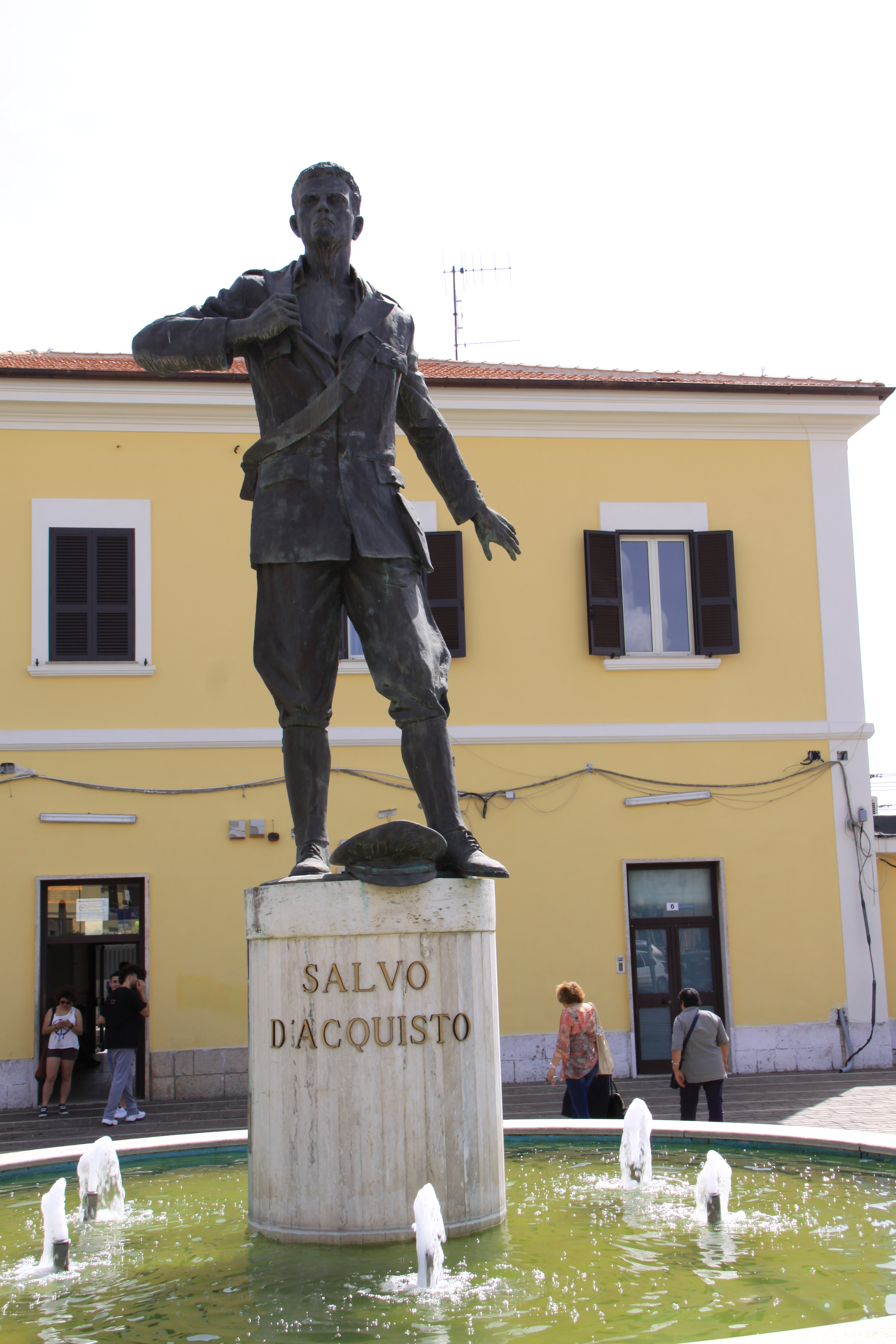
Statue of Salvo D'Acquisto, located in front of the train station at Cisterna, Italy

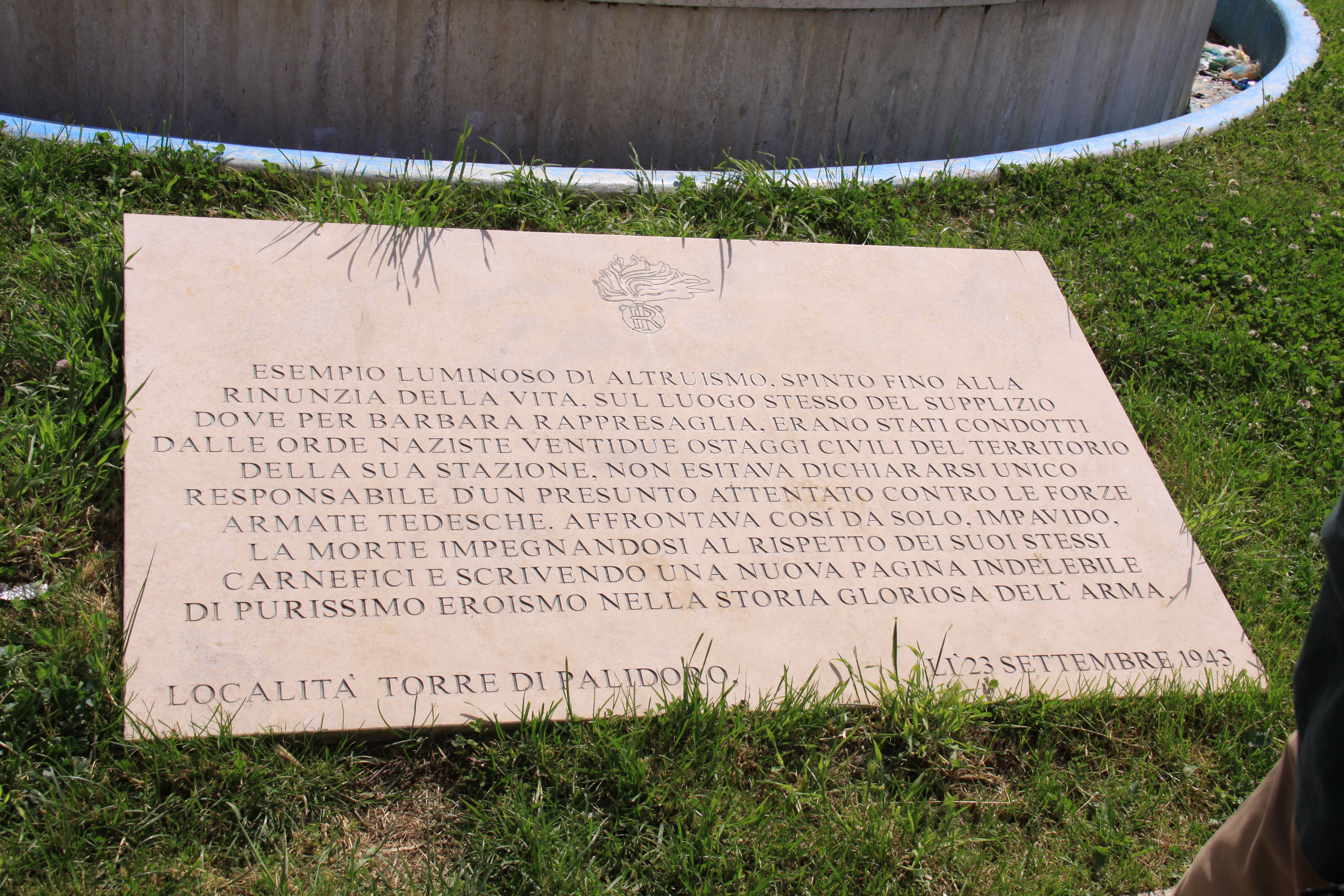
Memorial plaque to Salvo D'Acquisto

An Italian war drama film, Fiamma che non si spegne (1949), directed by Vittorio Cottafavi and starring Gino Cervi, was inspired by his sacrifice, as was an Italian biographical drama film, Salvo D'Acquisto (1974), directed by Romolo Guerrieri and starring Massimo Ranieri. A 2003 TV mini-series about his story was directed by Alberto Sironi and starred Beppe Fiorello.

An Italian postage stamp was issued in 1975 to commemorate him. The portrait was painted by the Italian artist Silvano Campeggi. There are monuments honouring D'Acquisto, including in his native Naples, on the Via Aurelia near Rome, and in front of the train station at Cisterna.

== Quote ==
"We have to conform ourselves to God's will whatever the cost in suffering or sacrifice."
