= La Digue (film) =

1911 film

- Directed by: Abel Gance
- Written by: Abel Gance
- Starring: Robert Lévy
- Release date: 1911; (unreleased)
- Country: France
- Languages: Silent; French intertitles

La Digue is a 1911 silent French film directed by Abel Gance. It was Gance's debut film. The film was never released.

== Cast ==
- Robert Lévy
- Paulette Noizeux
- Pierre Renoir
- Jean Toulout
