= Andrée Brabant =

French actress (1901–1989)

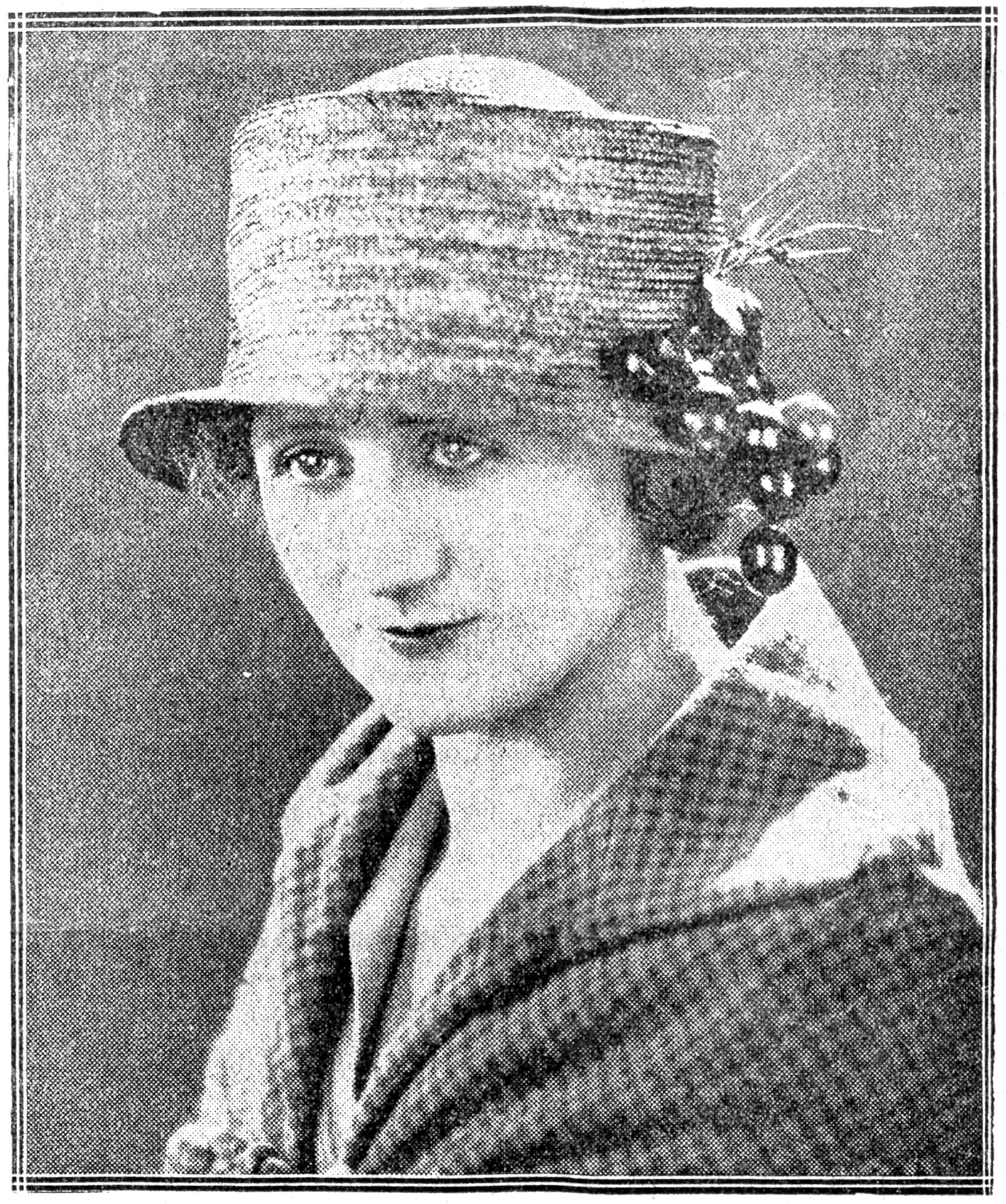
- Born: 23 May 1901; Reims, France
- Died: 2 November 1989 (aged 88); Toulon, France
- Occupation: Actress
- Years active: 1916–1964 (film)

Marie Thérèse "Andrée" Brabant (French pronunciation: [maʁi teʁɛz ɑ̃dʁe bʁabɑ̃]; 1901–1989) was a French film actress. She played a number of leading roles during the silent era.

== Selected filmography ==
- Le droit à la vie (1917)
- The Zone of Death (1917)
- La cigarette (1919)
- Flipotte (1920)
- The Secret of Polichinelle (1923)
- Princess Masha (1927)
- The Marriage of Mademoiselle Beulemans (1927)
- Madame Récamier (1928)
- Cousin Bette (1928)
- Fire in the Straw (1939)
- That Tender Age (1964)

== Bibliography ==
- Goble, Alan. The Complete Index to Literary Sources in Film. Walter de Gruyter, 1999.
