= Silvano Campeggi =

Italian painter (1923–2018)

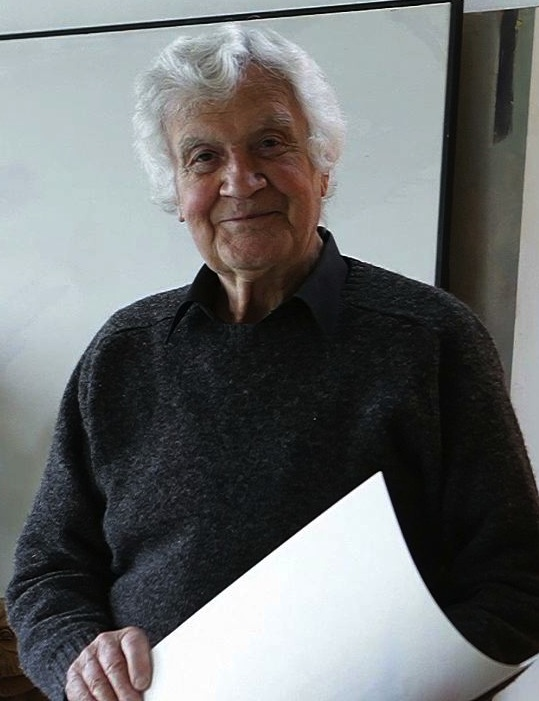
- Campeggi in 2011
- Born: 23 January 1923; Florence, Italy
- Died: 29 August 2018 (aged 95); Florence, Italy
- Occupation: Poster designer
- Years active: 1945–2015

Silvano "Nano" Campeggi (Italian pronunciation: [silˈvaːno kamˈpeddʒi]; January 23, 1923 – August 29, 2018) was an Italian artist who designed and produced the artwork for the posters of many classic Hollywood films. His iconic images are associated with the golden era of Hollywood and Campeggi is now generally regarded as the most important graphic artist and poster designer in the history of American cinema.

== Early life ==
Campeggi's father, a printer and typesetter, exposed him to the world of graphics and design. He attended the art school at Porta Romana, Florence, studying under accomplished painters of the time such as Ottone Rosai and Ardengo Soffici.

== Hollywood career ==
Campeggi's first career breakthrough came with a World War II commission from the American Red Cross to paint the portraits of American soldiers before they returned home. This deepened his understanding of American music, film and culture. After the war he moved to Rome, where he was approached by Metro-Goldwyn-Mayer for whom he produced the poster for Gone with the Wind., with Clark Gable holding Vivien Leigh in passionate embrace while Atlanta burned in the background.

In the following decades, Campeggi designed and produced the poster and advertising graphics for over 3000 films, working not only under contract with the MGM studios, but also with Warner Brothers, Paramount, Universal, Columbia Pictures, United Artists, RKO, Twentieth-Century Fox and several other movie studios. Sixty-four of the films he illustrated won Oscars, including Casablanca, Ben-Hur, Singin' in the Rain, An American in Paris, West Side Story, Exodus, Breakfast at Tiffany's, and Gigi.

Many of his images of Hollywood actresses are instantly recognizable: Liza Minnelli in derby hat and black stockings, Elizabeth Taylor, Lauren Bacall in beret and cape, Ava Gardner, Rita Hayworth, Sophia Loren. Equally, he portrayed the male stars: Marlon Brando astride his motorcycle as "The Wild One", a bare-chested James Dean, John Wayne neckerchief and cowboy hat, Humphrey Bogart in his white dinner jacket.

Many of Campeggi's subjects became close personal friends. Ava Gardner asked him to accompany her down the red carpet at one of her movie premieres. His wife recounted a story of Elizabeth Taylor lending her maternity clothes after having just given birth herself. He described Marilyn Monroe, whom he first painted in the early 1950s, as "my icon and surely the most enchanting woman I have ever met."

== Return to Italy ==
In the 1970s when film poster illustration lost impact in the face of television and newspaper advertising, Campeggi returned to Florence. There he painted a series of 50 images depicting Siena's Palio horse race (2001). Another series of 50 images "I Have Seen the Rush of Jousts" (2003) was commissioned by the city of Arezzo to celebrate the Jousting Tournaments of Saracen, the title taken from Dante's Inferno.

Campeggi's other important commissions included the painting of five large battle scenes from the Italian Risorgimento on behalf of the Carabinieri police force (early 1970s); a portrait of the Italian Resistance hero Salvo D'Acquisto which appeared as an Italian postage stamp (1975); a series of 35 images for the City of Florence depicting their traditional "Calcio Storico" soccer match (1997); and the creation of one of the Stations of the Cross for the rededication of the city of Assisi (2004). Campeggi's best known work in Italy may be the Portrait of Garibaldi.

In 2008, for the 150th anniversary of the birth of Giacomo Puccini, Campeggi was commissioned to produce a special tribute: "The Girls of Puccini". Also in 2008 he began work on a Napoleon series to commemorate the 200th anniversary of the Emperor's association with the island of Elba. The "Napoleon at Elba" exhibition opened in September 2008 at Portoferraio.

The most recent Campeggi exhibition commemorated one of the largest armed conflicts ever to take place in Italy – The Battle of Campaldino fought between the cities of Florence and Arezzo on June 11, 1289. It is a spectacular assembly of large and dramatic battle scenes combined with more intimate portraits of the knights and noblemen who led the cavalry and infantry – all liberally splashed with “I Colori Della Battaglia”

Campeggi died on 29 August 2018, at the age of 95.

== Major exhibitions ==
- The Movies Through the Posters of Silvano Campeggi - The Medici Riccardi Palace, Florence (1988, subsequently touring to Paris and New York)
- Bozzetti (Final Sketches) – Exhibition Palace, Rome (1995, partially touring to New York and Chicago)
- Florentine Women Through the Ages – Uffizi Gallery, Florence (2006)
- 3000 Times – The Art of the Movie Poster - Film Society of Lincoln Center, New York (2007)
- Elba – Island of the Emperor – Co-sponsored by the Region of Tuscany, the Province of Livorno and the Town Council of Portoferriao, Portoferriao, Italy (2008)
- The Women of Puccini – Co-sponsored by the Puccini Festival, The Town Council of Viareggio and the Region of Tuscany, Rive del Lago, Italy (2009, scheduled for a world tour 2010)
- Campaldino – Battle Colors – Major co-sponsors: the Bank of Etruria, the Region of Tuscany and the Province of Arezzo, Popi, Italy (2009)

== Awards ==
- Fiorino D'Oro (2000) – Italy's most prestigious award for artistic achievement.
