= J'accuse (1919 film) =

1919 French silent film

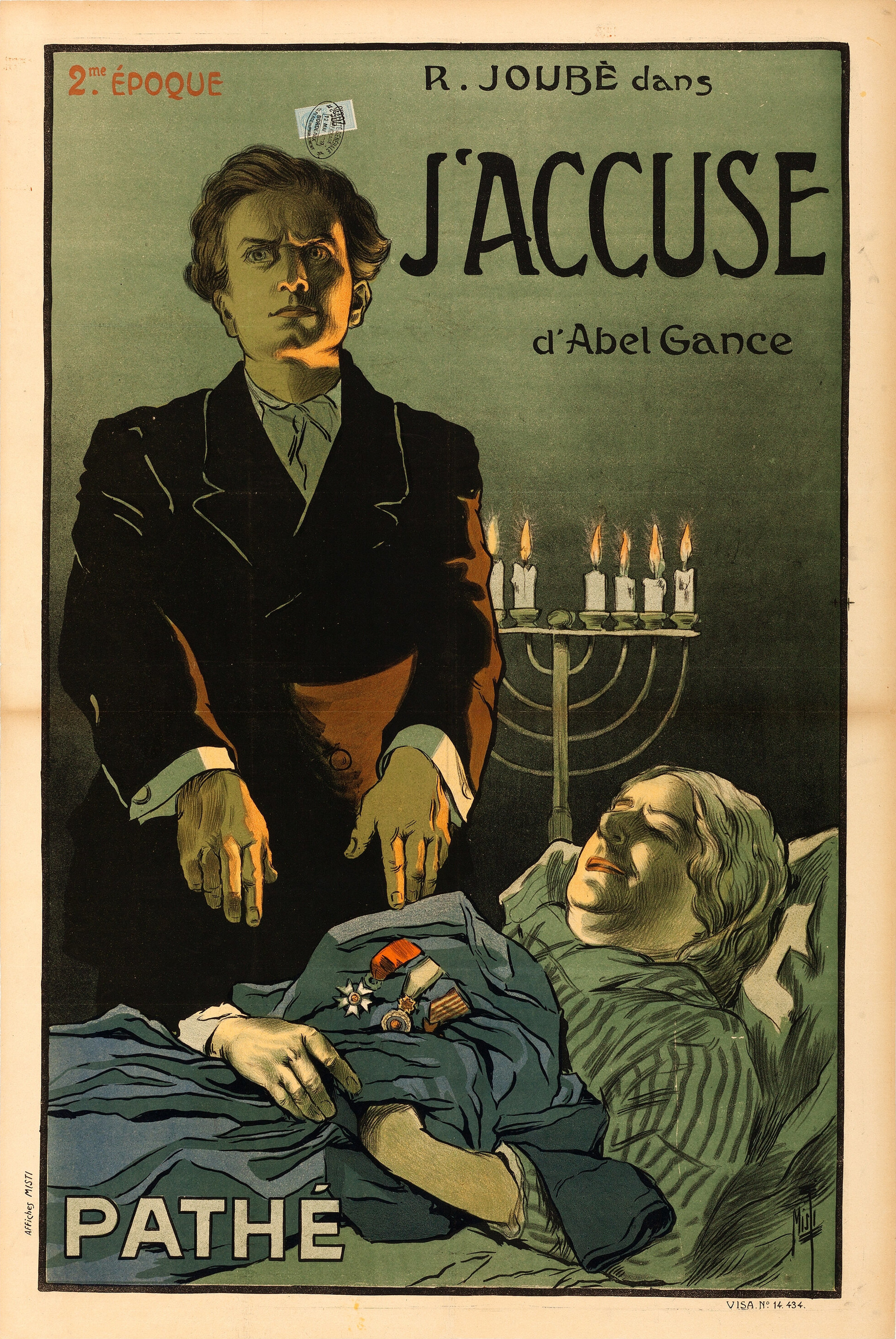
- Theatrical release poster for Part 2
- Directed by: Abel Gance
- Written by: Abel Gance
- Produced by: Charles Pathé
- Starring: Romuald Joubé; Séverin-Mars
- Cinematography: Marc Bujard; Léonce-Henri Burel; Maurice Forster
- Edited by: Andrée Danis; Abel Gance
- Music by: Arthur Honegger
- Distributed by: Pathé Frères
- Release date: 25 April 1919 (France)
- Running time: 166 minutes (2008 restoration)
- Country: France
- Languages: Silent; French intertitles
- Budget: FF525,000

J'accuse is a 1919 French silent film directed by Abel Gance. It juxtaposes a romantic drama with the background of the horrors of World War I, and it is sometimes described as a pacifist or anti-war film. Work on the film began in 1918, and some scenes were filmed on real battlefields. The film's powerful depiction of wartime suffering, particularly its climactic sequence of the "return of the dead", made it an international success and confirmed Gance as one of the most important directors in Europe.

== Plot ==
J'accuse (1919)

In a Provence village, in the south of France, the villagers welcome the declaration of war with Germany in 1914 and flock to enlist. Among them is François Laurin, a man of jealous and violent temperament, who is married to Édith, the daughter of an upright veteran soldier Maria Lazare. François suspects, correctly, that Édith is conducting an affair with the poet Jean Diaz, who lives in the village with his mother. François sends Édith to stay with his parents in Lorraine, where she is subsequently captured and raped by German soldiers. François and Jean find themselves serving in the same battalion at the front, where the initial tensions between them give way to a close friendship that acknowledges that they both love Édith.

In 1918, Jean is discharged through ill health, returns to the village and finds his mother dying. Édith reappears from captivity, now with a young half-German daughter Angèle. Her father, Maria Lazare, immediately leaves to avenge the shame to the family name. When François comes home on leave, Jean and Édith fear his reaction to the illegitimate child and try to conceal her from him, which merely revives his jealous suspicions of Jean, and the two men fight. When the truth is revealed, François and Jean agree to seek their vengeance in battle and return to the front.

In a great battle, in which a mythical figure of Le Gaulois leads on the French forces, François is wounded and dies in the field hospital. Jean, meanwhile, is so shell-shocked that he becomes insane. He returns to the village and gathers the inhabitants together to tell them of his vision on the battlefield: from the graves of the dead, soldiers arise and gather in a great cohort that marches through the land back to their homes. Jean challenges the villagers to say whether they have been worthy of the men's sacrifices, and they watch in horror as their dead family and friends appear on the threshold. The soldiers return to their rest, and Jean goes back to his mother's house. There, he finds a book of his own poems that he tears up in disgust until one of them, his Ode to the Sun, drives him to denounce the sun for its complicity in the crimes of war. As the sunlight fades from the room, Jean dies.

== Cast ==
- Romuald Joubé as the poet Jean Diaz
- Maxime Desjardins as Maria Lazare
- Séverin-Mars as François Laurin
- Angèle Guys as Angèle, Édith's daughter
- Maryse Dauvray as Édith Laurin, the wife of François
- Mancini as Mother Diaz
- Angèle Decori as Marie, Lazare's servant

== Production ==
Abel Gance had been drafted into the French Army's Section Cinématographique during World War I, but he was later discharged because of ill health, a piece of good fortune to which he later said he owed his life. He had already formulated the idea for J'accuse. Influenced by the constant news of the deaths of friends at the front, and also by the recently published book Le Feu by Henri Barbusse, he succeeded in persuading Charles Pathé to finance the film. Filming took place between August 1918 and March 1919. To film the battle scenes, Gance asked to return to the front and was re-enlisted into the Section Cinématographique, with the result that he found himself in September 1918 filming in the Battle of Saint-Mihiel alongside the United States Army. His authentic footage was edited into the final section of the film.

The sequence of the "return of the dead" at the end of the film was shot in the south of France by using 2000 soldiers who had come back on leave. Gance recalled: "The conditions in which we filmed were profoundly moving.... These men had come straight from the Front – from Verdun – and they were due back eight days later. They played the dead knowing that in all probability they'd be dead themselves before long." He then claimed that "within a few weeks of their return, eighty per cent had been killed."

For the film's opening title, a large group of soldiers, filmed from above, is formed up to shape the letters J...A...C...C...U...S...E. In the middle of preparing the shot, a general asked Gance what was happening. Gance stalled until the shot was complete and then explained to the startled general that he was "accusing the war... accusing men... accusing universal stupidity." In the final scenes of the film, Gance's accusations, through the mouth of Jean Diaz, seem to be levelled against those who have not cared enough: the civilians who enjoyed another life, profited from the war, or simply forgot what it meant. The soldiers risen from the dead are said to be content to return to their rest once reassured by the living that their sacrifice has not been in vain. Diaz's final accusation is made against the sun for being a mute witness to so much horror.

Asked whether he regarded J'accuse was a pacifist film, Gance replied: "I'm not interested in politics.... But I am against war, because war is futile. Ten or twenty years afterward, one reflects that millions have died and all for nothing. One has found friends among one's old enemies, and enemies among one's friends." Not all critics however have been convinced of the focus of Gance's argument: "Seemingly critical of a patriotism that blindly ignores the death it causes, J'accuse ends up celebrating the dead's sacrifice as a form of patriotism," Others have noted that J'accuse mixes pacifism with nationalism by pointing to Gance's inspirations, which included not only Henri Barbusse but also Émile Zola and Richard Grelling. While German imperialism was a target of Gance's film, so were ordinary French citizens: "His fiery tirade is directed at those within France who have betrayed the soldiers and their fight for civilization: a terrifying accusation against not only the onscreen audience, but also against Gance's offscreen audience in 1919."

The technical quality of the film was impressive, especially the cinematography of Léonce-Henri Burel with its subtle use of lighting effects and a mobile camera. For the battle scenes in the last section of the film Gance also introduced some of the techniques of rapid editing which he would develop much further in his later films La Roue and Napoléon. Gance's assistant director was the writer Blaise Cendrars, who had lost an arm while fighting in 1915, and who also appeared as one of the dead soldiers rising from the battlefield.

The cost of making the film was 525,000 francs, a considerable sum for the time. By 1923, it was reported to have earned 3,500,000 francs.

== Reception ==
When J'accuse was first shown in France in April 1919, it was a great success with the public, whose mood in the aftermath of the war it seemed to capture. Its acclaim continued when it was shown in London in May 1920 at the Philharmonic Hall with a 40-piece orchestra and a professional choir and without being shown to the British Board of Film Censors. The reviewer in The Times, while finding it "a trifle uneven", noted that familiar incidents of war stories were "set forth with more conviction, and at the same time with more bitterness, than they have ever been before". He was also deeply impressed by the vision of the awakening of the dead from the battlefield and paid it the final tribute that "a film has caused an audience to think". Gance received a telegram from Pathé's London agent saying, "Your name in England is, at present, more famous than Griffith's".

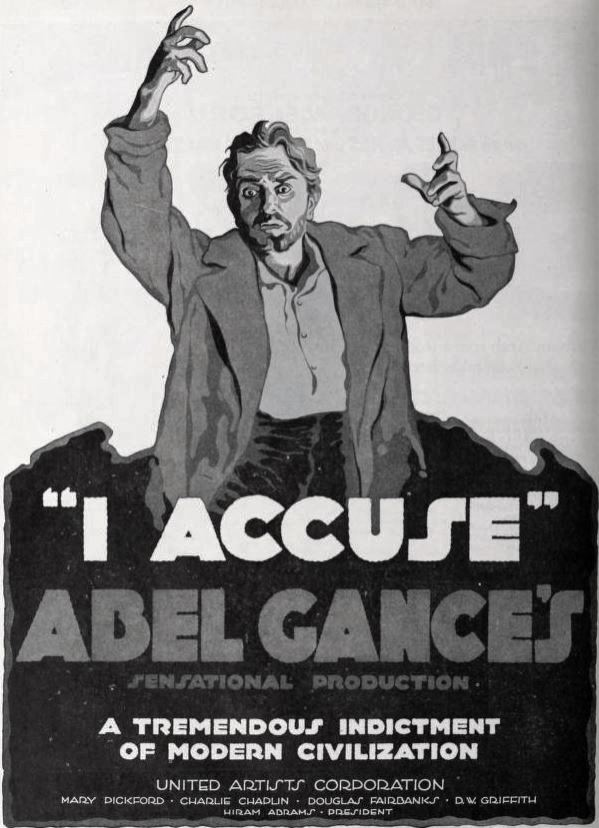
U.S. advertisement

Pathé initially had no success in selling the film for distribution in the United States, where its references to pacifism were unfavourably regarded, and in 1921, Gance went to America hoping to launch it himself. He arranged a gala screening in New York to an audience which included D. W. Griffith and Lillian Gish. Griffith was greatly moved by the film and arranged for its distribution through United Artists.

The author and film critic Leonard Maltin awarded the film three-and-a-half out of a possible four stars and called the film "[a] vividly filmed classic".

The review aggregator website Rotten Tomatoes lists the film having an approval rating of 67% based on 6 reviews, with an average rating of 7.4/10.

== Versions ==
Gance frequently revised and re-edited his films, and several different versions of J'accuse came into existence. It was originally said to be in four episodes (film length 5250 metres), but was then reduced to three episodes (4350 m). It was re-edited into a shorter version entitled I Accuse, released in 1921 and intended for American audiences, with a less universal anti-war slant, a more anti-German stance, and a happy ending. The surviving prints show many other variations.

A new restoration of the film was produced by Lobster Films Studios, Paris, working in collaboration with Nederlands Filmmuseum and Flicker Alley. They culled materials from the Lobster Collection, the Czech Film Archive in Prague, the Cinémathèque Française, and the Nederlands Filmmuseum to make the best possible and most complete edition of the original film (3525 m). This was issued on DVD in 2008.

In 1938, Gance made another version of J'accuse, this time with sound and looking ahead to the imminent outbreak of World War II.

== See also ==
- List of anti-war films
- List of incomplete or partially lost films
- J'Accuse…!
