= The Zone of Death =

1917 film

- Directed by: Abel Gance
- Written by: Abel Gance
- Produced by: Louis Nalpas
- Starring: Andrée Brabant
- Cinematography: Léonce-Henri Burel
- Release date: 12 October 1917
- Country: France
- Languages: Silent; French intertitles

The Zone of Death (French: La Zone de la mort) is a 1917 silent French lost film directed by Abel Gance.

== Cast ==
- Andrée Brabant
- Julien Clément (as Clément)
- Anthony Gildès
- Andrée Lionel
- Léon Mathot
- Gaston Modot
- Georges Paulais
- Paul Vermoyal
