= The Tenth Symphony =

1918 film

The Tenth Symphony (La Dixième Symphonie)
- Screenshots
- Directed by: Abel Gance
- Written by: Abel Gance
- Produced by: Louis Nalpas
- Starring: Séverin-Mars
- Cinematography: Léonce-Henri Burel
- Edited by: Marguerite Beaugé
- Music by: Michel-Maurice Levy
- Release date: 1 November 1918
- Running time: 94 minutes
- Country: France
- Languages: Silent; French intertitles

The Tenth Symphony (French: La Dixième Symphonie) is a 1918 silent French drama film directed by Abel Gance.

== Plot ==
Rich orphan Eve Dinant has fallen under the spell of the charming but evil Fred Rice. She becomes his mistress and he induces her to murder his sister. She rapidly understands that she cannot go on living with such a despicable man and decides to leave him. She gives him money to buy his silence.

A couple of years later, she meets the famous composer Enric Damor and they get married. Enric's daughter, Claire, meets by chance Fred and falls in love with him. With Enric's approval, Fred proposes marriage and comes frequently to visit his fiancée. Eve is determined not to let Fred marry Claire and, as he refuses to listen to her, she tells her husband that the wedding must not take place. Enric does not understand his wife's behaviour and when Fred let him find a letter sent by Claire to him, he asks her whether she is in love with Fred. Rather than confessing her past, Eve tells him that she does love him.

Enric is flabbergasted when he hears about his wife's betrayal, but he sublimates his sufferings to create a masterpiece, his Tenth Symphony, on the theme of Women's betrayal. Fred offers Eve not to marry Claire if she comes back to him. She accepts and he writes a curt breakup letter to his fiancée. Enric is devastated with his wife's absence and Claire goes to Fred's house, determined to take revenge and have Eve come back. She threatens him with a gun but Eve tries to dissuade her from killing him. While they are arguing, Fred draws his own gun and after pointing it at them, turns it against himself and shoots himself. Eve tells Claire how she had shot Fred's sister in the same room. Eve can now go back to Enric, her true love.

== Cast ==
- Séverin-Mars as Composer Enric Damor
- Jean Toulout as Frederic 'Fred' Ryce
- Emmy Lynn as Eve Dinant
- Ariane Hugon as Dancer
- André Lefaur as Marquis de Groix St-Blaise
- Elizabeth Nizan as Claire Damor

== Production ==
This film was produced by the production company Le Film d'Art in 1917. Because of the war, it was only released in November 1918.
