= Louis Nalpas =

French film producer

- Born: 3 November 1884; Smyrna, Ottoman Empire
- Died: 1949 (aged 64–65); Paris, France
- Occupation: Producer

Louis Nalpas (1884–1949) was a Greek-French film producer. He was a leading producer during the silent era, and was employed by the large French studio Pathé.^{:30} He was behind the company's construction of the Victorine Studios in Nice in 1921, which attempted to create a version of Hollywood on the French Riviera.^{:95} He then broke away to form his own production company. He was the elder brother of producer Alex Nalpas.

Nalpas produced many of the early films of director Abel Gance. He was the maternal uncle of Antonin Artaud and was essential in establishing Artaud's career as a film actor.^{:623}

== Selected filmography ==
- Le périscope (1916)
- Les Gaz mortels (1916)
- Le droit à la vie (1917)
- The Torture of Silence (1917)
- Barberousse (1917)
- The Zone of Death (1917)
- The Tenth Symphony (1918)
- La Fête espagnole (1920)
- Mathias Sandorf (1921)
- Vidocq (1923)
- Surcouf (1925)
- The Marriage of Rosine (1926)
- The Chocolate Girl (1927)
- Monte Cristo (1929)
