= Emmy Lynn =

French actress

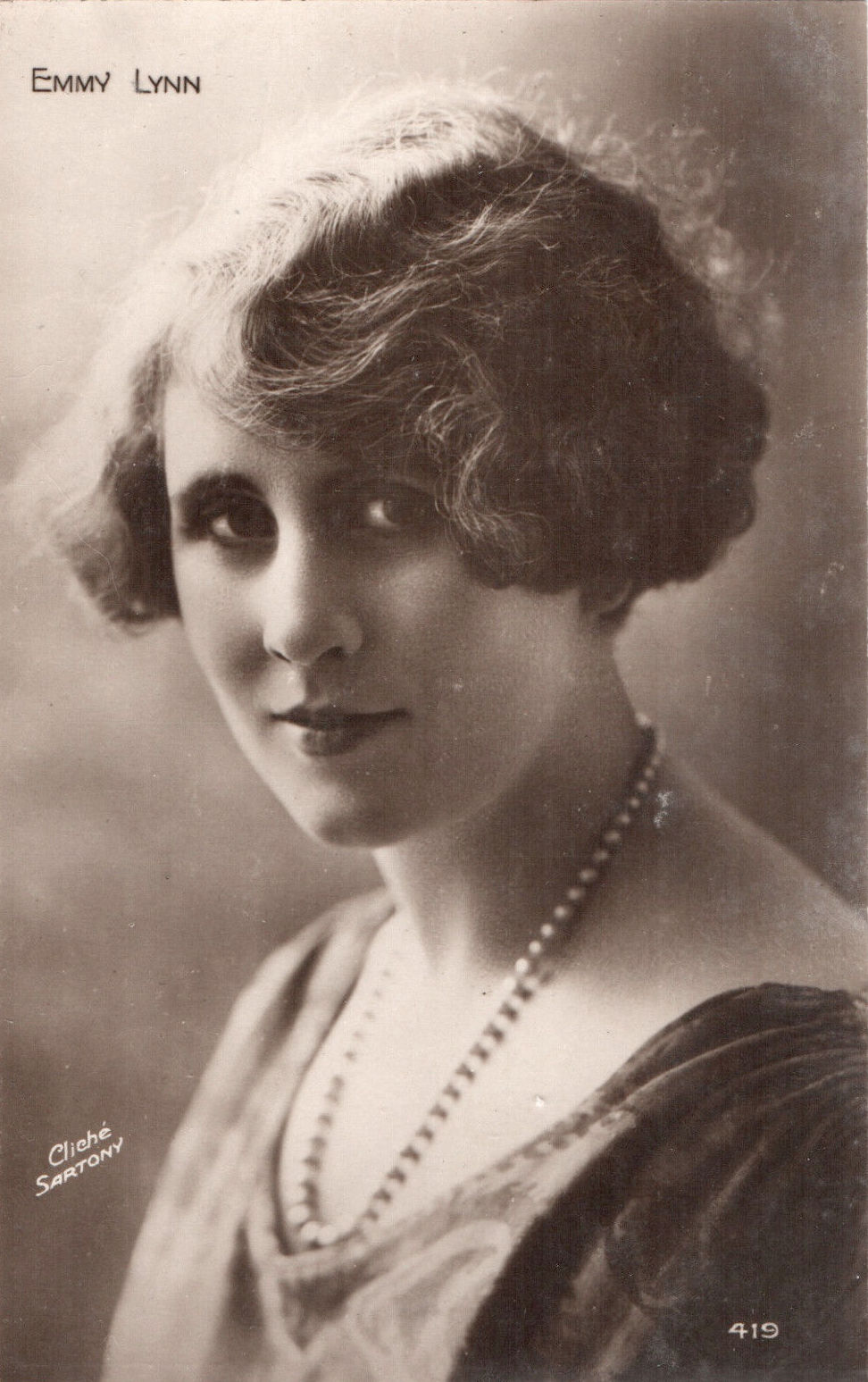
Postcard of Emmy Lynn, 1920

Emmy Lynn (born Emily Leigh; 1889–1978) was a Spanish-born French actress.

Lynn was born Emily Leigh in Barcelona to an English father who worked at the British Consulate and a half-Spanish and half-German mother. She arrived in Paris at the age of one. She was first married to actor Henry Roussel, then to Charles Peignot, and to theatre critic, novelist and essayist Jean-Jacques Gautier.

== Selected filmography ==
- The Cameo (1913)
- The Torture of Silence (1917)
- The Tenth Symphony (1918)
- The Kiddies in the Ruins (1918)
- Le Vertige (1927)
- A Foolish Maiden (1929)
- The Two Orphans (1933)
- Le Lit à colonnes (1942)
