= Culprit (1937 film) =

- French: Le Coupable
- Directed by: Raymond Bernard
- Written by: François Coppée (novel); Bernard Zimmer
- Produced by: Maurice Juven
- Starring: Pierre Blanchar; Gabriel Signoret; Suzet Maïs
- Cinematography: Robert Lefebvre
- Music by: Jacques Ibert
- Production company: Filmor
- Distributed by: Lux Compagnie Cinématographique de France
- Release date: 15 January 1937
- Running time: 107 minutes
- Country: France
- Language: French

Culprit (French: Le Coupable) is a 1937 French drama film directed by Raymond Bernard and starring Pierre Blanchar, Gabriel Signoret and Suzet Maïs. It is a remake of the 1917 silent film Culprit, which was based on a novel by François Coppée.

== Partial cast ==
- Pierre Blanchar as Jérôme Lescuyer
- Gabriel Signoret as Monsieur Lescuyer
- Suzet Maïs as Marie-Louise Gaude
- Junie Astor as Louise Donadieu
- Palmyre Levasseur as Rosalie
- Gilbert Gil as Jérôme Forgeat
- Marcel André as Edouard
- Jean Joffre as Le bâtonnier
- Henri Échourin as Donadieu
- Daniel Clérice as Anatole
- Henri Richard as Le président des assises
- Charles Fallot as Jude Nicolet
- Pierre Finaly as Le ministre
- Albert Gercourt as Lucas
- Albert Malbert as L'agent
- André Dionnet as Le petit Jérôme
- François Rodon as Le petit Anatole
- Madeleine Ozeray as Thérèse Forgeat
- Marguerite Moreno as Mme Gaude

== Bibliography ==
- Dudley Andrew. Mists of Regret: Culture and Sensibility in Classic French Film. Princeton University Press, 1995.
