= Culprit (1917 film) =

- French: Le Coupable
- Directed by: André Antoine
- Based on: Culprit by François Coppée
- Starring: Romuald Joubé; Sylvie; Jacques Grétillat
- Cinematography: Paul Castanet
- Production company: Pathé Frères
- Distributed by: Pathé Frères
- Release date: 5 October 1917
- Country: France
- Language: French

Culprit (French: Le Coupable) is a 1917 French silent drama film directed by André Antoine and starring Romuald Joubé, Sylvie and Jacques Grétillat. It was based on a novel by François Coppée. In 1937, it was remade as a sound film Culprit.

== Plot ==
Chrétien Lescuyer is a prosecuting attorney whose defendant's son commits murder. The son abandons his pregnant mother to fight against a hostile world.

During the hearing, Chrétien Lescuyer talks about his story. Coming from a family of Norman notables and exercising the profession of magistrate from father to son, the young Christian's father sent him to Paris to complete his law studies. One day, François Donnadieu, a sculptor, a childhood friend, invites him to go to his country house, which is in Vaugirard, to spend Sunday there. It was during this visit that Chrétien met Héloïse, Donnadieu's girlfriend and seamstress by profession, as well as the young Perrinette Forgeat, a florist by profession, with whom he fell in love.

== Restoring ==
This film was restored in 1987 by the Cinémathèque Française, with the help of the Musée d'Orsay and the participation of the Kodak Pathé Foundation. The restoration of the film was possible thanks to the loan of a copy held by the Cinematheque of Prague, in the Czech Republic.

== Cast ==
- Romuald Joubé as Chrétien Lescuyer
- Sylvie as Louise Rameau
- Jacques Grétillat as Prosper Aubry
- Léon Bernard as Donadieu, the sculptor
- Séphora Mossé as Perrinette
- Mona Gondré as Chrétien, a child
- René Hiéronimus as Grosse Caisse
- René Rocher as Chrétien Forgeat
