= La Roue =

1923 film by Abel Gance

- theatrical release poster
- Directed by: Abel Gance assisted by Blaise Cendrars
- Written by: Abel Gance
- Produced by: Abel Gance; Charles Pathé
- Starring: Severin-Mars; Ivy Close; Pierre Magnier
- Cinematography: Léonce-Henri Burel; Gaston Brun; Marc Bujard; Albert Duverger
- Edited by: Marguerite Beauge
- Music by: Arthur Honegger; Robert Israel (2008)
- Release date: 17 February 1923
- Running time: 150 minutes (1924 cut); 273 minutes (2008 reconstruction); 413 minutes (2019 restoration)
- Country: France
- Languages: Silent; French intertitles

La Roue (complete 413-minute version of the film)

La Roue (pronounced [la ʁu], 'The Wheel') is a French silent film, directed by Abel Gance, who also directed Napoléon and J'accuse. It was released in 1923. The film used then-revolutionary lighting techniques, and rapid scene changes and cuts.

== Plot ==
Railroad engineer Sisif (Severin-Mars) rescues a small orphan, whose name he learns is Norma (Ivy Close), following a disastrous crash. He raises the little girl as his own, along with his son Elie (Gabriel de Gravone), whose mother died during his birth.

In time, Norma becomes a lively and playful young woman. Her greatest joy is time spent with Elie, by now a handsome violin maker, whom she believes to be her natural brother. But Sisif, to his own horror, finds himself falling in love with his adopted daughter. Sisif confesses to a wealthy colleague, Hersan (Pierre Magnier), Norma's origin and that he is attracted to her. Hersan threatens Sisif with blackmail if he does not consent to give Norma to him in marriage. Norma herself is reluctant but is moved by the prospect of greater prosperity. Sisif reluctantly agrees to the marriage, and himself drives the train that will deliver Norma to her husband. Distraught, he drives recklessly, and nearly wrecks the train. After some months of marriage, Norma writes to say that it is unhappy. Elie discovers the truth about Norma's origin and reproaches his father for keeping it secret, thereby preventing Elie from marrying her before she married Hersan.

An eye injury forces Sisif to abandon the mainline railways, and he goes to work instead on the funicular at Mont Blanc. When Norma comes to vacation at Chamonix with her husband, she learns where Sisif and Elie live. Hersan finds out that Elie is also in love with Norma when he smashes a violin that was made by Elie. Inside is a love letter that only Hersan reads. A jealous Hersan fights with Elie on the edge of a precipice. Elie shoots Hersan in self-defense, and afterward falls to his death. Sisif, enraged by Elie's death, blames Norma and drives her from him. Without Hersan, Norma is left penniless, while Sisif's failing sight means that he loses his job. Norma goes to live with him without his permission and manages to stay undetected in his shack for a time. When he at last realizes she is there, they cling to one another, time and tragedy having restored the balance in their father-daughter relationship.

Sisif grows old, cared for by Norma. After sending her out to join in a local festivity, Sisif waits at the window, watching not with his eyes but with his mind. As Norma dances, Sisif dies.

== Cast ==
- Séverin-Mars as Sisif
- Ivy Close as Norma
- Gabriel de Gravone as Elie
- Pierre Magnier as Jacques de Hersan
- Max Maxudian as Le minéralogiste Kalatikascopoulos
- Georges Térof as Machefer
- Gil Clary as Dalilah

== Reception ==
The film has an 80% score on Rotten Tomatoes, with 5 collected ratings.

== Preservation status ==
The original version encompassed 32 reels, which ran for either seven and a half or nine hours (sources disagree). In 1924, Gance edited it down to two and a half hours for general distribution. A modern reconstruction from five different versions, available on DVD, is nearly four and a half hours long. An almost seven hours long restored version was shown at the 2019 Lumière Film Festival. Janus Films released the restoration in the United States at the 2023 New York Film Festival.

== See also ==
- List of incomplete or partially lost films
- List of longest films
