= Le Miracle des loups =

Le Miracle des loups (English: The Miracle of the wolves) is the title of two French adventure historical films, both located at the time of rivalry between Louis XI and Charles the Bold. In both films numerous scenes were filmed at the Cité de Carcassonne.

- The first was directed in 1924 by Raymond Bernard
- The second was directed in 1961 by André Hunebelle

It is also the title of a novel of Henry Dupuy-Mazuel, with prefaces of Henry Bordeaux and Camille Jullian, published by Albin Michel in 1924.
