= Montmartre (disambiguation) =

Montmartre is a large hill in Paris, France.

Montmartre may also refer to:

- Montmartre (duo), an electronic music duo from Paris, France
- Rural Municipality of Montmartre No. 126, a rural municipality
  - Montmartre, Saskatchewan, a village in Saskatchewan, Canada
- Montmartre (Van Gogh series)
- Café Montmartre, a defunct restaurant in Hollywood, California
- Jazzhus Montmartre, a jazz club in Copenhagen, Denmark
- Montmartre, the United States title for the 1923 German drama film Die Flamme
- Montmartre (1925 film), a 1925 French silent film
- Montmartre (1931 film), a 1931 French drama film
- Montmartre (1941 film), a 1941 French romantic comedy film
- Montmartre (horse)
- "Montmartre", a song by Irving Berlin

== See also ==
- Live at Montmartre (disambiguation)
