= Charles Vanel =

French actor and director (1892–1989)

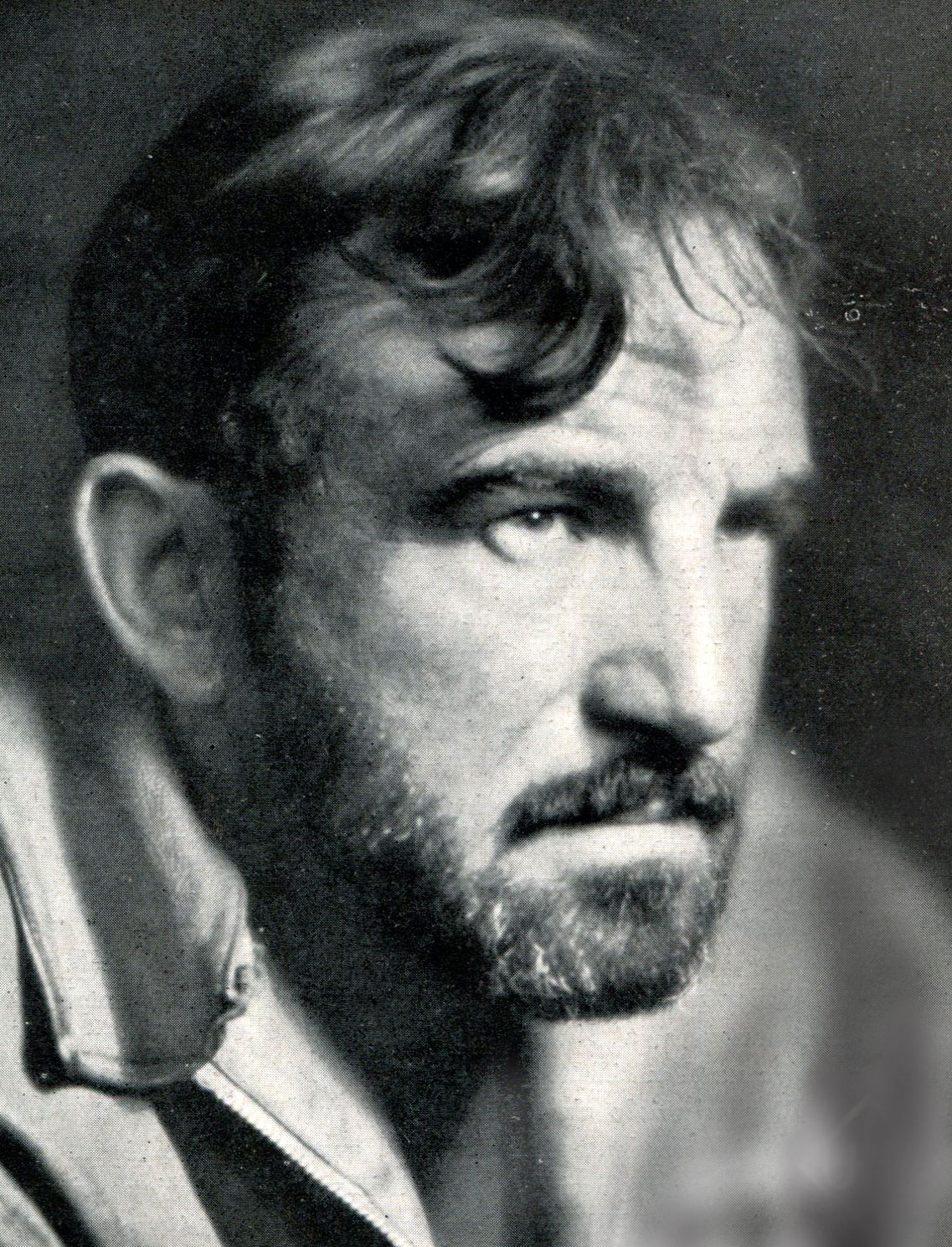
- Vanel in 1934
- Born: Charles-Marie Vanel; 21 August 1892; Rennes, France
- Died: 15 April 1989 (aged 96); Cannes, France
- Occupations: Actor; Film director
- Years active: 1923–1988

Charles-Marie Vanel (21 August 1892 – 15 April 1989) was a French actor and director. During his 65-year film career, which began in 1923, he appeared in more than 200 films and worked with many prominent directors, including Alfred Hitchcock, Luis Buñuel, Jacques Feyder, and Henri-Georges Clouzot. He is perhaps best remembered for his role as a desperate truck driver in Clouzot's The Wages of Fear, for which he received a Special Mention at the Cannes Film Festival in 1953.

== Biography ==
=== Early life ===
Charles-Marie Vanel was born in Rennes in Brittany. He came from a seafaring family and his parents were traders who moved to Paris when he was twelve years old. He was expelled from all the schools he attended. He tried to enlist in the navy, but was rejected due to his poor eyesight. In 1908, he began to perform in the theater, appearing in Hamlet. His first film was the 1912 Jim Crow directed by Robert Péguy.

He was mobilized for the First World War in July 1915, but was diagnosed in September with "mental disorders" and sent home. During the war, he took numerous theatrical tours, notably a tour to the US under the direction of Lucien Guitry. He became a member of the Firmin Gémier theatre company at the Théâtre Antoine, before devoting himself exclusively to cinema. His first major contract was with Russian producers Joseph Ermolieff and Alexandre Kamenka, who taught him using Stanislavski's system.

=== Film career ===
He began a successful career as an actor, appearing in numerous silent films in the 1910s and 1920s, particularly in the roles of gruff and bitter characters. He considered his "real" film debut to be in Robert Boudrioz's Tillers of the Soil, which was produced by Abel Gance in 1919 but held up for release. He also appeared in Alexandre Volkoff's 10-part serial film The House of Mystery (1923) which pleased audiences and critics.

He appeared in six films directed by Jacques de Baroncelli, including Pêcheur d'Islande (1924), based on the novel by Pierre Loti, which was one of the most popular French films of the decade and showed Vanel's greater range and depth. Others for de Baroncelli included maritime dramas Nitchevo (1926) and Feu! (1927).

With the advent of sound films, his voice, and the inflections he gave, consolidated his popularity as a character actor with a wide range of colorful roles. At the beginning of the 1930s he signed a contract with Pathé-Natan and stood out in three films by Raymond Bernard, Pathé's lead director – Montmartre (1931) as a pimp; Wooden Crosses (1932) as World War I infantryman; and as Javert alongside Harry Baur in Les Misérables (1933).

He was also directed by Maurice Tourneur in Accused, Stand Up! (1930) and Dance Hall (1931), both of which also featured Gaby Morlay. He appeared as a barkeeper in Le Grand Jeu (1934) directed by Jacques Feyder and as an airman in Anatole Litvak's L'Équipage (1935).

The poetic realism film movement in France in the mid to late 1930s saw him appear in Marcel Carné's debut film Jenny (1936) and in Julien Duvivier's Popular Front drama La Belle Équipe in which he was Jean Gabin's friend and romantic rival. The following year, he appeared opposite Erich von Stroheim in The Rail Pirates directed by Christian-Jaque and, in 1938, opposite Jules Berry in Crossroads by Kurt Bernhardt. In 1939, he appeared as a Canadian Mountie hunting Michèle Morgan and Pierre Richard-Willm in La Loi du nord.

In Occupied France, he never stopped working but his credits were fewer. He appeared with Fernandel in The Marvelous Night directed by Jean-Paul Paulin. One of his best films and roles was in Jean Grémillon's The Woman Who Dared starring alongside Madeleine Renaud. Another was Les affaires sont les affaires (1942) by Jean Dréville.

At the Liberation of France in 1944, he was worried by the French Resistance. He explained that his support for Marshal Pétain was because of his memories as a veteran of the First World War. Vanel denounced the excesses of Vichy France, and above all, being a patriot, did not endorse collaboration with the Germans.

After the war, his career slumped and was no longer considered bankable. From 1948, he toured extensively in Italy and appeared in many Italian films, including In the Name of the Law (1949) by Pietro Germi.

=== The Wages of Fear ===
Henri-Georges Clouzot helped get him back on track, choosing him to co-star in The Wages of Fear (1953) where he played a tough truck driver who gradually reveals his inner fragility. Vanel won an award for best actor at the Cannes Film Festival.

Vanel was again directed by Clouzot two years later in Les Diaboliques and in The Truth (1960). He also appeared as a prosecutor in L'Affaire Maurizius (1954) by Julien Duvivier and in Sacha Guitry's Royal Affairs in Versailles (1954). He won best actor at the Karlovy Vary International Film Festival for L'Affaire Maurizius.

In his only Hollywood production, shot on the French Riviera, he played Bertani, a restaurant owner and friend of the character played by Cary Grant in Alfred Hitchcock's 1955 film, To Catch a Thief. In 1956, in Death in the Garden by Luis Buñuel, he appeared alongside Simone Signoret. He was Best Actor at the 1957 San Sebastián International Film Festival for Le feu aux poudres.

=== Television ===
The growth of French television gave him new opportunities and in 1972, he triumphed as a patriarch in Les Thibault, an adaptation of the novel by Roger Martin du Gard.

He remained very active during this decade, in particular in the role of a judge in The Most Wonderful Evening of My Life directed by Ettore Scola. A special tribute was given to him at the 1970 Cannes Film Festival. He received a nomination for Best Actor at the César Awards for 7 morts sur ordonnance in 1975 and in 1979, he received an honorary César Award for his career

Francesco Rosi directed him in some of his best later performances in Illustrious Corpses (1976) and Three Brothers (1981) where, almost in his nineties, he plays the character of an old farmer from Apulia, who is visited by his three children. In Italy he won the David di Donatello for best actor in a supporting role.

In 1986, he recorded the song "La vie rien ne va est la" with Mireille Mathieu.

His last film appearance was in Jean-Pierre Mocky's film Les Saisons du plaisir in 1988.

=== Directing ===
Vanel directed his only feature film in 1929, Dans la nuit. In 1931, he shot another short film, Affaire Classé with Pierre Larquey and Gabriel Gabrio, released in 1935 under the title Le Coup de minuit.

In 2002, at the request of filmmaker Bertrand Tavernier, Louis Sclavis composed and recorded music for Dans la nuit.

=== Death ===
Vanel retired to Mouans-Sartoux in Provence-Alpes-Côte d'Azur, near Cannes, where he lived with Arlette Bailly (1928–2015), his third wife, 36 years his junior. He was hospitalized in Cannes on the night of Friday, 14 April 1989 and died in the early hours of the morning the following day. Part of his ashes were scattered off the coast of Menton, the rest were placed in the cemetery of Mougins or Mouans-Sartoux.

=== Awards ===
- 1953: Cannes International Film Festival – Special Mention – The Wages of Fear
- 1954: Karlovy Vary International Film Festival – Best Actor – L'Affaire Maurizius
- 1957: San Sebastian International Film Festival – Best Actor – Le feu aux poudres
- 1979: Honorary César Award for his career
- 1981: David Di Donatello Award – Best Supporting Actor – Three Brothers

== Selected filmography ==
| Year | Film | Role | Director | Notes |
|---|---|---|---|---|
| 1916 | Jim Crow | | | |
| 1917 | La p'tite du sixième | | | |
| 1920 | Miarka | Mario, le garde-chasse | Louis Mercanton | |
| 1921 | Crépuscule d'épouvante | Guillaume Brohan | | |
| 1921 | La fille de Camargue | | | |
| 1922 | Possession | Dimitri | Louis Mercanton | |
| 1922 | Tempêtes | Raoul Mauduit | | |
| 1923 | Tillers of the Soil | Bernard Larade | Robert Boudrioz | |
| 1923 | The House of Mystery | Henri Corradin | Alexandre Volkoff | |
| 1923 | Calvaire d'amour | Georges Brémond | | |
| 1923 | L'autre aile | Gaston Lager | | |
| 1923 | Du crépuscule à l'aube | | | |
| 1924 | In the Spider's Web | Stephen Powers | | |
| 1924 | La mendiante de Saint-Sulpice | Gilbert Rollin | | |
| 1924 | La Flambée des rêves | Lucien Réneval | | |
| 1924 | Le vol | Favier | | |
| 1924 | Heart of an Actress | | Germaine Dulac | |
| 1924 | Pêcheur d'Islande | Jan | | |
| 1925 | Le réveil | Le Prince Jean | | |
| 1925 | Barocco | Barocco | Charles Burguet | |
| 1926 | L'Orphelin du Cirque | Garment, le traitre / Legru | | |
| 1926 | The Flame | Boussat | René Hervil | |
| 1926 | 600,000 Francs a Month | Jean Durand | Robert Péguy | |
| 1926 | La Nuit de la revanche | | | |
| 1926 | Nitchevo | Captain Cartier | Jacques de Baroncelli | |
| 1927 | Charité | | | |
| 1927 | The Prey of the Wind | Pierre Vignal | René Clair | |
| 1927 | Feu! | Le lieutenant Frémiet | | |
| 1927 | Queen Louise | Napoleon | Karl Grune | |
| 1927 | The White Slave | Dr. Warner | Augusto Genina | |
| 1927 | Martyr | | Charles Burguet | |
| 1927 | Die Apachen von Paris | Bécot | | |
| 1928 | Da hält die Welt den Atem an | | | |
| 1928 | The Crew | | Maurice Tourneur | |
| 1928 | Da hält die Welt den Atem an | | | |
| 1928 | The Passenger | | Jacques de Baroncelli | |
| 1929 | Waterloo | Napoleon | Karl Grune | |
| 1929 | Drei Tage auf Leben und Tod – aus dem Logbuch der U.C.1 | Der Steuermann | | |
| 1929 | The Love of the Brothers Rott | | Erich Waschneck | |
| 1929 | An Ideal Woman | | Jean Durand | |
| 1929 | Les Fourchambault | | | |
| 1930 | Chiqué | Francois | | |
| 1930 | Dans la nuit | L'ouvrier carrier | | |
| 1930 | Accused, Stand Up! | Henri Lapalle | Maurice Tourneur | |
| 1930 | L'Arlésienne | Mitifio, un gardian | | |
| 1930 | Le capitaine jaune | Le capitaine | | |
| 1931 | Dance Hall | Ramon | Maurice Tourneur | |
| 1931 | The Yellow House of Rio | King-Fu / Scalpa | | |
| 1931 | Montmartre | André Marco, dit Dédé | Raymond Bernard | |
| 1932 | Wooden Crosses | Caporal Breval | Raymond Bernard | |
| 1932 | In the Name of the Law | Lancelot | Maurice Tourneur | |
| 1932 | Dainah the Mulatto | Le mécanicien Michaux | | |
| 1932 | Gitanes | Léon | | |
| 1934 | Les Misérables | Inspecteur Javert | Raymond Bernard | |
| 1934 | At the End of the World | Georges Laudy | | |
| 1934 | Le Grand Jeu | Clément | Jacques Feyder | |
| 1935 | King of the Camargue | Rampal | | |
| 1935 | The Crew | Le lieutenant Maury | | |
| 1935 | The Green Domino | Nebel – un sculpteur | | |
| 1935 | L'impossible aveu | Fred | | |
| 1936 | The Volga Boatman | Le colonel Goreff | Vladimir Strizhevsky | |
| 1936 | Michel Strogoff | Ivan Ogareff | Richard Eichberg | |
| 1936 | La Peur | Robert Sylvain | | |
| 1936 | The Flame | Victor Boussat | André Berthomieu | |
| 1936 | They Were Five | Charles Billot aka Charlot | Julien Duvivier | |
| 1936 | Jenny | Benoit | Marcel Carné | |
| 1936 | Les Grands | Henri Lormier | | |
| 1936 | Port Arthur | Commander Vassidloff | | |
| 1936 | The Assault | Alexandre Mérital | Pierre-Jean Ducis | |
| 1937 | Southern Mail | L'ambassadeur Herlin | Pierre Billon | |
| 1937 | Police mondaine | Salviati | | |
| 1937 | Troïka sur la piste blanche | Michel Steinberg | | |
| 1937 | Abused Confidence | Jacques Ferney | Henri Decoin | |
| 1938 | Rail Pirates | Henri Pierson | | |
| 1938 | The Woman from the End of the World | Durc, l'officier mécanicien | | |
| 1938 | The West | Jean Cadière | Henri Fescourt | |
| 1938 | Légions d'honneur | Captaine Dabrau | | |
| 1938 | Bar du sud | Le capitaine Olivier | | |
| 1938 | S.O.S. Sahara | Loup | Jacques de Baroncelli | |
| 1938 | Crossroads | Roger de Vétheuil | Curtis Bernhardt | |
| 1939 | Savage Brigade | Général Kalitjeff | Marcel L'Herbier | |
| 1939 | Yamilé sous les cèdres | le chef maronite Rachid el Hamé | | |
| 1939 | La Loi du Nord | Le caporal Dalrymple | Jacques Feyder | |
| 1940 | Cristobal's Gold | Le Coronel – le chef de la police | Jacques Becker | |
| 1940 | The Marvelous Night | Le fermier | Jean-Paul Paulin | |
| 1941 | The Black Diamond | François Mitry | Jean Delannoy | |
| 1942 | Business Is Business | Isidore Lechat | | |
| 1942 | Promise to a Stranger | Bernard Parker | | |
| 1942 | Haut-le-Vent | François Ascarra | | |
| 1943 | Le soleil a toujours raison | L'homme du mas | | |
| 1943 | Les Roquevillard | Maître François Roquevillard | | |
| 1944 | The Woman Who Dared | Pierre Gauthier | Jean Grémillon | |
| 1945 | Hanged Man's Farm | François | | |
| 1946 | Gringalet | Ravaut | André Berthomieu | |
| 1946 | Le Bateau à soupe | Le capitaine Hervé | | |
| 1947 | La Cabane aux souvenirs | Lauragais | | |
| 1947 | Woman of Evil | Laurent | | |
| 1948 | The Woman I Murdered | François Bachelin | Jacques Daniel-Norman | |
| 1949 | In the Name of the Law | Massaro Turi Passalacqua | Pietro Germi | |
| 1949 | Vertigine d'amore | Mugnaio Resplanton / France: Emile Resplandin | | |
| 1950 | The Fighting Men | Don Salvatore Sparaino | Roberto Savarese | |
| 1950 | Hearts at Sea | Nostromo Norus | Giorgio Bianchi | |
| 1951 | The Crossroads | Lubiani | Fernando Cerchio | |
| 1951 | Tragic Spell | Bastiano | Mario Sequi | |
| 1951 | The Last Sentence | Giudice Marco Valsetti | Mario Bonnard | |
| 1952 | Malaire | Noguère aîné | | |
| 1953 | The Wages of Fear | M. Jo | Henri-Georges Clouzot | |
| 1954 | Royal Affairs in Versailles | Monsieur de Vergennes | Sacha Guitry | |
| 1954 | Maddalena | Giovanni Lamberti | | |
| 1954 | On Trial | Wolf Andergast | | |
| 1954 | The Cheerful Squadron | Il capitano Hurluret | Paolo Moffa | |
| 1955 | Les Diaboliques | Alfred Fichet, le commissaire | Henri-Georges Clouzot | |
| 1955 | To Catch a Thief | Bertani | Alfred Hitchcock | |
| 1955 | Tom Toms of Mayumba | Carlo Leonardi | Folco Quilici | |
| 1955 | A Missionary | Père Gauthier | Maurice Cloche | |
| 1955 | Sunset in Naples | | Guido Brignone | |
| 1956 | Difendo il mio amore | Verdisio | Giulio Macchi | |
| 1956 | Death in the Garden | Castin | Luis Buñuel | |
| 1957 | Burning Fuse | Albatrasse | Henri Decoin | |
| 1957 | The Suspects | Commissaire Perrache | | |
| 1958 | Rafles sur la ville | Léonce Pozzi, dit "Le Fondu" | | |
| 1958 | Le Piège | Caillé | | |
| 1958 | The Mask of the Gorilla | Colonel Berthomieu | Bernard Borderie | |
| 1959 | Les Naufrageurs | Marnez | | |
| 1959 | Prisoner of the Volga | Ossip Semjonowitsch | Victor Tourjansky | |
| 1959 | La Valse du Gorille | Berthomieu dit 'Le Vieux' | | |
| 1959 | Island Fishermen | L'armateur Mével | | |
| 1960 | The Truth | Maître Guérin | Henri-Georges Clouzot | |
| 1960 | Maria, Registered in Bilbao | El viejo | Ladislao Vajda | |
| 1961 | Tintin and the Golden Fleece | Père Alexandre | Jean-Jacques Vierne | |
| 1962 | The Steppe | Pére Christophore | Alberto Lattuada | |
| 1962 | Lo sgarro | | | |
| 1963 | Rififi in Tokyo | Van Hekken | Jacques Deray | |
| 1963 | Symphonie pour un massacre | Paoli | | |
| 1963 | A King Without Distraction | Le procureur du Roi | François Leterrier | |
| 1963 | Magnet of Doom | Dieudonné Ferchaux | Jean-Pierre Melville | |
| 1965 | Le Chant du monde | Marinau, le matelot | Marcel Camus | |
| 1967 | Shock Troops | Passevin | Costa-Gavras | |
| 1968 | La prisonnière | L'invité au vernissage qui dit 'Oui, ça correspond au schéma du bonhomme' (uncredited) | Henri-Georges Clouzot | |
| 1969 | Ballade pour un chien | Viachet | | |
| 1970 | Sébastien et la Mary-Morgane | Louis Maréchal | Cécile Aubry | |
| 1970 | Ils | Le professeur Swaine | | |
| 1971 | Comptes à rebours | Juliani | | |
| 1972 | La nuit bulgare | Bohringer | | |
| 1972 | Gang War in Naples | Don Mimo De Ritis | Pasquale Squitieri | |
| 1972 | The Most Wonderful Evening of My Life | Il Presidente, Giudice Dutz | Ettore Scola | |
| 1974 | Par le sang des autres | Le curé | | |
| 1975 | 7 morts sur ordonnance | Old Brézé | Jacques Rouffio | |
| 1975 | Calm Prevails Over the Country | Grandfather Parra | | |
| 1976 | Illustrious Corpses | Procurator Varga | Francesco Rosi | |
| 1976 | Boomerang | Me Ritter | José Giovanni | |
| 1976 | Golden Night | Charles Fournier | Serge Moati | |
| 1976 | À l'ombre d'un été | Jean Landot | | |
| 1977 | Alice or the Last Escapade | Henri Vergennes | Claude Chabrol | |
| 1978 | Ne pleure pas | Le grand-père | | |
| 1980 | Le chemin perdu | Léon Schwarz | | |
| 1981 | La Puce et le Privé | Mathieu Fortier | | |
| 1981 | Three Brothers | Donato Giuranna | Francesco Rosi | |
| 1987 | Si le soleil ne revenait pas | Anzevui | Claude Goretta | |
| 1988 | Les Saisons du plaisir | Charles Van Bergh (final film role) | | |
