= Les Misérables (1934 film) =

French film

- Theatrical release poster
- Directed by: Raymond Bernard
- Written by: Raymond Bernard; André Lang
- Based on: Les Misérables; 1862 novel by Victor Hugo
- Produced by: Raymond Borderie; Bernard Natan
- Starring: Harry Baur; Charles Vanel; Josseline Gaël
- Cinematography: Jules Kruger
- Music by: Arthur Honegger
- Production company: Pathé-Natan
- Distributed by: Pathé-Natan
- Release date: 9 February 1934
- Running time: 289 minutes
- Country: France
- Language: French

Les Misérables is a 1934 French film adaptation of Victor Hugo's 1862 novel of the same name. Scripted and directed by Raymond Bernard, it stars Harry Baur as Jean Valjean, Charles Vanel as Javert, and Josseline Gaël as Cosette. Initially released as three films that premiered over three consecutive weeks, Une tempête sous un crâne (Tempest in a Skull), Les Thénardier (The Thenardiers), and Liberté, liberté chérie (Freedom, dear Freedom), the full, unedited film clocks in at 281 minutes.

It is considered by critics to be the greatest adaptation of the novel, due to its in-depth development of the themes and characters, in comparison with most shorter adaptations. Although produced by Pathé, filming took place on a specially constructed set in Biot, Alpes-Maritimes as well as the nearby Victorine Studios in Nice, as opposed to the company's Joinville Studios in Paris. Sets were designed by Lucien Carré and Jean Perrier, with music by eminent Swiss composer Arthur Honegger.

The film is produced by the French studio Pathé, which is the second oldest production in the world.

== Plot ==
Jean Valjean is an ex-convict struggling to redeem himself, but his attempts are continually ruined by the intrusion of Javert. Javert is a cruel, ruthless police inspector who has dedicated his life to pursuing Valjean, whose only crime was stealing a loaf of bread, for which he received 5 years in jail. He serves an additional 14 years for escape attempts.

The film, like the novel, features numerous other characters and subplots, such as Fantine, a woman forced into prostitution to pay two cruel innkeepers, the Thénardiers, for looking after her daughter Cosette, and the story of the revolutionaries, including Marius Pontmercy, a young man who falls in love later on in the film with the now-adult Cosette.

== Cast ==
- Harry Baur as Jean Valjean & Champmathieu
- Charles Vanel as Javert
- Florelle as Fantine
- Josseline Gaël as Cosette
- Gaby Triquet as Cosette (child)
- Jean Servais as Marius
- Orane Demazis as Éponine
- Gilberte Savary as Éponine (child)
- Lucien Nat as Montparnasse
- Charles Dullin as Thénardier
- Marguerite Moreno as Madame Thénardier
- Émile Genevois as Gavroche
- Robert Vidalin as Enjolras
- Henry Krauss as Monseigneur Myriel
- Denise Mellot as Azelma
- Jacqueline Fermez as Azelma (child)
- Cailloux as Mabeuf
- Ginette d'Yd as Sister Simplice
- Pierre Piérade as Bamatabois
- Charlotte Barbier-Krauss as Toussaint
- Roland Armontel as Félix Tholomyès

== Differences from the novel ==
The film is, for the most part, faithful to the original novel, however, there are some differences:

- Javert is presented as considerably less sympathetic than in the book, largely portraying him as the pinnacle of the cruelty in 19th century France.
- Valjean is released after having saved a house from caving in, not because his time is served.
- Not Fantine's last, but her first evening with Tholomyès is shown.
- Valjean's re-arrest after his escape from Montreuil's prison and escape from the "Orion" are omitted.
- Valjean and Cosette's stay at the Gorbeau House, their dodging of Javert and their arrival at the Petit-Picpus convent are omitted. After they leave the Thénardiers, the film jumps to Cosette's sixteenth birthday.
- Cosette and Marius are already lovers before the attack on Valjean in the Gorbeau House.
- Marius is already acquainted with Éponine and Gavroche before the attack at Gorbeau House.
- When Marius notifies Javert of the Thénardiers' plans, he is also able to give Javert Valjean's address, at least one of them. Javert comes to this address after the robbery and recognises Valjean there. Valjean has to flee to his other house, where he finds Marius and Cosette. After Marius reveals what he has done, expecting gratitude, Valjean sends him away. Only Cosette's pleas make him change his mind, but only after Marius left.
- Valjean does not meet Thénardier in the sewers.
- Valjean presents himself to Gillenormand when taking Marius home. Gillenormand, Marius and Cosette have therefore always known the identity of Marius' saviour.
- Valjean dies shortly after his confession to Marius, the day after the wedding, due to a wound which appeared to have become infected (probably due to the sewer water). He does not describe Fantine to Cosette.

== Critical reaction ==
The film has been referred to as "the most complete and well rounded adaptation of Victor Hugo's classic novel".

A contemporary review in The Spectator was exceptionally positive, calling the film "the best French picture seen here for many months." In particular, it praised Harry Baur's "remarkable performance" and lauded the film for managing to distill such a lengthy novel into its key components without coming across as disjointed.

Raymond Bernard's version of Les Misérables, along with various other films about 18th and 19th century France, supported an exhibition of French drawings held in 2010 at the Art Gallery of New South Wales in Sydney, Australia. The exhibition was entitled David to Cézanne: master drawings from the Prat Collection, Paris and ran from 22 September until 5 December 2010. The film was screened 30 October, 3 November and 7 November in the Gallery's Domain Theatre.

== Restoration and home video ==
The Criterion Collection released a restored version of Les Misérables in its Eclipse DVD line. The three parts appeared alongside Bernard's Wooden Crosses (1932) in the Eclipse Series 4: Raymond Bernard collection (2007). This version, totalling 281 minutes (109:52, 85:21 and 86:36), is shorter than the reported 305 minute total runtime of the original release, though it is possible that time may be inaccurate or include brief intermissions no longer present. Criterion's liner notes describe how the film was reissued at varying lengths over the following decades and was only restored to its approximate original length shortly before Bernard's death, minus some scenes that could not be recovered.

In 2013, Pathé carried out a new restoration of the film, totaling 289 minutes (115:39, 85:45 and 87:23), and released it on Blu-ray and DVD. Eureka Entertainment also released this version on Blu-ray and DVD in 2014, as part of its Masters of Cinema line.

== See also ==
- Adaptations of Les Misérables
- List of longest films by running time
