= The Mysteries of Paris (1922 film) =

1922 film

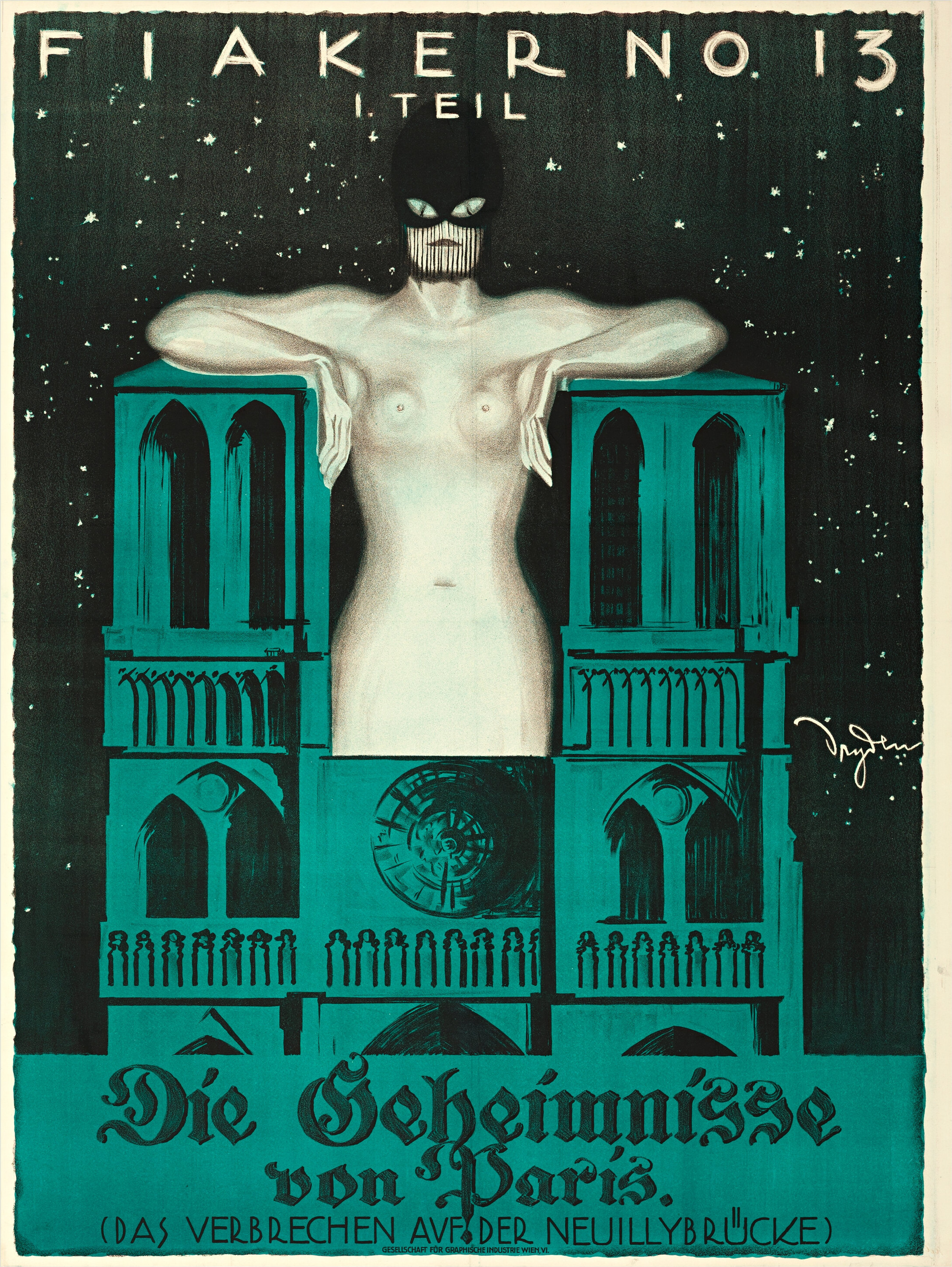
- Austrian theatrical release poster
- Directed by: Charles Burguet
- Written by: André-Paul Antoine; Charles Burguet; Eugène Sue (novel)
- Starring: Huguette Duflos; Georges Lannes
- Cinematography: Albert Cohendy; Georges Raulet
- Production company: Phocea Film
- Release date: 6 October 1922
- Country: France
- Languages: Silent; French intertitles

The Mysteries of Paris (French: Les mystères de Paris) is a 1922 French silent serial film drama directed by Charles Burguet and starring Huguette Duflos and Georges Lannes.

It is based on the novel The Mysteries of Paris by Eugène Sue. The serial ran in twelve installments.

== Cast ==
- Huguette Duflos as Fleur-de-Marie
- Georges Lannes as Le prince Rodolphe
- Andrée Lionel as Sarah MacGrégor
- Camille Bardou as Le Chourineur
- Suzanne Bianchetti as La marquise d'Harville
- Paul Vermoyal as Maître Ferrand, le notaire
- Gilbert Dalleu as Le Maître d'école
- Jeanne Bérangère as La Chouette
- Gaston Modot as Martial
- Yvonne Sergyl as Louise Morel
- Paul Guidé as Le marquis d'Harville
- Pierre Fresnay as François Germain
- Madeleine Guitty as La Goualeuse
- Berthe Jalabert as Madame Séraphin
- Charles Lamy as Monsieur Pipelet
- Sarah Duhamel as Madame Pipelet
- Desdemona Mazza as Cecily
- Simone Vaudry as Claire Dubreuil
- Pierrette Caillol as Rigolette
- Rachel Bérendt as La Louve
- Ernest Maupain as Walter Murph
- René Blancard as Bras-Rouge
- G. A. Martin as Tortillard
- Pillot as Tom Seyton
- Carlo Liten as Morel
- Régine Dumien as Fleur-de-Marie enfant
- Maxime Desjardins as Le grand duc
- Paul Bernard as Rodolphe adolescent
- Suzanne Bles
- Brunet as Cabrion
- Georges de la Noé
- Jules de Spoly
- Robby Guichard as Rodolphe enfant
- Mazalto as Madame Dubreuil
- Gisele Mundo as Madame Georges
- Madame Perrel as Madame Georges
- Ray-Roy
- Marceline Rouvier as Madame d'Orbigny
- Yvonne Vallet
- Maurice Vauthier as Le docteur Polidori
- Lucien Walter as Malicorne

== Bibliography ==
- Goble, Alan (1999). The Complete Index to Literary Sources in Film. Berlin: Walter de Gruyter. ISBN 978-3-11-095194-3.
