= Alsace (film) =

- Directed by: Henri Pouctal
- Starring: Gabrielle Réjane; Albert Dieudonné; Barbier; Camille Bardou; Berthe Jalabert; Francesca Flory; Bosman; Madame Villeroy-Got; Renée Lemercier; Yvonne Sergyl; Gilbert Dalleu; Roux
- Cinematography: Léonce-Henri Burel
- Production company: Le Film d'Art
- Release date: April 1916
- Country: France
- Language: French

A contemporary English-translated version of Alsace

Alsace is a 1916 French patriotic film, directed by Henri Pouctal. The film is starring Gabrielle Réjane, Albert Dieudonné, Barbier, Camille Bardou, Berthe Jalabert and Francesca Flory. It is based on the 1913 play by Gaston Leroux.

== Cast ==
- Gabrielle Réjane
- Albert Dieudonné
- Barbier
- Camille Bardou
- Berthe Jalabert
- Francesca Flory
- Bosman
- Madame Villeroy-Got
- Renée Lemercier
- Yvonne Sergyl
- Gilbert Dalleu
- Roux

== Plot ==
The story begins just before World War I in Alsace, the French province which was annexed to the German Empire as a consequence of the 1870 Franco-Prussian War. In the city of Thann, two families live next to each other: the French speaking Orbeys, who have never accepted the German annexation, and the German Schwartzes who celebrate Germany. During an open air bal, an Alsatian girl refuses to dance with a German soldier and this leads to a general brawl. Jeanne Orley, meeting some friends at home sings the French national anthem La Marseillaise. The German army intervenes and as a consequence her husband is condemned to three months in jail. At the end of his term he is expelled to France and she follows him.

Their son Jacques stays in Alsace to take care of their factory and he is obliged to do military service in the German army. When he is back home, the two Schwarz daughters come back home from boarding school and he falls in love with Marguerite, nicknamed Gretchen, which is strongly disapproved by his mother and his uncle. A few months later, Jacques falls severely ill and his mother goes herself to the Schwartzes to ask for Gretchen's hand for her son, understanding that it is the only thing who could save him. Once Jacques and Gretchen are married, some tensions appear, Jacques likes neither his in-laws' fascination for everything military nor his wife's cooking.

Things get much worse with the German mobilisation in 1914. Jeanne urges Jacques to go to France and join the French army as did his cousin René. Gretchen on the other hand asks him to comply with his conscription duty in Germany. Torn between his mother and his wife, Jacques finally decides to follow Gretchen's demand. When he arrives in front of the conscription office, he is identified as Frenchman by a crowd of excited German men and beaten up by them. He can just go back home and dies in his mother's arms. She tells Gretchen: "No, he is not yours ... he is mine now". An epilogue shows Jeanne on Jacques' grave, talking to him : "Jacques, my child, the hour of Revenge has sounded ... the French are here! Vive la France!".

== Production and release ==
The film was shot and released in 1916 while the war had been going on for nearly two years and would continue during two more years. The location of the story was very carefully chosen in order to be able to show a happy end with a victorious French army. In 1916, only a small part of Alsace, including Thann, had been liberated as a result of an offensive at the beginning of the war and most of the frontline, which remained pretty stable until 1918, was inside French territory.
