= The Little Thing (1923 film) =

1923 film

- Directed by: André Hugon
- Written by: Alphonse Daudet (novel); André Hugon
- Starring: Max de Rieux; Alexiane; Jean Debucourt
- Cinematography: Karémine Mérobian
- Music by: Marc Delmas
- Production company: Films André Hugon
- Distributed by: Pathé Consortium Cinéma
- Release date: 21 December 1923
- Running time: 115 minutes
- Country: France
- Languages: Silent; French intertitles

The Little Thing (French: Le petit chose) is a 1923 French silent film directed by André Hugon and starring Max de Rieux, Alexiane and Jean Debucourt. It is based on the 1868 work Le Petit Chose by Alphonse Daudet.

== Cast ==
- Max de Rieux as Daniel Eysette
- Alexiane as Camille Pierrotte
- Jean Debucourt as Jacques Eysette
- Claude Mérelle as Irma Borel
- Gilbert Dalleu as Le père de Pierrotte
- André Calmettes as Monsieur Viot
- Jeanne Bérangère as La fée aux lunettes

== Bibliography ==
- Rège, Philippe. Encyclopedia of French Film Directors, Volume 1. Scarecrow Press, 2009.
