= Berthe Jalabert =

French actress

Berthe Jalabert (Rennes, 31 October 1858 – after 1935) was a French stage and film actress. She was the daughter of the actor, theatre director, and playwright Louis Péricaud (1835-1909).

== Filmography ==
- 1914: L'Étau, by and with Maurice Mariaud
- 1914: Grand-Maman, by René Le Somptier
- 1914: Le Mannequin, by Henri Pouctal
- 1914: Claudie, fille d'auberge, by Henri Pouctal
- 1914: L'Enfant de la roulotte, by Louis Feuillade (1084 m) - as Mme d'Hauterive
- 1914: Madame Corentine, by Maurice Mariaud (1433 m)
- 1914: Mother, by Henri Fescourt (300 m)
- 1915: Le Blason, by Louis Feuillade - as Mme d'Estrées
- 1915: Pêcheur d'Islande, by Henri Pouctal
- 1915: Quand minuit sonna, by Charles Burguet (900 m)
- 1916: Alsace, by Henri Pouctal (1650 m)
- 1916: La Danseuse voilée, by Maurice Mariaud (1275 m) - Dona Concepcion
- 1916: Le Devoir, by Léonce Perret (1200 m) - Mme Barclay
- 1916: L'Hallali, by Jacques de Baroncelli (1400 m)
- 1916: Midinettes, by René Hervil and Louis Mercanton (1850 m) - Mme Daubrel
- 1916: Notre pauvre cœur, by Louis Feuillade (1485 m) - Mme Méry
- 1916: Le Prix du pardon, by Louis Feuillade
- 1916: Remember, by Charles Burguet (1025 m)
- 1916: Le Tournant, by René Hervil and Louis Mercanton (1650 m) - la duchesse de Bréville
- 1916: Un mariage de raison, by Louis Feuillade (1580 m) - Mme de Fontarche
- 1916: Le Crépuscule du cœur, by Maurice Mariaud (820 m)
- 1916: Fille d'Eve, by Gaston Ravel (400 m)
- 1916: Le malheur qui passe, by Louis Feuillade (990 m)
- 1916: Oh ! ce baiser / Oh ! that kiss, by René Hervil and Louis Mercanton (900 m)
- 1916: Les yeux qui accusent, by Charles Burguet (880 m)
- 1917: L'Âme de Pierre, by Charles Burguet (1300 m) - as La mère
- 1917: La Course du flambeau, by Charles Burguet (1550 m) - as Mme Fontenais
- 1917: Les Lois du monde, by Roger Lion (1050 m) - as Mme Harlé
- 1917: Mères françaises, by René Hervil and Louis Mercanton (1230 m) - as Mme Lebroux
- 1917: Les Mouettes, by Maurice Mariaud (1165 m)
- 1917: Le Passé de Monique, by Louis Feuillade (1450 m)
- 1918: Lorena, by Georges Tréville (1628 m) - as Mme Laurent
- 1918: Marion Delorme, by Henry Krauss (1500 m)
- 1918: La Mort des pirates / La Mort des sous marins, anonymous director (7400 m, en 7 épisodes)
- 1918: Le Scandale, by Jacques de Baroncelli (1450 m)
- 1918: Trois familles, by Alexandre Devarennes (1250 m)
- 1918: L'Exemple, anonymous propaganda film (560 m) - as La paysanne
- 1918: The Kiddies in the Ruins (1918) by Welsh and George Pearson (780 m)
- 1919: L'Effroyable Doute, by Jacques Grétillat (1325 m) - as Mme Bonin
- 1919: Les Étapes d'une douleur, by Jean Ayme (1200 m)
- 1919: Le Fils de Monsieur Ledoux, by Henry Krauss (1400 m) - as Mme Ledoux
- 1919: Marthe, by Gaston Roudès (1625 m)
- 1919: Quand on aime, by Henry Houry (released in 10 épisodes) - as Mme Quévilly
- 1919: Simplette, by René Hervi (1395 m) - as Mme Rouvière
- 1919: Un ours, by Charles Burguet (1060 m)
- 1920: Le Chevalier de Gaby, by Charles Burguet (1470 m) - as La tante
- 1920: Les Cinq Gentlemen maudits, by Luitz Morat and Pierre Régnier
- 1920: Gosse de riche, by Charles Burguet (2008 m) - as Maman Mougins
- 1920: Tout se paie, by Henry Houry (1740 m) - as Mme Corbières
- 1920: Vers l'argent, by René Plaissetty (1400 m)
- 1920: Zon, by Robert Boudrioz (1750 m) - as Mme Vergasson
- 1921: L'Essor, by Charles Burguet (10000 m, released in 10 episodes) - as Mme Lefranc
- 1921: Cendrillon, by Charles Maudru (1600 m)
- 1921: Gigolette, by Henri Pouctal (released in 4 periods) - as Mlle de Kergoven
- 1921: L'Infante à la rose, by Henry Houry (1800 m) - as Tia Maria
- 1921: Le Méchant Homme, by Charles Maudru (1760 m) - as Victorine
- 1921: La Vivante Épingle, by Jacques Robert (1890 m)
- 1922: L'Arlésienne, by André Antoine (2010 m) - as La Renaude
- 1922: La Bâillonnée, by Charles Burguet (5025 m), diffusé en 7 episodes) - as Mme Blandin
- 1922: Le Lac d'argent, by Gaston Roudès (1525 m) - as Mme Servais
- 1922: Margot, by Guy du Fresnay (1900 m) - as Mme Doradour de La Houville
- 1922: The Mysteries of Paris, by Charles Burguet (12070 m, released in 12 episodes) - Mme Séraphin
- 1923: L'Espionne, by Henri Desfontaines (2100 m)
- 1923: Frou-Frou, by Guy du Fresnay (1792 m) - as Mme de Valréas
- 1923: Le Gamin de Paris, by Louis Feuillade (1800 m) - as La grand-mère
- 1923: Petit ange et son pantin, by Luitz Morat (1700 m)
- 1923: Le Petit Moineau de Paris, by Gaston Roudès (2100 m) - as Mme Damien
- 1924: Altemer le cynique, by Georges Monca and Maurice Kéroul (2060 m) - as Mme Evremont, mère
- 1924: La Double Existence de Lord Samsey, by Georges Monca and Maurice Kéroul (2000 m) - as Mme Astorg
- 1924: Grand-mère, by Alberto-Francis Bertoni (2000 m) - as Maman Marlet
- 1924: L'Ironie du sort, by Georges Monca and Maurice Kéroul (2000 m) - as Mme Gauthier, mère
- 1925: Autour d'un berceau, by Georges Monca (2100 m) - as Mme Fréville
- 1925: Barocco, by Charles Burguet (2750 m) - as Georgina
- 1925: La Course du flambeau, by Luitz Morat (2200 m) - as Mme Fontenais
- 1925: L'Orphelin du cirque, by Georges Lannes (3000 m) - as Mme d'Arnaud
- 1926: L'Agonie de Jérusalem, by Julien Duvivier (2800 m) - as Mme Verdier
- 1926: Florine, la fleur du Valois, by E.B Donatien (3500 m) - as Mme Millet
- 1927: La Grande Épreuve, by Alexandre Ryder and A. Dugès - as Françoise Duchêne
- 1927: Le Martyre de sainte Maxence, by E.B Donatien - as Rosébie
- 1928: L'Aigle de la Sierra, by Louis de Carbonnat - as La grand-mère de Maria
- 1928: Verdun: Visions of History, by Léon Poirier (3600 m)
- 1930 : La Dernière Berceuse, by Gennaro Righelli and Jean Cassagne - as La gouvernante
- 1934 : La Maison dans la dune, by Pierre Billon
- 1935 : Golgotha, by Julien Duvivier - as Une suivante de Claudia

== Theatre ==
- 1909: La Revanche d'Ève, by Antony Mars and Alphonse de Beil, Théâtre du Palais-Royal as Fanny
- 1913: Les Femmes savantes, by Molière, directed by Léon Poirier and Henri Beaulieu, Comédie des Champs-Élysées
- 1913: Le Veau d'or, by Lucien Gleize, directed by Henri Beaulieu, Comédie des Champs-Élysées as Mme Lionel
- 1913: Le Trouble-fête, by Edmond Fleg, directed by Amable, Comédie des Champs-Élysées as Mme Gautray
- 1914: La Crise ministérielle, by Tristan Bernard, Comédie des Champs-Élysées as Mme Brisset
- 1914: Du vin dans son eau ou L'impôt sur le revenu, by Tristan Bernard, Comédie des Champs-Élysées as Mme Brisset
- 1924: Chifforton, by André Birabeau, Théâtre des Nouveautés as Félix
