= Jean-José Frappa =

French playwright and screenwriter (1882–1939)

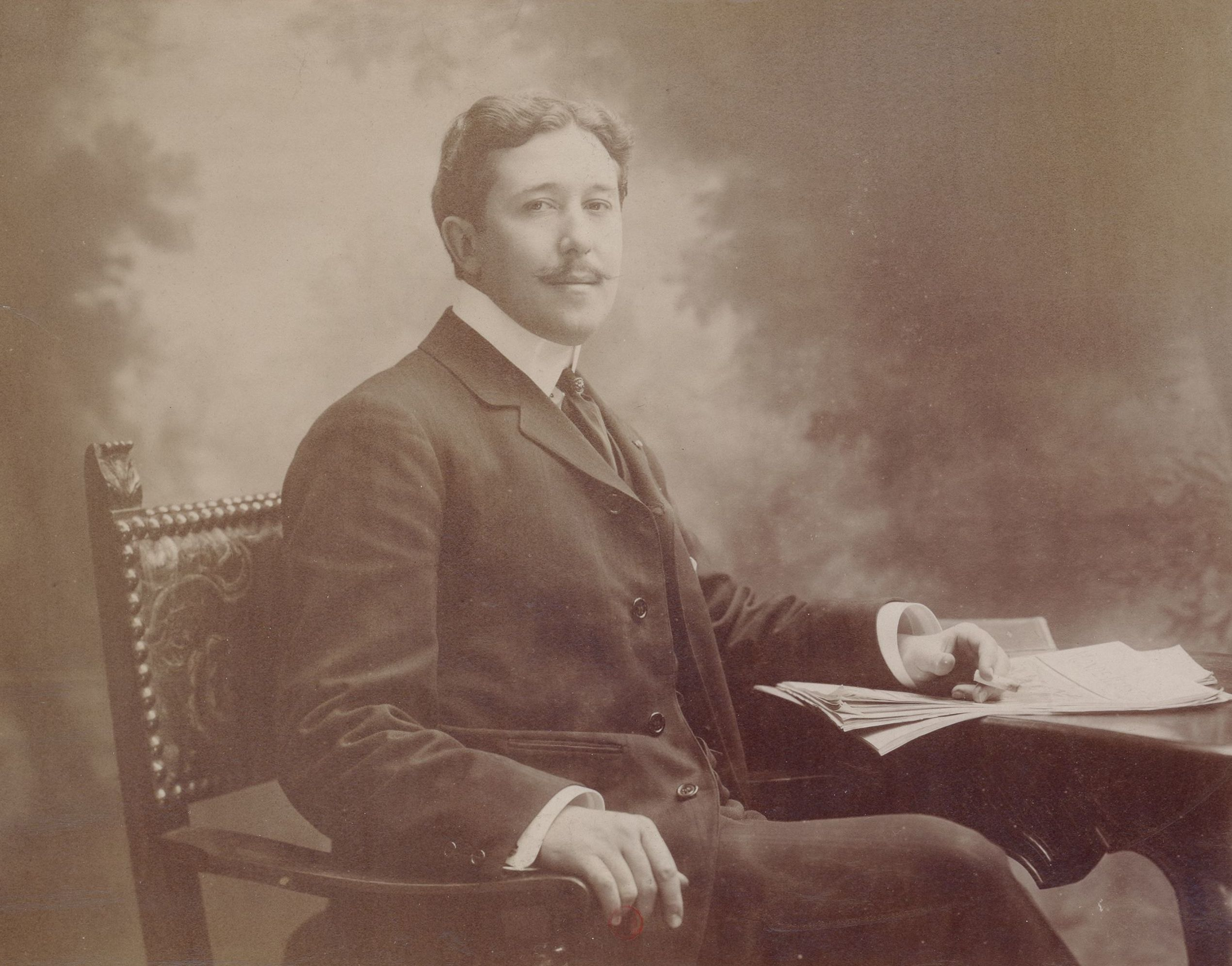
Jean-José Frappa

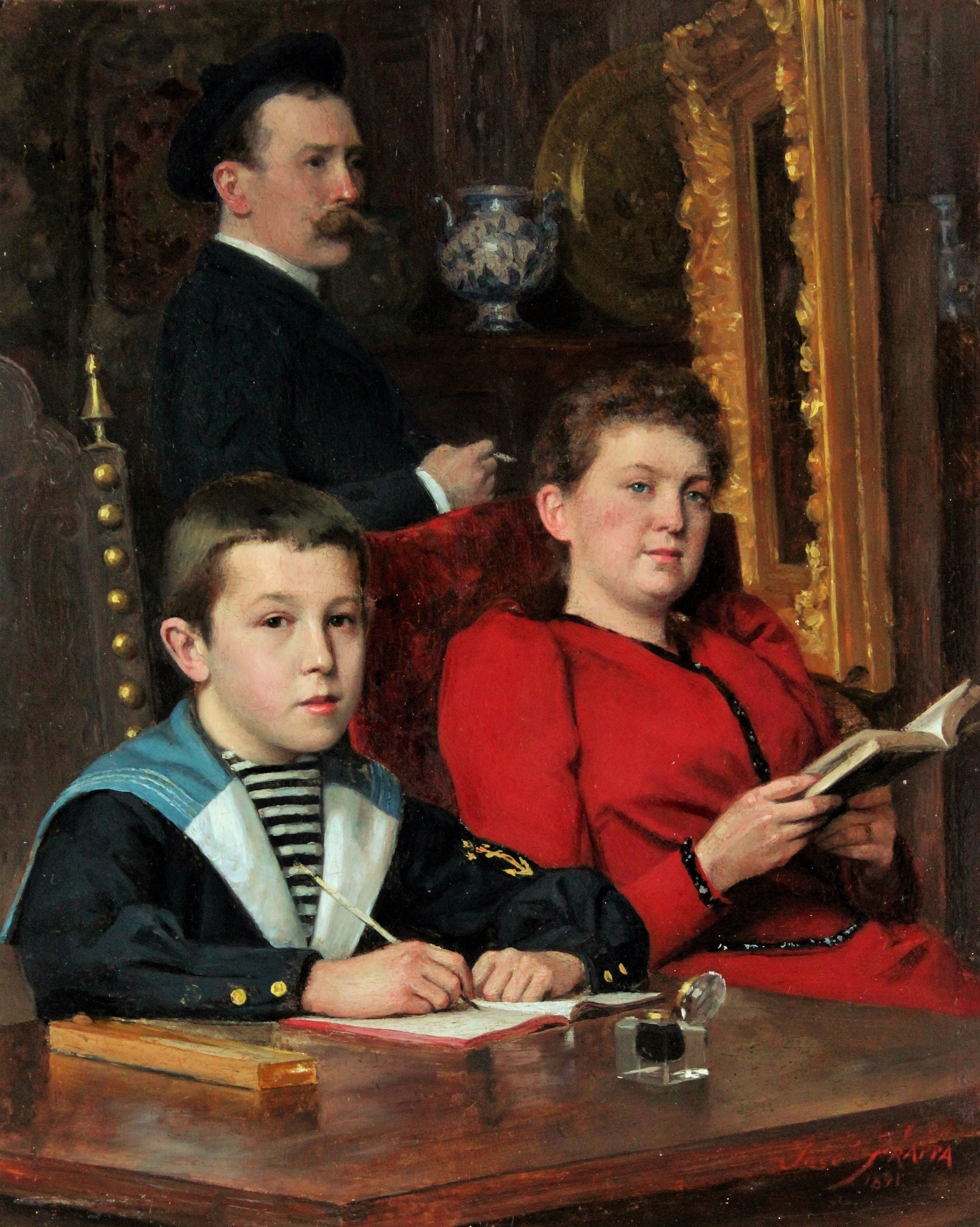
A family portrait by Frappa's father

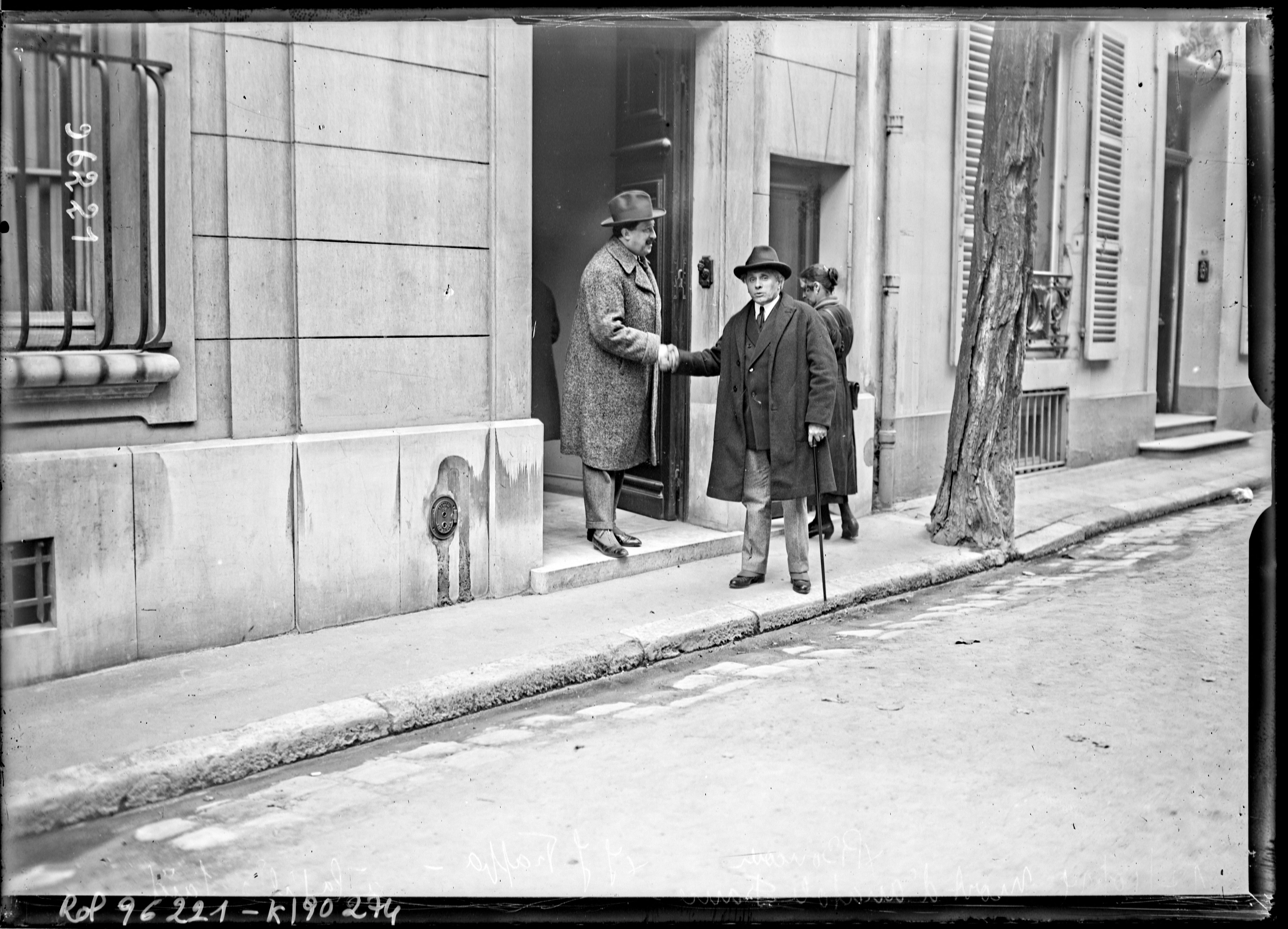
J. J. Frappa [et] P. Boncour à la villa Saïd

Jean-José Frappa (3 April 1882 – 1939) was a French playwright and screenwriter. Several of his works were made into films.

Henry Dupuy-Mazuel, a writing partner of Frappa, owned the news magazine Le Monde Illustré.

Like many French art critics, Frappa disdained the influx of foreign art into French salons. He advocated for the closure of salons to foreigners in 1912, writing, "This ever-growing invasion of métèques, most of them without talent, who come, no longer as in the past for the clear genius of our race, but to impose on us the mists or extravagances of theirs, is a real national peril..."

Frappa wrote the screenplay for the 1929 film The Marvelous Life of Joan of Arc, directed by Marco de Gastyne. He was of the opinion that non-Catholic foreigners wouldn't be able to present Jeanne d'Arc in "the true French tradition".

Painter José Frappa (1854–1904) was his father.

== Writings ==
- Le mariage in extremis (Marriage in extremis)
- "Un mariage in extermis" (1904)
- "L'evolution de Jacques Lambal" (1904)
- Le Baron de Batz (1911)
- Dernière Heure (Breaking news) (1912)
- "Silhouettes Contemporaines: Mme Madeleine Lemaire". Le Monde Illustré. 2552: 119. 1906.
- A Salonique sous l'œil des dieux! (1917)
- L'idée (1919)
- Les vieux bergers (1919)
- Match de boxe; comedie en trois actes, authored with Henry Dupuy-Mazuel
- L'Homme riche (1914), written with Henry Dupuy-Mazuel
- Makédonia: souvenirs d'un officier de liaison en Orient (1921)
- La Princesse aux clowns (The Princess and the Clowns) (1924)
- Enquête sur la prostitution (Investigation into prostitution) (1937)

== Filmography ==
- Billions (1920), adapted from L'Homme riche
- La princesse aux clowns (The Princess and the Clown) (1924)
- The Chess Player (1927)
- Saint Joan the Maid (1929)
- Accusé, levez-vous! (Accused, Stand Up!) (1930)
