= Delve =

Delve may refer to:

== People ==
- Frederick Delve (1902–1995), English firefighter
- Gareth Delve (born 1982), Welsh rugby union player
- John Delve (born 1953), English football player
- Suzanne Delvé (1892–1986), French film actress

== Places ==
- Delve, Schleswig-Holstein, Germany

== Other ==
- Delve Special, BBC programme
- Microsoft Delve
