= Jeanne Bérangère =

French actress (1864–1928)

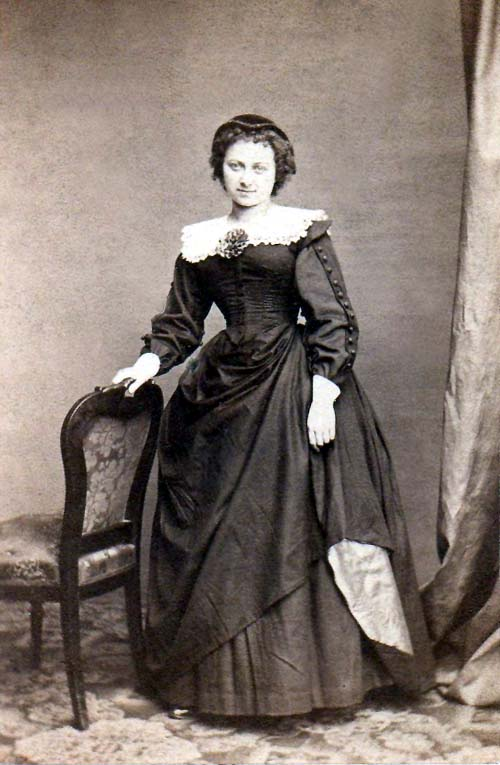
- Bérangère in the 1880s
- Born: Françoise Marie Charlotte Béraud; 9 June 1864; Ainay-le-Château, Second French Empire
- Died: 19 November 1928 (aged 64); Paris, French Third Republic
- Other name: Mademoiselle Bérangère
- Occupation: Actress
- Years active: 1880–1928

Jeanne Bérangère (born Françoise Marie Charlotte Béraud; 9 June 1864 – 19 November 1928) was a French stage and film actress whose career spanned nearly forty years on the stage and in films during the silent film era.

== Early life ==
Françoise Marie Charlotte Béraud was born on 9 June 1864 to Pierre and Appoline Béraud (née Dumont), wealthy landowners in Ainay-le-Château, Auvergne, France.

By the end of the 19th century she became a stage actress in Paris, billing herself as Mademoiselle Bérangère. She garnered a degree of national recognition by posing for series of postcards which helped spread her image across France. In 1909, she was chosen by French film director Michel Carré to appear in her first screen role in La peur (English title: Fear) opposite Henri Desfontaines.

== Film career ==
Following her appearance in La peur, Bérangère was placed under contract by brothers Emile and Charles Pathé for their film production company Pathé where she appeared in approximately twenty films between 1910 and 1913, including one of the first film portrayals of Cleopatra (Cléopâtre, 1910) and several films directed by Albert Capellani, before signing with the Éclair Film Company. At Éclair she appeared in a number of well regarded films, including the Charles Krauss adaptation of Honoré de Balzac's Trompe-la-Mort (1913). During World War I she largely refrained from appearing in films, preferring to working on the stages in Paris; one notable exception is the 1916 patriotic film Français!...n’oubliez jamais (English title: French!...Never Forget), directed by Robert Boudrioz and Roger Lion.

After the war, Jeanne Bérangère returned to the screen in Lucien Lehmann's Chimera (1918) alongside Edmond Van Daële, followed by two films by Marcel L'Herbier: L'homme du large (1920) and El Dorado (1921). She would spend her remaining years working in films for: Germaine Dulac, Victor Tourjansky, Yakov Protazanov, Raymond Bernard, André Hugon, Gaston Ravel, and Louis Mercanton. She would also appear in a number of serial films throughout the 1920s; most notably: L’essor (English title: Rise, 1920), which ran in ten installments and was directed by Charles Burguet; L’assomoir (English title: The Truncheon, 1921), which ran in four installments and was directed by Charles Maudru and Maurice de Marsan; Les mystères de Paris (English title: The Mysteries of Paris, 1922), which ran in twelve installments and again directed by Charles Burguet; and Belphégor (1926), which ran in four installments and was directed by Henri Desfontaines. Her final film role was in the 1928 Marcel Manchez directed La dame de bronze et le monsieur de cristal, opposite Marcel Vallée.

== Death ==
Jeanne Bérangère died in Paris on 19 November 1928 at the age of 64.

== Selected filmography ==
- Heart of an Actress (French title: Âme d'artiste) (1924)
- The Little Thing (French title: Le petit chose) (1923)
- The Gardens of Murcia (French title: Aux jardins de Murcie) (1923)
- The Mysteries of Paris (French title: Les mystères de Paris) (1922, serial)
- The Conspiracy (French title: Mademoiselle 100 millions) (1913)
