= Montmartre (1925 film) =

1925 film

- Directed by: Charles Burguet
- Written by: Charles Burguet; Henri Duvernois (novel)
- Starring: Gaby Morlay; Camille Bardou; Maurice Schutz
- Cinematography: Jéhan Fouquet; Jules Kruger
- Production company: Charles Burguet Films
- Distributed by: Compagnie Vitagraph de France
- Release date: 16 January 1925
- Country: France
- Languages: Silent; French intertitles

Montmartre (French: Faubourg Montmartre) is a 1925 French silent drama film directed by Charles Burguet and starring Gaby Morlay, Camille Bardou, and Maurice Schutz. It was remade in 1931 as a sound film, Montmartre, with Morlay reprising her role.

== Cast ==
- Gaby Morlay as Gevrinette
- Camille Bardou as Gennaro
- Maurice Schutz as Monsieur Gentilhomme
- Céline James as Céline Gentilhomme
- Marthe Ferrare as Irène Ballestrini
- Charles Lamy as Monsieur Gommier
- René Blancard as Frédéric Charançon
- André Brunet as Titi le boulanger
- Jeanne Bérangère as Tante Dada
- Sylviane de Castillo as La couturière
- Suzanne Delmas as Madame Pix
- Adrienne Duriez
- Madeleine Guitty as Madame Palladin
- Paul Valbret
- Renée van Delly
- Maurice Vauthier

== Bibliography ==
- Oscherwitz, Dayna; Higgins, MaryEllen (2009). The A to Z of French Cinema. Lanham, MD: Scarecrow Press. ISBN 978-0-8108-7038-3.
