= Accused, Stand Up! =

1930 film directed by Maurice Tourneur

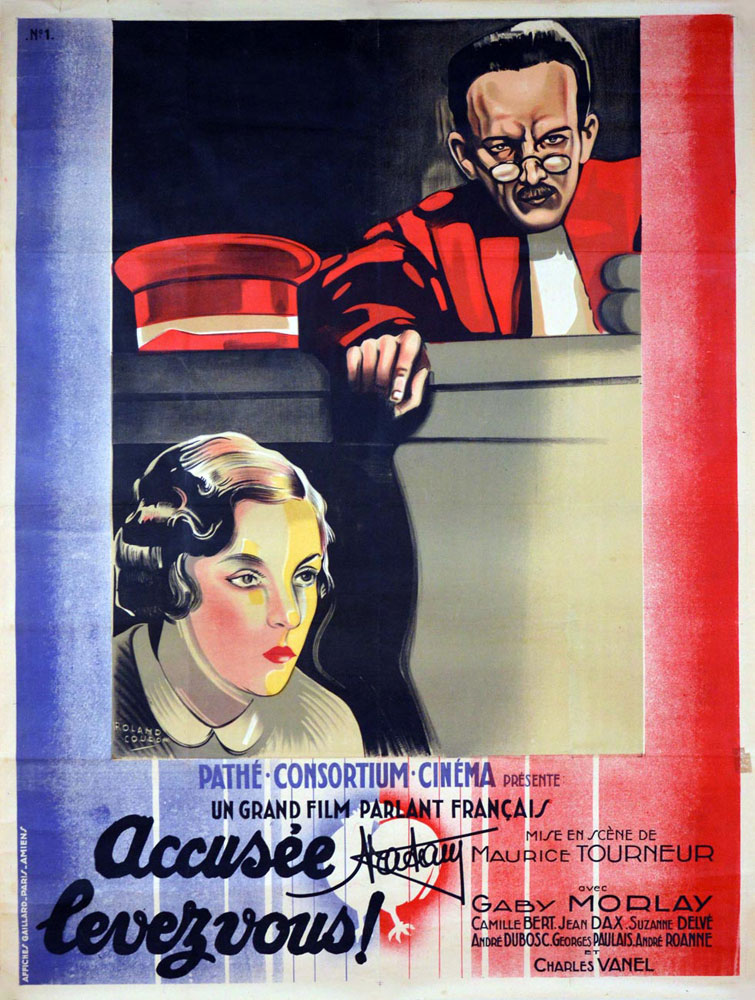
- Directed by: Maurice Tourneur
- Written by: Jean-José Frappa; Mary Murillo (novel)
- Produced by: Bernard Natan; Emile Natan
- Starring: Gaby Morlay; Suzanne Delvé; Camille Bert
- Cinematography: Victor Arménise
- Edited by: Jacques Tourneur
- Music by: Jose Lucchesi
- Production company: Pathé-Natan
- Distributed by: Pathé-Natan
- Release date: 12 September 1930
- Running time: 110 minutes
- Country: France
- Language: French

Accused, Stand Up! (French: Accusée, levez-vous!) is a 1930 French crime film directed by Maurice Tourneur and starring Gaby Morlay, Suzanne Delvé and Camille Bert. After the two female stars of a Parisian cabaret are seen arguing, one of them turns up dead. This leads to the arrest and trial of the other until the real culprit is caught.

The film's sets were designed by the art director Jacques Colombier.

== Cast ==
- Gaby Morlay as Gaby Delange
- Suzanne Delvé as Yvonne Delys
- Camille Bert as Le Défenseur
- Jean Dax as Désiré Larivière
- André Dubosc as Le Président du Tribunal
- Georges Paulais as L'Avocat Général
- Alexandre Mihalesco as Le Concierge
- André Roanne as André Darbois
- Charles Vanel as Henri Lapalle
- Raymond Aimos as Joueur de belote
- Octave Berthier as Le caissier
- Blanche Estival
- Guy Favières as L'huissier aux Assises
- Sola Fayarvay as Habilleuse noire
- Fignolita as Habilleuse
- Paul Franceschi as Flamberger, le vieil acteur
- Jean-François Martial as Consommateur au musette
- Gaston Mauger as Le directeur du théâtre Follies-Montmartre
- André Nicolle as Docteur Louis
- Jean Robert as Garde municipal
- Nicole Rozan as Nénett

== Bibliography ==
- Waldman, Harry. Maurice Tourneur: The Life and Films. McFarland, 2001.
