= The Chess Player =

1927 film directed by Raymond Bernard

The Chess Player Le Joueur d'échecs
- French language poster
- Directed by: Raymond Bernard
- Written by: Raymond Bernard; Jean-José Frappa
- Based on: Le Joueur d'échecs by Henry Dupuy-Mazuel
- Starring: Pierre Blanchar; Charles Dullin
- Cinematography: Joseph-Louis Mundviller; Marc Bujard
- Music by: Henri Rabaud
- Production company: La Société des Films Historiques
- Release date: 6 January 1927
- Running time: 135 minutes
- Country: France
- Language: silent
- Budget: FF 6 million

The Chess Player (French: Le Joueur d'échecs) is a 1927 French silent film directed by Raymond Bernard and based on a novel by Henry Dupuy-Mazuel. It is a historical drama set in the late 18th century during the Russian domination of Polish Lithuania, and elements of the plot are drawn from the story of the chess-playing automaton known as The Turk.

== Plot ==
In 1776, a young Polish patriot, Boleslas Vorowski, is wounded in an abortive uprising against the Russian forces in Vilnius. A reward for his capture is offered but he is sheltered by Baron von Kempelen, an inventor of lifelike automata, who plans to smuggle Vorowski, a skilful chess-player, to Germany concealed inside a chess-playing automaton called The Turk. Major Nicolaïeff, a Russian rival of Vorowski, challenges The Turk to a game and is defeated, but he realises that the machine is being secretly operated by Vorowski. He arranges for The Turk to be sent to Moscow to entertain the Empress Catherine II. When The Turk refuses to allow Catherine to cheat, the Empress orders that the automaton is to be executed by firing squad at dawn. During a masked ball, von Kempelen replaces Vorowski inside The Turk, to enable him to escape with his lover Sophie. Nicolaïeff, who has been sent to search von Kempelen's house, is slain by the inventor's sabre-wielding automata.

== Cast ==
- Pierre Blanchar as Boleslas Vorowski
- Charles Dullin as Baron von Kempelen; Wolfgang von Kempelen (1734–1804) was a Hungarian-born engineer who became known for many inventions, most famously his chess-playing machine, The Turk, which he created in 1769 to entertain the Empress Maria Theresa.
- Édith Jéhanne as Sophie Novinska
- Camille Bert as Major Nicolaïeff
- Pierre Batcheff as Prince Serge Oblonoff
- Jackie Monnier as Wanda
- Armand Bernard as Roubenko
- Marcelle Charles-Dullin as Catherine II, Empress of Russia.

== Production ==
The Chess Player was the second film Raymond Bernard made for the Société des Films Historiques, although on this occasion its subject matter of the Polish struggle for independence from Russia did not correspond with the company's avowed devotion to French history. Some scenes were filmed on location in Poland with the assistance of the Polish army (notably the Vilno insurrection and the large-scale cavalry charge). For many of the other spectacular locations, 35 sets were created at the Joinville Studios by Robert Mallet-Stevens and Jean Perrier; the most spectacular was the facade and courtyard of the Winter Palace, which covered some 5000 square metres of land beside the studio. Additional special effects were provided by the British film designer W. Percy Day. Filming began on 15 March 1926 and was completed on 31 October, leaving Bernard only two months for its post-production before the premiere in January 1927. An orchestral score was written for the film by Henri Rabaud.

The gala premiere at the Marivaux cinema in Paris was a huge success and the film went on to have a first run of three months at that cinema before its general release in the summer of 1927. Audiences were particularly impressed by the spectacular cavalry charge imagined by Sophie as she sings the Polish hymn of independence. The press reception in France was generally enthusiastic . The film was released in the UK in early 1928, and in the US in 1930 (where however the reviewer for The New York Times was unimpressed).

A restoration of the film was undertaken in the 1980s, led by Kevin Brownlow and David Gill. In the absence of any definitive negative or print, it required the collaboration of several European film archives from which material in several variant copies was collated; sources in an East German archive and the Cinémathèque Municipale in Luxembourg provided the most complete material. The finished tinted print received its first screenings in London in December 1990, with Henri Rabaud's original score conducted by Carl Davis.
