= The Conspiracy (1913 film) =

- Directed by: Maurice Tourneur
- Starring: André Dubosc
- Production company: Société Française des Films Éclair
- Release date: 26 December 1913
- Country: France
- Languages: Silent; French intertitles

The Conspiracy (French: Mademoiselle 100 millions) is a 1913 French silent crime film directed by Maurice Tourneur.

== Cast ==
- André Dubosc as Marquis de Kermor
- Jeanne Bérangère as Sidonia de Bressieu
- Damorès as Henri de Kermor
- Jane Maylianes as Jeanne de Brenn
- Bahier as Baron de Bressieu
- Henri Gouget as Secrétaire Delrue

== Bibliography ==
- Mary Lea Bandy. Rediscovering French Film. Museum of Modern Art, 1983.
