= André Dubosc =

French actor (1866–1935)

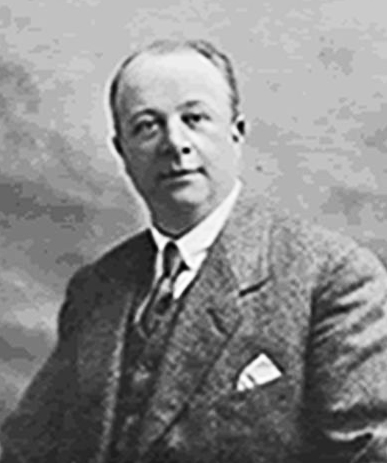
- Born: César Auguste Dubosc; 30 March 1866; Paris, France
- Died: 20 December 1935 (aged 69); Paris, France
- Occupation: Actor
- Years active: 1912–1935 (film)

André Dubosc (1866–1935) was a French stage and film actor.

== Selected filmography ==
- The Conspiracy (1913)
- Lord Arthur Savile's Crime (1922)
- Happy Couple (1923)
- Jack (1925)
- Lady Harrington (1926)
- The Crystal Submarine (1927)
- Prince Jean (1928)
- Tenderness (1930)
- Accused, Stand Up! (1930)
- His Highness Love (1931)
- Make a Living (1931)
- The Brothers Karamazov (1931)
- Montmartre (1931)
- The Chocolate Girl (1932)
- If You Wish It (1932)
- The Woman Dressed As a Man (1932)
- Once Upon a Time (1933)
- A Love Story (1933)
- The Lady of the Camellias (1934)
- If I Were Boss (1934)
- Moses and Solomon, Perfumers (1935)
- Koenigsmark (1935)
- Les yeux noirs (1935)

== Bibliography ==
- Goble, Alan. The Complete Index to Literary Sources in Film. Walter de Gruyter, 1999.
