= Barocco (1925 film) =

1925 film

- Directed by: Charles Burguet
- Written by: Georges André-Cuel (novel)
- Starring: Nilda Duplessy; Jean Angelo; Charles Vanel
- Cinematography: Jéhan Fouquet
- Production company: Grandes Productions Cinématographiques
- Distributed by: Grandes Productions Cinématographiques
- Release date: 20 November 1925
- Country: France
- Languages: Silent; French intertitles

Barocco is a 1925 French silent adventure film directed by Charles Burguet and starring Nilda Duplessy, Jean Angelo, and Charles Vanel.

== Cast ==
- Nilda Duplessy as Gisèle
- Jean Angelo as Jean de Kerauden
- Charles Vanel as Barocco
- Suzy Vernon as Enid Hanseley
- Camille Bardou as Le professeur Latouche
- Maurice Luguet as Aucagne
- Paul Franceschi as Gunther
- Berthe Jalabert as Georgina
- Labusquière as Un chacouch
- Charles Burguet as M. Hanseley

== Bibliography ==
- Parish, James Robert. Film Actors Guide. Scarecrow Press, 1977.
