= Tsutsui Tokujirō =

Japanese performer

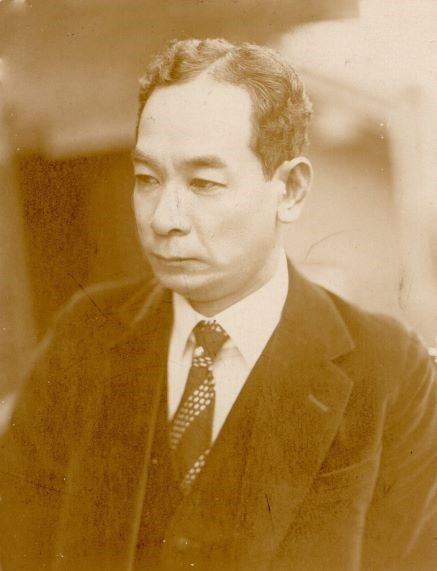
- Born: 1881; Osaka
- Died: 1953 (aged 71–72); Kyoto

Tsutsui Tokujirō (1881-1953) was a Japanese performer born in Osaka, Japan.

== Career ==
Tokujirō began his performance career at 19, performing in a shinpa troupe led by Fukui Mohei^{:23} In 1920 he joined a group of actors who were not satisfied with the work of Sawada Shōjirō, the artistic director of Shinkokugeki (New National Theatre).^{:23} Together they formed a new troupe, which toured the Kansai region, though they also had several shows in Asakusa.^{:23} As part of the troupe he 'established a solid reputation in kengeki swordplay dramas.^{:21}

=== Western tour (1930-31) ===
The Tsutsui Troupe was one of the first groups to bring traditional Japanese performance to the United States and Europe. His troupe performed in twenty-two countries,^{:3} with attendees including seminal directors such as Bertolt Brecht,^{:255} Jacques Copeau, Charles Dullin, and Vsevolod Meyerhold.^{:154, n.192}

They had a repertoire of sixteen plays that were based on Kabuki plays 'in a mélange of styles with an emphasis on swordplay to appeal to audiences.'^{:154, n.192} Four of the plays were presented only for Japanese residents in California, and were absent from the rest of the tour.^{:35} Tsutsui emphasised that he 'wanted to put the Western audience in the presence of the true Japanese theatre, such as the Japanese conceive it'.^{:135} Contemporary critics, however, questioned this authenticity, noting the number of changes Tsutsui made to traditional Japanese theatre.^{:136} These included the shortened length of the plays (which had to be under two hours),^{:33} the use of painted scenery and 'enormous stage settings' in a Western style, 'the troupe's replacement of onnagata', roles traditionally played by male transvestites, with actresses.^{:136}

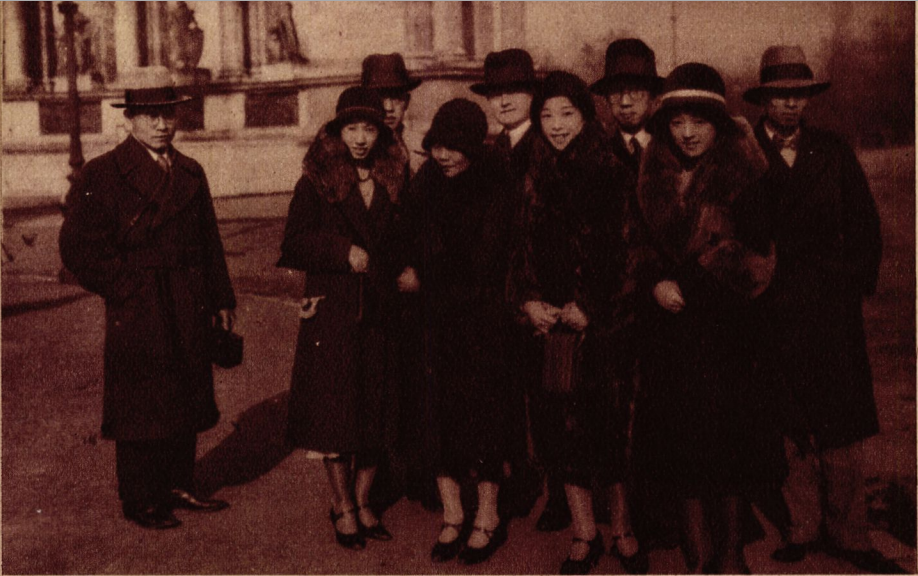
Tokujiro and cast visit Budapest during the time of their performances in Városi Színház (City Theatre) in November, 1930.

==== Selected performance locations ====
| Date | City | Country | Theatre | Notes | Reference |
|---|---|---|---|---|---|
| February 1930 | Los Angeles | United States | Figueroa Theatre | Under the production of Michio Itō | ^{:154} |
| March–April 1930 | New York City | United States | Booth Theatre | | ^{:344} |
| 2 May–June 1930 | Paris | France | Théâtre Pigalle | Attended by Edwin Piscator.^{:68} | ^{:135} |
| 24 June 1930 | London | England | Globe Theatre | | |
| 18-25 August 1930 | Paris | France | Apollo | | ^{:185} |
| 3-9 October 1930 | Berlin | Germany | Theater des Westens | Attended by Bertolt Brecht.^{:41} | ^{:255} |
