= Dance Hall (1931 film) =

1931 film directed by Maurice Tourneur

- Directed by: Maurice Tourneur
- Written by: Paul Reboux (novel); Maurice Tourneur
- Starring: Gaby Morlay; Charles Vanel; Madame Ahnar
- Cinematography: Victor Arménise; Marc Bujard
- Edited by: Jacques Tourneur
- Production company: Pathé-Natan
- Distributed by: Pathé Consortium Cinéma
- Release date: 9 January 1931
- Running time: 85 minutes
- Country: France
- Language: French

Dance Hall (French: Maison de danses) is a 1931 French drama film directed by Maurice Tourneur and starring Gaby Morlay, Charles Vanel and Madame Ahnar. The film's sets were designed by the art director Robert Gys.

== Cast ==
- Gaby Morlay as Estrella
- Charles Vanel as Ramon
- Madame Ahnar as La Tomasa
- Edmond Van Daële as Benito
- José Noguéro as Luisito
- Delphine Abdala
- Madame Sapiani as Madame
- Christiane Tourneur as Amalia
- Jules Mondos as Don Cristobal
- Raymond Cordy
- Marcel Maupi

== Bibliography ==
- Dayna Oscherwitz & MaryEllen Higgins. The A to Z of French Cinema. Scarecrow Press, 2009.
