= Tenderness (1930 film) =

1930 film

- Directed by: André Hugon
- Written by: Henry Bataille (play)
- Starring: Marcelle Chantal; Jean Toulout; André Dubosc
- Cinematography: Raymond Agnel
- Music by: René Sylviano
- Production company: Films André Hugon
- Distributed by: Pathé-Natan
- Release date: 16 May 1930
- Running time: 84 minutes
- Country: France
- Language: French

Tenderness (French: La tendresse) is a 1930 French drama film directed by André Hugon and starring Marcelle Chantal, Jean Toulout and André Dubosc. The film's sets were designed by the art director Christian-Jaque. It is based on the 1922 play of the same title by Henry Bataille. A separate German-language version Zärtlichkeit was also produced.

== Synopsis ==
A celebrated member of the Académie Française believes that his much younger wife believes that she is in love with him. However, he comes to suspect he is wrong and falls seriously ill. Yet her care and concern for him as she nurses him back to health convinces him of her tenderness.

== Cast ==
- Marcelle Chantal as Marthe Dellières
- Jean Toulout as L'académicien Paul Barnac
- André Dubosc as Genine
- José Noguéro as Jarville, L'amant
- Pierre Juvenet as Jaliguy
- Lucien Baroux as Carlos Jarry
- Micheline Masson as Le petite Jacquot
- Jean Bara
- Claire Nobis
- Lucien Nobis
- Raymonde Sonny

== Bibliography ==
- Oscherwitz, Dayna & Higgins, MaryEllen. The A to Z of French Cinema. Scarecrow Press, 2009.
