= Martyr (1927 film) =

1927 film

- Directed by: Charles Burguet
- Written by: Charles Burguet
- Based on: Adolphe d'Ennery (novel) (1886)
- Starring: Charles Vanel; Suzy Vernon; Jean Angelo
- Cinematography: Jéhan Fouquet
- Production company: Charles Burguet Films
- Release date: 1927
- Country: France
- Languages: Silent; French intertitles

Martyr (French: Martyre) is a 1927 French silent drama film directed by Charles Burguet and starring Charles Vanel, Suzy Vernon, and Jean Angelo.

It adapts the novel of the same title by Adolphe d'Ennery.

== Cast ==
- Charles Vanel
- Maxime Desjardins
- Desdemona Mazza
- Suzy Vernon
- Jean Angelo
- Camille Bardou
- Georges Flateau
- Suzanne Delvé
- Suzanne Munte
- Maurice Sibert
- Renée van Delly
- Marguerite de Morlaye

== Bibliography ==
- Alfred Krautz. International directory of cinematographers, set- and costume designers in film, Volume 4. Saur, 1984.
- Martyre - text of the novel on Gallica
