= Montmartre (duo) =

- Origin: Paris, France
- Genres: Electronica; electro house
- Years active: 2014–present
- Members: Hugo Lab; Alex Enki
- Website: www.montmartremusic.com

Montmartre started as a French electronic music duo made up of Hugo Lab and Alex Enki. It's now Hugo Lab only since 2021.

== Background ==
Guitarist Hugo comes from a classical upbringing originally playing the cello and attending music school, whilst Alex’s background is in producing electronic music. The name Montmartre comes from the district in Paris where their studio is located.

== Career ==
In 2014, Montmartre received 3rd place in a worldwide competition for a remix of C2C’s ‘Happy’ and following this have released remixes for artists such as Adele, Bob Marley, Daft Punk & The Kooks.

On 1 January 2014 Montmartre released their debut EP titled ‘Inside Of Me’ which featured two original songs as well as remixes from Yuksek, Skogsrå, Robotaki and Knucle G.

On 15 April 2016 Montmartre released their debut LP entitled ‘Hope’.

Critics have compared Montmartre to artists such as Daft Punk, Phoenix & Empire of the Sun.
