= Suzanne Delvé =

French actress (1892–1986)

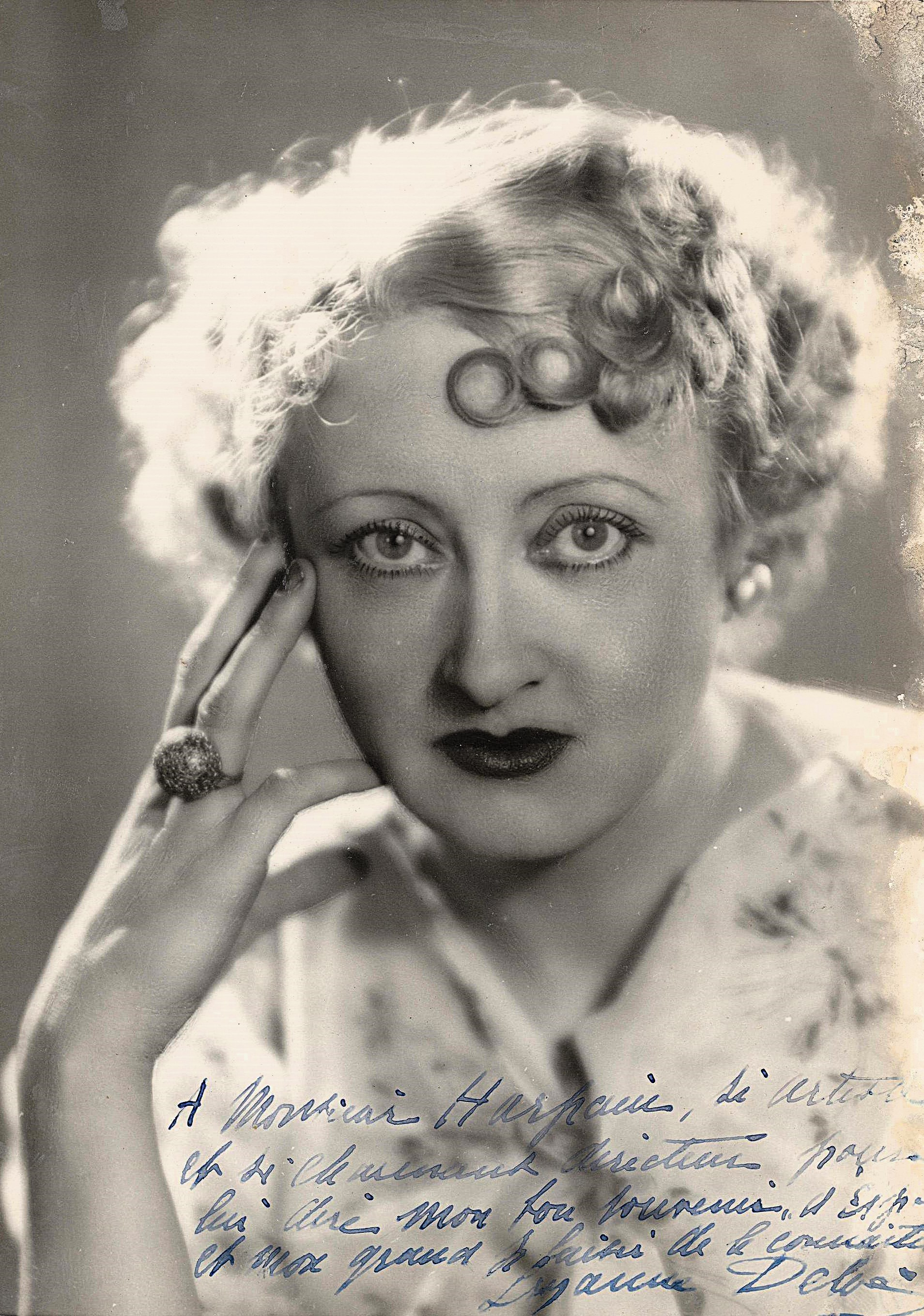
- Suzanne Delvé in 1940
- Born: 24 November 1892; Paris, France
- Died: 10 August 1986 (aged 93)
- Other name: Suzanne Lucie Charlotte Vedelle
- Occupation: Actress
- Years active: 1914 - 1938 (film)

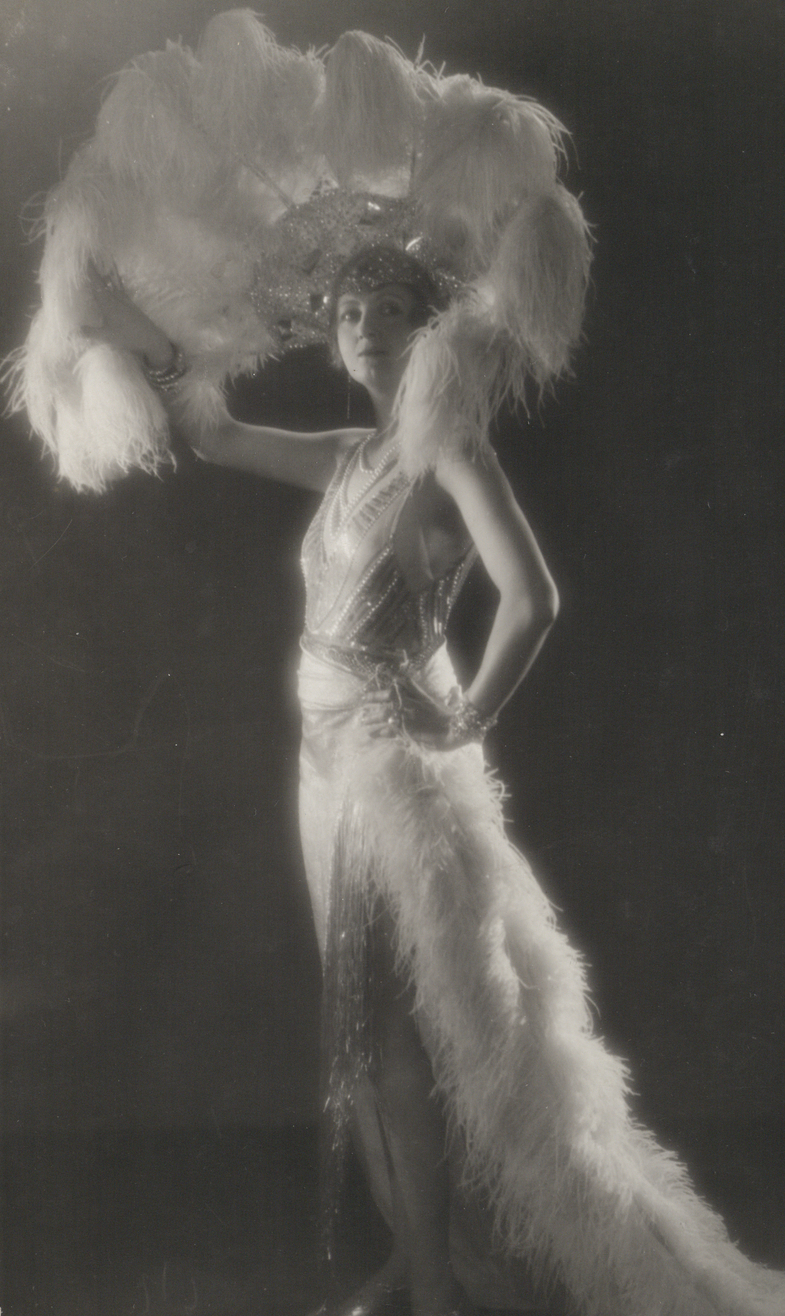
Suzanne Delvé

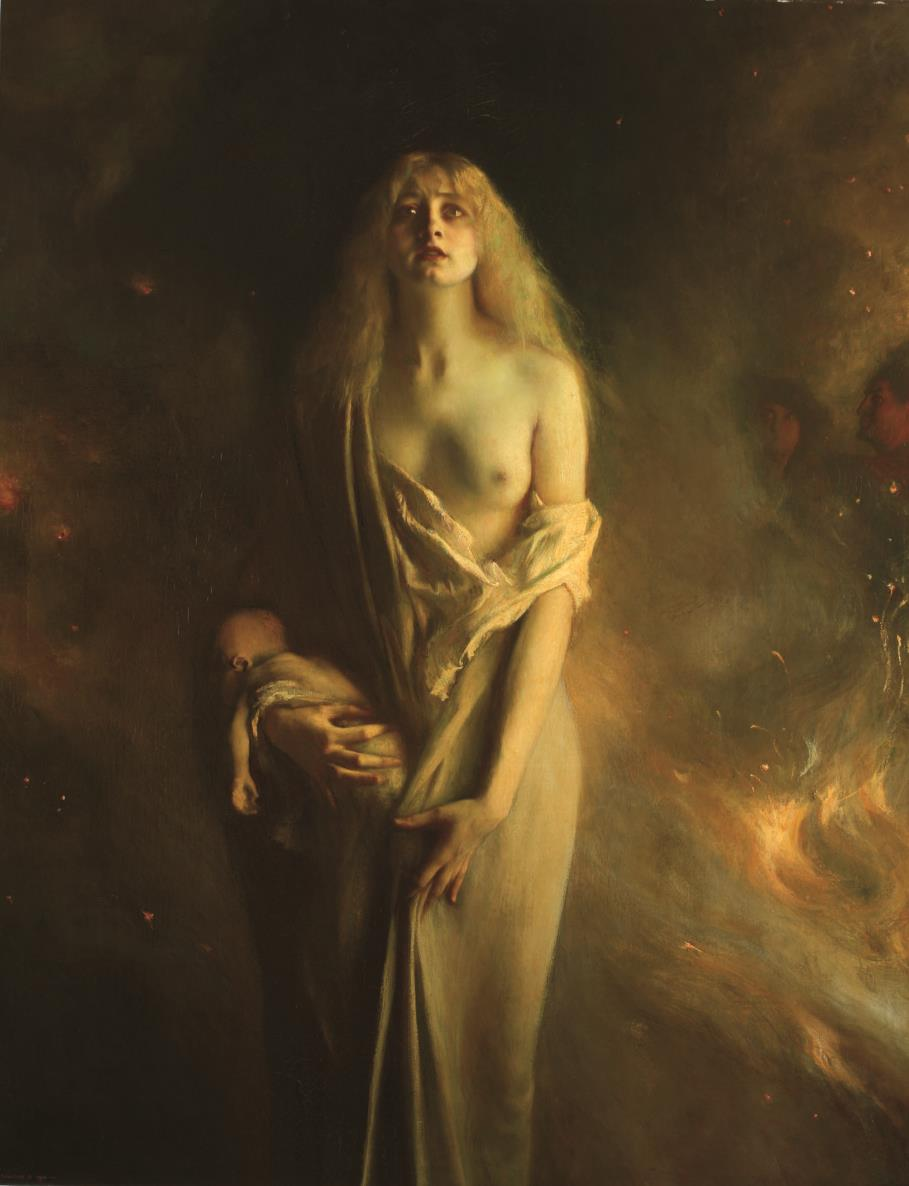
Delvé as Marguerite, from the Faust

Suzanne Delvé (24 November 1892– 10 August 1986) was a French film actress. While most of her roles were during the silent era, she also appeared in a few sound films such as Maurice Tourneur's Accused, Stand Up! (1930). She claimed to be the model in Paul Émile Chabas' September Morn and was credited as a model for other prominent French artists of the time, such as in Pascal Dagnan-Bouveret's Marguerite au Sabbat.

== Selected filmography ==
- Les Vampires (1916)
- Rose de Nice (1921)
- The Cradle of God (1926)
- Martyr (1927)
- Accused, Stand Up! (1930)
- A Father Without Knowing It (1932)
- Golden Venus (1938)

== Bibliography ==
- Waldman, Harry. Maurice Tourneur: The Life and Films. McFarland, 2001.
