= Wooden Crosses =

1932 film directed by Raymond Bernard

Wooden Crosses (Les Croix de Bois)
- Directed by: Raymond Bernard
- Written by: Raymond Bernard; André Lang
- Based on: Roland Dorgelès
- Produced by: Bernard Natan
- Starring: Pierre Blanchar; Gabriel Gabrio; Charles Vanel
- Cinematography: Jules Kruger
- Edited by: Lucienne Grumberg
- Color process: Black and white
- Production company: Pathé-Natan
- Distributed by: Pathé-Natan
- Release date: 17 March 1932
- Running time: 115 minutes
- Country: France
- Languages: French; English

Wooden Crosses (French: Les Croix de Bois) is a 1932 French anti-war film by Raymond Bernard based upon the autobiographical novel of the same name written by Roland Dorgelès.

== Filming ==
The film is set some time after the Great Retreat, where the British Expeditionary Force and the French 5th Army fought a fighting retreat to the Marne. The events follow Gilbert Demachy, a young French law student, who enlisted in the French army some time after 2 August 1914, and the infantry squad he joins.

The producer, Bernard Natan, himself a veteran of the First World War and a Croix de Guerre recipient, wished to make those watching the film "hate and despise war". He was given free rein to use Pathé's new sound department to create recordings of explosions and gunshots, something he referred to as "the reconstitution of the sonic ambience of the battles".

A large amount of the film was filmed in Mont Cornillet on the outskirts of Reims in Champagne, where Raymond Bernard said they "simply had to redig the trenches, traces of which were still in evidence." He used detectors from the army to search for and remove unexploded munitions due to the risk of the fake shells used in filming setting them off. They were then detonated in specially dug pits behind the cameras while lines were being delivered. Whether accidental or on purpose, detonating these shells would often expose militaria and corpses. The battles were described as "vibrant and convincing", with Bernard insisting that every actor have some form of combat experience. One such example is Pierre Blanchar, who was a victim of a gas attack in Verdun in 1916.

== Cast (in credits order) ==
- Pierre Blanchar as Gilbert Demachy
- Gabriel Gabrio as Sulphart
- Charles Vanel as Caporal Breval
- Raymond Aimos as Soldat Fouillard
- Antonin Artaud as Vieublé
- Paul Azaïs as Broucke
- René Bergeron as Hamel
- Raymond Cordy as Vairon
- Marcel Delaitre as Sergent Berthier
- Jean Galland as Capitaine Cruchet
- Pierre Labry as Bouffioux
- Geo Laby as Belin
- Jean-François Martial as Lemoine
- René Montis as Lieutenant Morache
- Marc Valbel as Maroux

== Plot ==
When Demachy joins his unit, 5th Squad, 3rd Company, 39th Infantry Regiment, they are resting in the rear and he is introduced to the rest of the squad by Caporal Breval. After getting settled in by Sulphart, who is described as the "company loudmouth" by Breval, Demachy discusses his life before enlisting with Breval while the rest of the squad drinks and dances. Soon after, they notice another group of soldiers solemnly passing by, two carrying a stretcher with a body on it, one carrying a large wooden cross and another four following them. They fall silent, turning to salute as they pass.

The squad is sent to a front line trench and, when they reach it that night, Sulphart and Lemoine are sent on first watch while the rest of the squad takes shelter in a large dugout. Another soldier comes into the dugout to find volunteers for a patrol, which Demachy and Vairon volunteer for. They join three others who are sent to crawl over no man's land and reconnoitre a German position. As they move towards the position, Vairon tells the others to stop while he and Demachy move further; they find that the position is manned by a group of German soldiers around a fire, one of which is singing. Gunfire soon disturbs them as artillery begins to fall on the German trench, causing the pair to quickly return to the other three soldiers and retreat. Believing the returning patrol is an attacking force, the men in the dugout rush to defend, although they are informed that it is the returning patrol. As the patrol retreats, Vairon is shot in the chest, killing him instantly.

When the patrol returns, the squad mourns him, returning to the dugout. All but Demachy try to sleep, who hears the Germans mining underneath them. Alerting the rest of the dugout, he runs to tell Sergent Berthier and Lieutenant Morache, who come to the dugout with an engineering officer. Confirming the mining, they try to leave to inform their command, but are stopped by a soldier who asks whether they should remain in the dugout; the squad is told to remain in the dugout and not to worry, saying "They're far from done. There's no danger." Although this distresses them, the squad attempts to cheer each-other up. Three days later, the squad expects to be relieved by another unit, though the Germans were still digging and were, unbeknownst to them, setting explosives. They were relieved some time after 9:07 PM and inform the relieving unit of the Germans beneath the dugout. As 5th Squad leaves the trench network, the explosives are detonated.

Now resting in the rear, the squad uses their downtime to celebrate and maintain their equipment. Bouffioux delivers mail to them, handing out letters and parcels to the squad before finding a letter that was addressed to Vairon. Demachy takes his letter and the one addressed to Vairon and walks away, finding some flowers as he walks to where a cross was placed for Vairon. He places the flowers next to the cross and tears up Vairon's letter, leaving the pieces there.

Soon after, they are issued knives, helmets and cigars and sent back to the front. When they arrive, they join an attack which attempts to retake a French village. As German artillery saturates their lines, they go over the top; the attack breaches the German's first line of defence, and they are about to assault its third when Capitain Cruchet is killed; as they continue the assault, Hamel is also killed. The battle continued for ten days, during which time Fouillard is killed.

While the remaining members of the squad take shelter in a cemetery, one complains about the lack of water. One of the soldiers moves to the hole that Breval, Bouffioux and another are in to tell Breval about it, after which they discuss who will go to the nearby well to fill their canteens. After a short discussion, Breval decides to go himself. As he nears the well, he is spotted by a pair of Germans. They fire a single shot when he reaches the well, hitting him in the chest. Demachy, despite Sulphart trying to stop him, leaves their hole and goes to rescue Breval. Despite the pair of Germans shooting at him too, he rescues Breval, bringing him back to a ruined mausoleum. The remaining members of the squad gather around them, but are soon forced to leave as the Germans attack, leaving Demachy and Sulphart with Breval as he dies. Soon after, artillery strikes the cemetery.

Now back in the rear, Lemoine and Sulphart return from leave, with Lemoine speaking of his time back on the farm and Sulphart telling Demachy about how he visited Demachy's family. As Bouffioux watches through a gate, he sees a convoy of ambulances passing through, noting that there had been a lot that day. As reinforcements arrive and those who are about to go on leave prepare, they are informed that leave is cancelled and that they are expected to head to an assembly area with their equipment to return to the front.

They reach their dugout at night, hearing an injured French soldier calling for help just beyond their lines. The squad they were relieving tells them about him, saying that two other soldiers had died trying to help him. Bouffioux is asked to take first watch, but he complains and Lemoine chooses to take his place, leaving the dugout. Hearing artillery landing nearby, the squad shouts for Lemoine, but he doesn't reply. One goes out to search for him, returning soon after and reporting he was dead. Demachy went up next, sitting next to a dead soldier as he tries to drown out the noise of the injured man beyond the trench.

The following day, they join an attack. Artillery starts to strike near their trench, with one shell landing in front of Sulphart. Shrapnel hits his hand, forcing him to head to an aid station. He is told he will likely lose two of his fingers, but he remarks that he hopes Demachy will return safely. During the attack, Bouffioux is shot in the chest and Demachy is wounded by artillery, forcing him to stop. A stretcher-bearer tries to reach him, but he too is hit by artillery, killing him. That night, Demachy attempts to crawl back to his trench, but is forced to stop by the pain and lean against a tree, where he stayed until his death.

== Reception ==
When filming was finished, Bernard went with Dorgelès to visit President Paul Doumer to ask whether he would attend the premiere at Moulin Rouge. He not only accepted, he also invited Bernard and Dorgelès to watch the screening in his personal box. They sat behind Doumer, with Bernard saying "I was incredibly moved and all the more so because you could have heard a pin drop in the auditorium. It was utterly silent. No one uttered a sound. Suddenly Roland Dorgelès nudged me with his elbow and pointed to the bowed head of President Paul Doumer, who was wiping away a tear. I must admit, I was deeply moved by that. I felt rewarded for all my efforts by that tear." Doumer died a few days later.

Although Wooden Crosses was well received in France, it did not receive much attention outside of Europe aside from an American film named The Road to Glory, which was a loose remake of Wooden Crosses released in 1936. There were reports that Wooden Crosses caused veterans to commit suicide due to its accuracy, with one such report occurring as late as 1962 after its first TV screening.

Speaking in 2015, Philip French, a writer for The Guardian, said of the film "with an all-male cast speaking military slang, and a soundtrack of natural sound, spine-chilling ordnance and incidental music, Wooden Crosses is an intense experience of pain, stoic endurance and survival."
