= Le Miracle des loups (1961 film) =

Le Miracle des loups (Blood on his Sword)
- Directed by: André Hunebelle
- Written by: Henry Dupuy-Mazuel; Pierre Foucau; Jean Halain
- Produced by: Charles Delac; André Hunebelle; Pierre Cabaud; René Bezard; Marcello Danon
- Starring: Jean Marais; Rosanna Schiaffino
- Cinematography: Marcel Grignon
- Edited by: Jean Feyte
- Music by: Jean Marion
- Distributed by: Pathé Consortium Cinéma
- Release date: 6 September 1961
- Running time: 100 minutes; 126 minutes (France)
- Country: France
- Language: French
- Box office: 3,784,157 admissions (France)

Le Miracle des loups (English: The Miracle of the Wolves), aka Blood on his Sword, is a French / Italian swashbuckler film from 1961, directed by André Hunebelle, written by Henry Dupuy-Mazuel, starring Jean Marais. The scenario was based on a novel by Henry Dupuy-Mazuel. The film was known under the title "Im Zeichen der Lilie" (West Germany), "Blood on His Sword" or "The Miracle of the Wolves" (USA).

Numerous scenes were filmed at the Cité de Carcassonne.

The action begins in June 1467, when Charles the Bold has just become Duke of Burgundy. The story unfolds over the subsequent months.

== Cast ==
- Jean Marais : Robert de Neuville
- Rosanna Schiaffino (VF : Claire Guibert) : Jeanne de Beauvais
- Jean-Louis Barrault : Louis XI
- Roger Hanin : Charles le Téméraire
- Guy Delorme: Le comte Jean de Sénac
- Annie Anderson: Catherine du Tillais ou Marguerite
- Louis Arbessier: Le comte d'Hesselin
- Jean Marchat: L'archevêque
- Raoul Billerey : Jérôme
- Pierre Palfray : Mathieu
- Georges Lycan : Sire de Gavray
- Bernard Musson : Un évêque
- Paul Préboist : A baladin

== See also ==
- Le Miracle des loups (1924 film)
