= Charles Dullin =

French actor and director

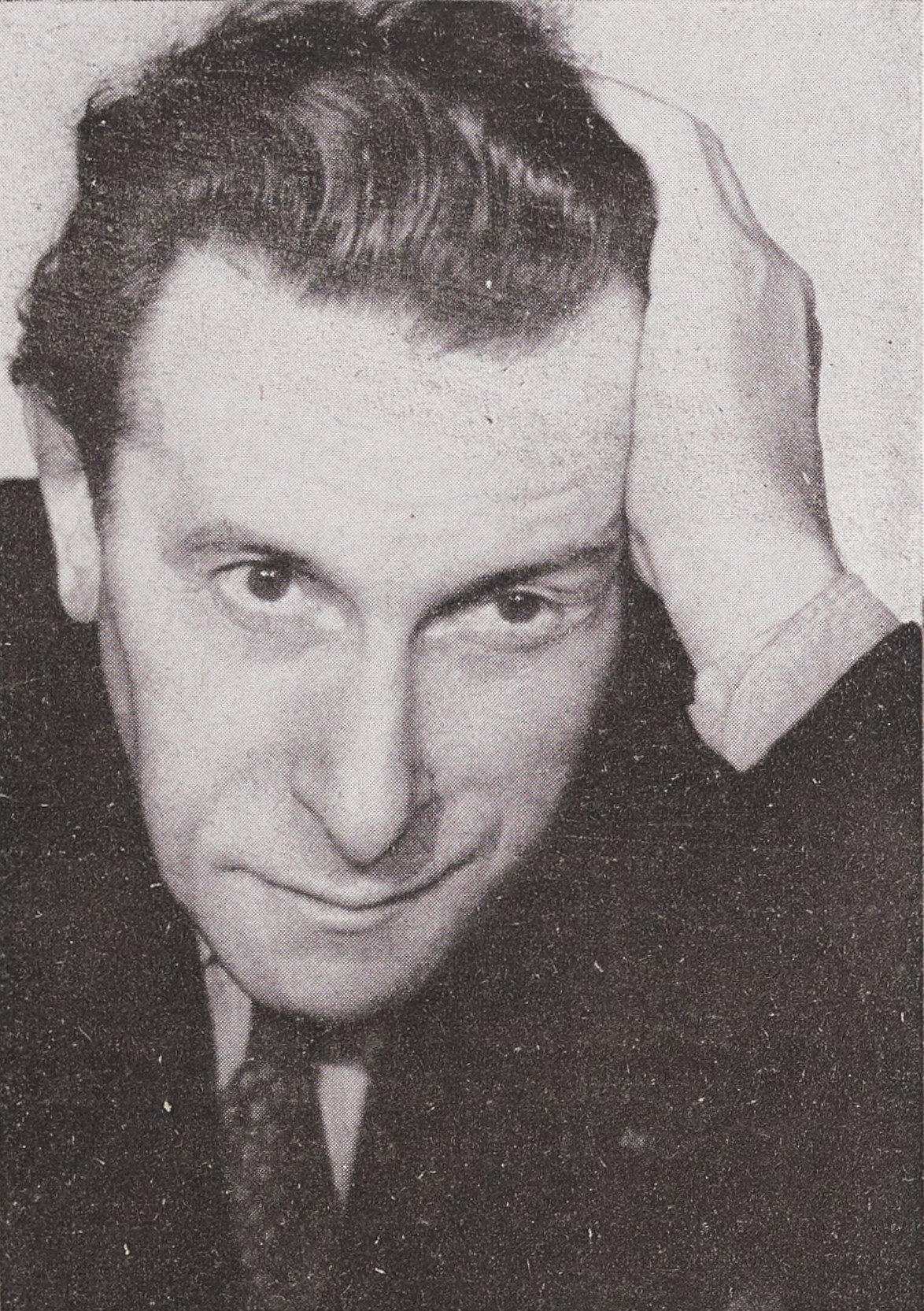
- Born: 8 May 1885; Yenne, Savoie (now France)
- Died: 11 December 1949 (aged 64); Paris, France
- Occupations: Film director, actor

Charles Dullin (French pronunciation: [ʃaʁl dylɛ̃]; 8 May 1885 – 11 December 1949) was a French actor, theater manager and director.

== Career ==
Dullin began his career as an actor in melodrama^{:185} In 1908, he started his first troupe with Saturnin Fabre, the Théâtre de Foire, where they staged works by Alexandre Arnoux.^{:185}

=== Dullin at Vieux-Colombier ===
Dullin was a student of Suzanne Bing and Jacques Copeau,^{:317} whose company he joined in 1913 for one season, before rejoining from 1917 to 1918.^{:134} He also trained and worked with Jacques Rouché,^{:73} André Antoine and Firmin Gémier.

In June 1920, Dullin began taking on students and was giving acting lessons at the Théâtre Antoine under the tutelage of Gémier.^{:111}

=== Théâtre de l'Atelier ===
In July 1921, Dullin founded Théâtre de l'Atelier which he referred to as a "laboratory theater".^{:346} He conducted auditions for the troupe in Paris, and then brought the small group of actors to Néronville, where they trained for between ten and twelve hours daily. The small group of students, among them Antonin Artaud and Marguerite Jamois, was organised as a commune, with Dullin looking to create 'a different attitude toward theatre' through a 'common sharing of life and work'.

In 1922, the group established itself in the Théâtre Montmartre, the 'first purpose built theatre in suburban Paris', which originally opened in 1822.^{:31} In order to cover the initial cost of leasing and setting up the theatre, Dullin's mother sold some of the family's furniture and silverware at pawn shops.^{:36;}^{:45}

In 1941 he moved to the 'larger, more modern Théâtre Sarah-Bernhardt', where he remained resident until 1947 when accumulating debts forced him to close down.^{:78}

=== Work on film ===
Dullin also played many roles on the screen, and used some of the money earned in these roles to support his theater. He was one of the major French actors both on the stage and the screen during the 1930s.

== Acting theory and techniques ==
Dullin put a particular emphasis on mime, gymnastics, voice production, and various improvisational exercises intended to heighten one's sensory perception.^{:119} In the tradition of Copeau, Dullin emphasised respect for the text, a simplified stage décor and a poetic rather than a spectacular perspective on the mise-en-scène, placing the actor at the center of the performance.^{:76} He aimed to create a total theatre in which the world of the stage was 'more expressive than reality'.

The goal of Dullin's training was to create the "complete actor":

to form actors with a general culture, which they so often lack; to inculcate them from the very beginning with solid principles of actors' techniques: good diction, physical training; to expand their means of expression to include dance and pantomime; in one word, to form the complete actor.

The actor was to get in tune with "La Voix du Monde" (the voice of the world) by making contact with one's surroundings, which would free the actor's true voice, "Voix de Soi-Même" (the voice of oneself).^{:347}

In his seminars, Dullin often used improvisation, which was one of his most important techniques. He emphasized that his actors must "see before describing, hear before answering...and feel before trying to express himself", often using bells, the sound of footsteps, and masks as preparation. His actors were encouraged to forget the weight of their bodies, while using them more than their faces to express themselves, often wearing a full or half mask.

=== East Asian influences ===
Dullin drew heavily on East Asian theatre techniques, and particularly Japanese theatre,^{:135} His interest in Japanese theatre developed as early as 1916, when, as a soldier in World War 1, he performed on the frontline and declared his fellow soldier's performances to be Japanese due to their integration of dance, speech and singing into their performance.^{:134}

As a member of Jacques Rouché's Théâtre des Arts (1910-1913) he performed in Louis Laloy's Le Chagrin dans le palais de Han (1911), an adaptation of a Chinese Yuan zaju play. He would first perform in the minor role of un seigneur before taking over the role the Emperor, one of the play's two leads, for its revival in December. In addition to starring in the revival, Rouché asked Dullin to modify some aspects of the staging, which, according to Rouché, foreshadowed his ‘future tendencies towards stylisation’^{:133}

He would first witness Japanese theatre in 1930, when Tsutsui Tokujirō's troupe came to Paris.

== Death ==
Dullin died in Paris on 11 December 1949, after falling ill while on tour as an actor in Southern France.^{:90}

== Notable students ==
Students of Charles Dullin included Pascale de Boysson, Antonin Artaud, Jean-Louis Barrault,^{:29} Juozas Miltinis, Étienne Decroux, Juran Hisao and Marcel Marceau.

== Notable productions ==
=== As director ===
- Ben Jonson's Volpone
- Molière's L’Avare
- Sophocles's Antigone in the Jean Cocteau adaptation with music by Arthur Honegger
- Pirandello's The Pleasure of Honesty
- Shakespeare's Richard III.

=== As actor ===
- Âmes d'orient (1919) - Agapian
- The Secret of Rosette Lambert (1920) - Bertrand
- L'Homme qui vendit son âme au diable (1921) - Le Diable
- Le Miracle des loups (1924) - [Louis XI|Le roi Louis XI]
- Le Joueur d'échecs (1927) - [Wolfgang von Kempelen|Baron von Kempelen]
- Misdeal (1928) - Olivier Maldone
- Cagliostro (1929) - Marquis de Espada-Comte de Breteil
- Les Misérables (1934) - Thénardier
- Street of Shadows (1937) - Le colonel Mathésius
- L'Affaire du courrier de Lyon (1937) - Le témoin aveugle
- Volpone (1941) - Corbaccio
- The Chain Breaker (1941) - Esprit Mouret
- Les jeux sont faits (1947) - Le marquis
- Quai des Orfèvres (1947) - Georges Brignon
- Vagabonds imaginaires (1950) - Le récitant (segment 'Les étoiles' by Alphonse Daudet) (voice) (final film role)
