= Montmartre (1931 film) =

1931 film directed by Raymond Bernard

- Directed by: Raymond Bernard
- Written by: Raymond Bernard; Henri Duvernois (novel)
- Starring: Gaby Morlay; Line Noro; Florelle
- Music by: André Roubaud
- Production company: Pathé-Natan
- Distributed by: Pathé Consortium Cinéma
- Release date: 2 October 1931
- Running time: 115 minutes
- Country: France
- Language: French

Montmartre (French: Faubourg Montmartre) is a 1931 French drama film directed by Raymond Bernard and starring Gaby Morlay, Line Noro and Florelle. Two sisters struggle to stay above water in the poverty-stricken suburbs of Paris. It was a remake of a 1925 silent film Montmartre that had also starred Morlay.

The film's sets were designed by the art director Jacques Colombier.

== Cast ==
- Gaby Morlay as Ginette Gentilhomme
- Line Noro as Céline Gentilhomme
- Florelle as Irène
- Pauline Carton as Tante Aurélie
- Nadine Picard as Fernande
- Odette Barencey as Mme Elise
- Ketty Pierson as Louise
- Henriette Leblond as Mme Chouya-Barca
- Charles Vanel as André Marco, dit Dédé
- André Dubosc as M. Gentilhomme
- Antonin Artaud as Follestat
- Dimitri Dimitriev as L'étranger
- Sylvette Fillacier as Frangipane
- Pierre Bertin as Frédéric Charençon
- Paul Azaïs as Un client de Dédé
- Raymond Cordy as Le boulanger du village
- Robert Tourneur as Le gérant

== Bibliography ==
- Dayna Oscherwitz & MaryEllen Higgins. The A to Z of French Cinema. Scarecrow Press, 2009.
