= Live at Montmartre =

Live at Montmartre may refer to the following albums recorded at the Jazzhus Montmartre:

- Live at Montmartre (Jackie McLean album) (SteepleChase, 1972)
- Live at Montmartre (Stan Getz album) (SteepleChase, 1977)
- Live at Montmartre (George Adams and Don Pullen album) (Timeless, 1978)
