= Raymond Bernard (filmmaker) =

French film director and screenwriter

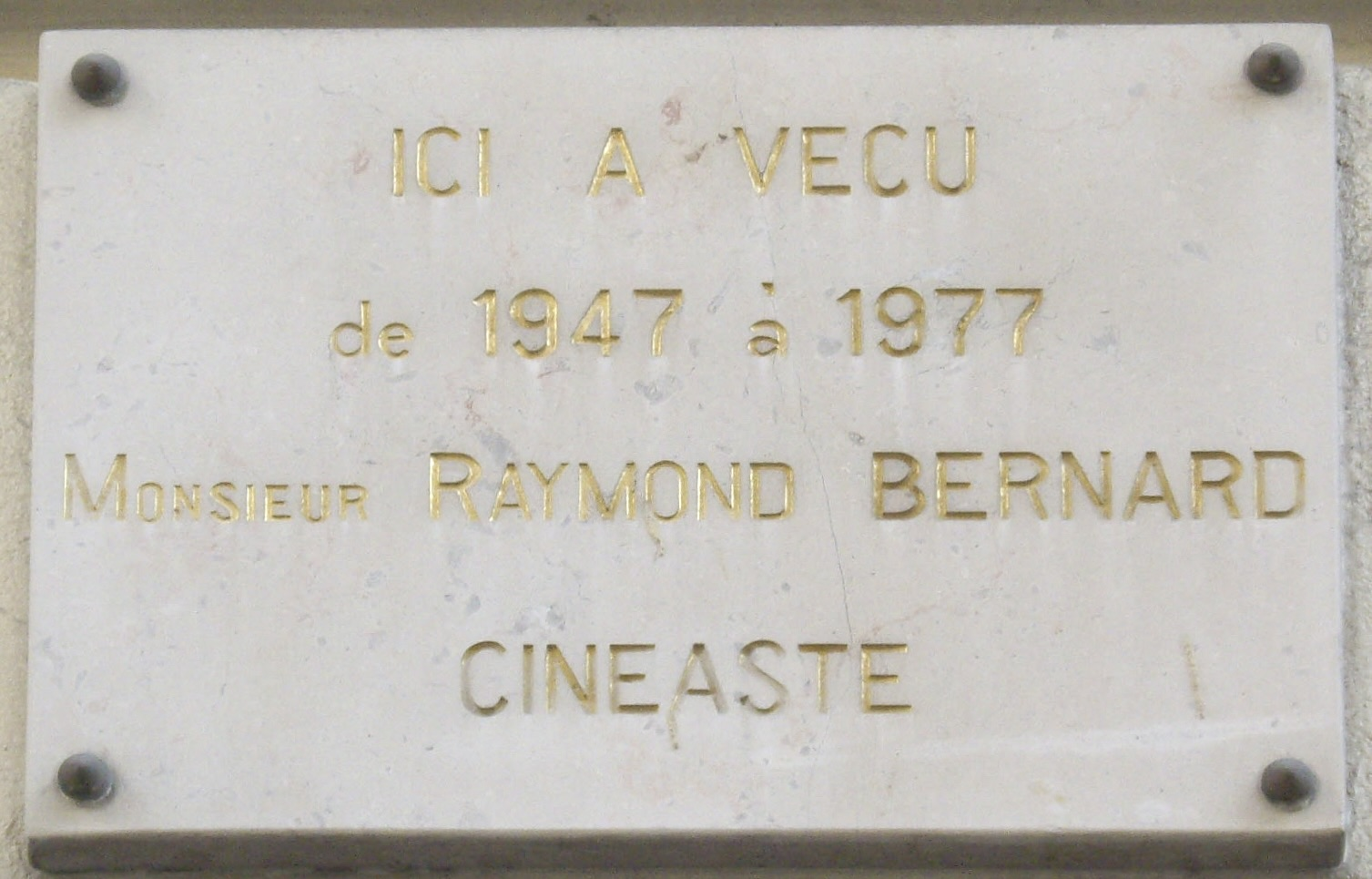
- Plaque Raymond Bernard, 55 rue Pergolèse, Paris 16
- Born: 10 October 1891; Paris, France
- Died: 12 December 1977 (aged 86); Paris, France
- Occupations: Film director, screenwriter and actor

Raymond Bernard (10 October 1891 – 12 December 1977) was a French film director and screenwriter whose career spanned more than 40 years. He is best remembered for several large-scale historical productions, including the silent films Le Miracle des loups (The Miracle of the Wolves) and Le Joueur d'échecs (The Chess Player) and in the 1930s Les Croix de bois (Wooden Crosses) and a highly regarded adaptation of Les Misérables.

== Biography ==
Raymond Bernard was born in Paris in 1891, the son of the author and humorist Tristan Bernard and younger brother of the playwright Jean-Jacques Bernard. He began his career as an actor, appearing on stage in plays written by his father, including Jeanne Doré (1913) alongside Sarah Bernhardt (also filmed in 1916). In 1917, Bernard started working behind the camera as an assistant to Jacques Feyder at Gaumont, later continuing as a director, principally adapting plays written by his father. In these popular entertainments, he soon gained experience working with leading performers such as Max Linder and Charles Dullin.

In 1924, Bernard embarked upon a new style of film, the historical spectacle, with Le Miracle des loups set in 15th-century France in the reign of Louis XI. This proved to be the most expensive film of its day and one of the more profitable. Bernard's ability to combine dramatic narrative with spacious settings and large numbers of performers was utilised in the two remaining productions of his silent film career, Le Joueur d'échecs (1927) and Tarakanova (1930).

Bernard's film-making in the sound era continued for nearly three decades. Further large-scale productions included his film about the First World War, Les Croix de bois (1932), and a three-part adaptation of Victor Hugo's Les Misérables (1934), which was nearly five hours in length. In his later films, he returned to modest projects and budgets, including a number of sophisticated comedies. During the wartime Occupation of France, Bernard, as a Jew, was obliged to remain in hiding, and his film-making ceased until the end of the war.

He retired from film-making in 1958, but in the 1970s, when he was in his 80s, he was able to supervise the reconstruction of Les Misérables, which had been severely truncated in the 1940s for easier distribution. In 1977, shortly after the broadcast of a nearly complete version on French television, Bernard died at age 86.

Raymond Bernard was an Officer of the Legion of Honour.

== Filmography (as director) ==
- Le Ravin sans fond (1917) (co-directed with Jacques Feyder)
- Le Traitement du hoquet (1917)
- Le Gentilhomme commerçant (1918)
- Le Petit Café (1919) (The Little Café)
- Le Secret de Rosette Lambert (1920) (The Secret of Rosette Lambert)
- La Maison vide (1921)
- Triplepatte (1922)
- L'Homme inusable (1923)
- Grandeur et Décadence (1923)
- Le Costaud des Épinettes (1923)
- Le Miracle des loups (1924) (The Miracle of the Wolves)
- Le Joueur d'échecs (1927) (The Chess Player)
- Tarakanova (1930)
- Faubourg Montmartre (1931) (Montmartre)
- Les Croix de bois (1932) (Wooden Crosses)
- Les Misérables (1934)
- Tartarin de Tarascon (1934) (Tartarin of Tarascon)
- Amants et Voleurs (1935) (Lovers and Thieves)
- Anne-Marie (1936)
- Le Coupable (1937) (Culprit)
- Marthe Richard, au service de la France (1937)
- J'étais une aventurière (1938) (I Was an Adventuress)
- Les Otages (1939) (The Mayor's Dilemma)
- Cavalcade d'amour (1940) (Love Cavalcade)
- Un ami viendra ce soir (1946) (A Friend Will Come Tonight)
- Adieu chérie (1946) (Goodbye Darling)
- Maya (1949)
- Le Cap de l'espérance (1951) (The Cape of Hope)
- Le Jugement de Dieu (1952) (Judgement of God)
- La Dame aux camélias (1953) (Lady of the Camelias)
- La Belle de Cadix (1953) (The Beauty of Cadiz)
- Les Fruits de l'été (1955) (Fruits of Summer)
- Le Septième Commandement (1957) (The Seventh Commandment)
- Le Septième Ciel (1958) (1958) (Seventh Heaven)
