= Charles Burguet =

French director

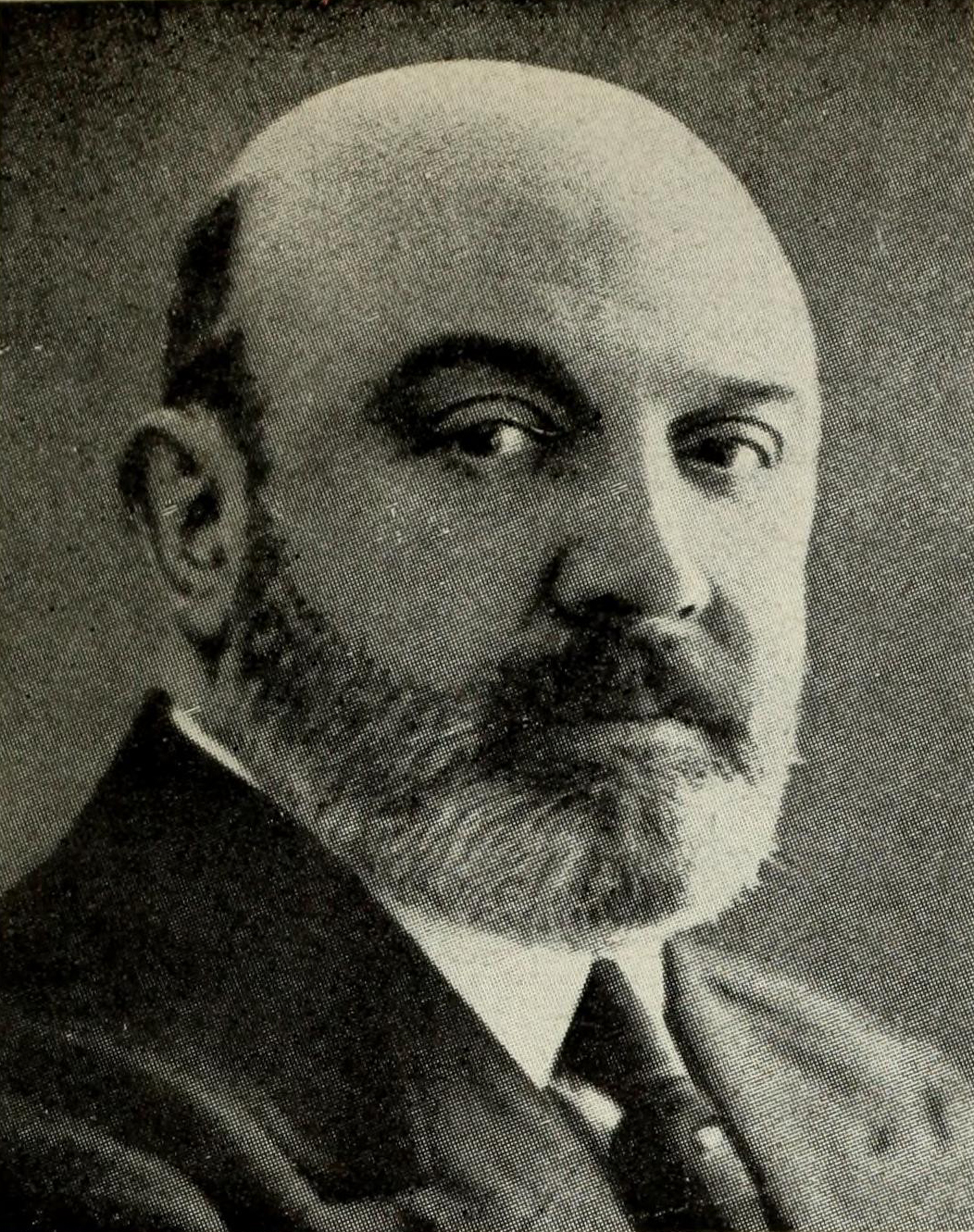
- Born: Charles Henry Lévy; 26 May 1878; Paris, France
- Died: 9 June 1946 (aged 68); Le Kremlin-Bicêtre, France
- Occupation(s): Film director, screenwriter
- Years active: 1912–1929

Charles Burguet (26 May 1878 – 9 June 1946) was a French director best known for his silent films of the late 1910s and early 1920s.

He directed well over 30 films between 1912 and 1929.

== Selected filmography ==
- The Mysteries of Paris (1922)
- Montmartre (1925)
- Barocco (1925)
- Martyr (1927)
- The Veil Dancer (1929)

== Bibliography ==
- Sante, Lucy (2015). The Other Paris. New York: Farrar, Straus and Giroux. ISBN 978-1-4299-4458-8.
