= Gilbert Dalleu =

French actor

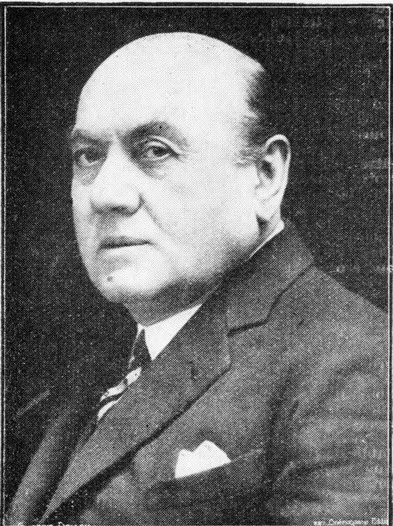
- Born: 5 March 1861; Saint-Pont, France
- Died: 1 March 1930 (aged 68)
- Occupation: Actor
- Years active: 1910-1928 (film)

Gilbert Dalleu (5 March 1861 – 1 March 1931) was a French stage and film actor from Saint-Pont.

== Biography ==
Gilbert Dalleu was born in Saint-Pont, France on 5 March 1861. Growing up, his parents wanted to send him to l’Ecole des Arts et Métiers to train to be an engineer, but he was disinterested in the idea. At seventeen, he was hired by the then-director of the theater L’Espérance on Avenue de Cichy. His first role was that of a chambermaid, as all other roles had already been filled for their production. Not long after, he went on an eight-month tour with Agar, passing through the major cities of France. In 1888 the tour ended and he returned to Paris to play d’Artagan in Jeunesse des Mousquetaires at the Ambigu theater. In 1889 he was cast as Laroque in Roger-La-Honte, and starred in a few other shows. He left again in 1891 to tour South America and the United States performing l'Enfant Prodigue in the role of Peirrot. He eventually returned and performed a series of shows before leaving again to tour the major cities of Europe. He would continue performing until 1909 when he was made the administrator of the Cigale theater. He was bored of this by the following year, however, and so accepted an offer from Ambigu theater to help with a production based on Bagne d’Enfants by André de Lorde and Pierre Chain.

While working on this project, he was approached by Lucien Longuet who begged him to appear on film. Having been convinced, Dalleu made an appointment for that December. He starred in two films on his first day, and went on to star in many more. In 1911 he was brought on to star in Zigomar by Victorin-Hippolyte Jasset.

In 1914, he was recalled to London on account of the outbreak of World War I where he gave a series of 150 performances of l’Enfant Prodigue and other shows. After the war, he was called back to Film d’Art to complete The Count of Monte Cristo where he played Caderousse.

In September 1928, Dalleu was on his way back from shooting scenes for Gardiens de Phare when his car swerved and flipped. He was the only one injured, but he ultimately had to have his right arm amputated.

== Selected Filmography ==
- Zigomar
- Le Poison d’Humanité
- La Petite Chocolatière
