= Henry Dupuy-Mazuel =

French author (1885–1962)

Henry Dupuy-Mazuel (17 May 1885 – 23 April 1962) was a French author. He wrote plays and novels, employing the pseudonym Henry Catalan for his Soeur Angèle detective novels. Some of his work was adapted to films.

Sociéte des Films Historiques contracted for him to write an account of The Turk, an automaton chess player, and funded theatrical and cinematic adaptations.

He was co-director of Monde Illustré.

== Writings ==
- L'Homme Riche (1919)
- Le Jouer de'échecs (1926)
- Le chant de l'alouette (1932)
- Soeur Angele and the Ghosts of Chambord Sheed & Ward
- Le miracle des loups Albin Michel (1924) (Miracle of the Wolves)
- Royoez, tambours!, co-author
- Les Gardiens Anges
- Match de Boxe; Comedie En Trois Actes by Jean-Jose Frappa and Henry Dupuy-Mazuel
- Molière, play
- Jeanne de Reims

== Filmography ==
- The Miracle of the Wolves (1924)
- The Chess Player (1927)
- Le Tournoi (1928)
- Chansons de Paris (1934), Songs of Paris
- The Chess Player (1938), a remake of the 1927 film
- Le miracle des loups (1961)
