= Zigomar the Eelskin =

1913 French silent film

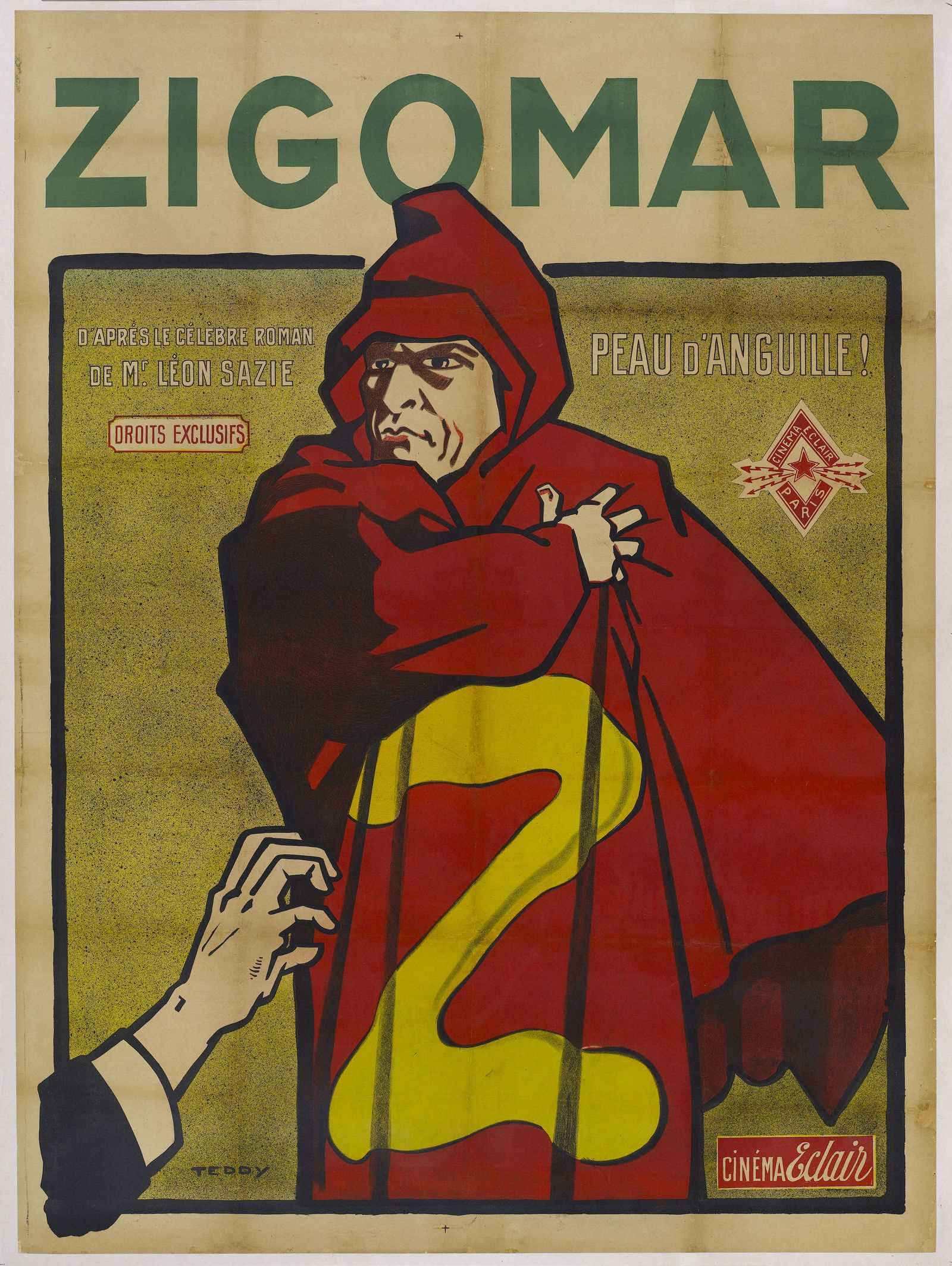
- Directed by: Victorin-Hippolyte Jasset
- Written by: Victorin-Hippolyte Jasset; Léon Sazie
- Produced by: Éclair
- Starring: Alexandre C. Arquillière; André Liabel; Josette Andriot; Atillio Maffel; Camille Bardou; Henri Gouget; Maryse Dauvray
- Production company: Epinay Studios
- Release date: March 21, 1913
- Running time: 2825 Feet
- Country: France
- Language: French
- Budget: $25,000

Zigomar the Eelskin (French: Zigomar Peau d'Anguille) (Also known as Zigomar the Black Scourge) is a 1913 French crime drama silent film directed by Victorin-Hippolyte Jasset and produced by Éclair. It was the third movie made by Jasset that used the character of Zigomar (who was originally created by the author Léon Sazie in 1909), and the second sequel to Zigomar, and comes after Zigomar Against Nick Carter in the series. The story is an adaptation of a story of the same name that was published in the French newspaper Le Matin from June 30-August 26, 1912. The film follows Paulin Broquet, the chief of police, as he struggles to recapture the escaped crime lord Zigomar and his ally, La Rosaria. The cast consists of Alexandre C. Arquillière as Zigomar, André Liabel as Paulin Broquet, and Josette Andriot as La Rosaria. The movie was split into the three parts: The Resurrection of Zigomar (La Résurrection de Zigomar), The Elephant Burglar (L’Eléphant cambrioleur), and The Air Brigand (Le Brigand de l’air).

== Plot ==
Taking place after Zigomar contre Nick Carter, Zigomar is taken to a medical examiner for an autopsy after having poisoned himself at the end of the previous film. Before they start, Paulin Broquet requests a sample of Zigomar's arm skin to make into a card sleeve. However, the examiner is attacked by La Rosaria who then gives Zigomar the antidote to the poison and helps him escape through the window. Shortly after, Paulin Broquet is lured into a trap and brought before Zigomar, who offers him a generous £50,000 if he leaves him to pursue his criminal activities freely. Paulin refuses, and is put inside of a cage as Zigomar and La Rosaria leave to plan their next heist. Luckily, however, his lieutenant finds out where he is being held and frees the police chief. Meanwhile, Zigomar and La Rosaria have launched their plan, stealing a safe full of money won from the lottery with the help of a circus elephant. They almost escape into the sewers, but the ground gives way beneath the two and they barely escape the collapse, but lose the safe in the process. By now, the others at the carnival have become aware of the attempted theft, and have reported it to Paulin, who disguises himself as a circus attendant and begins working undercover. He eventually hears an incriminating conversation between Zigomar and his accomplice and attempts to accost the duo. However, they quickly disguise themselves as Romani people and duck into a parade, successfully escaping once again. Next Paulin discovers that Zigomar and his Gang of Z have moved to Italy, where they plan to rob a banker. He tries to warn the banker ahead of time, but Zigomar finds out before he arrives, and plans to blow up the mountain railway he would be travelling on. Paulin is alerted to the danger by his assistant, however, and goes by boat instead. The bomb is then retrieved before it goes off, avoiding an unnecessary explosion. When Zigomar finds out about this change, he decides enough is enough and forces an aviator at gunpoint to fly him over Broquet’s boat. Once overhead, he drops bombs onto the boat which cause the engine to fail. Paulin is not killed, however, and manages to warn the banker ahead of time despite the setback. The banker, however, already had a plan in case of a situation such as this, and shows Broquet that his safe is trapped, and when Zigomar and his gang try to open it, it triggers. The trap floods the room with water, and everyone is arrested. In court, Zigomar is sentenced to penal servitude, a sentence which puts a mysterious smile on the criminal's face.

== Cast ==
- Alexandre C. Arquillière (Zigomar)
- André Liabel (Paulin Broquet)
- Josette Andriot (La Rosaria)
- Atillio Maffel (The Aviator)
- Camille Bardou (Cast Member)

== Production ==
The movie was produced after Léon Sazie granted the filming rights to Éclair, and the great success of the previous two in the series. It was filmed at Epinay Studios and directed by Victorin-Hippolyte Jasset.

== Release ==
The film first premiered in Nancy, France on Friday, 21 March 1913 at Cine-Palace, and on the 23rd in the Éclair House in Cambridge, England. By 5 May of the same year it was being shown at His Majesty’s Theatre in New Zealand, and on April 5th it premiered in Colombo, Sri Lanka at Wagner’s Olympia. On the 11th, it was shown at Zorilla Theatre in Manila, Philippines. It was imported into Japan in September 1914, but due to the impact left by the first Zigomar film, it had to be released under the title The Triumph of the Detective in order to skirt around new censorship laws.

== Sazie v. Éclair ==
Although Éclair had originally been allowed to make five Zigomar films, Léon Sazie felt that Peau d’Anguille had strayed too far from the original story and sued the studio for damages and to revoke permission to make the final two films. In particular, he took issue with the scene where the elephant steals the safe from the carnival. He felt that although his stories have an element of the fantastic, this was too far. In April 1914, the Third Chamber of the Palais de Justice granted him 6,000 francs ($1200 USD) in damages after Pierre Decourcelle was called in for an expert opinion and it was confirmed that Jasset, the director, had not even read the serial. Éclair appealed the ruling and the trial was moved to the Fourth Chamber, where they lost a second time in 1919. This time, the damages were increased to 10,000 francs, and they were made to pay Sazie an additional 250 francs for any future violations.
