= Zigomar Against Nick Carter =

1912 French silent film

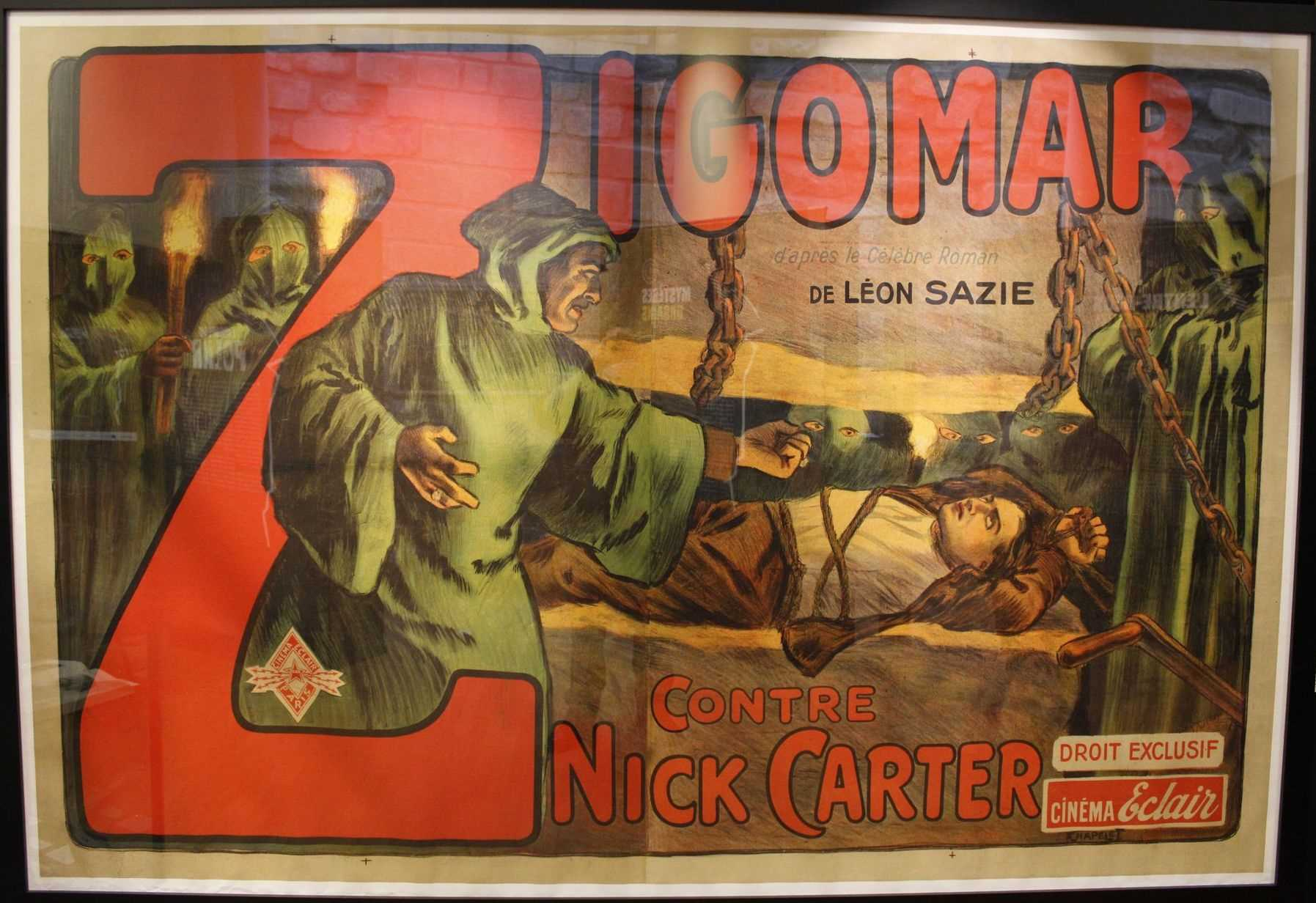
- Directed by: Victorin-Hippolyte Jasset
- Written by: Victorin-Hippolyte Jasset; Léon Sazie (novel); John Russel Coryell (novel)
- Produced by: Éclair
- Starring: Alexandre C. Arquillière; André Liabel
- Production company: Epinay Studios
- Release date: 1912
- Running time: 48 minutes, or 4000 feet of film
- Country: France
- Language: French
- Budget: ~£20,000

Zigomar Against Nick Carter (French: Zigomar contre Nick Carter), also known as Zigomar vs. Nick Carter, Zigomar vs. Le Rouquin, and Zigomar vs. Le Roukin is a 1912 French crime drama silent film directed by Victorin-Hippolyte Jasset and produced by Éclair. It was the second movie made by Jasset which used the character of Zigomar (who was originally created by the author Léon Sazie in 1909 for a newspaper serial in French newspaper Le Matin). The film is a crossover with fictional detective Nick Carter, who fills in for detective Pauline Broquet. The film follows Nick Carter, an American detective, as he tries to apprehend the titular Zigomar, King of Thieves. The movie is a sequel to Zigomar, and the cast consists of Alexandre C. Arquillière as Zigomar, André Liabel as Paulin Broquet, and Charles Krauss as Nick Carter. The movie was released on four film reels titled Zigomar Ressuscite, Les Deaux Zigomar!, Face à Face, and La Fin de Zigomar! (localized as Resurrected to Life, His Return to the Notorious Gang, The Opium Dens, and The Auto Wild Chase for the American release), and was followed up with Zigomar the Eelskin in 1913.

== Plot ==
Zigomar Against Nick Carter (1912).

Zigomar, disguised as a wood seller, hides an explosive within a log which he sells to his nemesis, the chief of police, Paulin Broquet. When the fireplace is lit, Broquet’s house explodes, and he is hospitalized. Unwilling to allow Zigomar to operate unchecked, he calls in the American detective Nick Carter to take over until he recovers.

Nick Carter is attacked by members of Zigomar’s Z Gang as he’s leaving, and is thrown down a stairway. He catches one of the bannisters on the way down, however, and is able to avoid the piano they throw after him as well. By the time he gets back up the stairs, the gangsters have put on disguises and are allowed to leave. However, Nick Carter finds a slip of paper dropped by one of them which bears the name "Olga Leontieva". Following this lead, he discovers that Olga is Zigomar’s former girlfriend, and with some persuasion she tells him that Zigomar has a secret gambling house. Nick Carter plans a raid on it, but the criminals hear he’s on his way, and as they change clothes the furniture starts moving around the room on their own as the building changes into a theatre hall. Instead of leaving, however, Nick Carter knocks out the bouncer, steals his clothes, and takes his place. When he sees Zigomar in the building, there’s a confrontation which results in Zigomar’s escape. To make things more difficult, he employs one of the members of the Z Gang as a body double, with one being indistinguishable from the other. On April 2, Zigomar attempts the robbery of Anien House while his magician accomplish distract those present, but is stopped by Nick Carter, who fails to catch him. At the same time, Zigomar robs a jeweler in Marseilles. However, a mechanism within the case which holds the jeweler’s valuables is set off by his activities, and his photo is taken. Shaken, Zigomar then flees through the window, landing in a car below and driving off. When Nick Carter hears about the robbery, he’s surprised to see Zigomar’s face in the photograph.

Zigomar’s plot involves the kidnapping of a couple rich travelers in order to hold them for a ransom of $50,000. He holds them in the D’Enfer caves, where Nick Carter finds them shortly thereafter. However, he is subdued by the Z Gang, and Zigomar sentences him to death by being slowly crushed by a large stone. He is left unattended, however, and Olga appears again in the story to free him, and brings with her a lot torch and gunpowder so they can blow up the cavernous hideout.

Once free, Nick Carter disguises himself as a member of the Z Gang and follows Zigomar to an opium den, where he finally discovers that there are two Zigomars. He flees with Zigomar giving chase, and the two take to the water. Zigomar gives up the chase eventually, and moves on to his next scheme.

From here, Zigomar visits the castle of Trunelles where he extorts $5,000 from the people there, and leaves while promising to return. Nick Carter and Olga once again catch up to him as he attempts to make his getaway, however, and a car chase ensues which results in both of them once again being captured by the Z Gang.

This time, however, they’re bound with rope and placed inside a straw hut with nothing but a fire. They are left unattended again, and Nick Carter uses the opportunity to burn the rope which binds him in order to make them weak enough to break out of. Once both of them are free, they break down one of the walls and steal a couple horses. The fire within the hut grows behind them, however, and the burning structure attracts the attention of the Gang, which give chase. Olga and Nick Carter are separated by stampeding cattle, and Nick escapes while Olga is captured. The Z Gang tie her to one of their horses and drag her for quite a while before she’s saved by peasants. Once Nick Carter is reunited with her, he puts in the newspapers a fake obituary for himself. Zigomar reads it and believes it to be true, but is arrested amid the Gang’s celebration. At the police department, Zigomar pretends to faint and, when an attendant comes with smelling salts to rouse him, he drinks them and dies before he could ever see justice.

== Cast ==
- Alexandre C. Arquillière (Zigomar)
- André Liabel (Paulin Broquet)
- Charles Krauss (Nick Carter)
- Olga Demidova (Olga Leontieva)
- Josette Androit (La Rosaria)
- Camille Bardou
- Paul Guidé
- Émile Keppens
- Maryse Dauvray
- Camille Bardou
- Léon Durac

== Production ==
The movie was produced after Léon Sazie granted Éclair the film rights to Zigomar. Much of the main cast was carried over from Sazie’s original picks for the previous film, Zigomar.

== Release ==
The film was released in France in March 1912 as Zigomar contre Nick Carter, and later had various releases abroad. These included releases in the Netherlands as De bende van Z., Germany as Zigomar contra Nick Carter, Italy as Zigomar contro Nick Carter, America as Zigomar vs. LeRoquin and The Phantom Bandit, in London as Zigomar v. Nick Carter on March 24. From 14–17 March 1912, the film was shown at Ideal Cinema in Manila under the English title Zigomar vs. Nick Carter.

On 1 May 1912 the film premiered in Japan. On the 6th, it premiered in New Zealand at the Fullers’ Pictures Skating Rink.

== Reception ==
The Chickasha Daily Express said Zigomar Against Nick Carter is "the most sensational and awe inspiring photoplay ever thrown on a picture screen."

== Adaptations ==
After the film came out, there was a stage adaptation of the film that was being performed by the Spanish Rambal troupe in Madrid titled ‘’Zigomar contra Nick-Carter’’. In 1918, the script was published as a part of the series ‘’La Comedia Policíaca’’. The plot was changed significantly, with the inciting incident being Zigomar’s escape from jail rather than the bombing of Paulin Broquet’s house and several new characters.
