= Nick Carter, le roi des détectives =

- Directed by: Victorin-Hippolyte Jasset
- Written by: Georges Hatot
- Produced by: Éclair
- Starring: Pierre Bressol
- Release date: 1908
- Running time: 6 episodes
- Country: France
- Language: Silent film

Nick Carter, le roi des détectives (1908) is a French silent serial film based on the popular American novels featuring master detective Nick Carter. It was written by Georges Hatot and directed by Victorin-Hippolyte Jasset for the Éclair company. It was released in six episodes, each of which told a complete story, but their release was timed at approximately fortnightly intervals to create a sense of continuity with the audience. The stories were set in Paris.

== Episodes ==
The episodes and their release dates were as follows:

- Part 1. Le Guet-Apens (The Doctor's Rescue). 8 September 1908.
- Part 2. L'Affaire des bijoux (The Jewel Affair). 22 September 1908.
- Part 3. Les Faux Monnayeurs (False Coiners). 6 October 1908.
- Part 4. Les Dévaliseurs de banque (The Bank Burglar). 20 October 1908.
- Part 5. Les Empreintes (The Imprints). 27 October 1908.
- Part 6. Les Bandits en noir (The Bandits in Evening Dress). 15 November 1908.

The success of the film led the company to make further Nick Carter adaptations in the following years, and there were also imitations made by other companies.
