= Into the Foothills =

1914 film

- Directed by: Webster Cullison
- Written by: Webster Cullison
- Starring: Edna Payne; Jack W. Johnston; Lucie K. Villa
- Production company: Eclair Film Company
- Distributed by: Universal Film Manufacturing Company
- Release date: March 11, 1914
- Running time: Two reels
- Country: United States
- Languages: Silent; English intertitles

Into the Foothills (1914) is an American short (two-reel) silent Western film. It was written and directed by Webster Cullison and filmed on location in Tucson, Arizona in December 1913. The movie is believed to be lost.

== Plot ==
The story is of a gold claim stolen and recovered. The dramatic apex of the film featured two men and a girl defending themselves against an attack by an intoxicated Mexican soldiers until they are rescued by United States Troopers. The hero of the drama, a young prospector discovers a gold mine but is shot by the father of the girl he loves. He recovers both his health and his mine which the villain was working to steal. In the end, he marries the heroine.

The Moving Picture World provided a synopsis from 1914:

Steve Brady, a young prospector, and his three pals search in vain for months among the foothills for a vein of gold that will make them rich. Steve, while stumbling through the underbrush one day, trips, and, in throwing out his hand to save himself, accidentally strikes a rich lode. Overjoyed at his discovery he starts for town for some supplies and on the way he meets Barker, a villainous old miner, who is starting off with his wife and beautiful daughter, Ruth, to prospect. Steve tells him of the find. Barker plies him with whiskey until he is drunk and then strikes him over the bead with the empty bottle. He is about to kill Steve, but his wife interferes only to be brutally beaten, and he desists only when his daughter threatens to shoot him. Steve gains his senses and staggers away. Barker sends a shot after him, wounding him in the arm. Barker and his family then move on and he accidentally stumbles across Steve's shack. Fearing the wrath of the rangers he deserts Ruth and her.

== Cast ==
- Edna Payne as Ruth Barker
- Jack W. Johnston as Steve Brady
- Lucie K. Villa as Mrs. Barker
