= Hargnies =

Hargnies may refer to the following places in France:

- Hargnies, Ardennes, a commune in the Ardennes department
- Hargnies, Nord, a commune in the Nord department
