= Anchamps =

- Commune
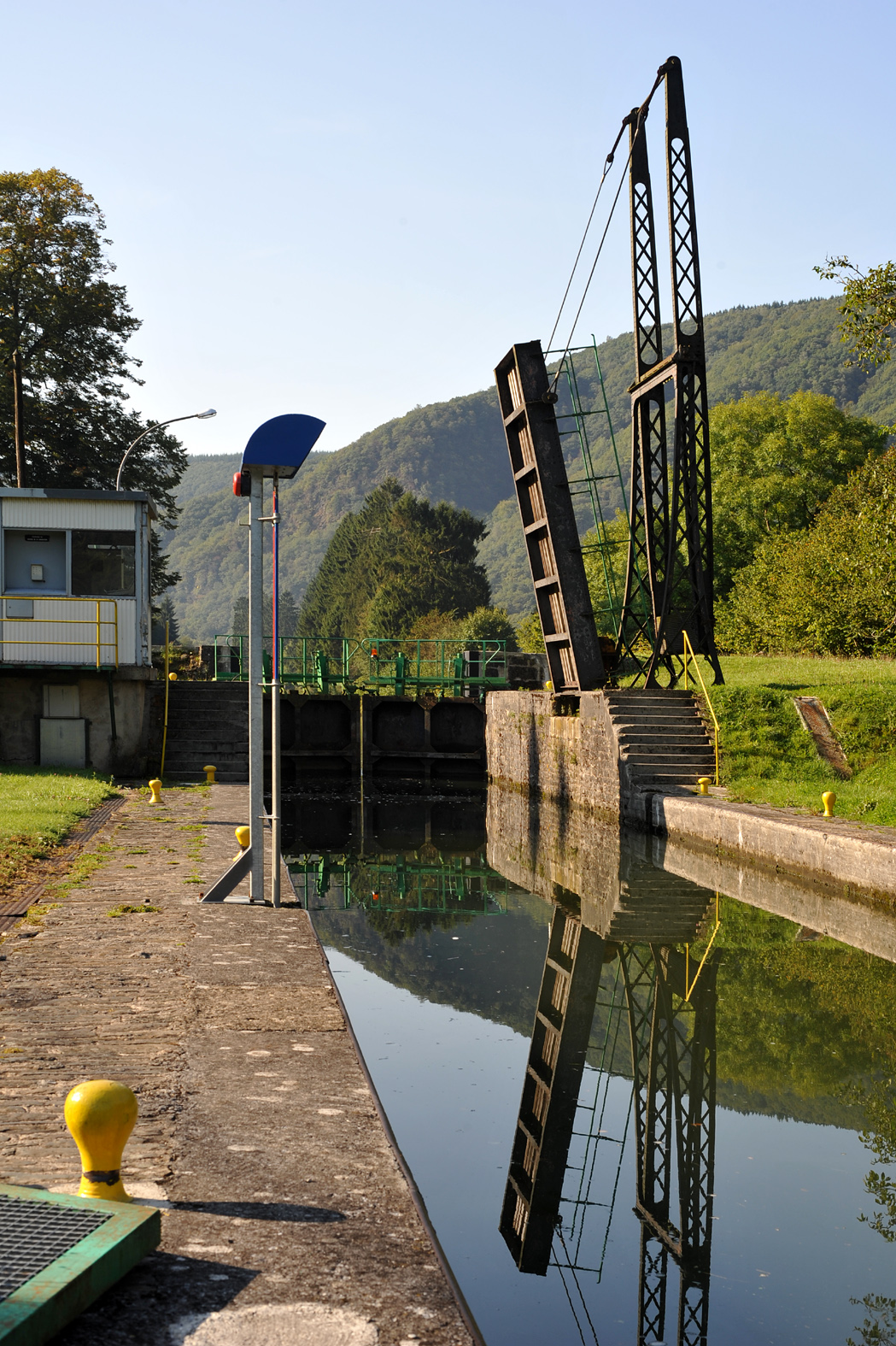
- Bridge at the Lock at Anchamps

- Coat of arms
- Location of Anchamps
- Location within France Location within Grand Est
- Coordinates: 49°55′56″N 4°40′34″E
- Country: France
- Region: Grand Est
- Department: Ardennes
- Arrondissement: Charleville-Mézières
- Canton: Revin
- Intercommunality: Ardenne-Rives-de-Meuse

Government
  - Mayor (2020–2026): Michel Colcy
- Area^{1}: 2.26 km^{2} (0.87 sq mi)
- Elevation: 140 m (460 ft)
- Highest elevation: 345 m (1,132 ft)
- Lowest elevation: 127 m (417 ft)
- Population (2023): 216
  - Density: 95.6/km^{2} (248/sq mi)
- Time zone: UTC+01:00 (CET)
  - Summer (DST): UTC+02:00 (CEST)
- INSEE/Postal code: 08011 /08500
- ^{1} French Land Register data, which excludes lakes, ponds, glaciers > 1 km^{2} (0.386 sq mi or 247 acres) and river estuaries.

Anchamps (French pronunciation: [ɑ̃ʃɑ̃]) is a commune in the Ardennes department in the Grand Est region of northern France.

== Geography ==
Anchamps is about 15 kilometres (9.3 mi) south of Fumay and 12 kilometres (7.5 mi) east of Rocroi on the left bank of the Meuse just east of the Orzy neighbourhood of Revin. Road access to the town is by a local road from Revin which follows the bank of the Meuse and a road bridge over the Meuse connects to the D1 road. The village is served by the TER train from Givet to Charleville-Mézières four or five times per day. The railway also follows the Meuse crossing over on the railway viaduct on the east side of the commune.

The Meuse river forms the border of the commune on the west, north, and east sides.

=== Toponymy ===
- Angehan (1400)
- Engehan (1459)
- Auchamp (1793)
- Amchamps (1801)

According to JP Lépine, Anchamps was once written Enjean and Enchamp.

It probably derives from anacum: an meaning "river" and acum meaning "close" – i.e. "close to the river".

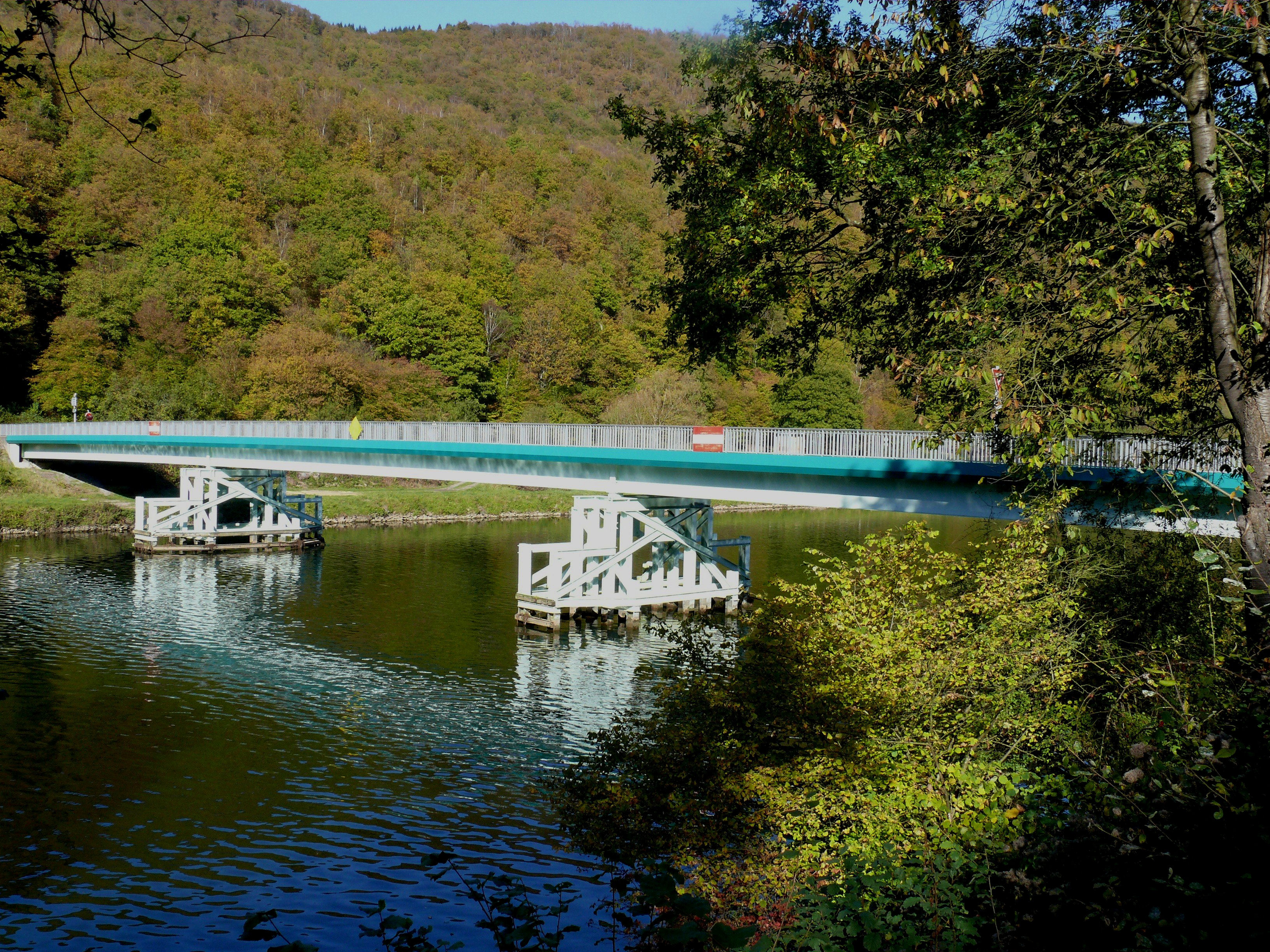
Road bridge over the Meuse giving access to Anchamps from the D1

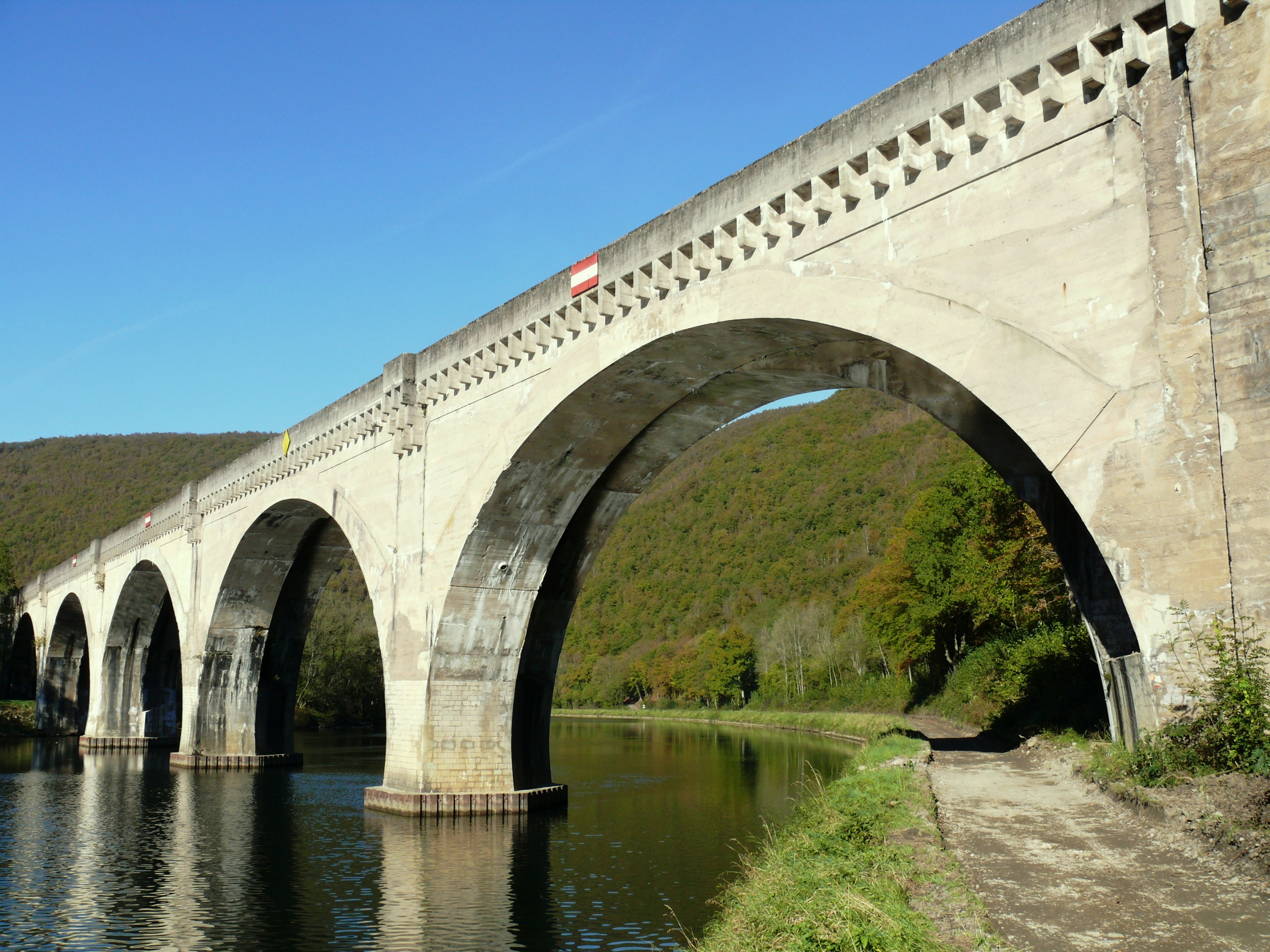
Railway viaduct over the Meuse between Anchamps and Laifour

== History ==
In 1509 the village had only 12 fires, in 1728 – 18, and in 1846–59 fires or 235 inhabitants.

The origin of the village is unknown: it is as old as the village of Deville which has long depended on the Barony of Montcornet.

The inhabitants of Anchamps, like all communes from the Barony of Montcornet had to pay annual manorial dues which was two hens for each citizen; 18 deniers for the rights of the people; for the use of the river water for crushing (there used to be a crushing mill) 3 livres and 5 sols; 2 Paris sols and 6 eels for fishing the Meuse; 2 sols and 6 deniers per swathe of meadow; and 9 deniers per arpent of occupied land.

Following a charter dated 3 August and 27 July 1546, Charles de Croy gave the inhabitants of this village, and the villages of Deville, Laifour Secheval, and Mazures an extensive wood called Wèbes.

The Lordship of Anchamps was sold to César Bernier in 1578 and was reunited with the County of Lonny in 1663 with all manorial rights attached. On the sale and acquisition of the marquisate by the Duke of Meillaraie in 1674, the rights granted to the residents by Charles de Croy were retained and that purchaser even provided them forever by deed of 22 September 1679 with the responsibility to pay him 15 sols per arpent annually.

The last lord of this place was Louis-Marie-Charles, the Viscount of Salse, a knight and also Lord of Laifour.

The village church dates from 1766.

== Administration ==
List of mayors

From	To	Name
1995	2007	Jean Gugole
2007	2007	Valérie Gugole
2007	2020	Michel Philippe
2020	Current	Michel Colcy

== Population ==
Historical population
Year	Pop.	±% p.a.
1968	182	—
1975	177	−0.40%
1982	199	+1.69%
1990	204	+0.31%
1999	192	−0.67%
2007	226	+2.06%
2012	232	+0.53%
2017	217	−1.33%
2023	216	−0.08%
Source: INSEE

== Sites and monuments ==
=== Pierre Roland ===
This site consists of two blocks of diorite. The first is called Pierre Roland and has the shape of an irregular pyramid. It rises to 1.4 metres (4 ft 7 in) above ground and is probably buried 50 cm. Its four edges are said to align with sunrises and sunsets. The other lies 10 m to the northwest and measures 1.77 x 0.67 x 0.37 m. These stones are said to have been thrown by Satan from three rocks called the Ladies of Meuse at the famous Charlemagne's nephew, Roland, to force him to retreat. One of the three projectiles rolled into the Meuse, the other two landed at the feet of the hero.

== See also ==
- Communes of the Ardennes department
