= The Old Doctor's Humanity =

- Produced by: Eclair American
- Starring: Will E. Sheerer
- Distributed by: Universal Film Manufacturing Company
- Release date: October 1, 1912
- Running time: 1 reel
- Country: USA
- Language: Silent.. English

The Old Doctor's Humanity is a 1912 silent film short produced by the Éclair American Company and distributed by the Universal Film Manufacturing Company.

A copy is preserved in the Library of Congress.

== Cast ==
- Will E. Sheerer
