= Germaine Dermoz =

French actress (1888–1966)

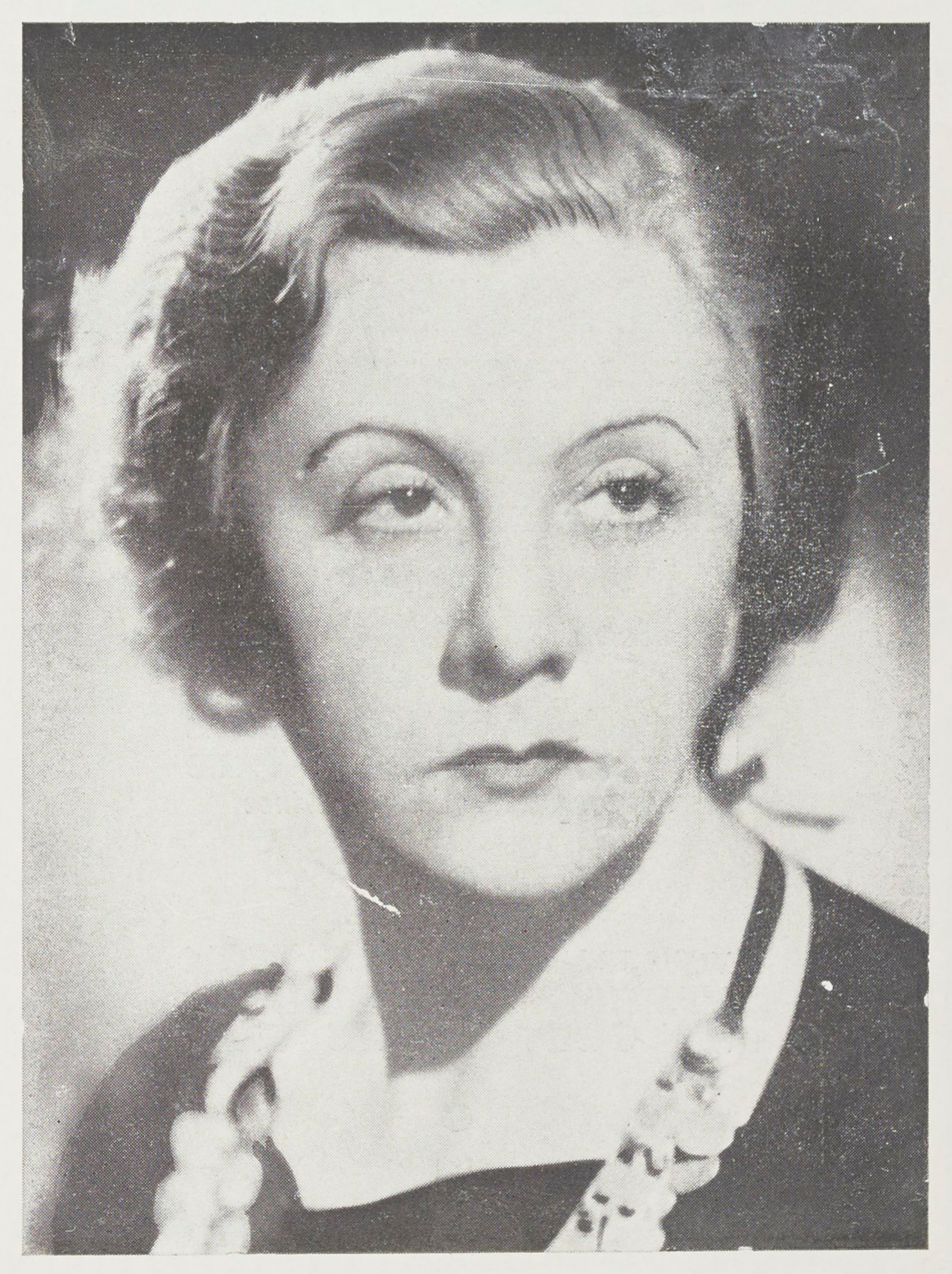
- Born: 30 July 1888; 1st arrondissement of Paris, France
- Died: 6 November 1966; 5th arrondissement of Paris, France
- Occupation: Actress

Germaine Dermoz (born Germaine Deluermoz; 30 July 1888 – 6 November 1966) was a French film and theatre actress of the early-to-mid twentieth century.

She performed in over twenty theatre productions, frequently in the Théâtre Réjane. Her film career took place mostly during the silent movie era. She is most famous for her portrayal of Madame Beudet in The Smiling Madame Beudet.

She had an older sister, actress Jeanne Delvair née Duluermoz (1877–1949), and a younger brother, Henri Deluermoz (1876–1943), who was a painter.

== Filmography ==
- 1908 : Méprise
- 1908 : L'Amour qui tue
- 1909 : The Dragoons Under Louis XIV
- 1909 : The Dragonad
- 1909 : Les Chasseurs de fourrures
- 1909 : The Death of the Duke D'Enghien
- 1909 : Beethoven
- 1909 : La Fin d'un tyran
- 1909 : Madame de Langeais
- 1909 : The Duchess of Langeais
- 1910 : Barberine
- 1910 : Eugénie Grandet
- 1910 : L'Étranger
- 1910 : King Phillip the Fair and the Templars
- 1910 : Caïn
- 1911 : The Last Days of King Henry II of France
- 1911 : Olivier Cromwell
- 1911 : Milton
- 1911 : Le Rideau noir
- 1911 : La Nouvelle Servante
- 1911 : L'Assassinat de Henri III
- 1912 : Le Mystère du pont Notre-Dame
- 1912 : Les Trois Sultanes
- 1912 : Parmi les pierres
- 1912 : The Forger
- 1912 : La Joie qui tue
- 1913 : Little Jack
- 1913 : Le Ruisseau
- 1913 : Zaza
- 1913 : De afwezige
- 1913 : Harding's Heritage
- 1914 : Les Habits noirs
- 1914 : La Tache
- 1918 : Le Masque d'amour
- 1918 : La Marâtre
- 1918 : L'Énigme
- 1919 : Fanny Lear
- 1920 : Five Doomed Gentlemen
- 1920 : Petit ange
- 1921 : Les Naufragés du sort
- 1923 : The Smiling Madame Beudet
- 1925 : La Course du flambeau
- 1930 : L'Arlésienne
- 1930 : The Dream
- 1931 : Le Bal
- 1932 : Le Crime du chemin rouge
- 1933 : Bagnes d'enfants
- 1934 : The Bread Peddler
- 1934 : Moscow Nights
- 1937 : The Dark Angels
- 1938 : Heroes of the Marne
- 1938 : Remontons les Champs-Élysées
- 1940 : La vie est magnifique
- 1942 : Andorra ou les hommes d'Airain
- 1943 : Monsieur des Lourdines
- 1947 : Monsieur Vincent
- 1948 : The Murdered Model
- 1950 : The Prize
- 1952 : Carrot Top
- 1952 : The Red Head
- 1953 : Children of Love
- 1955 : Caroline and the Rebels
- 1956 : If Paris Were Told to Us
- 1956 : The Width of the Pavement
- 1963 : The Reluctant Spy

== Theatre ==
- 1907 : La Course du flambeau by Paul Hervieu, Théâtre Réjane.
- 1907 : Raffles by Ernest William Hornung and Eugene Wiley Presbrey, Théâtre Réjane.
- 1907 : Après le pardon by Mathilde Sérao and Pierre Decourcelle, Théâtre Réjane.
- 1908 : L'Impératrice by Catulle Mendès, Théâtre Réjane.
- 1908 : Qui perd gagne by Pierre Veber and Alfred Capus, Théâtre Réjane.
- 1908 : Trains de luxe by Abel Hermant, Théâtre Réjane.
- 1909 : Madame Margot by Émile Moreau and Charles Clairville, Théâtre Réjane.
- 1913 : Le Phalène by Henry Bataille, Théâtre du Vaudeville.
- 1920 : Le Règne de Messaline by Armand Bour, Théâtre des Variétés.
- 1920 : Le Simoun by Henri-René Lenormand, mise en scène Gaston Baty, Comédie Montaigne.
- 1921 : Le Chemin de Damas by Pierre Wolff, Théâtre du Vaudeville.
- 1924 : Le Bien-aîmé by Jacques Deval, Théâtre de la Renaissance.
- 1925 : Le Bel Amour by Edmond Sée, Théâtre Fémina.
- 1927 : Berlioz by Charles Méré, mise en scène Émile Couvelaine, Théâtre de la Porte-Saint-Martin.
- 1932 : Andromaque by Racine, Théâtre Antoine.
- 1934 : Un roi, deux dames et un valet by François Porche, Comédie des Champs-Élysées.
- 1936 : Elizabeth, la femme sans homme by André Josset, mise en scène René Rocher, Théâtre du Vieux-Colombier.
- 1937 : Le Simoun by Henri-René Lenormand, mise en scène Camille Corney, Théâtre des Célestins.
- 1938 : Frénésie by Charles de Peyret-Chappuis, mise en scène Charles de Rochefort, Théâtre Charles de Rochefort.
- 1938 : Les Parents terribles by Jean Cocteau, mise en scène Alice Cocéa, Théâtre des Ambassadeurs.
- 1941 : L'Amazone aux bas bleus by Albert Boussac de Saint-Marc, mise en scène Paulette Pax, Théâtre de l'Œuvre.
- 1942 : Les Dieux de la nuit by Charles de Peyret-Chappuis, mise en scène Camille Corney, Théâtre Hébertot.
- 1953 : Le Piège à l'innocent by Eduardo Sola Franco, mise en scène Jean Le Poulain, Théâtre de l'Œuvre.
- 1954 : Un inspecteur vous demande by John Boynton Priestley, Théâtre La Bruyère.
- 1955 : Pour Lucrèce by Jean Giraudoux, mise en scène Jean-Louis Barrault, Théâtre des Célestins.
