= La vie et la passion de Jésus-Christ =

1898 French silent religious drama film

La Vie et la Passion de Jésus-Christ
- Directed by: Georges Hatot, Louis Lumière
- Produced by: Lumière brothers
- Cinematography: Alexandre Promio
- Release date: 1898
- Running time: Short film
- Country: France
- Language: Silent

La Vie et la Passion de Jésus-Christ is a French silent religious drama film released in 1898 and produced by the Lumière company. Directed by Georges Hatot in collaboration with Louis Lumière, the film presents a series of tableaux illustrating episodes from the life of Jesus Christ. Each scene was originally issued as thirteen separate short films in the Lumière catalogue, numbered 933–945.

The film is one of the earliest known cinematic representations of the Passion narrative and predates the more widely known Pathé production of the same title from 1903.

== Background and production ==
The film was created during a period when the Lumière company was experimenting with staged dramatic scenes in addition to their documentary-style vues. According to film historian Richard Abel, the Lumières’ dramatic productions of the late 1890s were often delegated to Georges Hatot, who specialized in religious and historical subjects.

Cinematography was handled by Alexandre Promio, one of the Lumière company's most prolific cameramen.

== Structure ==
The surviving compilations of the film typically include the following scenes, each originally distributed separately:

- L’adoration des Mages (no. 933)
- La fuite en Égypte (no. 934)
- L'arrivée à Jérusalem (no.935)
- Trahison de Judas (no. 936)
- Résurrection de Lazare (no. 937)
- La Cène (no. 938)
- L’arrestation de Jésus-Christ (no. 939)
- La flagellation (no. 940)
- Le couronnement d’épines (no. 941)
- La mise en croix (no. 942)
- Le Calvaire (no. 943)
- La mise au tombeau (no. 944)
- La résurrection (no. 945)

The role of Jesus Christ is attributed to Gaston Breteau, although documentation from the period is limited.

== Plot ==
The film dramatizes major episodes from the New Testament narrative, beginning with the Annunciation and the Nativity. Subsequent scenes depict the Adoration of the Magi, the Flight into Egypt, miracles performed during Jesus’ ministry, the betrayal by Judas, the trial before Pontius Pilate, the Crucifixion, and the Resurrection.

== Preservation ==
A digital copy of the film is preserved by the Library of Congress, which holds a 35mm print under the catalogue number 78710669.

The film is also documented in the Institut Lumière archives and in the Bibliothèque nationale de France catalogue.

== Reception and significance ==
Although later Passion films became more elaborate and widely distributed, the 1898 Lumière production is recognized by scholars as part of the earliest wave of biblical dramatizations in cinema. Paul C. Spehr identifies these late‑nineteenth‑century French religious tableaux as foundational works that helped establish the visual and narrative conventions later associated with Passion films.

Terry Lindvall similarly notes that early European religious films, including the Lumière tableaux, played a formative role in shaping audience expectations for cinematic portrayals of biblical stories. He argues that these pioneering productions contributed to the emergence of a distinct tradition of Christian filmmaking in the silent era.

== Confusion with later films ==
The film is frequently confused with the Pathé production La Vie et la Passion de Jésus-Christ (1903), directed by Ferdinand Zecca and Lucien Nonguet. The two works share similar titles and subject matter, but differ significantly in scale, length, and production style.
