= Lucien Andriot =

French and American cinematographer (1892–1979)

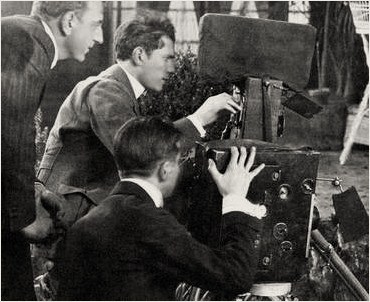
- Lucien Andriot at the camera, with director Maurice Tourneur at left and John van den Broek at the second camera below, shooting The Poor Little Rich Girl (1917)
- Born: November 19, 1892; Paris, France
- Died: March 19, 1979 (aged 86)
- Occupation: Cinematographer
- Years active: 1915–58
- Known for: More than 200 films and television programs

Lucien Andriot ASC (English: /ɒ̃ˈdrioʊ/ ahn-DREE-oh, French: [lysjɛ̃ ɑ̃dʁjo]; November 19, 1892 – March 19, 1979) was a French and American cinematographer. He shot more than 200 films and television programs over the course of his career.

== Life and work ==
Born in Paris, Andriot began his career in France in 1909 working for Victorin-Hippolyte Jasset. His elder sister Josette Andriot was a French film actress, working for Jasset. He then came to the U.S. some time before 1914 as an employee of the Éclair American Company based in Fort Lee, New Jersey.

The outbreak of World War I drove a re-organization of foreign film-industry assets in Fort Lee, including the employees. Now working for the World Film Company, financed by Lewis J. Selznick and run by William A. Brady, Andriot became a member of a separate French-speaking unit within World Film. For about three years, Maurice Tourneur, George Archainbaud, Emile Chautard, and Albert Capellani worked together on films such as the 1915 version of Camille, including the teaching of Josef von Sternberg.

Andriot moved to Hollywood around 1920 and went to work for Fox. The cinematography of the early widescreen John Wayne western The Big Trail in 1930 is unfortunately not his work. It was the standard-looking 35mm version, shot in parallel alongside Arthur Edeson's ground-breaking "70mm Grandeur" version.

Andriot did show a long-standing affinity for French directors working in Hollywood, initially Maurice Tourneur, and later René Clair, Robert Florey, and Jean Renoir. In the 1930s and 1940s, Andriot worked principally on B pictures for major studios. He did some television work in the 1950s and early 1960s, and retired to Palm Springs, California.

Andriot is buried at Forest Lawn Memorial Park, Glendale.

== Partial filmography ==
Andriot's films include:

- The Face in the Moonlight (1915)
- The Poor Little Rich Girl (1917)
- The Mad Lover (1917)
- The Virtuous Model (1919)
- Help Wanted - Male (1920)
- The Man Who Lost Himself (1920)
- That Girl Montana (1921)
- The Last Trail (1921)
- Why Trust Your Husband? (1921)
- A Connecticut Yankee in King Arthur's Court (1921)
- Shame (1921)
- West of Chicago (1922)
- The Ragged Heiress (1922)
- When Love Comes (1922)
- Roughshod (1922)
- Captain Fly-by-Night (1922)
- Monte Cristo (1922)
- In the Palace of the King (1923)
- The Dangerous Flirt (1924)
- Traffic in Hearts (1924)
- East of Broadway (1924)
- The Thundering Herd (1925)
- Volcano! (1926)
- Gigolo (1926)
- Bachelor Brides (1926)
- White Gold (1927)
- The Main Event (1927)
- A Ship Comes In (1928)
- Christina (1929)
- Happy Days (1929)
- The Valiant (1929)
- The Big Trail (1930) (35mm version)
- Don't Bet on Women (1931)
- Bird of Paradise (1932)
- Topaze (1933)
- Anne of Green Gables (1934)
- Charlie Chan at the Opera (1936)
- The Gay Desperado (1936)
- You Can't Have Everything (1937)
- Mr. Moto in Danger Island (1939)
- The Lady in Question (1940)
- Lucky Cisco Kid (1940)
- Moon Over Her Shoulder (1941)
- The Lone Star Ranger (1942)
- Manila Calling (1942)
- Secret Agent of Japan (1942)
- Jitterbugs (1943)
- Paris After Dark (1943)
- They Came to Blow Up America (1943)
- The Fighting Sullivans (1944)
- The Southerner (1945)
- And Then There Were None (1945)
- The Diary of a Chambermaid (1946)
- The Strange Woman (1946)
- Dishonored Lady (1947)
- Outpost in Morocco (1949)
- Johnny One-Eye (1950)
- Borderline (1950)
- Home Town Story (1951)
- Half Human (1958) (American sequences)
