= Victorin-Hippolyte Jasset =

French film director and writer

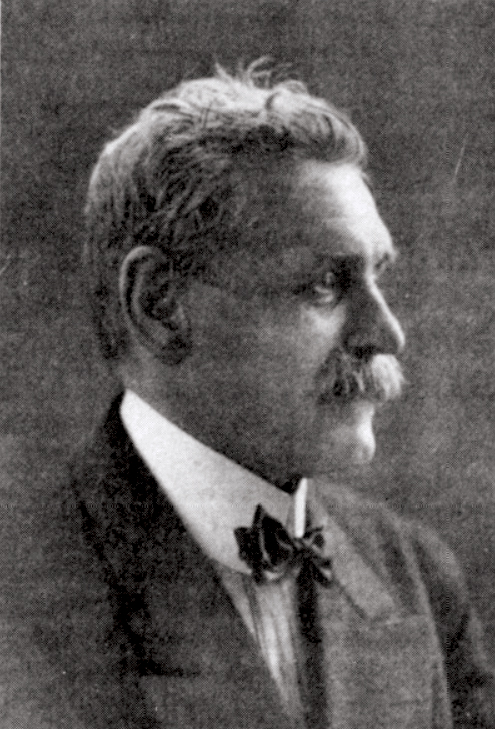
- Born: 30 March 1862; Fumay, Ardennes, France
- Died: 22 June 1913 (aged 51); Paris, France
- Occupations: silent film director, film writer
- Spouse: Victorine-Caroline-Adolphine Diey

Bandits en automobile (1912)

Victorin-Hippolyte Jasset (30 March 1862 - 22 June 1913) was an early film pioneer in France, active between the years 1905 and 1913. He worked on many genres of film and was particularly associated with the development of detective or crime serials, such as the Nick Carter and Zigomar series.

== Career ==
Victorin Jasset was born to a pair of innkeepers in Fumay in the Ardennes region of France in 1862, and after studying painting and sculpture with Dalou, he began a career designing theatre costumes and as a decorator of fans. He then became known as the producer and designer of spectacular ballets and pantomimes, notably Vercingétorix in 1900 at the newly built Théâtre de l'Hippodrome in Paris. In 1905 he was hired by Gaumont to work with Alice Guy on film productions such as La Esméralda (1905), based on Victor Hugo's Notre Dame de Paris, and La Vie du Christ (1906), working firstly as a designer and then as assistant director.

Poster for the 1908 film

After a short period working for the Éclipse film company, Jasset was engaged in 1908 by the new Éclair production company to make film series beginning with Nick Carter, le roi des détectives. The detective hero Nick Carter was based on the series of popular American novels which were then being published in France by the German publisher Eichler. Jasset kept the name of the character but invented new adventures with a Parisian setting. The first six sections that Jasset directed were released at bi-weekly intervals in late 1908, and each one narrated a complete story.

Following another short period working for the small Raleigh & Robert company, Jasset returned to Éclair and travelled to North Africa to produce a series of fiction films and documentaries in Tunisia, taking advantage of its natural light and spectacular locations such as the ruins of Carthage. In the summer of 1910 he returned to Paris to become the "artistic director" of the Éclair studio, having oversight of all the company's production as well as his own film-making unit. In 1911 he made Zigomar, taking his title character from the popular newspaper and magazine stories of Léon Sazie about a master-criminal. This feature-length film was so successful that a second title, Zigomar contre Nick Carter (1912), was made ready within six months, and a third instalment followed in 1913, Zigomar peau d'anguille. Jasset adapted other popular novels such as Gaston Leroux's Balaoo in 1913, and in the same year Protéa, a spy story in which for the first time the title character was a woman, played by a long-time favourite actress of Jasset, Josette Andriot. The Protéa series continued after Jasset's death.

In 1912 Jasset turned from fantasy and spectacle to realism in making a Zola adaptation, as part of Éclair's new series of social dramas. For Au pays des ténèbres, based on Germinal, he took his crew to Charleroi in Belgium to film in authentic locations, and although he updated the story to the present, he went to great lengths to recreate in the studio the detail of the actual mining galleries, exploiting the ability of film to be a recorder of contemporary reality.

Jasset's final film Protéa (1913)

Jasset had just embarked on adaptations of two novels by Jules Verne when in June 1913 he became seriously ill. He entered hospital for an operation which initially appeared to be successful, but after a short revival he died in Paris on 22 June 1913. He was buried in the vault of his wife's family in Père Lachaise cemetery. His last film Protéa was released in September, perhaps edited by someone else.

Jasset made over 100 films, and explored many different genres apart from the crime serial. Le Capitaine Fracasse (1909) was a literary adaptation from Théophile Gautier; Journée de grève (1909) a documentary; Hérodiade (1910) a biblical-historical spectacle. Only a very limited number of his films survive.

He was remembered as a man of immense energy, versatility, and concern for detail, and he took particular trouble in his direction of actors. Alexandre Arquillière, who appeared in several of Jasset's films including the role of Zigomar, recalled "a slender grizzled silhouette, with a damaged eye... the tireless energy of this director who did not even take the time to sleep when he was making a film".

== Influence ==
The most immediate influence of Jasset's work was seen in the films of Louis Feuillade, who was working at Gaumont and took the film serial to new heights with Fantômas (1913–14), Les Vampires (1915–16) and Judex (1916). These variously developed the roles of the resourceful detective, the master-criminal, and the mysterious woman of action who had previously appeared in Jasset's Nick Carter, Zigomar and Protéa films.

The model of crime and adventure series and serials developed by Jasset and Feuillade was taken up elsewhere in Europe during the next few years: Dr Gar el Hama (1911) in Denmark; Lieutenant Daring (1911- ) in the UK; Tigris (1913) and the Za La Mort series (1914–1924) in Italy. The Pathé company's American branch took the serial to new levels of worldwide popularity with its production of The Perils of Pauline (1914).

Jasset also contributed to early film theory with a journal article in which he analysed film style and the national characteristics of cinema.

== Selected filmography ==
- La Esméralda (1905)
- La Vie du Christ (1906)
- Nick Carter, le roi des détectives (1908) (6 episodes)
- Riffle Bill, le roi de la prairie (1908) (5 episodes)
- Nouveaux exploits de Nick Carter (1909)
- La Fleur empoisonnée (1909)
- Journée de grève (1909)
- Docteur Phantom (1909) (6 episodes)
- Le Capitaine Fracasse (1909)
- Hérodiade (1910)
- Zigomar (Zigomar, roi des voleurs) (1911)
- Au pays des ténèbres (1912)
- Bandits en automobile (1912)
- Le Cerceuil de verre (1912)
- Zigomar contre Nick Carter (1912)
- Les Batailles de la vie (1912)
- Tom Butler (1912)
- Zigomar peau d'anguille (1913)
- Balaoo (1913)
- Protéa (1913)
