= The Cameo =

- Directed by: Maurice Tourneur
- Starring: Emmy Lynn; Henry Roussel; Alexandre Arquillière
- Production company: Société Française des Films Éclair
- Release date: 1913
- Country: France
- Languages: Silent; French intertitles

The Cameo (French: Le camée) is a 1913 French silent drama film directed by Maurice Tourneur and starring Emmy Lynn, Henry Roussel and Alexandre Arquillière.

== Bibliography ==
- Waldman, Harry. Maurice Tourneur: The Life and Films. McFarland, 2001.
