= Josette Andriot =

French actress (1886–1942)

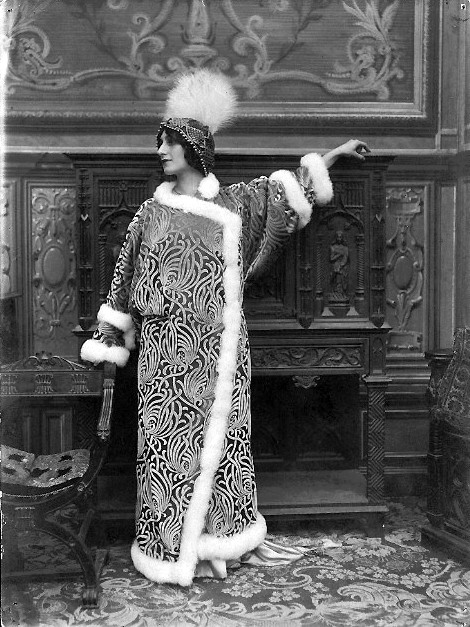
- Josette Andriot in Protéa (1913)
- Born: Camille-Élisa Andriot; 23 August 1886; Paris, France
- Died: 13 May 1942 (aged 55); Antibes, France
- Occupation: silent film actress
- Years active: 1909–1918
- Spouses: Raymond-André-Hippolyte Guille-noces (m. 1916) Jean-Marie Leclerc (m. 1924) Paul-Jules-Henri Legros (m. 1936)

Josette Andriot (English: /ɒ̃ˈdrioʊ/ ahn-DREE-oh, French: [ʒɔzɛt ɑ̃dʁjo]; 23 August 1886 – 13 May 1942) was a French film actress of the silent film era, best known for playing the role of Protéa in the series of espionage films made between 1913 and 1919.

She was born Camille-Élisa Andriot on 23 August 1886, in Paris (20^{e}), the fifth of six children whose father was a dyer and their mother a florist. Her youngest brother Lucien Andriot (1892-1979) became a noted cinematographer. She joined the Éclair studios as an actress first in 1909, and then from 1911 she made around 60 films exclusively for that studio. She had no theatrical training, and the skills that she brought to the film studio were those of an accomplished sportswoman in riding, cycling, and swimming. She proved to be a natural actress.

Her early films were made principally with the director Victorin-Hippolyte Jasset, for whom she became a favourite performer. In his Zigomar series, she played Rosaria, the title-character's accomplice, forever escaping from threatening predicaments. In 1913 Jasset made Protéa, a spy adventure with the distinction of being the first to have a woman as the central action figure. The film had considerable success, and Andriot went on to make four more films in the series with other directors. After the last one was released in 1919, she retired from acting. She died on 13 May 1942 in Antibes.

Her appeal rested on her physical ability as a woman of action and her cool resourcefulness. A reviewer in 1913 observed that "Whatever this most dauntless of women dares to do, she undertakes it with a smile on her lips." In her role as Protéa, she also wore a characteristic costume of a close-fitting black jersey, two years before Musidora achieved cult status with her similar appearance as Irma Vep in Feuillade's Les Vampires.
