= Montigny-sur-Meuse =

- Commune
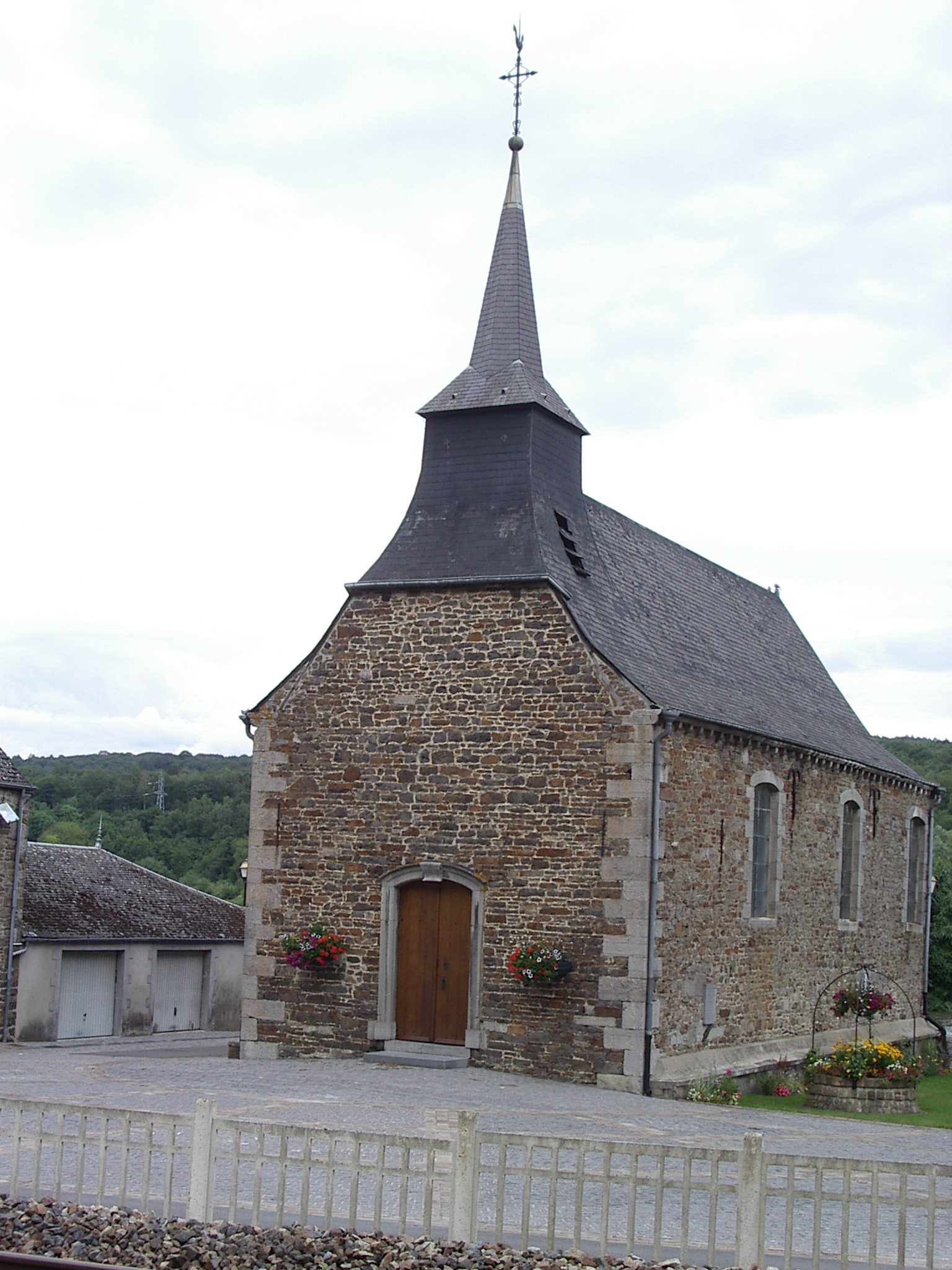
- The church in Montigny-sur-Meuse

- Coat of arms
- Location of Montigny-sur-Meuse
- Location within France Location within Grand Est
- Coordinates: 50°02′59″N 4°43′21″E
- Country: France
- Region: Grand Est
- Department: Ardennes
- Arrondissement: Charleville-Mézières
- Canton: Revin
- Intercommunality: Ardenne Rives de Meuse

Government
  - Mayor (2020–2026): Philippe Ravidat
- Area^{1}: 8.1 km^{2} (3.1 sq mi)
- Population (2023): 76
  - Density: 9.4/km^{2} (24/sq mi)
- Time zone: UTC+01:00 (CET)
  - Summer (DST): UTC+02:00 (CEST)
- INSEE/Postal code: 08304 /08170
- ^{1} French Land Register data, which excludes lakes, ponds, glaciers > 1 km^{2} (0.386 sq mi or 247 acres) and river estuaries.

Montigny-sur-Meuse (French pronunciation: [mɔ̃tiɲi syʁ møz], literally Montigny on Meuse) is a commune in the Ardennes department in northern France.It is Located near a Nuclear Power Plant

== Population ==
Historical population
Year	Pop.	±% p.a.
1968	130	—
1975	101	−3.54%
1982	99	−0.29%
1990	104	+0.62%
1999	78	−3.15%
2007	83	+0.78%
2012	92	+2.08%
2017	80	−2.76%
2023	76	−0.85%
Source: INSEE

== See also ==
- Communes of the Ardennes department
