= Instinct (1930 film) =

1930 film

- Directed by: André Liabel; Léon Mathot
- Written by: Henry Kistemaeckers (play)
- Cinematography: René Gaveau
- Production companies: Franco Films; Paris International Film
- Distributed by: Film Aubert-Franco-Film
- Release date: 4 April 1930
- Country: France
- Languages: Silent; French intertitles

Instinct (French: L'instinct) is a 1930 French drama film directed by André Liabel and Léon Mathot and starring Léon Mathot, Madeleine Carroll and André Marnay.

== Cast ==
- Léon Mathot
- Madeleine Carroll
- André Marnay
- Irène Brillant
- Gil Roland

== Bibliography ==
- James Monaco. The Encyclopedia of Film. Perigee Books, 1991.
