= La Souriante Madame Beudet =

1923 film by Germaine Dulac

- Directed by: Germaine Dulac
- Written by: Germaine Dulac
- Based on: La Souriante Madame Beudet; 1921 play by Denys Amiel; André Obey
- Produced by: Charles Delac; Marcel Vandal
- Starring: Germaine Dermoz; Alexandre Arquillière
- Cinematography: Maurice Forster; Paul Parguel
- Release date: 1923
- Running time: 38 mins.
- Country: France
- Languages: Silent film French intertitles

La Souriante Madame Beudet

La Souriante Madame Beudet (The Smiling Madame Beudet) is a short French impressionist silent film made in 1923, directed by pioneering avant-garde cinema director Germaine Dulac. It stars Germaine Dermoz as Madame Beudet and Alexandre Arquillière as Monsieur Beudet. It is considered by many to be one of the first truly "feminist" films. It tells the story of an intelligent woman trapped in a loveless marriage.

== Synopsis ==
Monsieur Beudet frequently puts an empty revolver to his head and threatens to shoot himself as a practical joke or to emphasize his frustration. He does this so often that it no longer surprises his wife or friends. One night, Monsieur Beudet gets some theater tickets, but his wife refuses to go with him. While he is gone, Madame Beudet spends some time reflecting on her marriage to a slovenly, unromantic man who does things like lock the lid of her piano when he's upset with her; she puts a bullet into her husband's revolver so he will accidentally kill himself the next time he repeats his joke.

After a sleepless night, Madame Beudet comes to feel remorse for the trap she has set. Unfortunately, that day Monsieur Beudet's office is never unoccupied long enough for her to remove the bullet from the revolver. Monsieur Beudet calls for his wife to ask her about some large household expenses. He gets worked up and, thinking the revolver is empty like it usually is, he points it at himself and then turns it on his wife. He shoots, but the bullet misses Madame Beudet. Monsieur Beudet wrongly surmises that his wife was trying to commit suicide. He embraces her and says "How could I live without you?"

== Legacy ==
La Souriante Madame Beudet is considered by some to be the first feminist film. Les Misères de l'aiguille (1914) and its themes of militant feminism, however, predate the 1923 Dulac film, as does Lois Weber's Where Are My Children? (1916) and Margaret Sanger's Birth Control (1917).

== Cast ==
- Germaine Dermoz as Madame Beudet
- Alexandre Arquillière as Monsieur Beudet
- Jean d'Yd as Monsieur Labas
- Madeleine Guitty as Madame Labas
- Raoul Paoli as Le champion de tennis

== See also ==
- Lists of French films
- Women's cinema
