= The Girl Stage Driver =

1914 film

- Directed by: Webster Cullison
- Starring: Norbert A. Myles; Edna Payne; Will E. Sheerer
- Production company: Eclair Film Company
- Distributed by: Universal Film Manufacturing Company
- Release date: December 2, 1914
- Running time: Two reels
- Country: United States
- Languages: Silent; English intertitles

The Girl Stage Driver is a 1914 American short silent Western film. It was directed by Webster Cullison and was thought to have been lost, but an incomplete 35 mm positive print was found in 2009 in the New Zealand Film Archive. The film was shot in Tucson, Arizona.

== Cast ==
- Norbert A. Myles as The Sheriff
- Edna Payne as The Girl
- Will E. Sheerer as The Girl's Father

== See also ==
- List of rediscovered films
