= Canton of Revin =

Coordinates: 49.94°N 4.64°E

- Canton
- Situation of the canton of Revin in the department of Ardennes
- Country: France
- Region: Grand Est
- Department: Ardennes
- No. of communes: {{{nbcomm}}}
- Population (2023): 11,556
- INSEE code: 0812

The canton of Revin is an administrative division of the Ardennes department, northern France. Its borders were modified at the French canton reorganisation which came into effect in March 2015. Its seat is in Revin.

It consists of the following communes:

1. Anchamps
2. Fépin
3. Fumay
4. Hargnies
5. Haybes
6. Montigny-sur-Meuse
7. Revin
