= Charles-Hippolyte de Paravey =

French engineer

Charles-Hippolyte de Paravey (25 September 1787, Fumay (Ardennes) – 1871, Saint-Germain-en-Laye) was a 19th-century French engineer and one of the founders of the Société Asiatique.

== Publications ==
- 1821: Rapport de M. le chevalier Delambre, sur les mémoires relatifs à l'origine commune des sphères de tous les anciens peuples et à l'époque voisine du commencement de notre ère que retracent les zodiaques découverts en Égypte, spécialement ceux de Dendera, mémoires lus et présentés à l'Académie, with Jean-Baptiste Joseph Delambre, Paris : A. Belin,
- 1822: Nouvelles considérations sur le planisphère de Dendéra, où, nonobstant les calculs de M. Biot, et en employant aussi le système de projection indiqué par M. Delambre, on démontre que ce monument n'offre autre chose que la sphère d'Hipparque, telle qu'elle est figurée sur le globe farnèse, Paris : Treuttel & Wurtz, in-8°, 31 p.
- 1826: Essai sur l'origine unique et hiéroglyphique des chiffres et des lettres de tous les peuples, Paris : Treuttel et Wurtz, .
- 1821: Aperçu des mémoires encore manuscrits, sur l'origine de la sphère et sur l'âge de zodiaques, Paris, 1821, reprinted & annotated in 1835
- Des découvertes récentes sur l'origine asiatique des peuples de Bogota, dans Le Correspondant, n°46, du mardi 19 janvier 1830
- 1835: Essai sur quelques zodiaques apportés des Indes, dans les Annales de philosophie chrétienne,
- 1835: Illustrations de l'astronomie hiéroglyphique et des planisphères et zodiaques retrouvés en Égypte, en Chaldée, dans l'Inde et au Japon, ou, Réfutation des mémoires astronomiques de Dupuis, de Volney, de Fourier et de M. Biot, Paris : Treuttel & Wurtz, et Bachelier,
- 1835: Mémoire sur l'origine Japonaise, Arabe et Basque de la civilisation des peuples du plateau de Bogota, Paris : Dondey-Dupré & Théophile Barrois, (tiré-à-part du n°56 des Annales de philosophie chrétienne) —
- 1836: Dissertation abrégée sur le nom antique et hiéroglyphique de la Judée, ou Traditions conservées en Chine, sus l'ancien pays de Tsin, pays qui fut celui des céréales et de la croix, Paris : Treuttel et Wurtz, (tiré-à-part du numéro 70 des Annales de philosophie chrétienne) .
- 1838: Documens hiéroglyphiques, emportés d'Assyrie, et conservés en Chine et en Amérique, sur le déluge de Noé, les dix générations avant le déluge, l'existence d'un premier homme, et celle du péché original: dogmes qui sont la base du christianisme, mais qui sont niés en ce jour, Paris : Treuttel et Wurtz, (tiré-à-part des Annales de philosophie chrétienne) .
- 1838: Lettres du Chevalier de Paravey au Président de l'Académie des sciences : deux lettres sur les caractères de l'écriture chinoise qui désignent le cheval et les conclusions qu'on peut en tirer, et sur la vraisemblance de l'existence d'instruments d'optique chez les anciens, Paris, 18 octobre 1837 & 2 février 1838, Lille : impr. de L. Lefort, .
- 1839: Dissertation sur les Ting-Ling dont parlent les livres chinois, ou sur la véritable nation à laquelle on donnait le nom de centaures dans l'antiquité, Paris : Treuttel & Wurtz et Mazé,
- 1840: Note abrégée relative aux obos ou tumulus du Bosphore cimmérien analogues aux stoupas de l'Inde occidentale, dans le Journal asiatique, n°16
- 1840: Dissertation sur les Amazones, dont le souvenir est conservé en Chine, ou comparaison de de que nous apprennent les monumens indiens et les livres chinois, sur les Niu-Mou-Yo, avec les documens que nous ont laissés les Grecs, Paris : Treuttel et Wurtz, (tiré-à-part du n° 1, III° série des Annales de philosophie chrétienne), in-8°, 22p.
- 1844: L'Amérique sous le nom de pays de Fou-Sang, Paris : Treuttel & Wurtz, (tiré-à-part des Annales de philosophie chrétienne) —
- 1863: Traditions primitives : De quelques faits bibliques retrouvés dans les hiéroglyphes chinois, et réfutation de quelques assertions de M. Renan, Roanne, imprimerie Ferlay, .
- 1864: De la création de l'homme, comme androgyne, et de la formation de la femme, with lithography, in-8° à 2 col., 8 p., Roanne; Paris : Maisonneuve et C^{ie}, (tiré à part de La France littéraire artistique et scientifique de Lyon, 1864).
- 1864: Du cycle des douze animaux correspondants au cycles des douze heures et au cycle des douze années, in La France Littéraire.
- Recherches sur les noms primitifs de Dieu, with notes by Adrien Pélalan fils, B. Duprat, in-8°, 14 pages (tiré-à-part des Annales de la philosophie chrétienne).
- 1866: Dissertation sur les Centaures et les Amazones, Roanne : impr. de Ferlay, in-8°, 38 p.

== Bibliography ==
- Jean-Baptiste-Joseph Boulliot, Biographie Ardennaise ou histoire des Ardennais, Paris, 1830, vol.2, p. 490-493 .
- Jean-Claude Drouin, Un esprit original du XIXe siècle : le chevalier de Paravey (1787-1871), dans Revue d'histoire de Bordeaux et du département de la Gironde, 1970, pp 65–78
