= Fépin =

- Commune
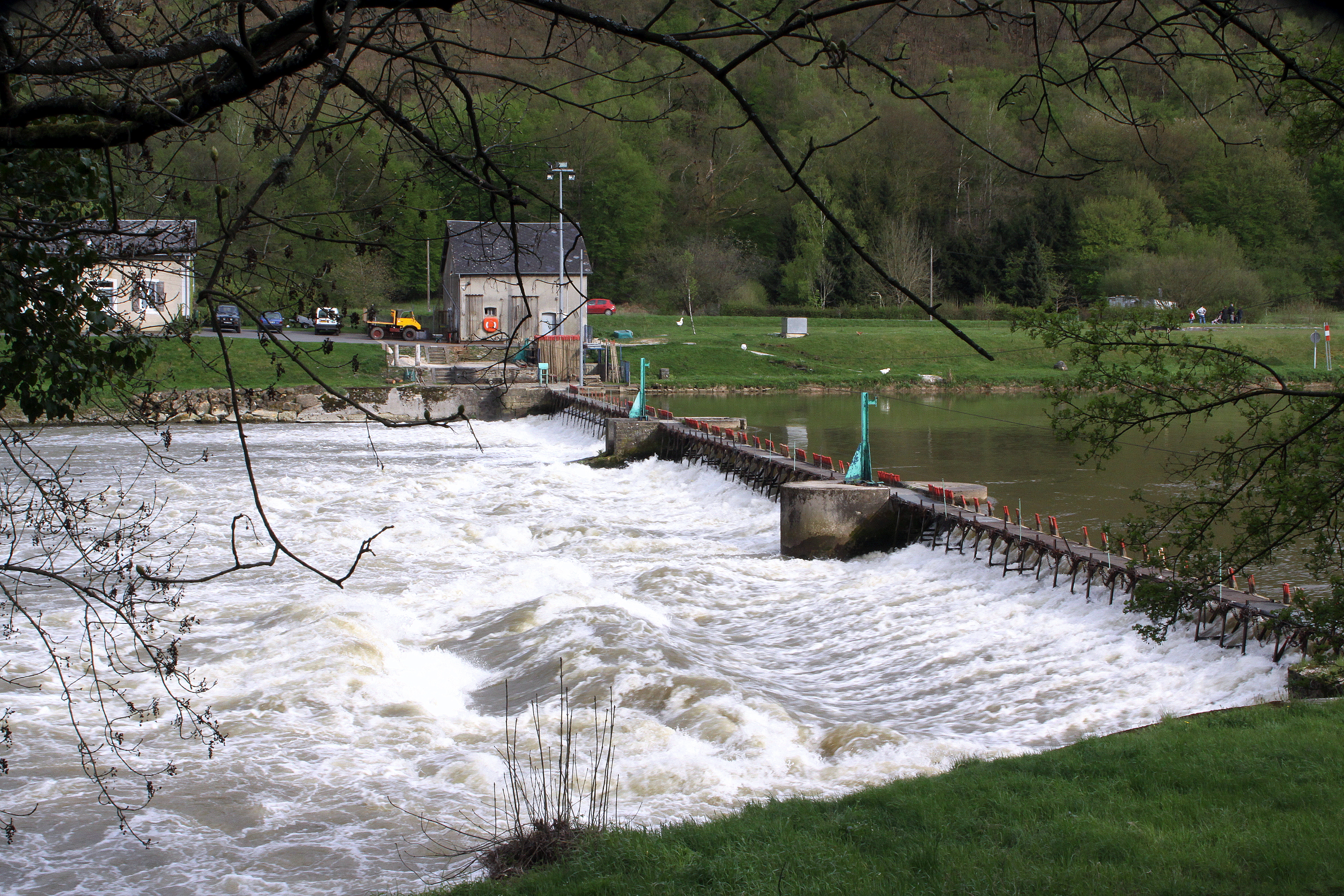
- The dam in Fépin

- Coat of arms
- Location of Fépin
- Location within France Location within Grand Est
- Coordinates: 50°01′13″N 4°43′47″E
- Country: France
- Region: Grand Est
- Department: Ardennes
- Arrondissement: Charleville-Mézières
- Canton: Revin
- Intercommunality: Ardenne Rives de Meuse

Government
  - Mayor (2021–2026): Virginie Rogissart
- Area^{1}: 5.79 km^{2} (2.24 sq mi)
- Elevation: 118 m (387 ft)
- Population (2023): 233
  - Density: 40.2/km^{2} (104/sq mi)
- Time zone: UTC+01:00 (CET)
  - Summer (DST): UTC+02:00 (CEST)
- INSEE/Postal code: 08166 /08170
- ^{1} French Land Register data, which excludes lakes, ponds, glaciers > 1 km^{2} (0.386 sq mi or 247 acres) and river estuaries.

Fépin (French pronunciation: [fepɛ̃]) is a commune in the Ardennes department in northern France.

== Population ==
Historical population
Year	Pop.	±% p.a.
1968	294	—
1975	288	−0.29%
1982	288	+0.00%
1990	263	−1.13%
1999	244	−0.83%
2007	271	+1.32%
2012	283	+0.87%
2017	265	−1.31%
2023	233	−2.12%
Source: INSEE

== See also ==
- Communes of the Ardennes department
