= Willy Sanders =

British child actor (1906-?)

Four year old Willy Sanders in The Man to Beat Jack Johnson

Willy Sanders, also Willie Sanders (1906–?) was a British child actor also active in France.

Willie was born in Liverpool. His debut film was the 1910 silent short comedy film The Man to Beat Jack Johnson. Jack Johnson was the world heavyweight boxing champion at the time, however, in the film Willy takes on an unremarkable white adult. Historian Andrew Horrall gave the following desription:

"Sanders, a blonde-headed Scouse four-year-old boxed an adult who sat on the floor. Hard, swift punches were delivered by both fighters, but Willie flexed his biceps in triumph and smiled at the camera after knocking out his opponent in the third round."

The success of Willie's debut attracted an attention of the French film company Éclair, who were looking for a competition to the child actor Clément Mary, better known as René Dary in film series "Bébé produced by Pathé. During 1910–1916 Éclair produced over 70 film shorts with Willy. A 1913 article in the French magazine Fim-revue wrote:

If we hadn't seen him, we wouldn't believe this small child capable of skating, boxing, wrestling, riding a bicycle and a horse, playing the violin, etc...
