= The Man to Beat Jack Johnson =

- Screenshot from the film
- Produced by: Walter Tyler
- Starring: Willy Sanders
- Production company: Tyler Film Company
- Release date: 1910
- Running time: 3 mins 7 secs
- Country: United Kingdom
- Language: Silent

The Man to Beat Jack Johnson is a 1910 British short black-and-white silent comedy film, produced by the Tyler Film Company, featuring four-year-old Willy Sanders demonstrating his boxing and wrestling skills against an adult opponent.

== Description ==
The film "has the feel of a filmed music hall act (which it may have been)" thanks, according to Michael Brooke of BFI Screenonline, to a, "simple idea (and a slightly disturbing one)", which is, "primitive in its execution". A clip from this film is featured in Paul Merton's interactive guide to early British silent comedy How They Laughed.
