= Zigomar (film) =

1911 French silent film

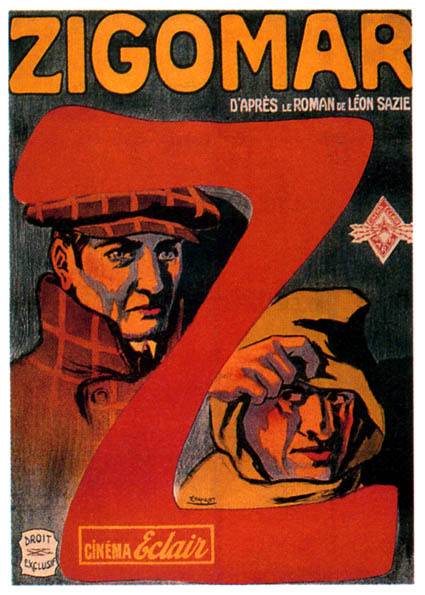
- Directed by: Victorin-Hippolyte Jasset
- Written by: Victorin-Hippolyte Jasset; Léon Sazie
- Produced by: Éclair
- Starring: Alexandre C. Arquillière; André Liabel
- Production company: Epinay Studios
- Release date: September 1911
- Running time: 57 minutes
- Country: France
- Language: French
- Budget: 23,000FF

Zigomar (French: Zigomar, roi des voleurs), also known as Zigomar, King of Thieves, King of Robbers, and The Phantom Bandit, is a 1911 French crime drama silent film directed by Victorin-Hippolyte Jasset and produced by Éclair. It was the first movie made by Jasset which used the character of Zigomar (who was originally created by the author Léon Sazie in 1909). The film was an adaptation of a serial of the same name from the French newspaper Le Matin. The film follows Paulin Broquet, the chief of police, as he tries to apprehend his crime lord nemesis, the titular Zigomar. The cast consists of Alexandre C. Arquillière as Zigomar and André Liabel as Paulin Broquet. The film was released as four reels titled The Great Train Robbery, The Leap for Life, The Alpine Death Struggle, and The Moulin Rouge Fire, and was followed up with Zigomar Against Nick Carter in 1912.

== Plot ==
At the start of the film, Paulin Broquet is going over police documents in his office while a servant cleans nearby. He leaves for a moment, and when he returns he finds that the documents have been replaced by a “thank you” card from Zigomar. The servant is gone too, as he was the thief in disguise.

Zigomar, disguised as an old man, buys flowers for a woman nicknamed Riri. She rejects him, however, and throws the bouquet into the street. A man walks up just in time to see the interaction and intervenes, after which Zigomar leaves them. Broquet arrives on the scene just in time to find a card dropped by Zigomar with directions for his Z Gang to meet him within St. Magloire Church. Intending on being present for the meeting, Broquet disguises himself as a tomb statue inside the church after inspecting the area ahead of time. When Zigomar and his gang arrive, they move a block which reveals a stairway under the building. They head down and Broquet sees they have been keeping Riri down there. Before he can head into the room he finds her in, he is captured and loaded on an outbound wagon that carries him off. The wagon gets into a crash, however, and the police arrive as the drivers of both wagons are fighting. As they open the crate Broquet is held captive in, the wagon driver from the Z gang attempts to flee on horseback, but is caught by the detective. He tells Broquet something which helps him track Zigomar down again.

Next, Zigomar attends a performance by the dancer Madame Sezes at Moulin Rouge to steal her $100,000 pearl necklace, and Broquet follows the criminal there. During the show, Zigomar sets fire to the venue as a diversion, but is captured by Broquet before he can take the pearls from the dying dancer. Zigomar, however, had a getaway planned, and slips away once again. As he slips away, the police arrive, and Riri is saved.

== Cast ==
The film reportedly had 500 cast members, among which were:

- Alexandre C. Arquillière (Zigomar)
- André Liabel (Paulin Broquet)
- Camille Bardou
- Paul Guidé
- Gilbert Dalleu
- Bataille
- Jacques Faure
- Esmée (Madame Sezes)

== Production ==
Léon Sazie, believing that film would revitalize interest in the theatre, granted the film rights for the Zigomar serial to Éclair. He wrote the script and picked out several of the cast members. It was partially filmed at Epinay Studios in France, with The Alpine Death Struggle being filmed at Mer de Glace in the French Alps.

== Release ==
Although the film was officially released in France on 14 September 1911 in Paris, France, there was a private showing in Moscow on 14 August of the same year, in addition to being released in Denmark on the same day. A month after the official release, it was released in the provincial cities, and later had releases in other languages and countries.

On 24 October, 1911, the film premiered for the first time in New Zealand at the Colosseum Theatre.

By 11 November, 1911, the film had premiered at the Ideal Theatre in Manila, Philippines under the Spanish title La Z mysteriosa. On the same day, it premiered in Asakusa, Japan, at Kinryūkan theatre after being imported by the Fukuhōdo company.

Around November 1911, E. Mandelbaum struck a deal with Éclair which gave his then newly incorporated business, the Feature and Education Film Company, the rights to the film in America. The film premiered in the United States on the 20th of that month.

It premiered at the Theatre of Prince Alfonso in Madrid, Spain on 14 December, 1911 as Zigomar, rey de los ladrones.

== Reception ==
=== United States ===
The Cairo Bulletin claimed that Zigomar was one of the most remarkable criminal story ever told and that it was the most magnificent, mystifying, and marvelous master-piece of motion pictures ever shown in Cairo.

=== Palestine ===
On 28 October 1911, Le Phare d'Alexandrie reported that 500 people had to be turned away from theaters every day for five days during its first run at the Chantecler.

=== Japan ===
When the film released in Japan, it was a commercial success, with 1600-2000 daily moviegoers and a net income of ¥8000. Several unauthorized sequels were produced by various studios such as Shin Jigoma from M.Pathé, Nihon Jigoma and Jigoma Kaishinroku from Yoshizawa Shōten, and Jigoma Daitantei from Fukuhōdo. Additionally, several publishers began releasing novelizations of the films and entirely new stories using the characters.

However, the success of the films came to be a concern for the police after the Tōkyō Asahi Shibun began accusing the film and its derivatives of corrupting the youth. On 9 October 1912, the Tokyo Metropolitan Police banned all screenings of any film using the characters or that were inspired by the original. In the following year, the discussion around the situation shifted from title-specific bans to a desire for a more centralized system of film censorship. Because of this shift, anti-Zigomar sentiments relaxed enough for the final film of the trilogy, Zigomar the Eelskin, to be shown in 1914.
