= Edna Payne =

American actress (1891–1953)

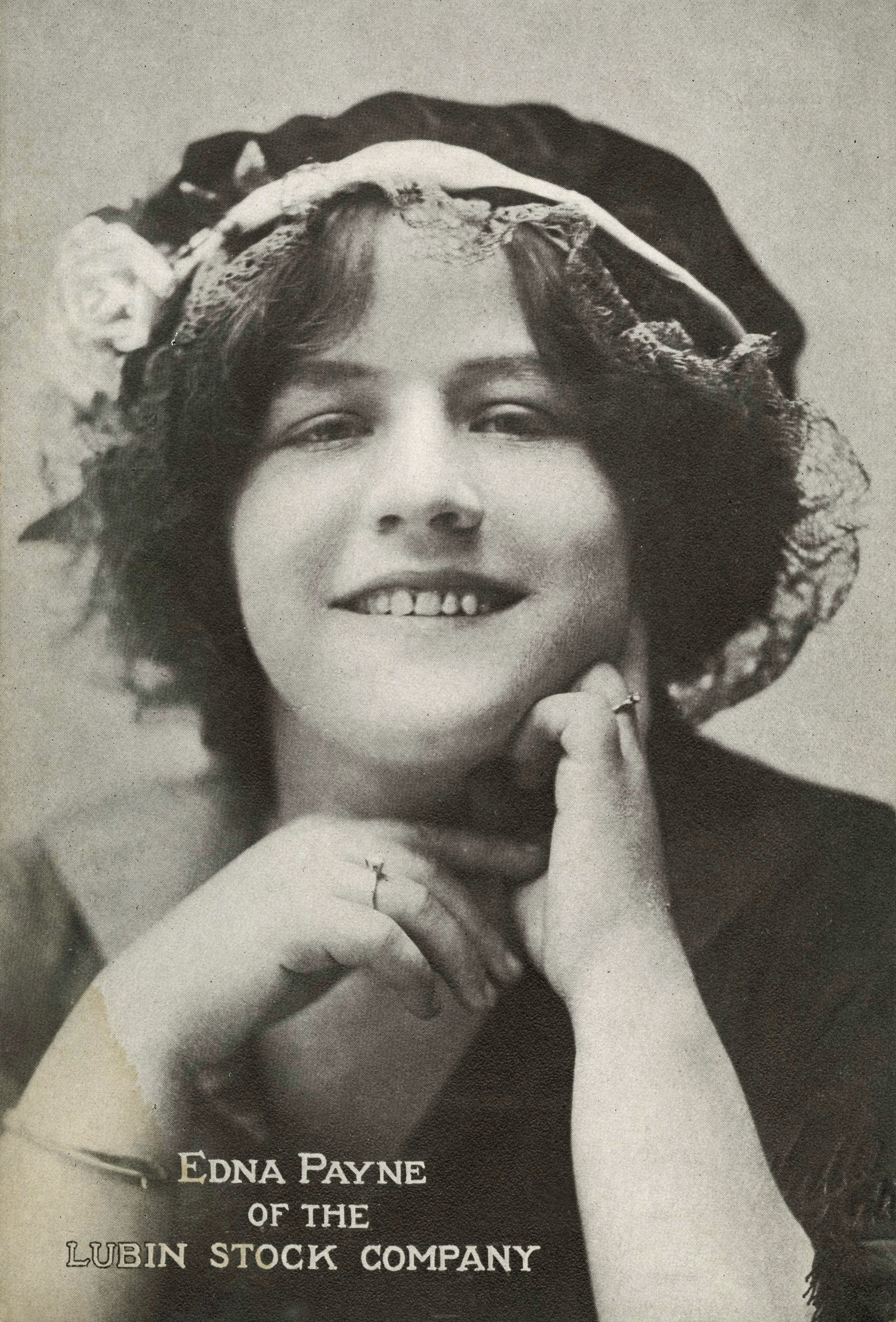
- Edna Payne in a Lubin publicity photo, ca. 1915
- Born: December 5, 1891; New York City, U.S.
- Died: January 31, 1953 (aged 61); Los Angeles, California, U.S.
- Resting place: Hollywood Forever Cemetery
- Occupation: Actress
- Years active: 1911–1917
- Spouse: Jack Rollens (m. 1917; div. 1925)
- Children: 2

Edna Payne (December 5, 1891 – January 31, 1953) was an American silent screen motion picture actress. She was not in any feature-length films, but is regarded as a "pioneer" in the film industry because she was in many short films from 1911 through 1917.

== Career ==
Her parents were both stage actors, so Payne began her career as a child in vaudeville, making her movie debut in Higgenses Versus Judsons (1911). She played the lead in reel dramas, and later in a few reel westerns including The Girl Stage Driver (1914). Although her film career was confined to the 1910s, she took part in countless productions.

== Family ==
She was married to actor Jack Rollens, whom she divorced in 1925. She had two children, Edna J, born in 1919, and Jack A, born in 1921.
