= André Liabel =

French actor

André Liabel was a French actor, film director and screenwriter.

André Liabel began his career as comedian by working full-time as an actor for the cinematographic company Laboratoires Éclair which had just opened its new studios at Épinay-sur-Seine in 1908.

He performed in more than sixty films until 1933. He also was assistant director.

== Selected filmography ==
Director

- 1913 : Jack, after the novel by Alphonse Daudet
- 1913 : La Petite chocolatière
- 1914 : Mademoiselle Josette, ma femme, script by Paul Gavault
- 1915 : Le Calvaire, (short film)
- 1919 : Le Sang des immortelles
- 1920 : Le Secret d'Alta Rocca, script by Valentin Mandelstamm
- 1922 : Des fleurs sur la mer, script by Henri-André Legrand
- 1924 : La Closerie des Genêts, after the novel by Frédéric Soulié
- 1928 : In the Shadow of the Harem, codirected with Léon Mathot
- 1929 : L'Appassionata, codirected with Léon Mathot after the play by Pierre Frondaie
- 1930 : Instinct, codirected avec Léon Mathot after the work by Henry Kistemaeckers

Assistant director

- 1924 : Paris by René Hervil
- 1926 : La Femme nue by Léonce Perret after the play by Henry Bataille
- 1928 : Morgane la sirène by Léonce Perret after the work of Charles Le Goffic

Screenwriter

- 1928 : Dans l'ombre du harem, codirected with Léon Mathot

Actor

- 1912 : Au pays des ténèbres, short film by Victorin Jasset
- 1923 : Koenigsmark
- 1926 : The Nude Woman
- 1930 : La Femme et le Rossignol by André Hugon : captain Gervais
- 1933 : The Two Orphans
