= Georges Hatot =

French filmmaker (1876-1959)

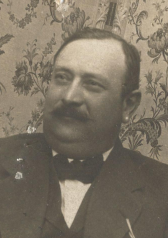
- Born: December 22, 1876; Paris, France
- Died: August 11, 1959 (aged 82)
- Occupations: Filmmaker, director, screenwriter, producer
- Years active: 1896–1922
- Spouse: 1

Georges Alphonse Hatot (22 December 1876 – 8 August 1959) was a theater manager and pioneering French filmmaker during the late 1890s and early twentieth century. He directed the first known film based on the story of Joan of Arc in 1898 as well as having made the first films to feature the Roman emperor Nero.

Besides being a director he also wrote the 1908 serial Nick Carter, le roi des détectives which was a major success and spawned many detective series in the following years.

== Biography ==
Georges Alphonse Hatot was born on December 22, 1876, in Paris.

== Filmography ==
Year	Title	Director	Producer	Writer	Notes
1897	Assassinat de Kléber	Yes			Produced by Société Lumière
1897	Assasinat du Duc de Guise	Yes			Produced by Société Lumière
1897	La Mort de Marat	Yes			Produced by Société Lumière
1897	Barbebleue	Yes			Produced by Société Lumière
1897	Bataille d'enfants à coups d'oreillers	Yes			Produced by Société Lumière
1897	Les Boxeurs et le spectateur trop curieux puni	Yes			Produced by Société Lumière
1897	Le Charpentier maladroit	Yes			Produced by Société Lumière
1897	Chez le cordonnier	Yes			Produced by Société Lumière
1897	Chez le juge de paix	Yes			Produced by Société Lumière
1897	Néron essayant des poisons sur des esclaves	Yes			Produced by Société Lumière
1898	Exécution de Jeanne d'Arc	Yes			Produced by Société Lumière
1898	Le Cocher de fiacre endormi	Yes			Produced by Gaumont
