= Esmeralda (1905 film) =

- Directed by: Alice Guy-Blaché
- Written by: Victor Hugo (novel)
- Starring: Denise Becker, Henry Vorins
- Release date: 1905
- Running time: 10 minutes
- Country: France
- Language: Silent film

Esmeralda (French: Esméralda) is a 1905 French short silent film based on the 1831 novel The Hunchback of Notre-Dame written by Victor Hugo. It was directed by Alice Guy-Blaché.

There are two characters in the film, Esmeralda (Denise Becker) and Quasimodo (Henry Vorins). The film is the oldest film adaptation of the novel.

The film was long considered to be lost, but an Italian film collector gave the last surviving copy to Gaumont.

== Bibliography ==
- Title: The Hunchback of Notre-Dame
- Authors: Victor Hugo, Frederic Shoberl
- Editor: Carey, Lea and Blanchard, 1834
