= Camille Corney =

French theatre director and stage actor

Camille Corney (died 11 June 1952 in Tunis) was a French theatre director and stage actor. He was the manager of the Studio des Champs-Élysées.

== Filmography ==
- 1933: Le Jugement de minuit by Alexander Esway and André Charlot
- 1933: Une vie perdue by Raymond Rouleau
- 1938: The Time of the Cherries by Jean-Paul Le Chanois

== Theater ==
=== Director ===
- 1928 L'Innocente by Henri-René Lenormand
- 1929 Au clair de la lune by Jehan Bouvelet and Edgar Bradby
- 1932 Le Paquebot Tenacity by Charles Vildrac
- 1942 Les Dieux de la nuit by Charles de Peyret-Chappuis
- 1943 Britannicus by Jean Racine
- 1949 Andromaque by Jean Racine

=== Actor ===
- 1924 Chacun sa vérité de Luigi Pirandello / directed by Charles Dullin
- 1925 George Dandin ou le Mari confondu by Molière / directed by Charles Dullin
- 1926 La Comédie du bonheur by Nikolai Evreinov / directed by Charles Dullin
- 1927 Mixture by Henri-René Lenormand / directed by Georges Pitoëff
- 1928 L'Innocente by Henri-René Lenormand / directed by Camille Corney
- 1928 La Maison des cœurs brisés by George Bernard Shaw / directed by Georges Pitoëff
- 1932 Dimanche by Claude Roger-Marx
- 1932 Le Paquebot Tenacity by Charles Vildrac / directed by Camille Corney
- 1951 Tapage nocturne by Marc-Gilbert Sauvajon / directed by Jean Wall
- 1951 Halte au destin by Jacques Chabannes / directed by Georges Douking
