= Alexandre Arquillière =

French actor (1870–1953)

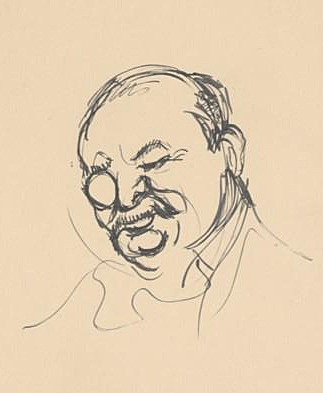
- Born: 18 April 1870; Boën-sur-Lignon, Loire, France
- Died: 9 June 1953 (aged 83); Saint-Étienne, Loire, France
- Occupation: Actor
- Years active: 1908-1939 (film)

Alexandre Arquillière (1870–1953) was a French stage and film actor.

== Selected filmography ==
- Zigomar (1911)
- Zigomar contre Nick Carter (1912)
- Zigomar the Eelskin (1913)
- The Cameo (1913)
- La folie du doute (1920)
- La Souriante Madame Beudet (1922)
- Le Bled (1929)
- The End of the Day (1939)

== Bibliography ==
- Waldman, Harry. Maurice Tourneur: The Life and Films. McFarland, 2001.
