= Hargnies, Ardennes =

Hargnies
- Commune
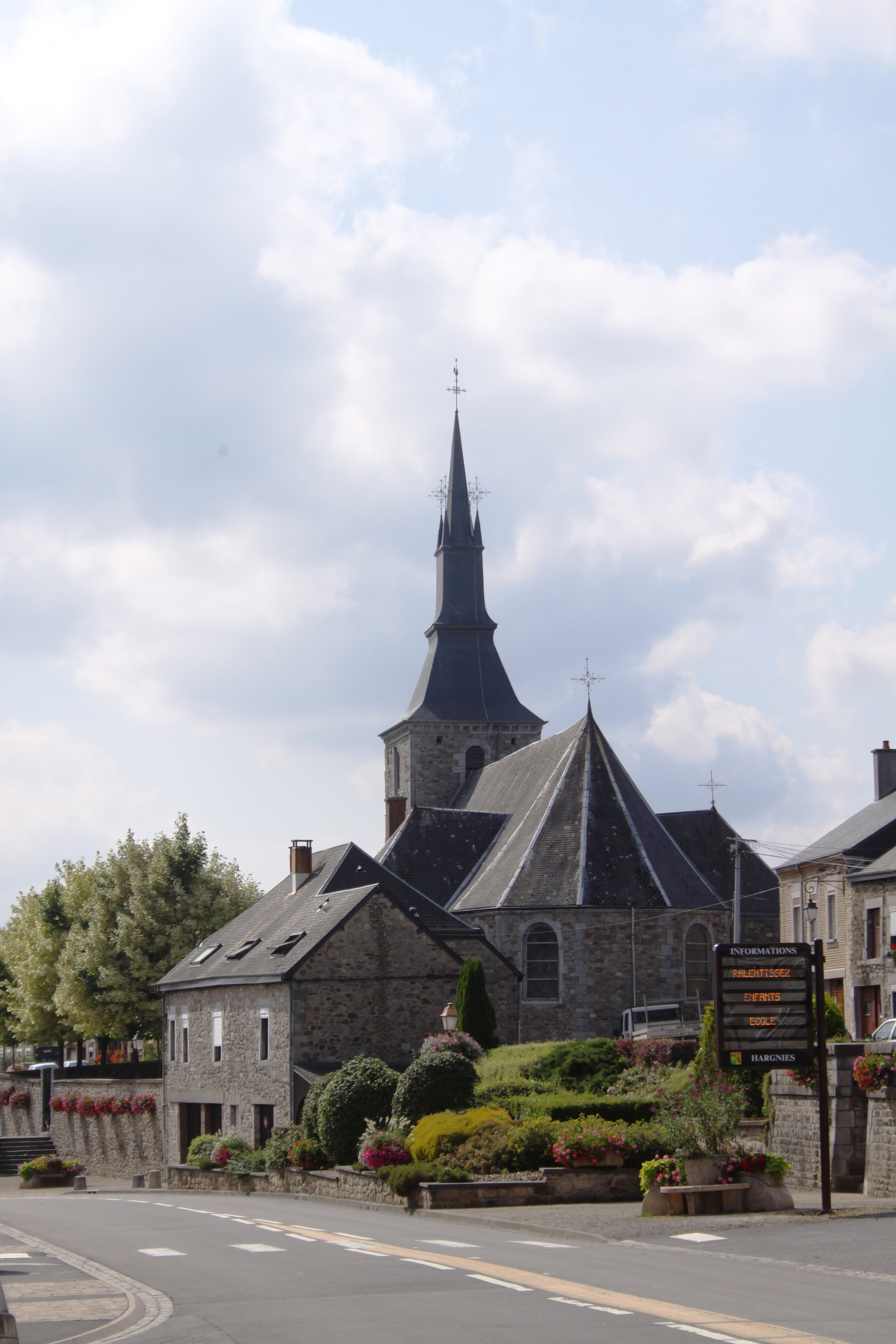
- The church in Hargnies

- Coat of arms
- Location of Hargnies
- Location within France Location within Grand Est
- Coordinates: 50°01′11″N 4°47′30″E
- Country: France
- Region: Grand Est
- Department: Ardennes
- Arrondissement: Charleville-Mézières
- Canton: Revin
- Intercommunality: Ardenne Rives de Meuse

Government
  - Mayor (2020–2026): Bernard Deforge
- Area^{1}: 42.24 km^{2} (16.31 sq mi)
- Elevation: 312 m (1,024 ft)
- Population (2023): 435
  - Density: 10.3/km^{2} (26.7/sq mi)
- Time zone: UTC+01:00 (CET)
  - Summer (DST): UTC+02:00 (CEST)
- INSEE/Postal code: 08214 /08170
- ^{1} French Land Register data, which excludes lakes, ponds, glaciers > 1 km^{2} (0.386 sq mi or 247 acres) and river estuaries.

Hargnies (French pronunciation: [aʁɲi]) is a commune in the Ardennes department in northern France.

== Population ==
Historical population
Year	Pop.	±% p.a.
1968	623	—
1975	573	−1.19%
1982	561	−0.30%
1990	511	−1.16%
1999	514	+0.07%
2007	498	−0.39%
2012	466	−1.32%
2017	484	+0.76%
2023	435	−1.76%
Source: INSEE

== See also ==
- Communes of the Ardennes department
