= Fumay =

- Commune
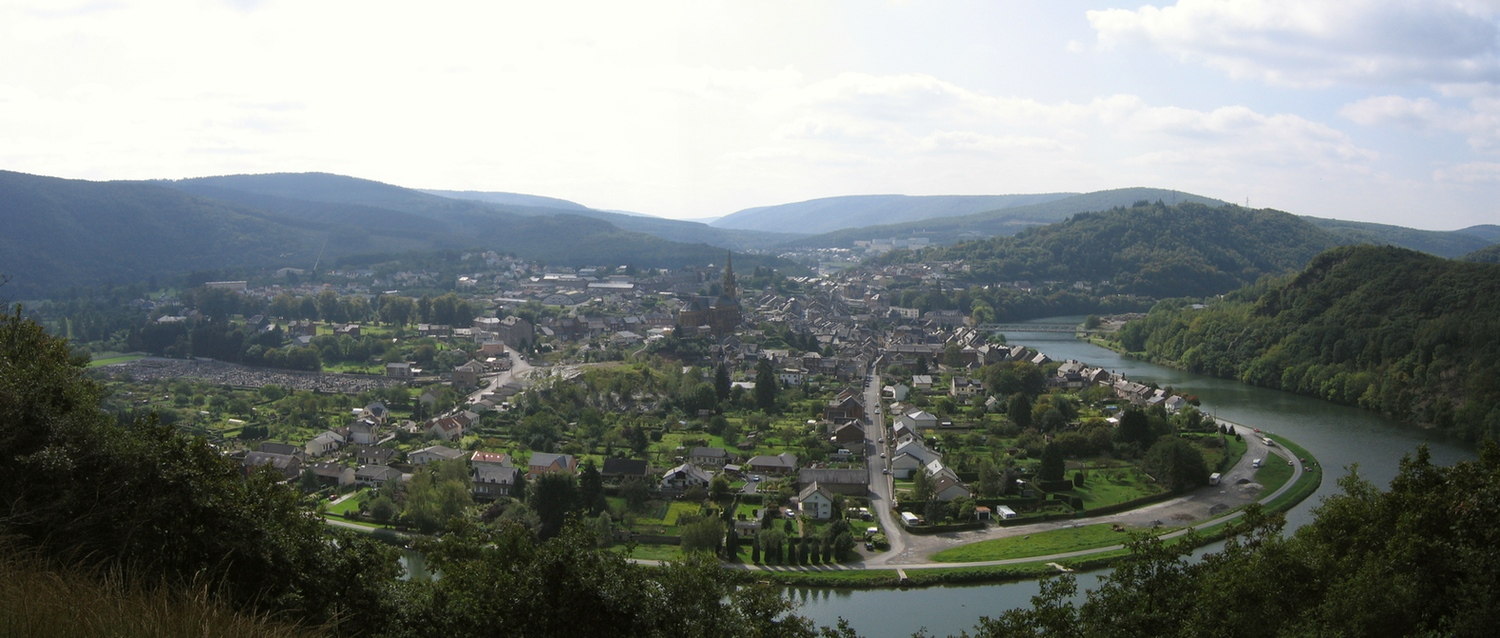
- A general view of Fumay

- Coat of arms
- Location of Fumay
- Location within France Location within Grand Est
- Coordinates: 49°59′39″N 4°42′27″E
- Country: France
- Region: Grand Est
- Department: Ardennes
- Arrondissement: Charleville-Mézières
- Canton: Revin
- Intercommunality: Ardenne Rives de Meuse

Government
  - Mayor (2020–2026): Mathieu Sonnet
- Area^{1}: 37.56 km^{2} (14.50 sq mi)
- Elevation: 127 m (417 ft)
- Highest elevation: 255 m (837 ft)
- Lowest elevation: 116 m (381 ft)
- Population (2023): 3,086
  - Density: 82.16/km^{2} (212.8/sq mi)
- Time zone: UTC+01:00 (CET)
  - Summer (DST): UTC+02:00 (CEST)
- INSEE/Postal code: 08185 /08170
- ^{1} French Land Register data, which excludes lakes, ponds, glaciers > 1 km^{2} (0.386 sq mi or 247 acres) and river estuaries.

Fumay (French pronunciation: [fymɛ]) is a commune in the Ardennes department in northern France, very close to the Belgian border. The engineer Charles-Hippolyte de Paravey was born in Fumay.

== Geography ==
It is situated in the Meuse valley, the main part of the town being surrounded by a large meander of the river.

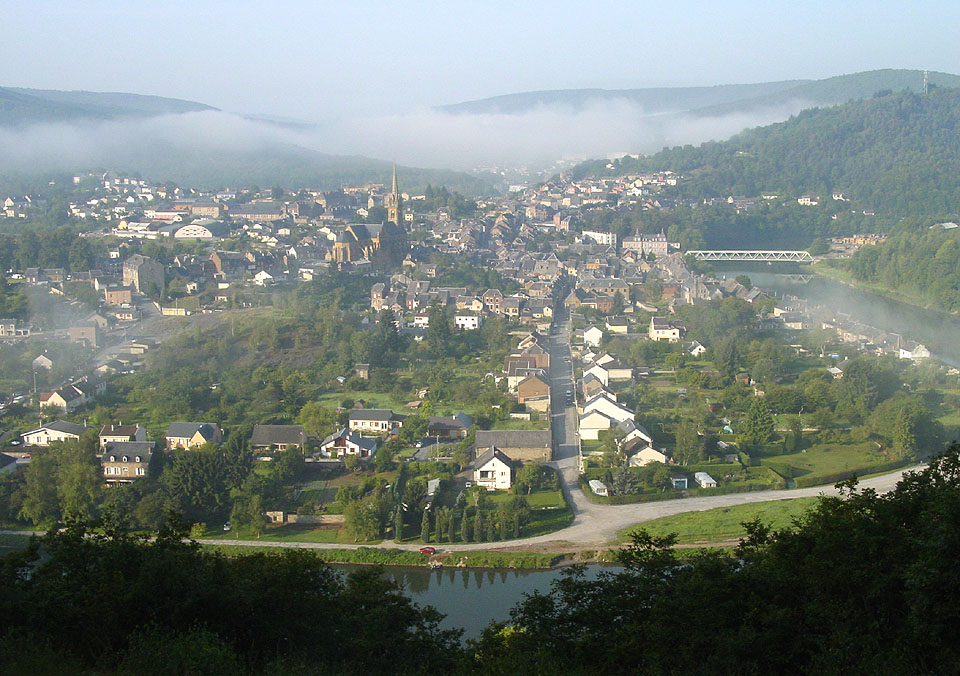
Fumay from the north-east

== Population ==
Historical population

Year	Pop.	±% p.a.
1793	1,815	—
1800	1,740	−0.60%
1806	1,950	+1.92%
1821	2,213	+0.85%
1831	2,421	+0.90%
1836	2,654	+1.85%
1841	2,903	+1.81%
1846	3,390	+3.15%
1851	3,447	+0.33%
1866	4,699	+2.09%
1872	4,565	−0.48%
1876	4,857	+1.56%
1881	5,231	+1.49%
1886	5,176	−0.21%
1891	5,065	−0.43%
1896	5,281	+0.84%
1901	5,668	+1.42%
1906	5,836	+0.59%

Year	Pop.	±% p.a.
1911	5,790	−0.16%
1921	4,789	−1.88%
1926	5,339	+2.20%
1931	5,376	+0.14%
1936	4,940	−1.68%
1946	4,013	−2.06%
1954	4,837	+2.36%
1962	6,185	+3.12%
1968	6,426	+0.64%
1975	6,147	−0.63%
1982	5,782	−0.87%
1990	5,363	−0.94%
1999	4,667	−1.53%
2007	3,986	−1.95%
2012	3,672	−1.63%
2017	3,481	−1.06%
2023	3,086	−1.99%

Source: EHESS and INSEE (1968-2023)

== Economy ==
Fumay is sometimes known as "The City of Slate" (La Cité de l'Ardoise) due to the slate mining which brought prosperity to the town in the nineteenth century. The last slate mine was closed in 1971.

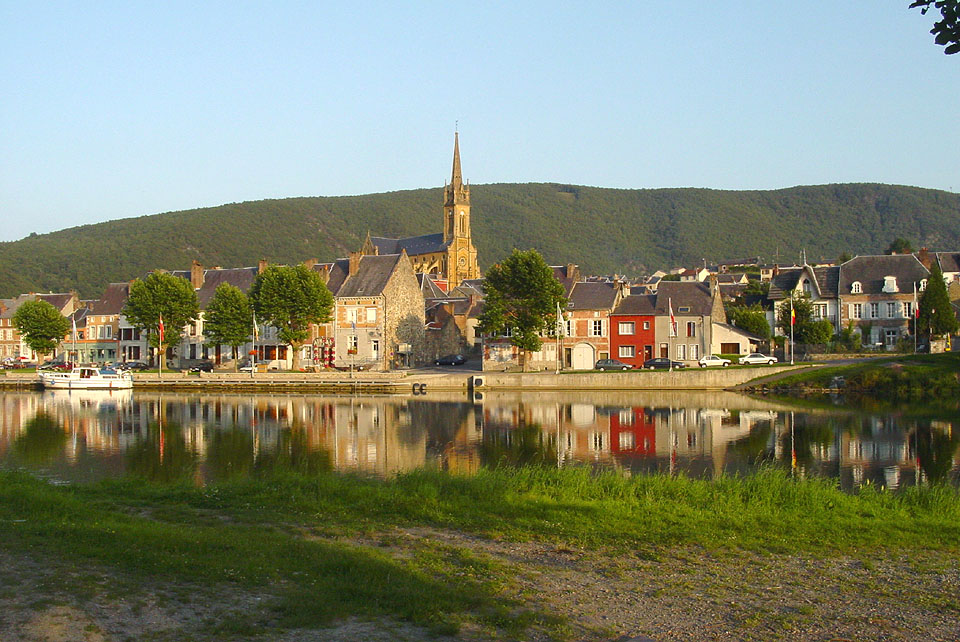
Fumay across the river

== See also ==
- Communes of the Ardennes department
