= Épinay Studios =

Film studios located in Paris

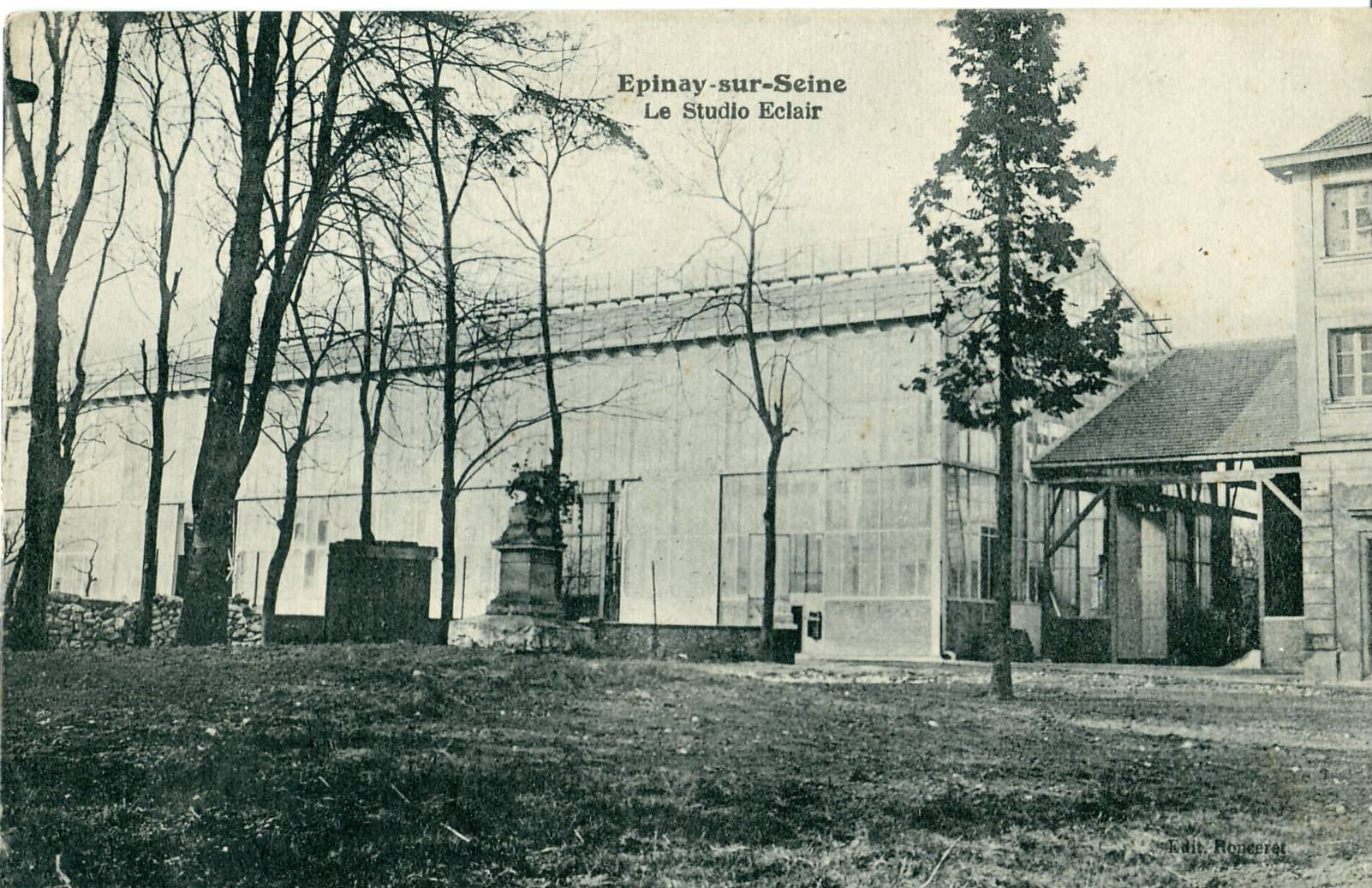
The early Eclair studio at Epinay

The Épinay Studios are film production studios located in Épinay-sur-Seine, in Seine-Saint-Denis, north of Paris. It is a complex with two distinct and separate structures on forty acres of land.

The launch of the Cité du Cinéma in 2012, also in Seine-Saint-Denis, greatly slowed down interest in the Épinay studios.

== History ==
The property was originally the residence of French naturalist Bernard Germain de Lacépède, and sometime after his death in 1825 it was purchased by the Éclair company. The earliest of its two structures was built in 1902 by Éclair. A second studio was controlled by the French subsidiary of the German company Tobis Film. These were converted for sound in February 1929. The same year the other studio was acquired by Pathé-Natan. At the end of October 1914, the movie Le Péché de Satan began filming on the studio grounds.

== Bibliography ==
- Crisp, C.G. The Classic French Cinema, 1930-1960. Indiana University Press, 1993
