= Eclair (company) =

Former film production company

- Industry: Motion picture production company
- Founded: 1907
- Headquarters: Paris-Vanves, France
- Number of locations: London, UK; Vanves, France; Berlin, Germany; New York City, USA; Karlsruhe, Germany; Madrid, Spain; Barcelona, Spain; Liège, Belgium; Rabat, Morocco
- Key people: Charles Jourjon

Eclair, formerly Laboratoires Éclair, began as a film production, film laboratory, and movie camera manufacturing company established in Épinay-sur-Seine, France by Charles Jourjon in 1907.

What remains of the business is a unit of Group Ymagis, offering creative and distribution services for the motion picture industries across Europe and North America such as editing, color grading, restoration, digital and theatrical delivery, and versioning. The company is currently made up of two entities: Eclair Cinema and Eclair Media.

== History ==
=== Founding ===
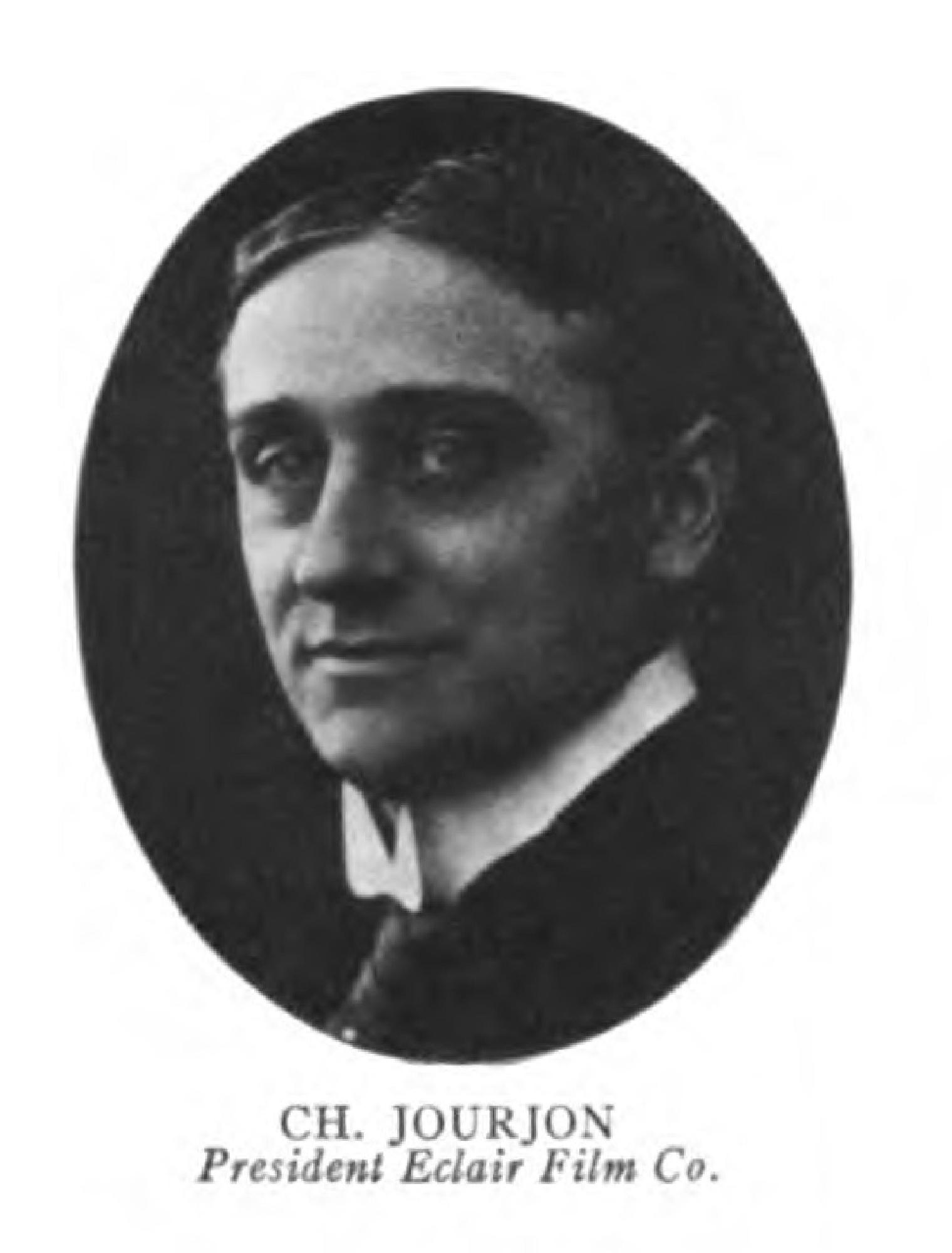
Charles Jourjon in 1914

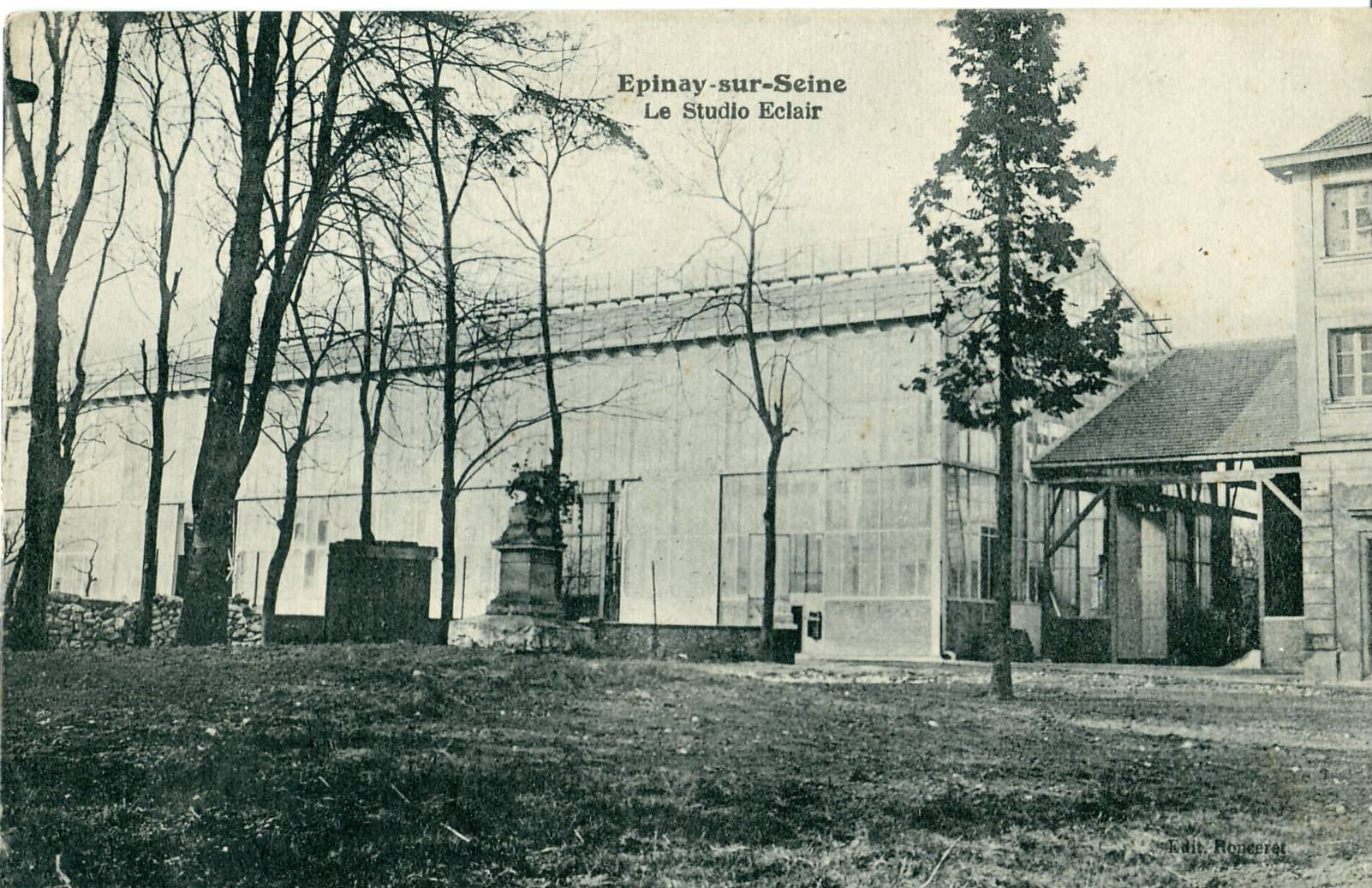
Glasshouse studio in Épinay-sur-Seine, originally built by Joseph Menchen

The company produced many silent shorts in France starting in 1908, and soon thereafter in America. The American division produced films from 1911-1914 such as Robin Hood, one of the first filmed versions of the classic story in 1912.

Deutsche Eclair, later Decla-Film, was established as its German studio branch. In 1909, Eclair took part in the Paris Film Congress, an attempt by major European producers to form a cartel similar to the MPPC in America.

Originally a film production company, Eclair started building cameras in 1912.

==== Selected French filmography ====
- 1910–1916: Willy series, over 70 film shorts featuring child actor Willy Sanders
- 1911: Zigomar

=== Studios in the United States ===
An Eclair studio, the Eclair Moving Picture Company, was established in Fort Lee, New Jersey. It suffered a devastating fire in 1914 in which many early film prints were lost. A western studio set was also established in Tucson, Arizona. Jules Brulatour was involved with the company and Dorothy Gibson one of its stars.

==== Eclair films made in Tucson ====
- Over the Cliffs, 1913
- The Reformation of Calliope, 1913
- The Aztec Treasure, 1914
- Mesquite Pete's Fortune, 1914
- At the Crucial Moment, 1914
- The Renunciation, 1914
- The Jackpot Club, 1914
- The Return, 1914
- The Cross in the Cacti, 1914
- The Dupe, 1914
- The Caballero's Way, 1914
- When Death Rode the Engine, 1914
- The Heart of Carita, 1914
- The Squatter, 1914
- Dead Men's Tales, 1914
- Within an Inch of His Life, 1914
- The Stirrup Brother; or, The Higher Abdication, 1914
- The Blunderer's Mark, 1914
- A Tale of the Desert, 1914
- The Bar Cross Liar, 1914
- The Ghost of the Mine, 1914
- Into the Foothills, 1914
- Fate's Finger, 1914
- Smallpox on the Circle U, 1914
- The Line Rider, 1914
- Till the Sands of the Desert Grow Cold, 1914
- Whom God Hath Joined, 1914
- The Girl Stage Driver, 1914
- The Jewel of Allah, 1914
- The Wondrous Melody, 1914
- The Price Paid, 1914
- The Yellow Streak, 1914
- The Devil Fox of the Orth, 1914
- The First Nugget, 1914
- The Bar Crossed Lier, 1914
- The Blunderer's Mark, 1914
- Terror, 1915
- The Thief and the Chief, 1915
- Saved by Telephone, 1915
- Romance in Bear Creek, 1915
- The Oath of Smoky Joe, 1915
- The Answer, 1915
- Lure of the West, 1915
- The Lone Game, 1915

=== The Zigomar Lawsuit ===
Between 1911 and 1913, Eclair released a series of films revolving around the fictional character Zigomar that had been created in 1909 by the French author Léon Sazie in the Paris-based newspaper Le Matin. The movies would go on to be very successful commercially, but Sazie came to feel that they were too different from his idea for the series, and so sued the director, Victorin-Hippolyte Jasset, and the Eclair company for excessive alteration of the source material. The courts ruled that 6,000 francs were to be paid to Sazie in damages, but Eclair appealed the case resulting in the amount to be paid increasing to 10,000 francs, with an additional 250 francs for any future violations.

=== Later company history ===
The company was acquired in late 1968 by UK-based Canadian film producer Harry Saltzman who then founded the Éclair-Debrie (UK) Ltd. company and moved production to the United Kingdom. Meanwhile, Soremec-Cehess took over the French side of the company and resumed production in France, so English Eclair cameras (similar to the French product with minor differences), were manufactured simultaneously for a few years until Éclair-Debrie (UK) Ltd ceased activities in 1973. Production then continued in France with a good degree of success, but the company eventually declined in the late-1970s and early-1980s until it was eventually sold to Aaton S.A. in 1986 who ceased all camera production, offering only a license for maintenance of the many existing cameras.

The film processing and post-production side of Éclair continues to operate.

== Cameras ==
Among their early models was the Caméréclair of 1928, then the Camé 300 Réflex, both successful studio cameras. Their real breakthrough design, the Caméflex (shoulder-held portable 35 mm camera with instant-change magazines, with later 16/35 mm dual format option) introduced in 1947, played a major part in the French New Wave by allowing for a freer form of shooting 35 mm fiction films.

Later 16 mm silent models such as the 1960 Eclair NPR (aka "Eclair 16" or "Eclair Coutant") and the 1971 Eclair ACL were documentary cinema favorites. The NPR also saw considerable use in television production and was the standard camera used by 16 mm film crews in the BBC's Film Department. Due to its light weight and ergonomic design, which housed the film spools at the back of the camera rather than on top, the NPR was seen as a considerable improvement over its predecessors. For 16 mm cameramen out in the field, this ease of use and maneuverability was vital to capture the right shot, often in hostile conditions. NPR stands for Noiseless Portable Reflex and ACL comes from the letters of the names of its designers Agusti (Austin) Coma and Jacques Lecoeur. The last models designed by Eclair in the early-1980s came too late to save the company from bankruptcy and were hardly produced, if at all: the Eclair EX16 (similar to ACL with fixed viewfinder and 24/25fps fixed motor) and the Eclair PANORAM (first dual format 16+Super16 camera with "Varigate" system).

The instant clip-on design of the camera magazine of the Caméflex and later the NPR, ACL, EX16 and PANORAM models' coaxial pre-threaded loop magazines revolutionized filmmaking, in particular documentary films, since magazine changes could now be made in seconds without the need to spend time threading the film through the camera. The ACL model used a focal plane shutter for exposure and a side-to-side oscillating mirror for reflex viewing to keep the camera body size to a minimum.

=== Famous camera users ===
Jean-Luc Godard used an Eclair Cameflex when filming Breathless in 1959. Godard wished to film using ambient light, and the Cameflex was the only motion picture camera capable of using ASA 400 35 mm Ilford HPS still camera film. Cinematographer Raoul Coutard spliced the 18 meter still camera rolls into 120 meter rolls for use as motion picture film, and pushed it to ASA 800 during development. A handheld Eclair camera was used in the shower scene in the 1960 film Psycho.

An Eclair 16 was used by L.M. Kit Carson (and discussed, on camera) in Jim McBride's ground-breaking film, David Holzman's Diary (1967). Two years later, the NPR was chosen by director Michael Wadleigh to shoot his documentary Woodstock. Wadleigh used sixteen NPR cameras. In Woodstock: From Festival to Feature, he explained some of the challenges he faced using a then seven-year-old camera in a manner that would have been unheard of for 35 mm movie cameras, let alone the relatively untried NPR.
