= Dr. Jack =

1922 film

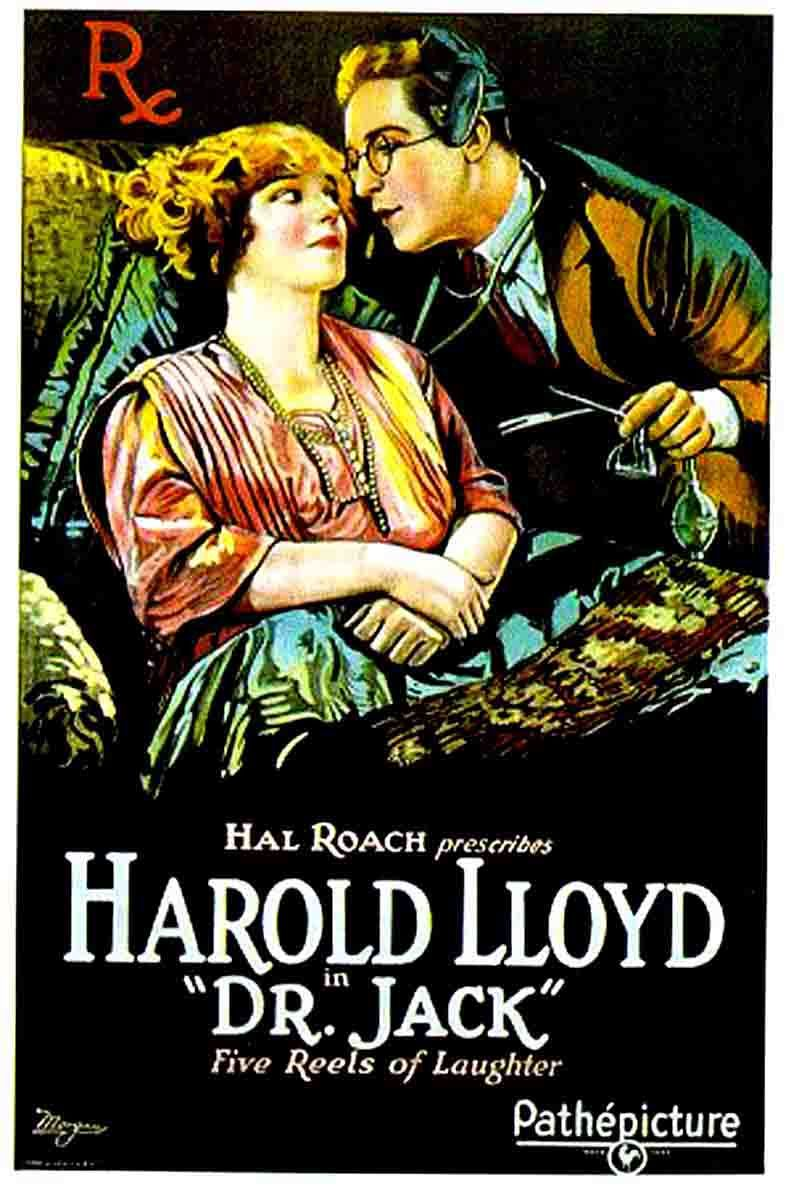
- Theatrical release poster
- Directed by: Fred C. Newmeyer
- Written by: Hal Roach; Sam Taylor; Jean C. Havez; H. M. Walker
- Produced by: Hal Roach (uncredited)
- Starring: Harold Lloyd; Mildred Davis
- Cinematography: Walter Lundin
- Edited by: Thomas J. Crizer
- Production company: Hal Roach Studios
- Distributed by: Pathé Distributors
- Release date: November 26, 1922
- Running time: 60 minutes
- Country: United States
- Language: Silent (English intertitles)
- Budget: $113,440

Dr. Jack (1922) by Fred C. Newmeyer

Dr. Jack is a 1922 American silent comedy film starring Harold Lloyd. It was produced by Hal Roach and directed by Fred C. Newmeyer. The story was by Jean Havez, Hal Roach, and Sam Taylor. The film was released on November 26, 1922. Grossing $1,275,423, Dr. Jack was one of the top-ten most profitable releases of 1922.

== Plot ==
As described in a film magazine, young Dr. Jackson, or Dr. Jack, has plenty of practice but scant fees. He believes in using sunshine methods and avoids medicine as far as possible. This is quite contrary to the methods employed by the renowned Dr. Ludwig von Saulsbourg, who for four years has reaped a golden harvest out of the father of the Sick-Little-Well-Girl, keeping the latter in dark rooms and feeding her drugs without end. The family lawyer Jamison introduces Dr. Jack as a consultant and things begin to happen. Dr. Jack has met the Girl once accidentally, and is overjoyed when he is called to prescribe for her, a proceeding that results in both falling in love. Caught kissing the Girl, Dr. Jack falls into disgrace and is told that he must leave the next morning. In the meantime, news that a dangerous lunatic has escaped and has been seen in the vicinity of the house reaches its occupants. Dr. Jack, who holds that a little excitement is all the patient needs to make her perfectly normal, arranges a night alarm for the occupants of the home. He dons a wig and hat and, thus disguised, makes unexpected appearances in various parts of the establishment, throwing everybody into spasms of momentary terror. In the long run he reveals himself to the Girl, her father realizes that she is cured, von Saulsbourg is required to make an undignified exit, and the two lovers are happy.

== Cast ==
- Harold Lloyd as Dr. Jackson - "Jack" for short
- Mildred Davis as The Sick-Little-Well-Girl
- John T. Prince as Her Father
- Eric Mayne as Dr. Ludwig von Saulsbourg
- Norman Hammond as Jamison The Lawyer
- Charles Stevenson as The Asylum Guard

== Background ==
Dr. Jack is an upbeat gag-driven film, played solely for laughs. Released between the sensitive, complex character comedy of Grandma's Boy and the daredevil "thrill picture" Safety Last!, it was Lloyd's first intentional five-reeler, whereas his two previous features, A Sailor-Made Man, and Grandma's Boy, both grew from two-reelers to five-reelers during the actual shooting.

== Preservation status ==
Prints of Dr. Jack exist in the collection of the UCLA Film & Television Archive and the British Film Institute's National Film Archive.

== See also ==
- Harold Lloyd filmography
