= Anna Townsend =

American actress

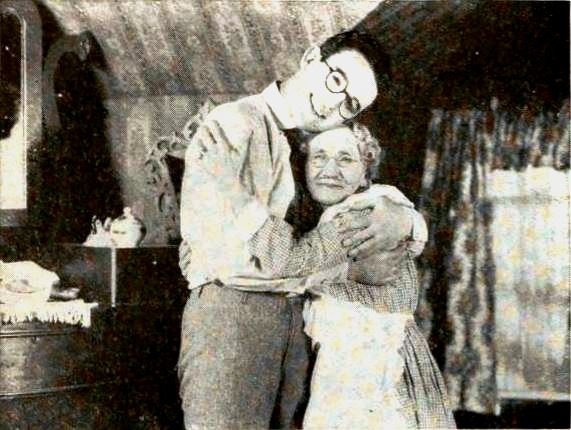
- Townsend (right) with Harold Lloyd in Grandma's Boy
- Born: January 5, 1845; Utica, New York
- Died: September 11, 1923 (aged 78); Los Angeles, California, US
- Occupation: Actress
- Years active: 1913-1923
- Children: 1

Mrs. Anna Townsend (January 5, 1845 – September 11, 1923) was a silent film actress who first turned to acting as a career very late in life. Featured in several Harold Lloyd films, Townsend is probably best known for her role as Harold's good-hearted grandmother in Grandma's Boy (1922). That film was developed around Townsend's personality.

== Early life and career ==
Townsend was born in Utica, New York. She moved from there to Los Angeles in 1885. Her film career began in 1919.

According to a 1922 profile published in the Los Angeles Evening Express, Townsend's sole acting experience prior to her brief silent screen heyday was an even briefer pre-Civil War tour of duty with the Holman Light Opera Company. This was in large part corroborated the following year by the Sacramento Bee, whose obituary for Townsend states that the actress's emergence "three years ago" constituted the first time "she [had] ever considered pursuing acting as a profession."

== Personal life and death ==
Married at least once and predeceased by her husband, Mrs. Townsend died on September 11, 1923, at her home in Los Angeles, apparently due to an unspecified illness contracted two months earlier while sightseeing at Yosemite National Park.

She was survived, at the very least, by one grown child, a daughter. Moreover, judging from a profile of Townsend published that spring, in which references made to both "grown-up children" and "grandchildren" figure prominently, there were almost certainly additional survivors.

== Filmography ==
Film
Year	Film	Role	Notes
1913	The Hoyden's Awakening	Unknown role (as Mrs. Anna Townsend)	
1914	The Real Thing in Cowboys	Mrs. Mitchell	
1917	A Marked Man	Harry's Mother (as Mrs. Townsend)	Lost film
1918	Three Mounted Men	Harry's Mother (as Mrs. Anna Townsend)	Lost film
1921	Beyond the Trail	Unknown role	Uncredited
1922	Grandma's Boy	His Grandma	
1922	Dr. Jack	Jamison's Mother	Uncredited
1923	Daddy	Mrs. Holden	
1923	Safety Last!	very small woman at the Sale	Uncredited
Television
Year	Title	Role	Notes
1989	American Masters	Harold's Grandmother in 'Grandma's Boy'	Archive footage, posthumously release, episode: "Harold Lloyd: The Third Genius"
