= Dick Sutherland =

American actor (1881–1934)

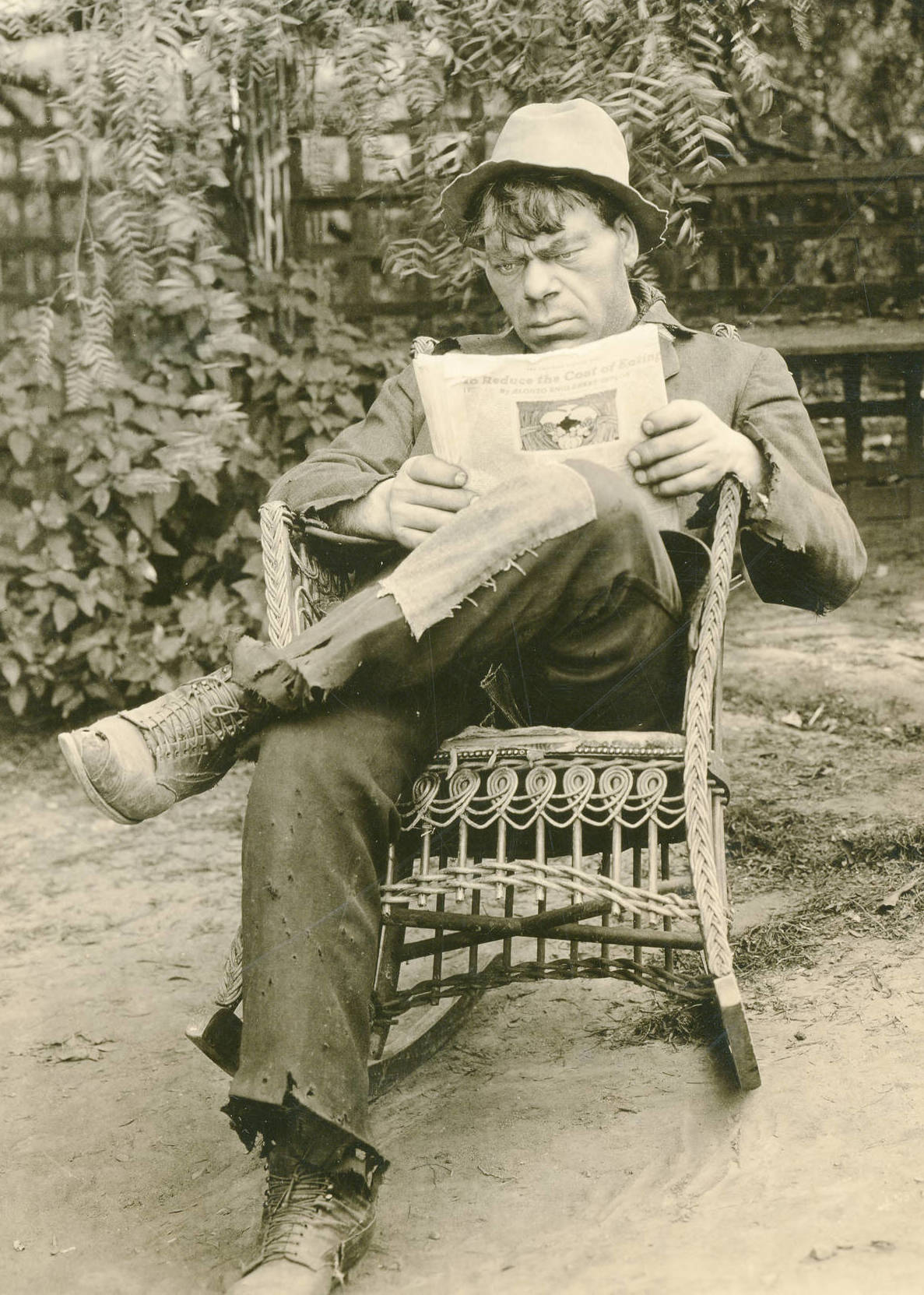
- Sutherland in 1922
- Born: Archibald Thomas Johnson; December 23, 1881; Benton, Kentucky, U.S.
- Died: February 3, 1934 (aged 52); Hollywood, California, U.S.
- Resting place: Inglewood Park Cemetery
- Occupation: Actor
- Years active: 1921–1932

Dick Sutherland (born Archibald Thomas Johnson, December 23, 1881 – February 3, 1934) was an American film actor, active mostly during the silent film era. Born in Benton, Kentucky, in 1881, Sutherland appeared in more than 70 films between 1921 and 1932. Sutherland died at his home in Hollywood, California, from a heart attack, at the age of 52. He had a wife, Verba, and three sons, Harry, Everett, and Lester. He is interred at Inglewood Park Cemetery. His distinctive facial features were a result of acromegaly.

== Partial filmography ==
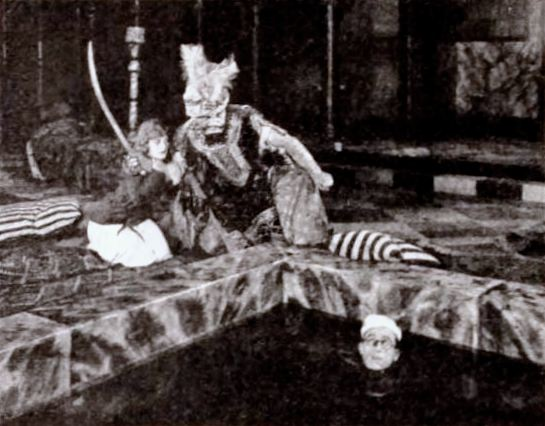
Sutherland (center) with Mildred Davis and Harold Lloyd (in water), A Sailor-Made Man (1921)

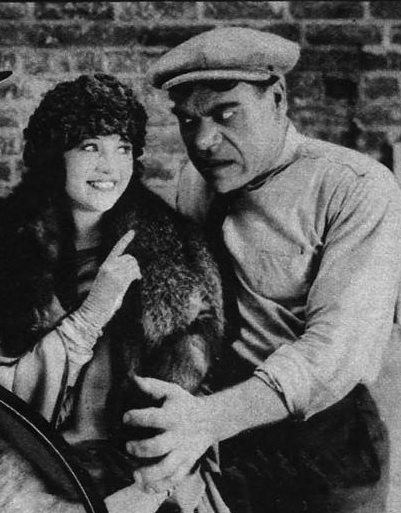
Betty Compson and Dick Sutherland

Year	Title
1921	The Foolish Matrons; A Sailor-Made Man; The Magnificent Brute

Year	Title
1922	Rags to Riches; Grandma's Boy; The Deuce of Spades

Year	Title
1923	The Phantom Fortune; Masters of Men; His Last Race

Year	Title
1924	Battling Mason; The Red Lily; Men; The Dangerous Blonde; The Tornado; The Mask of Lopez; Defying the Law

Year	Title
1925	Excuse Me; Jimmie's Millions; With This Ring; Zander the Great; The Fighting Demon; Spook Ranch; The Fighting Dude; The Flying Fool

Year	Title
1926	Don Juan; Broken Hearts of Hollywood; Twinkletoes; The Jazz Girl

Year	Title
1927	When a Man Loves; The Beloved Rogue; Uncle Tom's Cabin; The Battle of the Century

Year	Title
1928	The Viking

Year	Title
1929	The Hoose-Gow; Wild Orchids

Year	Title
1932	Chandu the Magician (1932)
