= I Do (1921 film) =

1921 film by Hal Roach

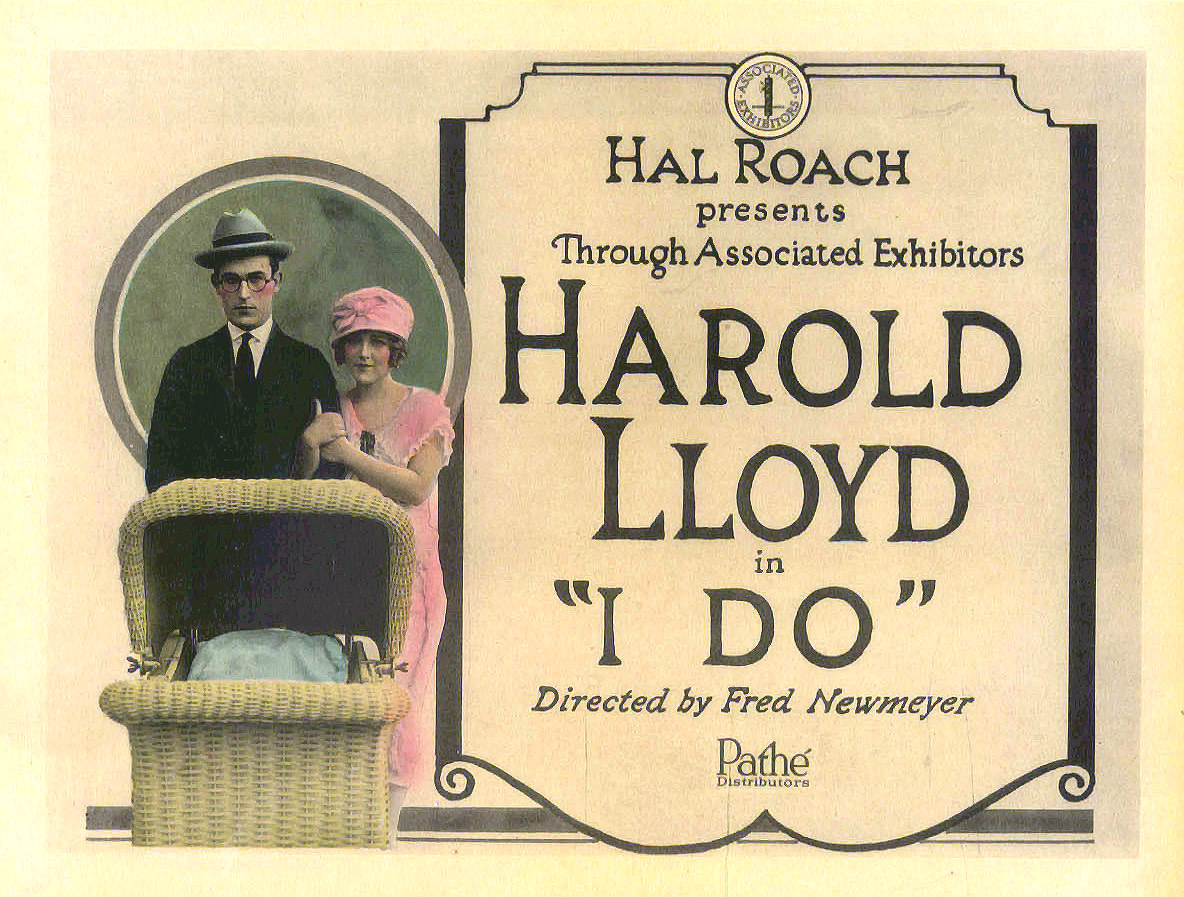
- Lobby card
- Directed by: Hal Roach
- Written by: Hal Roach, Sam Taylor
- Produced by: Hal Roach
- Starring: Harold Lloyd
- Edited by: Charles Bilkey
- Distributed by: Pathé Exchange
- Release date: September 11, 1921
- Running time: 26 minutes
- Country: United States
- Language: Silent (English intertitles)

I Do is a 1921 American short comedy film featuring Harold Lloyd. This short is notable for having a cartoon wedding in the first scene.

== Plot ==
The film

The Boy meets and marries The Girl. A year later, the two walk down the street with a baby carriage carrying a bottle instead of a baby when they run into The Girl's brother, who asks the couple to do him a favor and babysit his children. They accept and the remainder of the short consists of gags showcasing the difficulties of babysitting children. At the very end, The Boy discovers some knitted baby clothes in a drawer (implying that The Girl is pregnant).

== Cast ==
- Harold Lloyd as The Boy
- Mildred Davis as The Girl
- Noah Young as The Agitation
- Jackie Morgan as The Disturbance
- Jackie Edwards as The Annoyance
- Irene De Voss

== See also ==
- Harold Lloyd filmography
