= A Sailor-Made Man =

1921 film by Fred C. Newmeyer

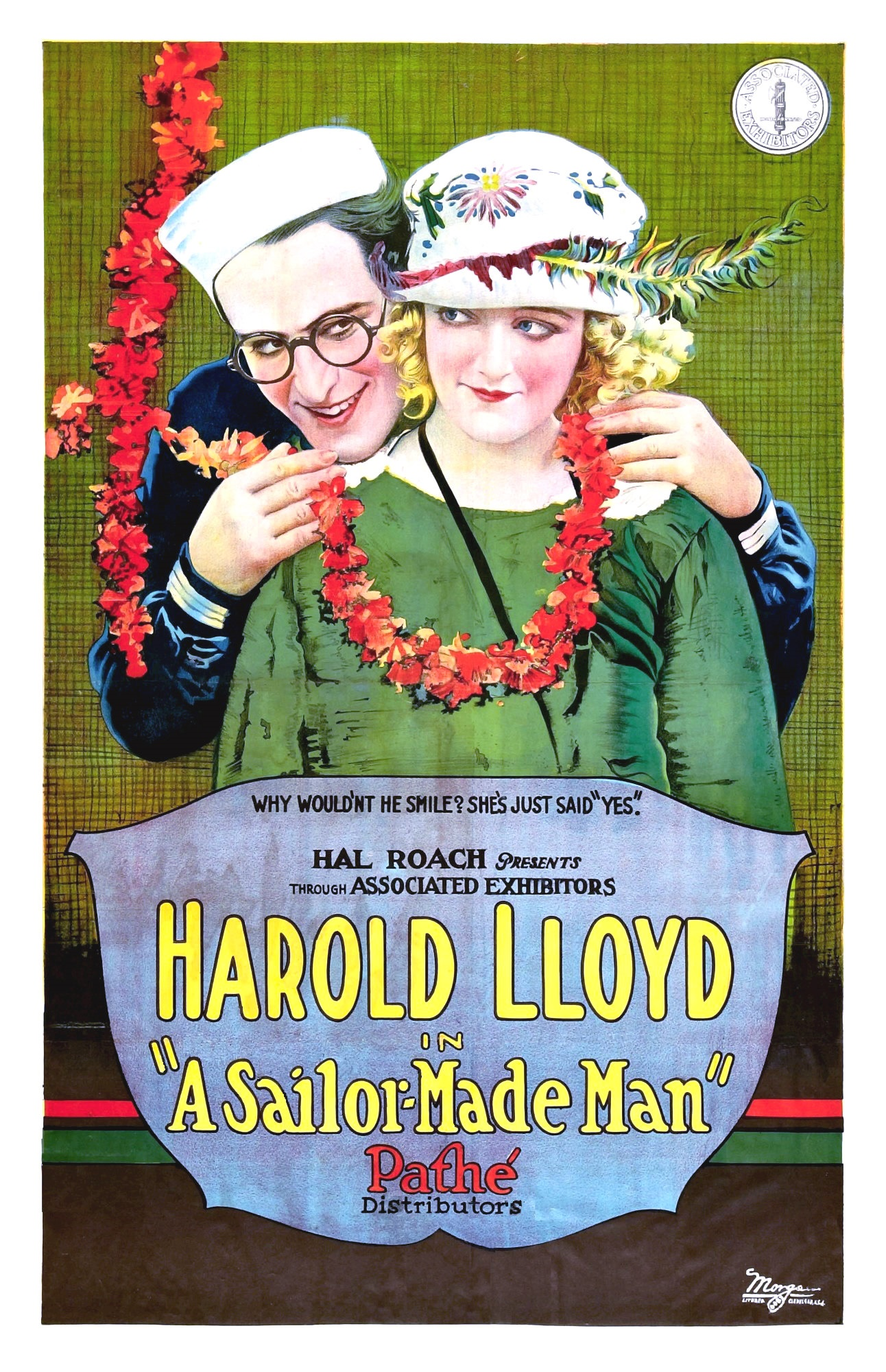
- Theatrical release poster
- Directed by: Fred C. Newmeyer
- Written by: Jean Havez; Hal Roach; Sam Taylor; H. M. Walker
- Produced by: Hal Roach
- Starring: Harold Lloyd
- Cinematography: Walter Lundin
- Edited by: Thomas J. Crizer
- Distributed by: Associated Exhibitors
- Release date: December 25, 1921
- Running time: 47 minutes
- Country: United States
- Language: Silent (English intertitles)
- Budget: $77,315

A Sailor-Made Man is a 1921 American silent comedy film directed by Fred Newmeyer and starring Harold Lloyd.

== Plot ==
A Sailor-Made Man (1921)

"The Boy" is an idle playboy and heir to $20,000,000, relaxing at an exclusive resort. When he sees "The Girl", surrounded by a flock of admirers, he suddenly asks her to marry him. Taken aback, she sends him to get the approval of her father, a tough, hardworking steel magnate. The girl's father knows and disapproves of the Boy's indolence, and demands that he first get a job to prove that he can do something. The Boy sees a recruiting poster and applies to join the United States Navy. When the magnate decides to take a long cruise on his yacht, he tells his daughter to bring along her friends. She invites the Boy, but he finds he cannot get out of his three-year enlistment.

Aboard ship, he makes an enemy of intimidating sailor "Rough-House" O'Rafferty, but when O'Rafferty throws a box at the Boy and strikes a passing officer, the Boy steps up and accepts the blame. He and O'Rafferty then become good friends.

The Girl and her friends stop off at the port of Agar Shahar Khairpura, the "City of a Thousand Rascals," in the country of Khairpura-Bhandanna, to sightsee, just as the Boy and O'Rafferty get shore leave there. The Girl is delighted to see the Boy and rushes into his arms. However, she has also attracted the attention of the Maharajah of Khairpura-Bhandanna. The potentate has her kidnapped and taken to his palace. The Boy rushes to her rescue and single-handedly manages to outwit the Maharajah and his guards and escape with the Girl.

Later, the Boy uses signal flags from his ship to communicate with the Girl on her father's yacht and ask, "Will you?" With her father's approval, she sends a signal back, "I will."

== Cast ==
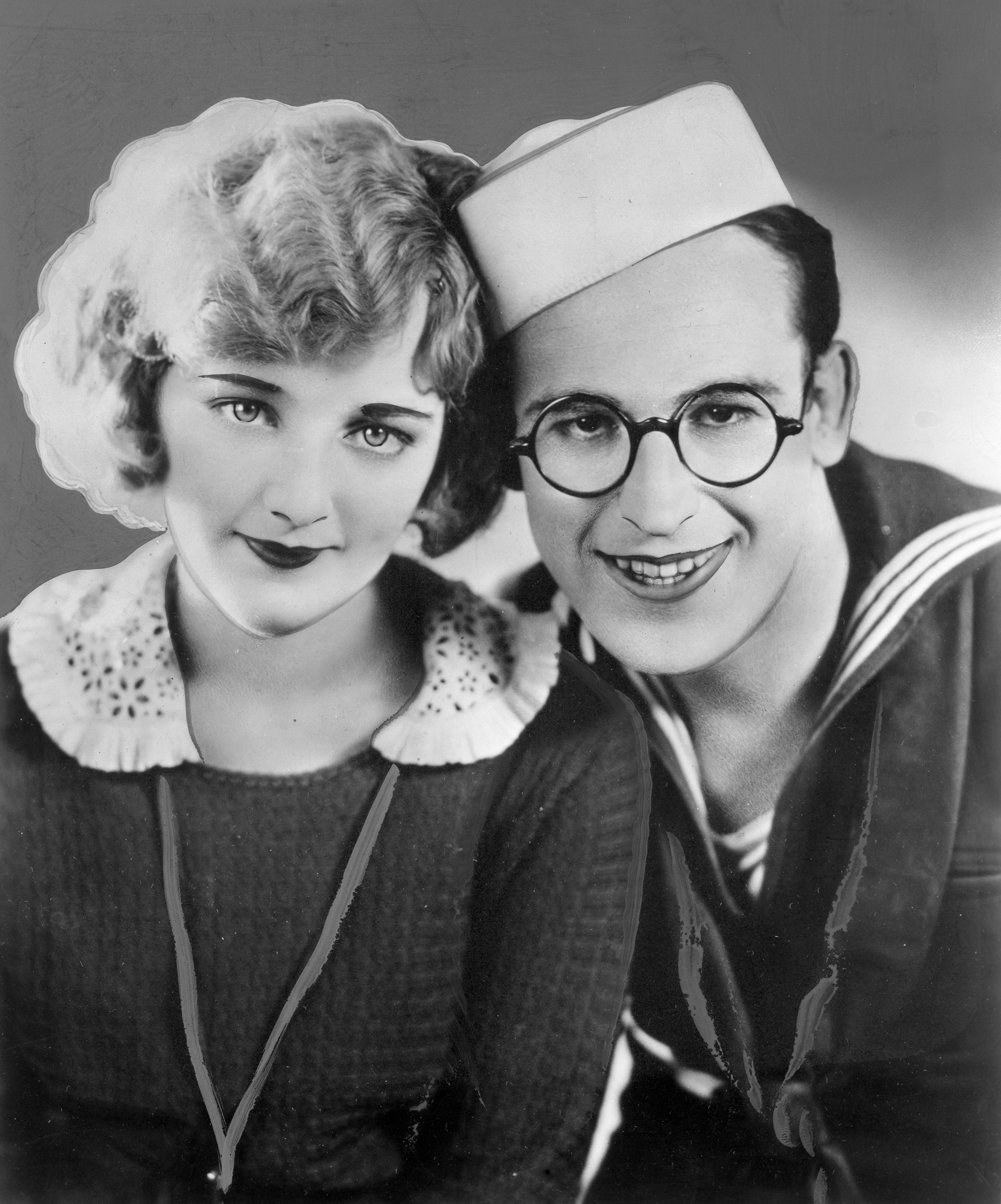
Promotional photo with Harold Lloyd and a cardboard cutout of Mildred Davis

- Harold Lloyd - The Boy
- Mildred Davis - The Girl
- Noah Young - The Rowdy Element
- Dick Sutherland - The Maharajah Of Khairpura-Bhandanna

== Production ==
Considered to be Lloyd's first feature-length film, the extended running time of A Sailor-Made Man came about purely by accident. During production, with an excessive number of gags written into the story, it became apparent that the film would be longer than the traditional two-reel short. Producer Hal Roach decided they should just go ahead and shoot everything they had come up with, and worry about cutting down the length later. Often dependent on the preview process, Lloyd decided to preview the film at its 40-plus minute length to see which parts did not work. However, the audiences enjoyed the extended cut so much, Lloyd decided not to change a thing and kept it as a four-reel comedy.

The title of the film is a pun on the title of the popular 1917 play A Tailor-Made Man, which itself would be made into a film one year after A Sailor-Made Man was released.

== Music ==
In 2012, the Dallas Chamber Symphony commissioned composer Brian Satterwhite to compose an original musical score for A Sailor-Made Man. It premiered during a concert screening at Moody Performance Hall on November 12, 2012 with Richard McKay conducting.

== Reception ==
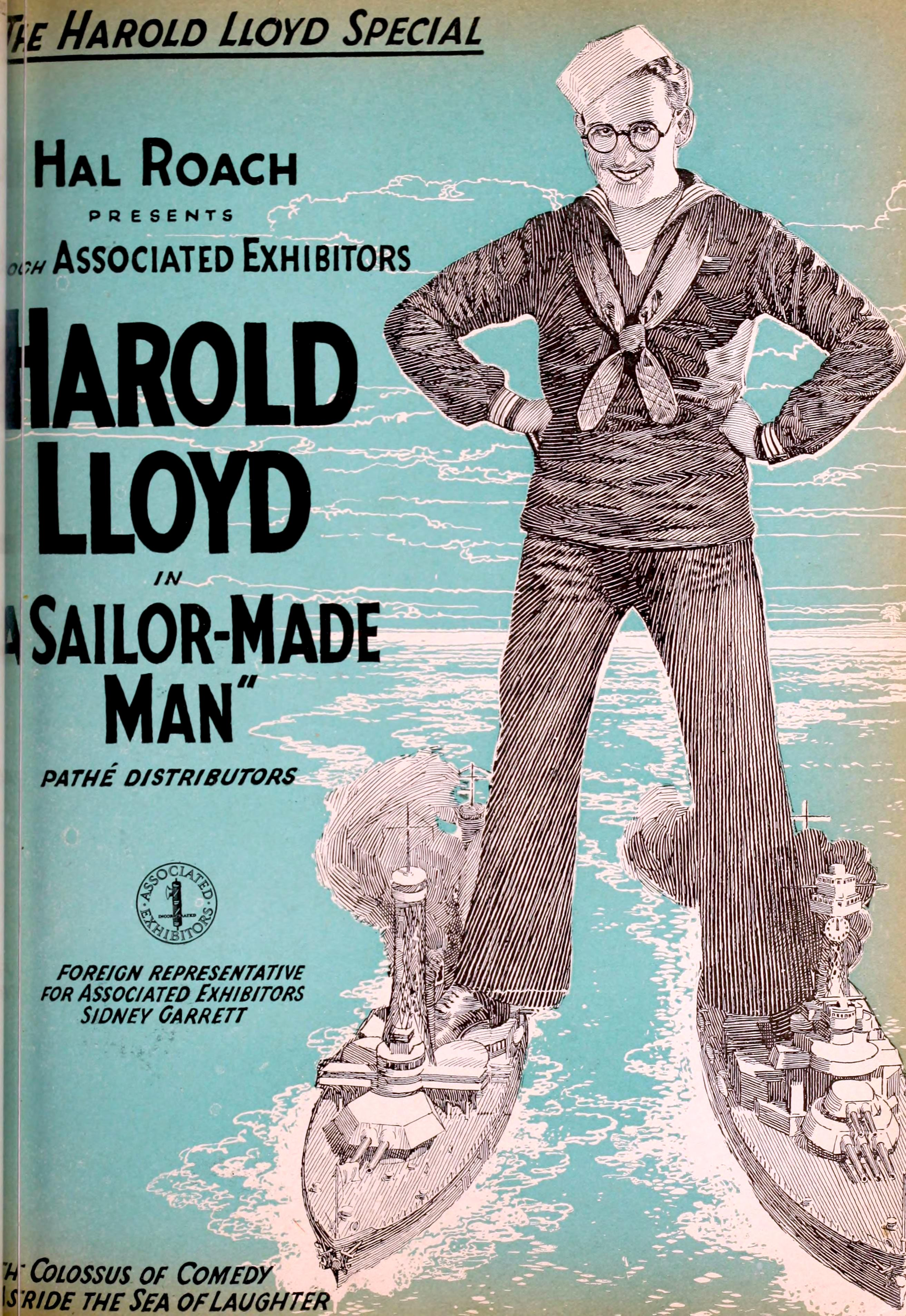
1921 ad

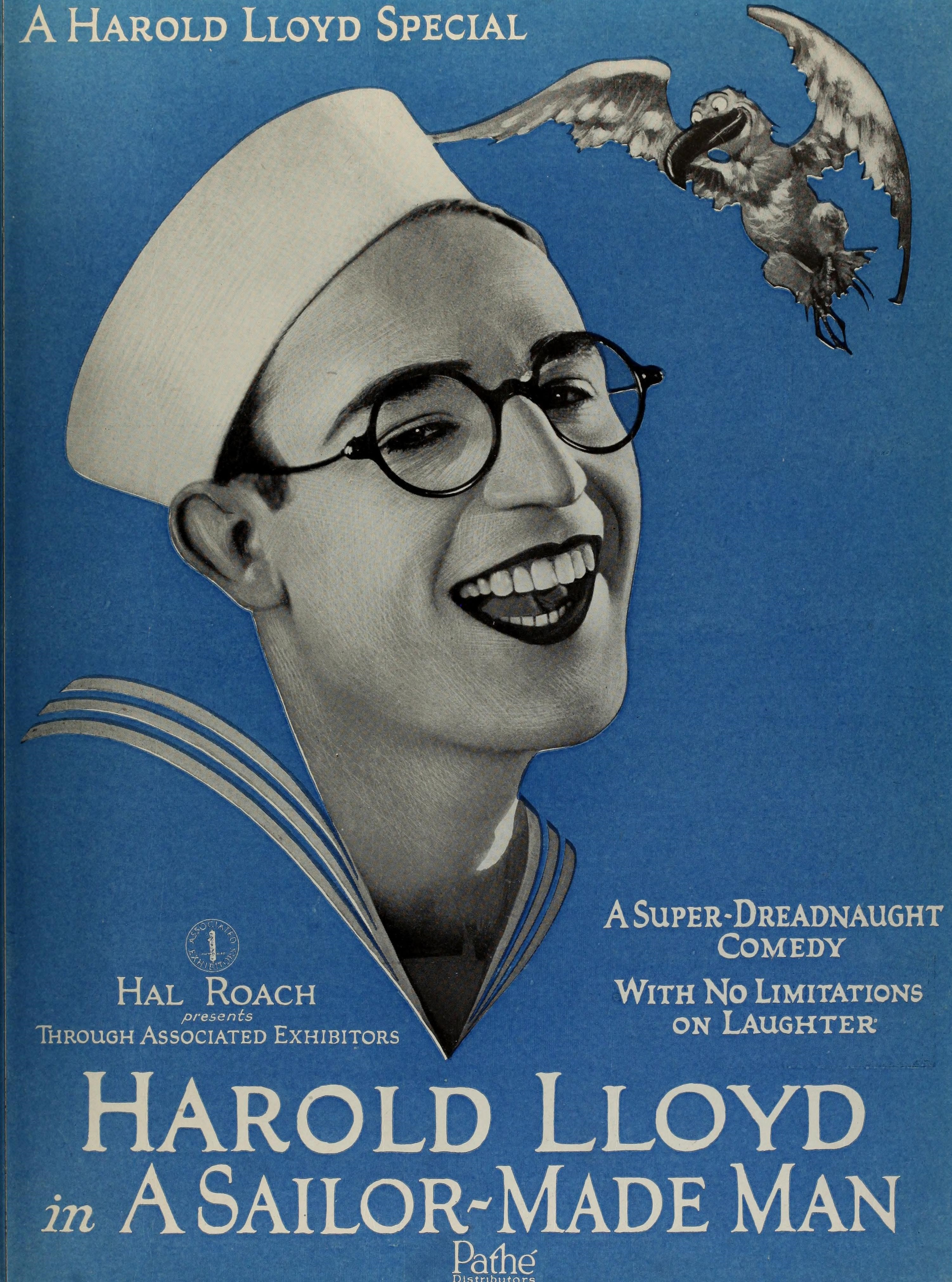
A Sailor-Made Man advertisement from Film Daily

"It is a riot of fun," said a reviewer for Photoplay, "and boasts a first-rate story, too. He can ever be depended on to add fresh material to his laughing-stock. Mildred Davis is, as always, a pleasing foil."

Against a budget of just over $77,000, A Sailor-Made Man grossed $485,285, making it a surprise hit.

== See also ==
- Harold Lloyd filmography
