= Grandma's Boy =

Grandma's Boy may refer to:

- Grandma's Boy (1922 film)
- Grandma's Boy (2006 film)
