= Temporary Marriage =

1923 film directed by Lambert Hillyer

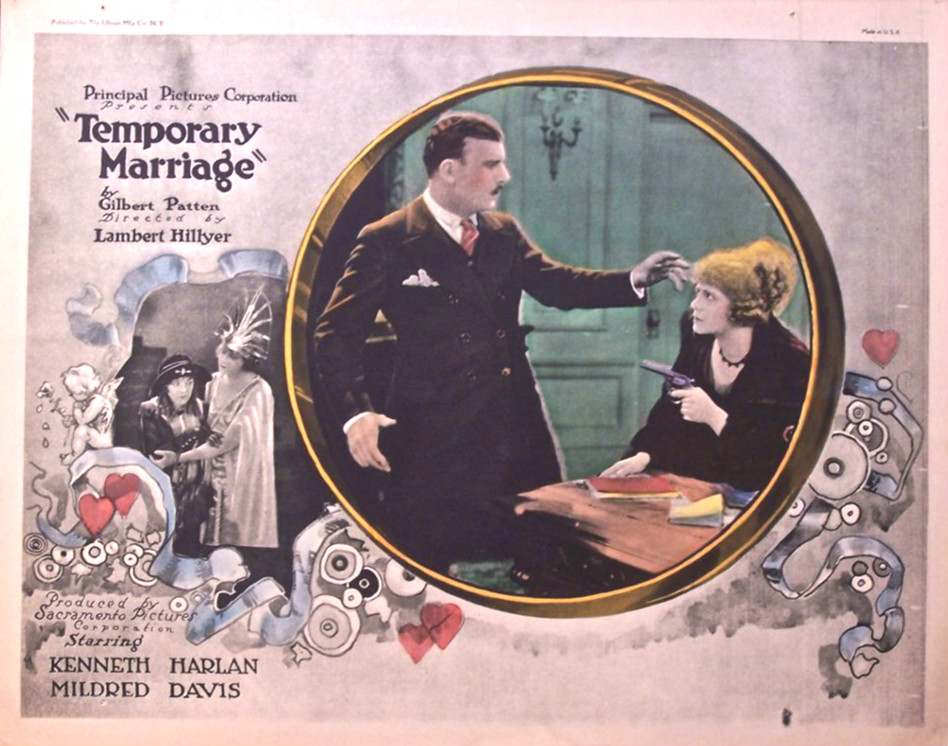
- Lobby card
- Directed by: Lambert Hillyer
- Written by: Lambert Hillyer; Gilbert Patten
- Starring: Kenneth Harlan; Mildred Davis; Myrtle Stedman
- Cinematography: John Stumar
- Production company: Sacramento Pictures
- Distributed by: Principal Distributing
- Release date: June 30, 1923
- Running time: 70 minutes
- Country: United States
- Language: Silent (English intertitles)

Temporary Marriage is a lost 1923 American silent drama film directed by Lambert Hillyer and starring Kenneth Harlan, Mildred Davis, and Myrtle Stedman.

== Cast ==
- Kenneth Harlan as Robert Belmar
- Mildred Davis as Hazel Manners
- Myrtle Stedman as Mrs. Hugh Manners
- Tully Marshall as Hugh Manners, a lawyer
- Maude George as Olga Kazanoff, an adventuress
- Stuart Holmes as Preston Ducayne, a gambler
- Edward Coxen as Prosecuting Attorney

== Preservation ==
With no holdings located in archives, Temporary Marriage is considered a lost film.

== Bibliography ==
- Annette M. D'Agostino. Harold Lloyd: A Bio-bibliography. Greenwood Press, 1994.
