= The Fighting Demon =

1925 film directed by Arthur Rosson

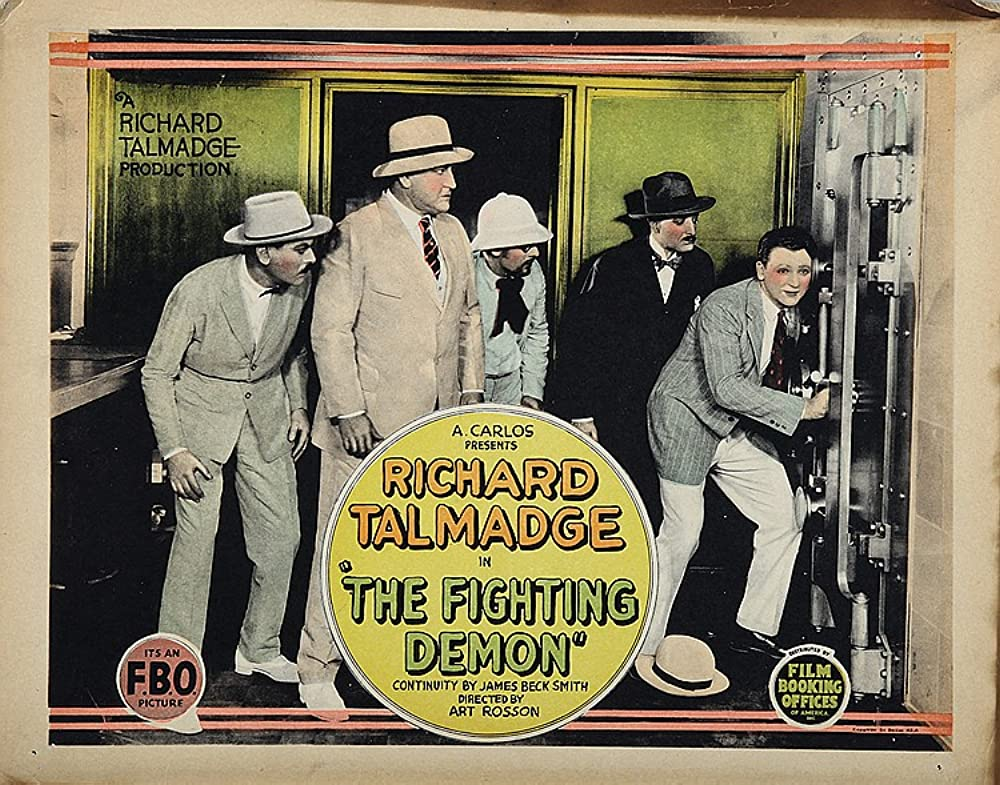
- Lobby card
- Directed by: Arthur Rosson
- Screenplay by: James Bell Smith (continuity)
- Story by: Charles Metz
- Produced by: A. Carlos
- Starring: Richard Talmadge; Lorraine Eason; Dick Sutherland
- Cinematography: William Marshall; Jack Stevens
- Edited by: Doane Harrison
- Production companies: Richard Talmadge Productions; Truart Film Corporation
- Distributed by: Film Booking Offices of America
- Release date: May 24, 1925 (US)
- Running time: 6 reels
- Country: United States
- Language: Silent (English intertitles)

The Fighting Demon is a 1925 American silent melodrama film. Directed by Arthur Rosson, the film stars Richard Talmadge, Lorraine Eason, and Dick Sutherland. It was released on May 24, 1925.

== Plot ==
As described in a film magazine review, John Drake, athlete and bank vault designer, travels to South America to accept a position. He meets Dynamite Díaz and his bride and helps the prize fighter train. The bride flirts, causing Díaz to become enraged and to administer a beating to Drake. Arriving in South America, Drake discovers that the position was a hoax used by a criminal gang to get Drake to reveal a method of entering a bank vault that he had designed. He refuses and the crooks steal all is valuables in an effort to obtain his aid. To get funds to live, he is persuaded to fight the champion. Dolores is told by the leader of the crooks that Drake is not to be trusted. At the fight, Drake is punished for two rounds when he remembers a punch used by the fighter Díaz had told him was always disastrous to him. Drake uses it and the fight is over. The leader of the gang tells Drake and Dolores that her father, the president of the bank, is locked in his own vault. Drake goes to open it, and is hit on the head by the crooks. The gang is captured when an apparatus Drake designed sounds an alarm. Drake and Dolores are happy and he becomes a teller at the bank.

== Cast list ==
- Richard Talmadge as John Drake
- Lorraine Eason as Dolores Darcy
- Dick Sutherland as Dynamite Díaz
- Peggy Shaw as Mrs. Dynamite Díaz
- Herbert Prior as Jackson Pierce
- Charles Hill Mailes as Señor Darcy
- Stanton Heck as Isaac Belding
- Jack Hill as Professor
- Dave Morris as Kid Price
- André Cheron as Slippery Logan

== Reception ==
The Calgary Albertan gave the film a positive review, "Fine comedy, fast moving melodrama, and a series of stunts and chases that even out-Talmadge Talmadge, make "The Fighting Demon" thoroughly delightful entertainment." Exhibitor's Trade Review gave the film an overall positive review, although they felt the plot was a bit thin, albeit with good bits of romance and melodrama. They applauded the action and stunts, as well as the performances by Talmadge and his supporting cast.
