= From Hand to Mouth =

1919 film

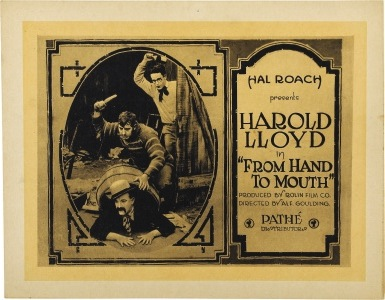
- Film poster
- Directed by: Alfred J. Goulding; Hal Roach
- Written by: Harold Lloyd (uncredited); H. M. Walker
- Produced by: Hal Roach
- Starring: Harold Lloyd; Mildred Davis
- Distributed by: Pathé Exchange
- Release date: December 28, 1919
- Running time: 22 minutes
- Country: United States
- Language: Silent with English intertitles

From Hand to Mouth (1919)

From Hand to Mouth is a 1919 American silent short comedy film featuring Harold Lloyd. This was the first film Lloyd made with frequent co-star (and future wife) Mildred Davis. A print of the film survives in the film archive of the British Film Institute.

== Plot ==
A young woman stands to inherit a fortune, but a crooked lawyer deliberately does not tell her she must prove her claim before midnight. If she fails, the inheritance will go to her foster brother. As further insurance, the lawyer hires a man and his gang to kidnap her.

Meanwhile, a penniless young man and an unrelated child (the waif) are both hungry. The waif's dog brings them some money (taken from a crap game), so they purchase some food. When the money turns out to be counterfeit, the man tries to flee, but is finally caught by a policeman. The heiress happens to be driving by. She generously pays for the food, and the young man is allowed to go his way.

Later, he gets into trouble with the police again, this time over a wallet filled with money lying on the sidewalk. To escape, he hitches a ride on a passing car, which is carrying the kidnappers. The crooks decide to use the man as a scapegoat in their crime. They capture the woman (who thinks the man is a kidnapper too) and take her to their lair. Unable to stop them, he follows them to their hideout and overhears the lawyer explaining the situation. The man then tries to alert several policemen, but they just brush him off. He finally provokes them into chasing him and leads them to the crooks. During the ensuing melee, he and the woman get away. He takes her to the lawyer's office just in time to sign a document and secure her inheritance.

== Cast ==
- Harold Lloyd as The Boy
- Mildred Davis as The Girl
- Peggy Cartwright as The Waif (as Peggy Courtwright)
- Snub Pollard as The Kidnapper (as Harry Pollard)
- Sammy Brooks (uncredited)
- William Gillespie (uncredited)
- Helen Gilmore as Hag (uncredited)
- Wallace Howe (uncredited)
- Dee Lampton as Driver (uncredited)
- Gus Leonard as Mr. Will Walling (uncredited)
- Gaylord Lloyd (uncredited)
- Marie Mosquini as Maid (uncredited)
- Fred C. Newmeyer (uncredited)
- Charles Stevenson as Stolen Wallet Cop (uncredited)
- Noah Young as Conspirator (uncredited)

== See also ==
- Harold Lloyd filmography
