= Grandma's Boy (1922 film) =

1922 film by Fred C. Newmeyer

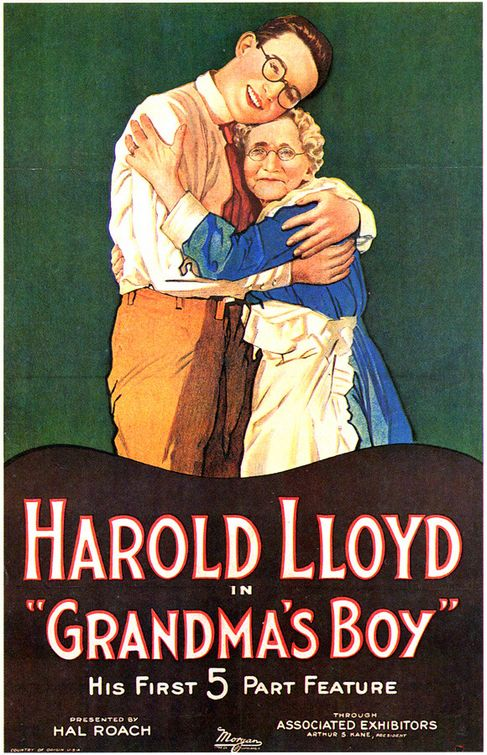
- Directed by: Fred C. Newmeyer
- Written by: Hal Roach; Sam Taylor; Jean Havez; H. M. Walker
- Produced by: Hal Roach (uncredited)
- Starring: Harold Lloyd
- Production company: Hal Roach Studios
- Distributed by: Pathé Film Exchange original release, Associated Exhibitors Encore Presentation
- Release date: September 3, 1922
- Running time: 60 minutes
- Country: United States
- Languages: Silent; English intertitles
- Budget: $94,412
- Box office: $1.1 million (US/Canada)

Grandma's Boy is a 1922 American silent comedy-drama film starring Harold Lloyd, Mildred Davis, and Anna Townsend. Lloyd stars as a fearful, timid young man who has to find confidence when a criminal comes into town and his girl is courted by someone else. The film was highly influential, helping to pioneer feature-length comedies which combined gags with character development. It was an immensely popular, commercially successful film in its time.

== Plot ==
Grandma's Boy (1922)

In the quiet small town of Blossom Bend: A 19-year-old young man, referred to in the film as "the boy" or "Grandma's boy", lives together with his beloved grandmother. Since earliest childhood he has been fearful and tries to avoid trouble whenever possible. He is in love with the pretty girl from the neighborhood, but a self-confident rival is also courting the girl. During an evening rendezvous the girl's affection for the boy becomes apparent, yet he is repeatedly put in his place by his romantic rival.

That same evening the criminal tramp "The Rolling Stone" raids the local jewelry store and shoots a person in the process. The shocked citizens of Blossom Bend launch a search for the criminal, in the course of which they also burst into the house of the girl’s parents. When only one post as deputy sheriff remains to be filled, the boy’s romantic rival is supposed to be appointed to it. The rival, however, knows the boy's timidity and calculates that he would fail immediately on a manhunt and thereby deeply disappoint the girl. Calculatingly, the rival therefore leaves the deputy sheriff's badge to the boy.

In fact the boy quickly feels overwhelmed by the manhunt and seeks refuge with his grandmother. She tells the boy the story of his grandfather, who fought on the side of the Confederacy during the Civil war and had a dangerous assignment: Although the grandfather was also fearful, he managed to carry out the mission with the help of a magical staff that had been given to him by a mysterious old woman. The grandmother produces the supposedly magical staff, which is now meant to help Harold.

The next morning the boy, equipped with the magical staff, rejoins the manhunt. Now he proves himself braver and, above all, cleverer than the other men of the town. After a long struggle and with a number of tricks he is able to overcome the physically superior "Rolling Stone" and hand him over to the sheriff. He then also defeats his romantic rival in a fight for the girl.

The boy is now finally courageous and is respected in the village when his grandmother reveals to him that the whole story about the magical staff was completely made up. It was in truth merely the handle of her umbrella. Belief in the power of the staff, but above all he himself, brought about his deeds. In the end the girl accepts the boy's proposal of marriage.

== Cast ==
- Harold Lloyd as Grandma's Boy/Grandfather
- Mildred Davis as His Girl
- Anna Townsend as Grandma
- Charles Stevenson as His Love Rival/The Union General
- Dick Sutherland as The Rolling Stone
- Noah Young as The Sheriff
- May Wallace as The Girl's Mother (uncredited)
- Wallace Howe as The Girl's Father (uncredited)
- Mark Jones as the mysterious old women in Civil War sequence (uncredited)

== Background ==
While Harold Lloyd went uncredited for his contributions to the screenplay, the basic storyline was actually developed by himself. The film was first intended to be more serious than comedic, but after a disappointing preview, Lloyd and his producer Hal Roach decided to shoot additional comedic scenes while maintaining the more serious basic theme of a boy's coming-of-age story. Harold Lloyd later told film historian Kevin Brownlow that "it could have been a drama just as easily as a comedy".

== Reception ==
Grandma's Boy was both a critical and commercial success at it's release in 1922, noted for it's then novel mixture of naturalistic humor and dramatic situations in a film comedy. Along with Charlie Chaplin's The Kid the year before, Grandma's Boy is considered one of the first Hollywood slapstick comedies which effectively used the switch from short to feature length films for a better character and plot development.

Charlie Chaplin was in awe about the film when he first saw it: "One of the best constructed screenplays I have ever seen. The boy has a fine understanding of light and shape and that picture has given me a real artistic thrill and stimulated me to go ahead." Al Jolson called it "the greatest comedy picture I ever saw" and “a new conception of screened comedy" in an August 1922 interview with Exhibitors Herald. In his later years, Lloyd stated that "if I had to choose my favorite of all my films, I would choose Grandma's Boy".

The German Lexikon des internationalen Films wrote decades later that the film's effect on the viewer is not as strong as some later and more spectecular work's of Lloyd, but "Lloyd's first masterpiece in feature film length is likeable due to an appealing simplicity". Benjamin Wright noted in 2014: "With Grandma’s Boy, Lloyd's Glasses character would acquire depth and would no longer be just a vehicle for driving laughs."

== See also ==
- Harold Lloyd filmography
