= Safety Last! =

1923 American silent romantic comedy film

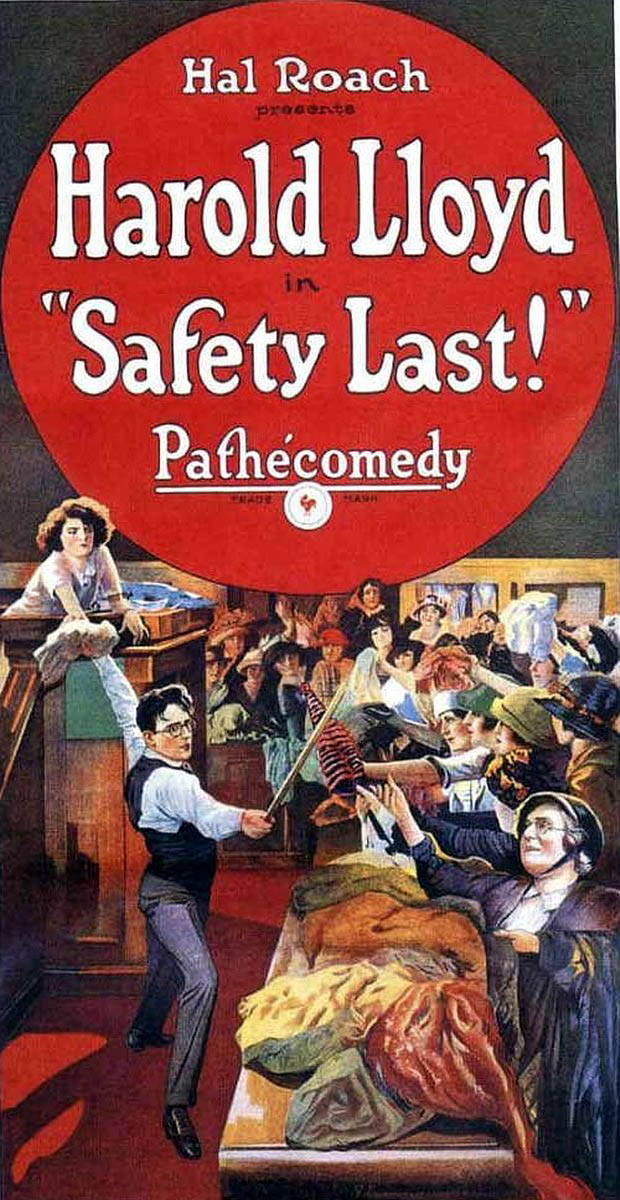
- Theatrical release poster
- Directed by: Fred C. Newmeyer; Sam Taylor
- Written by: H. M. Walker (titles); Jean Havez (uncredited); Harold Lloyd (uncredited)
- Story by: Hal Roach; Sam Taylor; Tim Whelan
- Produced by: Hal Roach
- Starring: Harold Lloyd
- Cinematography: Walter Lundin
- Edited by: T. J. Crizer
- Production company: Hal Roach Studios
- Distributed by: Pathé Exchange
- Release date: April 1, 1923 (US)
- Running time: 73 minutes
- Country: United States
- Language: Silent film (English intertitles)
- Budget: $121,000
- Box office: $1.5 million

Safety Last! is a 1923 American silent romantic comedy film starring Harold Lloyd. It includes one of the most famous images from the silent-film era: Lloyd clutching the hands of a large clock as he dangles from the outside of a skyscraper above moving traffic. The film was highly successful and critically hailed, and it cemented Lloyd's status as a major figure in early motion pictures. It is still popular at revivals, and it is viewed today as one of the great film comedies.

The film's title is a play on the common expression "safety first", which describes the adoption of safety measures as a means to avoid accidents, especially in workplaces. Lloyd performed some of the climbing stunts himself, despite having lost a thumb and forefinger four years earlier in a film accident.

In 1994, Safety Last! was selected for preservation in the United States National Film Registry by the Library of Congress as being "culturally, historically, or aesthetically significant". It is one of many works from 1923 that notably entered the public domain in the United States in 2019, the first time any works had done so in 20 years.

== Plot ==
Safety Last! (1923)

In 1922, Harold Lloyd is behind bars. His mother and his girlfriend, Mildred, are consoling him as a somber official and priest show up. The three of them walk toward what looks like a noose. It then becomes obvious they are at a train station and the "noose" is actually a trackside pickup hoop used by train crews to receive orders without stopping, and the bars are merely the ticket barrier. He promises to send for his girlfriend so they can get married once he has "made good" in the big city. Then he is off.

He gets a job as a salesclerk at the De Vore Department Store, where he has to pull various stunts to get out of trouble with the picky and arrogantly self-important head floorwalker, Mr. Stubbs. He shares a rented room with his pal "Limpy" Bill, a construction worker.

When Harold finishes his shift, he sees an old friend from his hometown who is now a policeman walking the beat. After he leaves, Bill shows up. Bragging to Bill about his supposed influence with the police department, he persuades Bill to knock the policeman backwards over him while the man is using a callbox, thinking that the cop is just his same buddy, and thus he will just take it in good humor. When Bill does so, he knocks over the wrong policeman. To escape, he climbs up the façade of a building. The policeman tries to follow, but cannot get past the first floor; in frustration he shouts at Bill, "You'll do time for this! The first time I lay eyes on you again, I'll pinch you!"

Meanwhile, Harold has been hiding his lack of success by sending his girlfriend expensive presents he cannot really afford. She mistakenly thinks he is successful enough to support a family and, with his mother's encouragement, takes a train to join him. In his embarrassment, he has to pretend to be the general manager, even succeeding in impersonating him to get back at Stubbs. While going to retrieve her purse (which Mildred left in the manager's office), he overhears the real general manager say he would give $1,000 to anyone who could attract people to the store. He remembers Bill's talent and pitches the idea of having a man climb the "12-storey Bolton building", which De Vore's occupies. He gets Bill to agree to do it by offering him $500. The stunt is highly publicized and a large crowd gathers the next day.

When a drunkard shows "The Law" (the policeman who was pushed over) a newspaper story about the event, the lawman suspects Bill is going to be the climber. He waits at the starting point despite Harold's frantic efforts to get him to leave. Finally, unable to wait any longer, Bill suggests Harold climb the first story himself and then switch his hat and coat with Bill, who will continue on from there. After Harold starts up, the policeman spots Bill and chases him into the building. Every time Harold tries to switch places with Bill, the policeman appears and chases Bill away. Each time, Bill tells his friend he will meet him on the next floor up.

Eventually, Harold reaches the top, despite his troubles with some hungry pigeons, a net, several cheering girls, an old lady, a construction duo, a clock, a rope, a dog, a mouse, a gun man, and a wind gauge, he finally kisses his girl. While they walk away, Harold accidentally steps in a tar pit and loses his oxford shoes and socks.

== Cast ==
- Harold Lloyd as Harold Lloyd, "The Boy"
- Mildred Davis as The Girl
- Bill Strother as Bill "Limpy Bill", The Pal
- Noah Young as The Law
- Westcott Clarke as Mr. Stubbs, The Floorwalker
- Earl Mohan as The Drunk
- Mickey Daniels as The Newsboy
- Anna Townsend as The Grandma

== Production ==
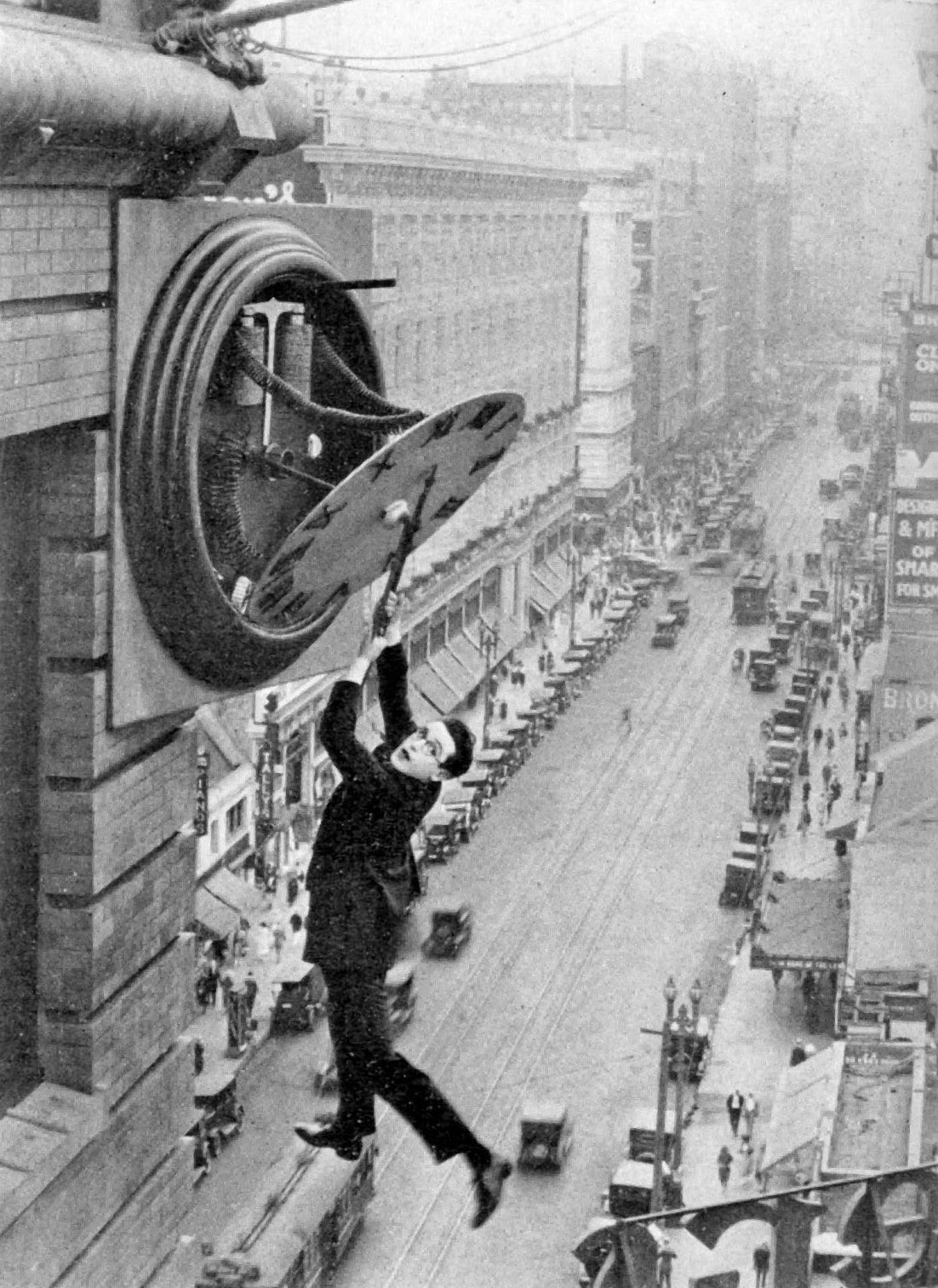
The iconic shot of Lloyd hanging from the clock

Lloyd hanging from a giant clock on the corner of a building was seen as an iconic image for him, though it was achieved through a certain degree of improvisation. Lloyd performed most of his own stuntwork, but a circus performer was used when The Boy hangs by a rope, and a stunt double – sometimes Bill Strother, who played "Limpy" Bill and was a steeplejack who inspired the sequence when Lloyd saw him climbing – was used in long shots. The giant clock scene was filmed on the roof of Broadway Leasehold Building, as was the final shot of the film.

A number of buildings from 1st Street to 9th Street in downtown Los Angeles, all of different heights, were used, with sets built on their roofs to match the facade of the main building, the International Bank Building at Temple and Spring Streets. In this way, the illusion of Lloyd climbing higher and higher up the side of one building was created (although the streetscapes seen beyond the sets are noticeably different at different stages of the climb).

Stuntman Harvey Parry also appeared in the climactic sequence, a fact he revealed only after Lloyd's death. In the 1980 Thames Television series Hollywood, he discussed at length how the stunts were achieved.

Safety Last! was one of many silent films to film in a one-block alley near Hollywood and Cahuenga Boulevard. The alley was later renamed Chaplin-Keaton-Lloyd Alley in recognition of this and other films.

== Reception ==
The New York Times gave Safety Last! a very positive review. A contemporary review in Photoplay predicted the film's future: "This new Harold Lloyd farce will become a classic of its kind, or we will miss our guess. For it is the bespectacled comedian's best effort to date." The reviewer concluded, "This is easily one of the big comedies of the year. It is seven-reels in length—but it speeds by with the rapidity of a corking two-reeler."

The Library of Congress added Safety Last! to its National Film Registry in 1994. The American Film Institute nominated the film for both their 1998 and 2007 lists of AFI's 100 Years...100 Movies. It was also nominated for AFI's 100 Years...100 Laughs. It placed #97 on AFI's 100 Years...100 Thrills.

Rotten Tomatoes gives the film a rating of 97% from 70 reviews, with the consensus: "Persuasive enough to give audiences acrophobia when they aren't laughing at Harold Lloyd's antics, Safety Last! is a marvel of visual effects and slapstick comedy."

== Home video ==
The film was released in multiple versions on home video, both on VHS and DVD. It was released via the Criterion Collection on DVD and Blu-ray on June 18, 2013.

== See also ==
- Harold Lloyd filmography

== Works cited ==
- Ed Park Safety Last!: High-Flying Harold, an essay at the Criterion Collection
- Daniel Eagan. Safety Last, in America's Film Legacy: The Authoritative Guide to the Landmark Movies in the National Film Registry, A&C Black, 2010 ISBN 0826429777, pages 86–88
- Bann, Richard W. "Safety Last: film essay" (PDF). National Film Preservation Board. Library of Congress. Archived from the original (PDF) on March 24, 2019.
- Roger Ebert review rogerebert.com
- Safety Last! review filmsite.org
