= Mildred Davis =

American actress (1901–1969)

Mildred Davis Lloyd
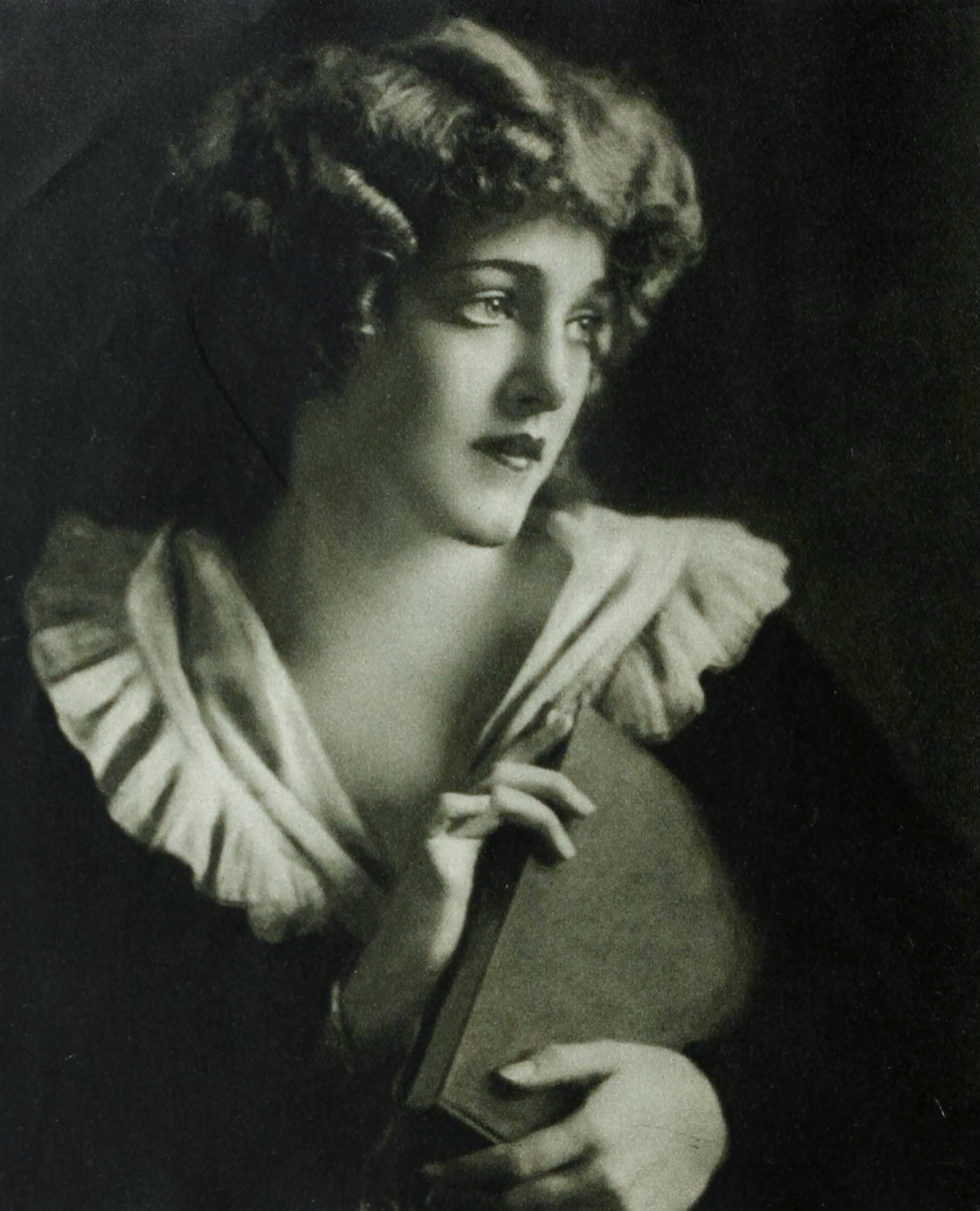
- Mildred Davis in 1924
- Born: Mildred Hillary Davis; February 22, 1901; Philadelphia, Pennsylvania, U.S.
- Died: August 18, 1969 (aged 68); Santa Monica, California, U.S.
- Education: Friends School
- Occupation: Actress
- Years active: 1916–1927
- Spouse: Harold Lloyd (m. 1923)
- Children: 3, including Harold Lloyd Jr.
- Relatives: Jack Davis (brother)

Mildred Hillary Davis (February 22, 1901 – August 18, 1969) was an American actress who appeared in fifteen of Harold Lloyd's classic silent comedies and eventually married him.

== Early life and career ==
Midlred Davis was daughter of Howard Beckett Davis, she was born in Philadelphia, Pennsylvania, and educated at the Friends School in Philadelphia. Her younger brother, thirteen years her junior, was child actor Jack Davis, who appeared in Hal Roach's Our Gang series in the 1920s.

After spending several years studying, she traveled to Los Angeles in the hopes of securing a role in a film. After appearing in several small roles, she caught the attention of Hal Roach, who pointed her out to comedian Lloyd. Lloyd was looking for a leading lady to replace Bebe Daniels, and cast Davis in his comedy short From Hand to Mouth in 1919. It would be the first of fifteen films they would star in together.

Davis retired from acting in 1923. After much persuasion by Davis (and much grief) she received Lloyd's consent for her return to the screen in Too Many Crooks, which Lloyd produced through his production company.

== Personal life ==
On February 10, 1923, Davis married film star Harold Lloyd and shortly thereafter retired from acting in films. Lloyd began construction on a home on his 14-acre Beverly Hills estate that year. The couple moved to a mansion in Benedict Canyon, Los Angeles, in 1929.

Davis and Lloyd had two children together: Gloria Lloyd (1924–2012) and Harold Clayton Lloyd Jr. (1931–1971). They also adopted Gloria Freeman (1924–1986) in September 1930, whom they renamed Marjorie Elizabeth Lloyd but was known as Peggy for most of her life.

Davis and Lloyd remained married for 46 years, until Davis' death.

== Death ==
On August 18, 1969, following a period of poor health, Davis suffered a heart attack and died in St. John's Hospital in Santa Monica, California.

== Filmography ==
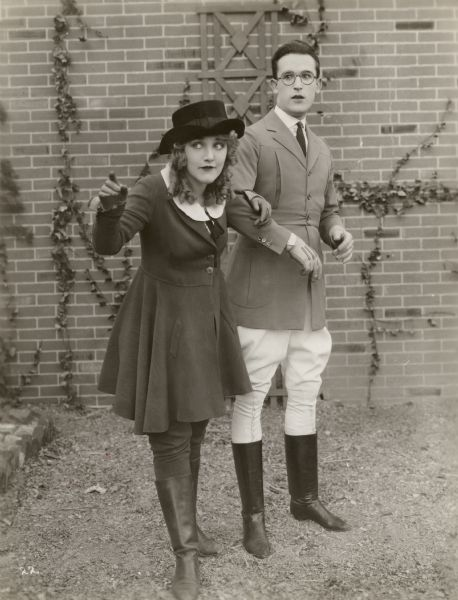
Film still of Davis and her future husband Harold Lloyd in the silent comedy Among Those Present (1921)

Year	Title	Role
1916	Marriage à la Carte	
1917	What'll We Do with Uncle?	
1917	Fighting Mad	Lily Sawyer
1918	Bud's Recruit	Edith's sister
1918	A Weaver of Dreams	Margery Gordon
1919	All Wrong	Betty Thompson
1919	Start Something	
1919	All at Sea	
1919	Call for Mr. Caveman	
1919	Giving the Bride Away	
1919	Looking for Trouble	
1919	Tough Luck	
1919	From Hand to Mouth	The Girl
1920	Red Hot Hottentotts	
1920	Why Go Home?	
1920	The Floor Below	
1920	His Royal Slyness	Princess Florelle
1920	Getting His Goat	
1920	Haunted Spooks	The Girl
1920	An Eastern Westerner	The Girl
1920	High and Dizzy	The Girl
1920	Get Out and Get Under	The Girl
1920	Number, Please?	The Girl
1921	Humor Risk	
1921	Now or Never	The Girl
1921	Among Those Present	Miss O'Brien, The Girl
1921	I Do	Wife
1921	Never Weaken	The Girl
1921	A Sailor-Made Man	The Girl
1922	Grandma's Boy	His Girl
1922	Dr. Jack	The Sick-Little-Well-Girl
1923	Safety Last!	The Girl
1923	Temporary Marriage	Hazel Manners
1923	Condemned	The Girl
1927	Too Many Crooks	Ceia Mason
