= Jean Havez =

American writer

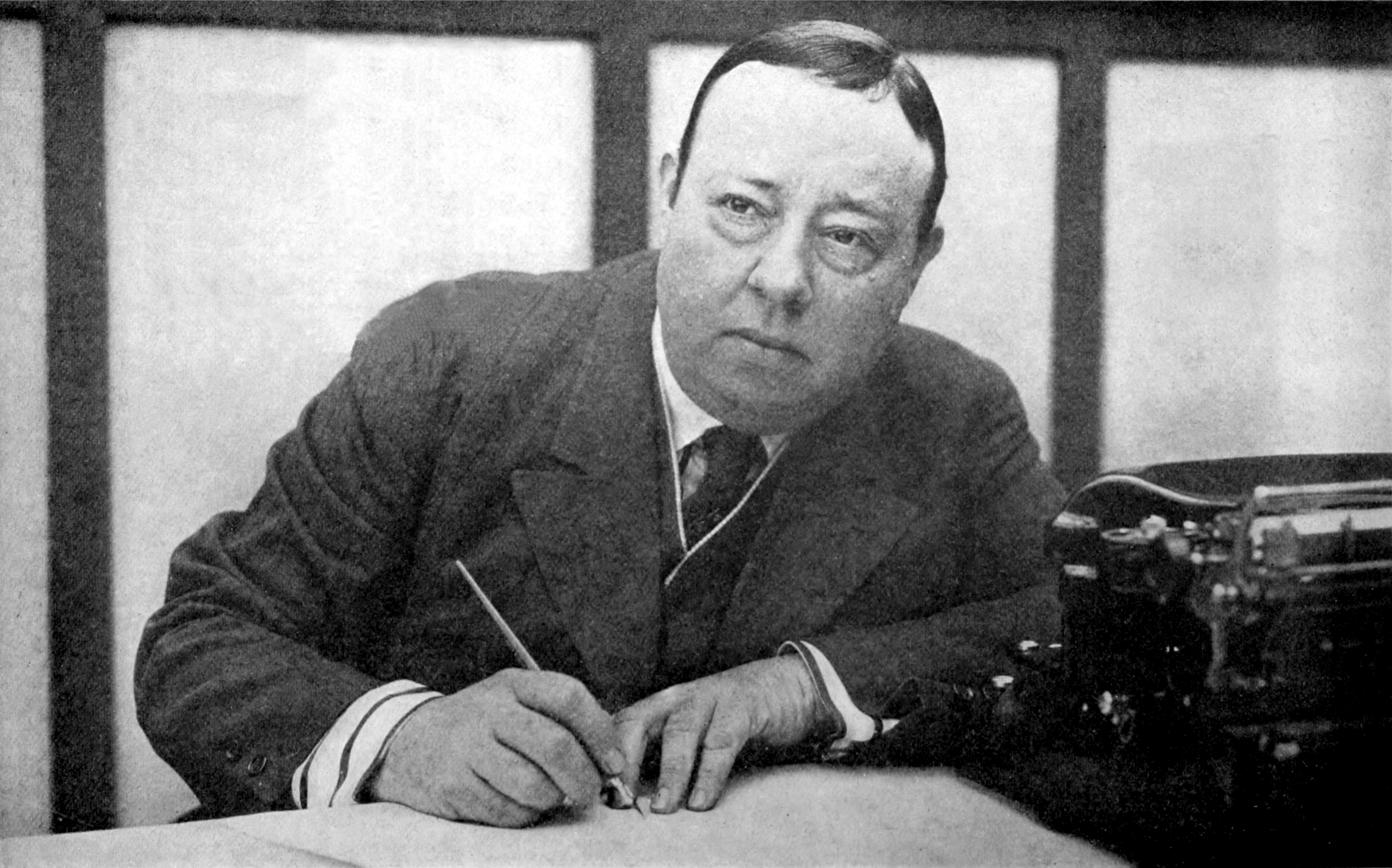
- Jean Havez in 1921
- Born: Jean Constant Havez; December 24, 1872; Baltimore, Maryland, US
- Died: February 11, 1925 (aged 52); Beverly Hills, California, US
- Burial place: Hollywood Forever Cemetery
- Occupation(s): Songwriter, skit writer, silent film screenwriter
- Spouses: Cecil Cunningham (m. 1915–1917) Doris Vernon (Ebba Ahl) (m. 1918–1925)

Jean Constant Havez (December 24, 1872 – February 11, 1925) was an American lyricist, screenwriter, and vaudevillian. During his film career, Havez worked with comedians Buster Keaton and Harold Lloyd.

== Career ==
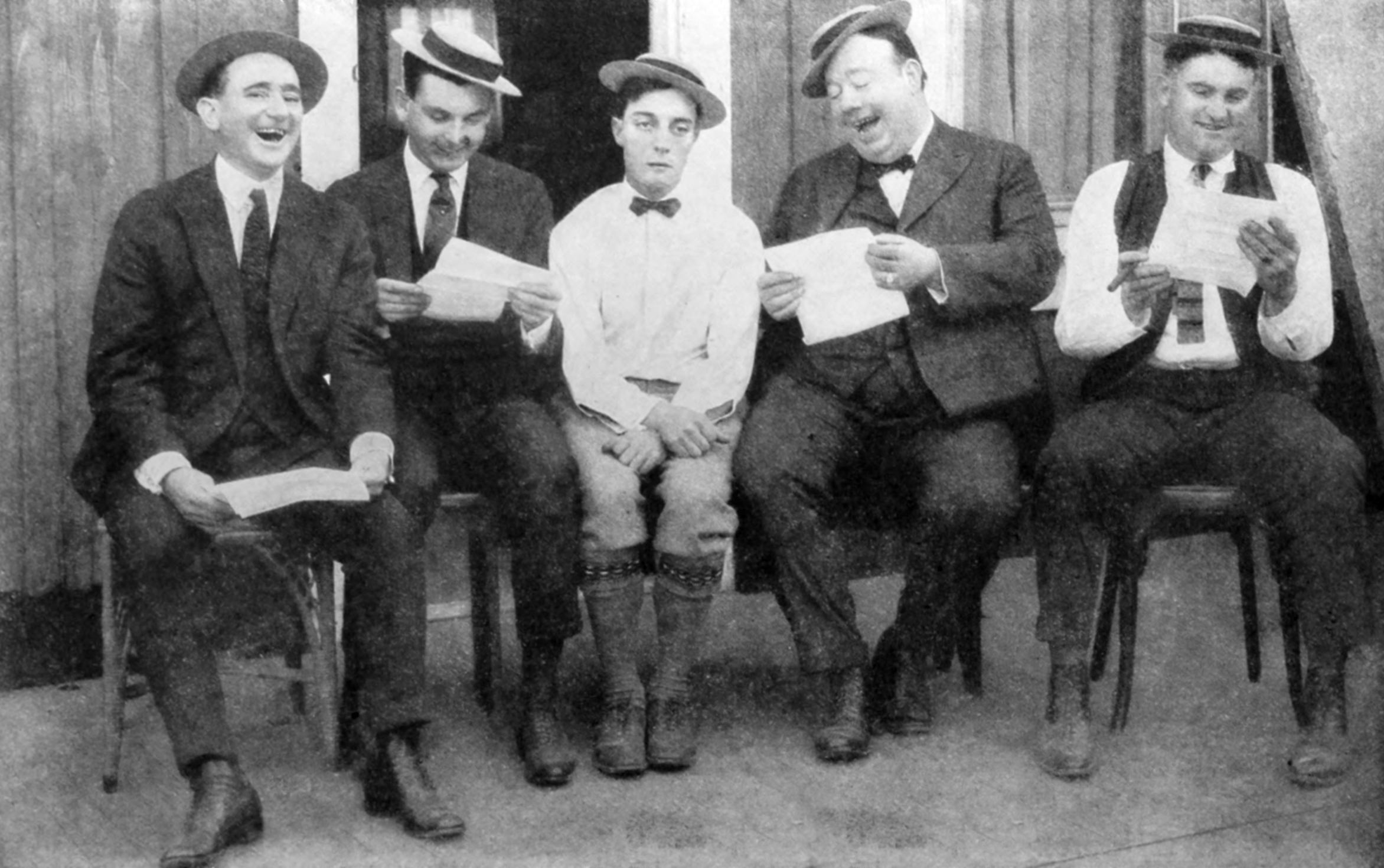
Joseph A. Mitchell, Clyde Bruckman, Buster Keaton, Havez and Edward F. Cline in 1923.

Havez was a charter member of ASCAP (1914). His novelty songs, popular in their day, include "Darktown Poker Club" and "I'm Cured", written for the great vaudevillian Bert Williams for the 1914 Ziegfeld Follies; "Everybody Works But Father", "When You Ain't Got No Money then You Needn't Come Around", "I'm Looking For an Angel", "Do Not Forget the Good Old Days", "You're On the Right Road, Sister", "He Cert'ny Was Good to Me" and the lyrics for "Sailing Down the Chesapeake Bay". Concurrent with his songwriting, Havez wrote vaudeville routines and stage shows for such performers as Reine Davies, Trixie Friganza, Kolb & Dill, and Cecil Cunningham (who was his first wife).

Havez penned Keystone scenarios for Roscoe Arbuckle, among others, and co-wrote several of Keaton's most popular films, including Our Hospitality (1923), Sherlock Jr. (1924), The Navigator (1924), and Seven Chances (1925). Havez supplied the story, and theme song, for Lloyd's first comedy feature Grandma's Boy (1921), and also contributed (uncredited) to Lloyd's most famous film Safety Last! (1923). Havez died at home of a heart attack and was interred in the Hollywood Forever Cemetery in Hollywood, CA. His widow, a vaudevillian turned screenwriter, married director Edward Sedgwick and remained with him until his death in 1953.

== Songs ==
- "Darktown Poker Club"
- "I'm Cured"
- "The Alabama Barbecue", words

== Filmography ==
- Our Hospitality (1923)
- Sherlock Jr. (1924)
- The Navigator (1924)
- Seven Chances (1925)
- Grandma's Boy (1921)
- Safety Last! (1923)

== In popular culture ==
One of the two detective characters in The X-Files episode "Clyde Bruckman's Final Repose", is named after him. Just like how the title of the episode itself is named after Clyde Bruckman.
