= Sam Taylor (director) =

American film director (1895–1958)

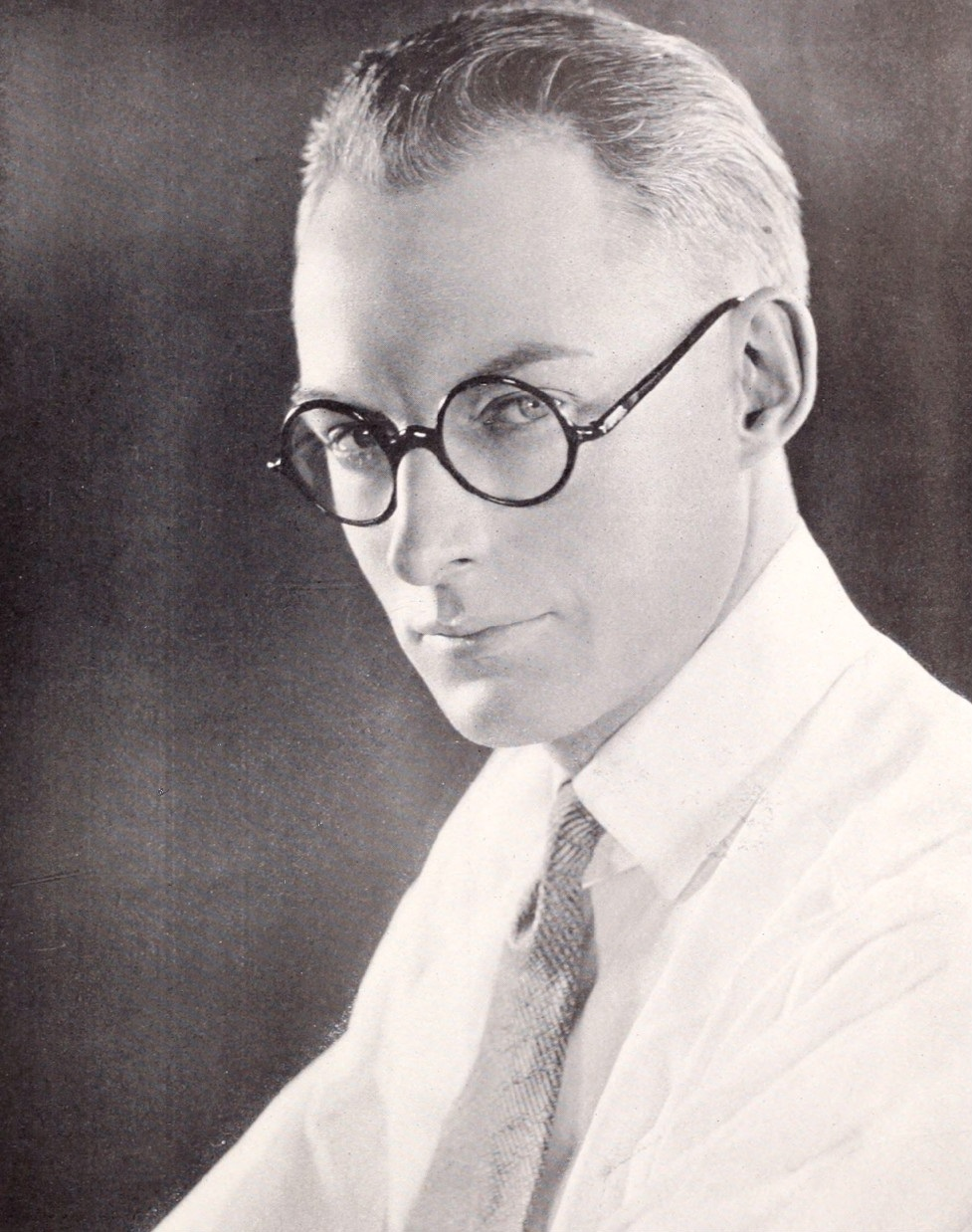
- Taylor in 1925
- Born: Sam Taylor; August 13, 1895; New York City, U.S.
- Died: March 6, 1958 (aged 62); Santa Monica, California, U.S.
- Occupations: Film director; screenwriter; producer
- Years active: 1916–1949

Sam Taylor (August 13, 1895 – March 6, 1958) was an American film director, screenwriter, and producer, most active in the silent film era. Taylor is best known for his comedic directorial work with Harold Lloyd and Mary Pickford, and also later worked with Laurel and Hardy. He was born in New York City.

A notorious cinematic legend over the decades has suggested that Taylor's 1929 adaptation of Shakespeare's The Taming of the Shrew had the screen credit "additional dialogue by Sam Taylor". However, no extant prints of the film contain this credit, and there is no documentary evidence that it ever existed.

Taylor directed eight feature films with Lloyd as star, with a number of them being co-directed with Fred C. Newmeyer. Taylor also directed Pickford in her first "talkie" feature with Coquette (1929), which garnered the latter an Academy Award.

Taylor died at the age of 62 in Santa Monica, California.

== Partial filmography ==
Those marked with an asterisk indicate Harold Lloyd films.

- Over the Garden Wall (1919)
- In Honor's Web (1919)
- Human Collateral (1920)
- Now or Never* (1921)
- Never Weaken* (1921)
- Princess Jones (1921)
- The Mohican's Daughter (1922)
- Dr. Jack* (1922)
- Safety Last!* (1923)
- Why Worry?* (1923)
- Girl Shy* (1924)
- Hot Water* (1924)
- The Freshman* (1925)
- For Heaven's Sake* (1926)
- Exit Smiling (1927)
- My Best Girl (1927)
- Tempest (1928)
- The Woman Disputed (1928)
- Lady of the Pavements (1929) (screenplay)
- The Taming of the Shrew (1929)
- Coquette (1929)
- Du Barry, Woman of Passion (1930)
- Skyline (1931)
- Ambassador Bill (1931)
- Kiki (1931)
- Devil's Lottery (1932)
- Out All Night (1933)
- The Cat's-Paw* (1934)
- Vagabond Lady (1935)
- Nothing but Trouble (1944)
