= 1922 in film =

This is an overview of 1922 in film, including significant events, a list of films released and notable births and deaths.

== Top-grossing films (U.S.) ==
The top ten films released in 1922 by U.S. gross are as follows:

Highest-grossing films of 1922
Rank	Title	Distributor	Domestic rentals
1	Robin Hood	United Artists	$2,101,044
2	Blood and Sand	Paramount	$1,250,000
3	Manslaughter	Paramount	$1,206,014
4	Grandma's Boy	Pathé Exchange	$1,100,000
5	Smilin' Through	First National	$1,000,000
6	Saturday Night	Paramount	$753,807
7	Rags to Riches	Warner Bros.	$418,000
8	Heroes of the Street	Warner Bros.	$366,000
9	The Beautiful and Damned	Warner Bros.	$327,000
10	Your Best Friend	Warner Bros.	$132,000

== Events ==
- June 11 – United States première of Robert J. Flaherty's Nanook of the North, the first commercially successful feature length documentary film.
- November 26 – The Toll of the Sea, starring Anna May Wong and Kenneth Harlan, debuts as the first general release film to use two-tone Technicolor (The Gulf Between was the first film to do so but it was not widely distributed).

== Notable films released in 1922 ==
United States unless stated

=== A ===
- At the Sign of the Jack O'Lantern (lost), directed by Lloyd Ingraham, based on the 1905 novel by Myrtle Reed

=== B ===
- The Bachelor Daddy (lost), directed by Alfred E. Green, starring Thomas Meighan
- The Beautiful and Damned (lost), directed by William A. Seiter, starring Marie Prevost
- Beauty's Worth, directed by Robert G. Vignola, starring Marion Davies
- Beyond the Rocks, directed by Sam Wood, starring Gloria Swanson and Rudolph Valentino
- A Bill of Divorcement, directed by Denison Clift, starring Constance Binney and Fay Compton – (GB)
- The Blacksmith, directed by Mal St. Clair and Buster Keaton, starring Buster Keaton
- A Blind Bargain (lost), directed by Wallace Worsley, starring Lon Chaney, based on the 1897 novel The Octave of Claudius by Barry Pain
- Blood and Sand, directed by Fred Niblo, starring Rudolph Valentino, Lila Lee and Nita Naldi
- The Bohemian Girl, directed by Harley Knoles, Starring Ivor Novello and Gladys Cooper – (GB)
- The Bride's Play, directed by George Terwilliger, starring Marion Davies
- The Burning Soil (Der brennende Acker), directed by F. W. Murnau – (Germany)

=== C ===
- The Card, directed by A. V. Bramble – (GB)
- Clarence (lost), directed by William C. deMille, starring Wallace Reid, Agnes Ayres and May McAvoy
- Cocaine, directed by Graham Cutts – (GB)
- Cops, directed by Edward F. Cline and Buster Keaton, starring Buster Keaton
- Crainquebille (Coster Bill of Paris), directed by Jacques Feyder – (France)

=== D ===
- A Dangerous Adventure, 15-part serial directed by Sam Warner and Jack L. Warner, starring Grace Darmond
- Danse Macabre, directed by Dudley Murphy
- Day Dreams, directed by Edward F. Cline and Buster Keaton, Starring Buster Keaton and Renée Adorée
- A Debt of Honour, directed by Maurice Elvey, starring Isobel Elsom and Clive Brook – (GB)
- The Dictator (lost), directed by James Cruze, starring Wallace Reid and Lila Lee
- Dr. Mabuse, der Spieler (Dr. Mabuse the Gambler), directed by Fritz Lang, starring Rudolf Klein-Rogge, based on the 1921 novel by Norbert Jacques – (Germany)
- Dr. Jack, directed by Fred C. Newmeyer, starring Harold Lloyd
- Don Juan et Faust, directed by Marcel L'Herbier, based on an 1828 play by Christian Dietrich Grabbe – (France)
- The Dungeon (lost), written and directed by Oscar Micheaux

=== E ===
- Estrellita del Cine, directed by José Nepomuceno – (Philippines)
- The Electric House, directed by Edward F. Cline and Buster Keaton, starring Buster Keaton
- Esmeralda (lost), directed by Edwin J. Collins, starring Sybil Thorndike, based on the 1831 novel The Hunchback of Notre-Dame by Victor Hugo – (GB)

=== F ===
- Fair Lady, directed by Kenneth Webb
- Faust, directed by Challis Sanderson, based on the 1808 play by Johann Wolfgang von Goethe – (GB)
- Faust, directed by Gérard Bourgeois, based on the 1808 play by Johann Wolfgang von Goethe – (France)
- La Femme de nulle part (The Woman from Nowhere), directed by Louis Delluc – (France)
- Flames of Passion, directed by Graham Cutts, starring Mae Marsh and C. Aubrey Smith – (GB)
- Flesh and Blood, directed by Irving Cummings, starring Lon Chaney and Noah Beery Sr.
- Foolish Wives, starring and directed by Erich von Stroheim
- The Frozen North, directed by Edward F. Cline and Buster Keaton, starring Buster Keaton

=== G ===
- The Ghost Breaker (lost), directed by Alfred E. Green, starring Wallace Reid and Lila Lee, based on the 1909 play by Paul Dickey and Charles W. Goddard
- A Gipsy Cavalier, directed by J. Stuart Blackton, starring Georges Carpentier and Flora le Breton – (GB)
- Grandma's Boy, directed by Fred C. Newmeyer, starring Harold Lloyd
- The Grass Orphan, directed by Frank Hall Crane – (GB)

=== H ===
- The Haunted House, directed by Erle C. Kenton
- Häxan: Witchcraft Through the Ages, starring and directed by Benjamin Christensen – (Sweden/Denmark)
- The Headless Horseman, directed by Edward D. Venturini, starring Will Rogers, based on the 1820 short story The Legend of Sleepy Hollow by Washington Irving
- Heroes of the Street, directed by William Beaudine, starring Wesley Barry and Marie Prevost

=== I ===
- In the Name of the Law (lost), directed by Emory Johnson, starring Ralph Lewis and Claire McDowell

=== L ===
- Laborer's Love (láogōng zhī àiqíng), directed by Zhang Shichuan – (China)
- Lonesome Corners, directed by Edgar Jones, starring Edgar Jones and Edna May Sperl.
- Lorna Doone, directed by Maurice Tourneur, starring Madge Bellamy
- The Loves of Pharaoh (Das Weib des Pharao), directed by Ernst Lubitsch, starring Emil Jannings – (Germany)
- Lucrezia Borgia, directed by Richard Oswald, starring Conrad Veidt and Liane Haid – (Germany)

=== M ===
- The Man from Beyond, directed by Burton L. King, starring Harry Houdini
- Manslaughter, directed by Cecil B. DeMille, starring Thomas Meighan and Lois Wilson
- Marizza (lost), directed by F. W. Murnau – (Germany)
- The Marriage Chance, written and directed by Hampton Del Ruth
- Money To Burn (lost), directed by Rowland V. Lee
- Moran of the Lady Letty, directed by George Melford, starring Dorothy Dalton and Rudolph Valentino
- More to Be Pitied Than Scorned (lost), directed by Edward LeSaint
- Mud and Sand, directed by Gilbert Pratt, starring Stan Laurel
- My Boy, directed by Victor Heerman and Albert Austin, starring Jackie Coogan
- My Wife's Relations, directed by Edward F. Cline and Buster Keaton, starring Buster Keaton

=== N ===
- Nanook of the North, a documentary directed by Robert J. Flaherty
- Nathan the Wise (Nathan der Weise), directed by Manfred Noa – (Germany)
- Nice People (lost), directed by William C. deMille, starring Wallace Reid, Bebe Daniels and Conrad Nagel
- Nosferatu – Eine Symphonie des Grauens (Nosferatu: A Symphony of Horror), directed by F. W. Murnau, starring Max Schreck, based on the 1897 novel Dracula by Bram Stoker without authorization – (Germany)
- Number 13 (lost), directed by Alfred Hitchcock – (GB)

=== O ===
- Oliver Twist, directed by Frank Lloyd, starring Jackie Coogan and Lon Chaney
- One Exciting Night, written and directed by D. W. Griffith
- One Glorious Day (lost), directed by James Cruze, starring Will Rogers and Lila Lee

=== P ===
- The Paleface, directed by Edward F. Cline and Buster Keaton, starring Buster Keaton
- Pay Day, a Charles Chaplin short
- Peg o' My Heart, directed by King Vidor, starring Laurette Taylor
- Phantom, directed by F. W. Murnau, starring Alfred Abel, Lil Dagover and Lya De Putti – (Germany)
- Polikushka (Поликушка), directed by Alexander Sanin – (U.S.S.R.)
- The Primitive Lover, directed by Sidney Franklin, starring Constance Talmadge and Harrison Ford
- The Prisoner of Zenda, directed by Rex Ingram, starring Lewis Stone and Alice Terry

=== R ===
- Rags to Riches, directed by Wallace Worsley, starring Wesley Barry
- Rent Free (lost), directed by Howard Higgin, starring Wallace Reid and Lila Lee
- Robin Hood, directed by Allan Dwan, starring Douglas Fairbanks and Wallace Beery
- Rob Roy, directed by W. P. Kellino – (GB)

=== S ===
- Saturday Night, directed by Cecil B. DeMille, starring Leatrice Joy and Conrad Nagel
- The Scarlet Letter, directed by Challis Sanderson, starring Sybil Thorndike – (GB)
- Shadows, directed by Tom Forman, starring Lon Chaney, Marguerite De La Motte and Harrison Ford
- Sherlock Holmes, directed by Albert Parker, starring John Barrymore, based on the 1899 stage play by William Gillette and Arthur Conan Doyle – (GB)
- Smilin' Through, directed by Sidney Franklin, starring Norma Talmadge
- Sodom and Gomorrah, directed by Michael Curtiz, starring Lucy Doraine – (Austria)
- La Souriante Madame Beudet (The Smiling Madame Beudet), directed by Germaine Dulac – (France)
- Squibs Wins the Calcutta Sweep, directed by George Pearson, starring Betty Balfour – (GB)
- The Suram Fortress (Suramis tsikhe), directed by Ivan Perestiani – (U.S.S.R.)

=== T ===
- Tess of the Storm Country, directed by John S. Robertson, starring Mary Pickford
- The Three Must-Get-Theres, a Max Linder film
- The Toll of the Sea, directed by Chester M. Franklin, starring Anna May Wong

=== W ===
- What's Wrong with the Women? (lost), directed by Roy William Neill, starring Constance Bennett
- When Knighthood Was in Flower, directed by Robert G. Vignola, starring Marion Davies
- Wildness of Youth, directed by Ivan Abramson

=== Y ===
- The Young Diana (lost), directed by Albert Capellani and Robert G. Vignola, starring Marion Davies
- The Young Rajah. directed by Phil Rosen, starring Rudolph Valentino
- Your Best Friend, written and directed by William Nigh, starring Vera Gordon

== Short film series ==
- Charlie Chaplin (1914–1923)
- Buster Keaton (1917–1941)
- Our Gang (1922–1944)

== Animated short film series ==
Felix the Cat cartoon.

- Felix the Cat (1919–1936)
- Koko the Clown (1919–1963)
- Aesop's Film Fables (1921–1934)

== Births ==
- January 2 – Jason Evers, American actor (died 2005)
- January 3 – Bill Travers, British actor, screenwriter, director and animal rights activist (died 1994)
- January 10 – Hannelore Schroth, German actress (died 1987)
- January 13 – Albert Lamorisse, French filmmaker, film producer and writer (died 1970)
- January 16 – Irene Vernon, American actress (died 1998)
- January 17 – Betty White, American actress and comedian (died 2021)
- January 19 – Guy Madison, American actor (died 1996)
- January 20 – Ray Anthony, American bandleader, trumpeter, songwriter and actor
- January 21
  - Telly Savalas, Greek-American actor (died 1994)
  - Paul Scofield, English actor (died 2008)
- January 31
  - Joanne Dru, American actress (died 1996)
  - William Sylvester, American actor (died 1995)
- February 3 – Ulf Johanson, Swedish actor (died 1990)
- February 4
  - William Edward Phipps, American actor and producer (died 2018)
  - Qin Yi, Chinese actress (died 2022)
- February 6 – Patrick Macnee, British-American actor (died 2015)
- February 7 – Hattie Jacques, English actress (died 1980)
- February 8 – Audrey Meadows, American actress (died 1996)
- February 9 – Kathryn Grayson, American actress and coloratura soprano (died 2010)
- February 24 – Steven Hill, American actor (died 2016)
- February 26 – Margaret Leighton, English actress (died 1976)
- March 5
  - James Noble, American actor (died 2016)
  - Pier Paolo Pasolini, Italian poet, writer, film director, actor and playwright (died 1975)
- March 8 – Cyd Charisse, American dancer and actress (died 2008)
- March 20 – Carl Reiner, American actor, author, comedian, director and screenwriter (died 2020)
- March 21 – Russ Meyer, American filmmaker (died 2004)
- March 23 – Ugo Tognazzi, Italian actor, director, and screenwriter (died 1990)
- March 31
  - Richard Kiley, American actor and singer (died 1999)
  - Patrick Magee, Irish actor (died 1982)
- April 3 – Doris Day, American actress and singer (died 2019)
- April 4
  - Elmer Bernstein, American composer and conductor (died 2004)
  - Alexandra Myšková, Czech-born Norwegian actress, director and theatre teacher
- April 5 – Gale Storm, American actress and singer (died 2009)
- April 7 – Margia Dean, American beauty queen and actress (died 2023)
- April 15 – Michael Ansara, Syrian‐American actor (died 2013)
- April 18 – Barbara Hale, American actress (died 2017)
- April 24 – J. D. Cannon, American actor (died 2005)
- April 26 – Mike Kellin, American actor (died 1983)
- April 27 – Jack Klugman, American actor (died 2012)
- May 2 – Roscoe Lee Browne, American actor and director (died 2007)
- May 7
  - Rolands Kalniņš, Latvian film director, screenwriter and producer (died 2022)
  - Darren McGavin, American actor (died 2006)
- May 10 – Nancy Walker, American actress (died 1992)
- May 12 - Murray Gershenz, American character actor and entrepreneur (died 2013)
- May 13 - Truus Dekker, Dutch actress (died 2022)
- May 14
  - Richard Deacon, American actor (died 1984)
  - Terence Longdon, English actor (died 2011)
- May 17 - Wei Wei, Chinese actress (died 2023)
- May 18 - Bill Macy, American actor (died 2019)
- May 25 - Syd Heylen, Australian character actor and comedian (died 1996)
- May 27 – Christopher Lee, English actor and singer (died 2015)
- May 31 – Denholm Elliott, English actor (died 1992)
- June 1
  - Joan Caulfield, American actress and model (died 1991)
  - Joan Copeland, American actress (died 2022)
- June 9 – George Axelrod, American screenwriter and producer (died 2003)
- June 10
  - Judy Garland, American actress and singer (died 1969)
  - Bill Kerr, British-Australian actor, comedian and vaudevillian (died 2014)
- June 16 – Frances Rafferty, American actress, dancer, World War II pin-up girl and Metro-Goldwyn-Mayer contract player (died 2004)
- June 22 – Mona Lisa, Filipino actress (died 2019)
- June 26 – Eleanor Parker, American actress (died 2013)
- June 28 - Erik Bauersfeld, American radio dramatist and voice actor (died 2016)
- July 6 – William Schallert, American character actor (died 2016)
- July 9 - Manos Zacharias, Greek film director, cinematographer and actor
- July 11 – Gene Evans, American actor (died 1998)
- July 19 - Bess Meisler, American actress
- July 21 – Demeter Bitenc, Slovenian actor (died 2018)
- July 23 - Sydney Lassick, American character actor (died 2003)
- July 26
  - Blake Edwards, American filmmaker, producer, and screenwriter (died 2010)
  - Jason Robards, American actor (died 2000)
- July 27
  - Adolfo Celi, Italian film actor and director (died 1986)
  - Norman Lear, American screenwriter and producer (died 2023)
- August 1
  - Arthur Hill, Canadian actor (died 2006)
  - Paul Lambert, American character actor (died 1997)
- August 8 – Rory Calhoun, American actor (died 1999)
- August 15 - Boris Sichkin, Soviet-American film actor, dancer, choreographer, composer and entertainer (died 2002)
- August 22 – Micheline Presle, French actress (died 2024)
- August 25 - Gloria Dea, American actress, dancer, artist, and magician (died 2023)
- September 1
  - Vittorio Gassman, Italian actor, director, and screenwriter (died 2000)
  - Yvonne De Carlo, Canadian-American actress, dancer and singer (died 2007)
- September 6 – Elizabeth Lawrence, American actress (died 2000)
- September 8
  - Sid Caesar, American comic actor and comedian (died 2014)
  - Annabel Maule, British actress
- September 10 – Barbara Chilcott, Canadian actress (died 2022)
- September 14 – Michel Auclair, European actor (died 1988)
- September 15 – Jackie Cooper, American actor and director (died 2011)
- September 16
  - Guy Hamilton, English film director (died 2016)
  - Janis Paige, American actress and singer (died 2024)
- September 23 – Louise Latham, American actress (died 2018)
- September 24
  - Bert I. Gordon, American film director, producer, screenwriter, and visual effects artist (died 2023)
  - Theresa Merritt, American actress (died 1998)
- September 29 – Lizabeth Scott, American actress, singer, and model for the Walter Thornton Model Agency (died 2015)
- October 5 – Woodrow Parfrey, American actor (died 1984)
- October 7 – Martha Stewart, American actress (died 2021)
- October 8 – Eileen Essell, English actress (died 2015)
- October 9 - Fyvush Finkel, American actor and director (died 2016)
- October 20 – John Anderson, American character actor (died 1992)
- October 23 – Coleen Gray, American actress (died 2015)
- October 27 – Ruby Dee, American actress (died 2014)
- October 28 - Jack Murdock, American actor (died 2001)
- October 31 – Barbara Bel Geddes, American actress, artist and children's author (died 2005)
- November 3 - George Morrison, Irish director of documentary films (died 2025)
- November 9 – Dorothy Dandridge, American actress and singer (died 1965)
- November 12 – Kim Hunter, American actress (died 2002)
- November 13
  - Madeleine Sherwood, Canadian actress (died 2016)
  - Oskar Werner, Austrian actor (died 1984)
- November 14 – Veronica Lake, American actress (died 1973)
- November 15 – Francesco Rosi, Italian film director and screenwriter (died 2015)
- November 16 – Royal Dano, American actor (died 1994)
- November 17 - Ted Beniades, American character actor (died 2014)
- November 22 – Lynne Roberts, American actress (died 1978)
- November 26 – Adam Williams, American actor (died 2006)
- November 27 - Jacqueline White, American former actress
- November 29 – Laurie Main, Australian actor (died 2012)
- December 2
  - Don Fellows, American actor (died 2007)
  - Leo Gordon, American actor and screenplay writer (died 2000)
- December 3 - Len Lesser, American character actor (died 2011)
- December 4 – Gérard Philipe, French actor (died 1959)
- December 9 – Redd Foxx, American stand-up comedian and actor (died 1991)
- December 11 – Dilip Kumar, Indian actor and film producer (died 2021)
- December 21 – Paul Winchell, American ventriloquist, comedian, actor, humanitarian, and inventor (died 2005)
- December 22 – Ruth Roman, American actress (died 1999)
- December 24 – Ava Gardner, American actress (died 1990)
- December 26 – Alfred Dennis, American actor (died 2016)
- December 28
  - Ivan Desny, French actor (died 2002)
  - Stan Lee, American comic-book, editor, publisher and producer (died 2018)

== Deaths ==
- February 1 – William Desmond Taylor, film director, victim of an unsolved and widely publicised murder which provoked a great scandal. (born 1872)
- February 4 – Florence Deshon, American actress (born 1893)
- March 4 – Bert Williams, American actor and singer (born 1874)
- May 21 – Sidney Ainsworth, actor (born 1872)
- May 26 – Walter Jones, American actor (b.1874)
- June 6 – Lillian Russell, stage and screen actress (born 1860/61)
- June 15 – Howard Crampton, actor (born 1865)
- July 5 – Bobby Connelly, child star (born 1909)
- September 23 – W. Chrystie Miller, veteran stage & screen actor (born 1843)
- November 30 – René Cresté, actor and director (born 1881)

== Film debuts ==
- Fortunio Bonanova – Don Juan Tenorio
- Clara Bow – Beyond the Rainbow
- Elga Brink – Lust for Life
- Betty Bronson – Anna Ascends
- Lon Chaney Jr. – The Trap
- Lili Damita – L'Empereur des pauvres
- Alfredo del Diestro – María
- Marfa Dhervilly – Prix de beauté
- Ann Doran – Robin Hood
- Louise Dresser – The Glory of Clementina
- James Gleason – Polly of the Follies
- William Haines – Brothers Under the Skin
- Jeanne Helbling – Les Roquevillard
- Edward Everett Horton – Too Much Business
- Ursula Jeans – A Gipsy Cavalier
- Hazel Keener – Penrod
- Walter Kingsford – Sherlock Holmes
- Frederick Leister – The Glorious Adventure
- Gene Lockhart – Smilin' Through
- Anita Louise – Down to the Sea in Ships
- Jeanne Loury – Triplepatte
- Arlette Marchal – Mon p'tit
- Garry Marsh – Long Odds
- Malcolm McGregor – The Prisoner of Zenda
- George O'Brien – White Hands
- William Powell – Sherlock Holmes
- Emma Roldán – María
- David Sharpe – Sherlock Holmes
- Anne Shirley – The Hidden Woman
- Valeska Stock – Der Bekannte Unbekannte
- Norma Varden – The Glorious Adventure
- Warren William – The Town That Forgot God
- Ian Wilson – A Master of Craft
- Roland Young – Sherlock Holmes
