= Die Opernprobe =

Comic opera by Albert Lortzing, 1851

- Spieloper by Albert Lortzing
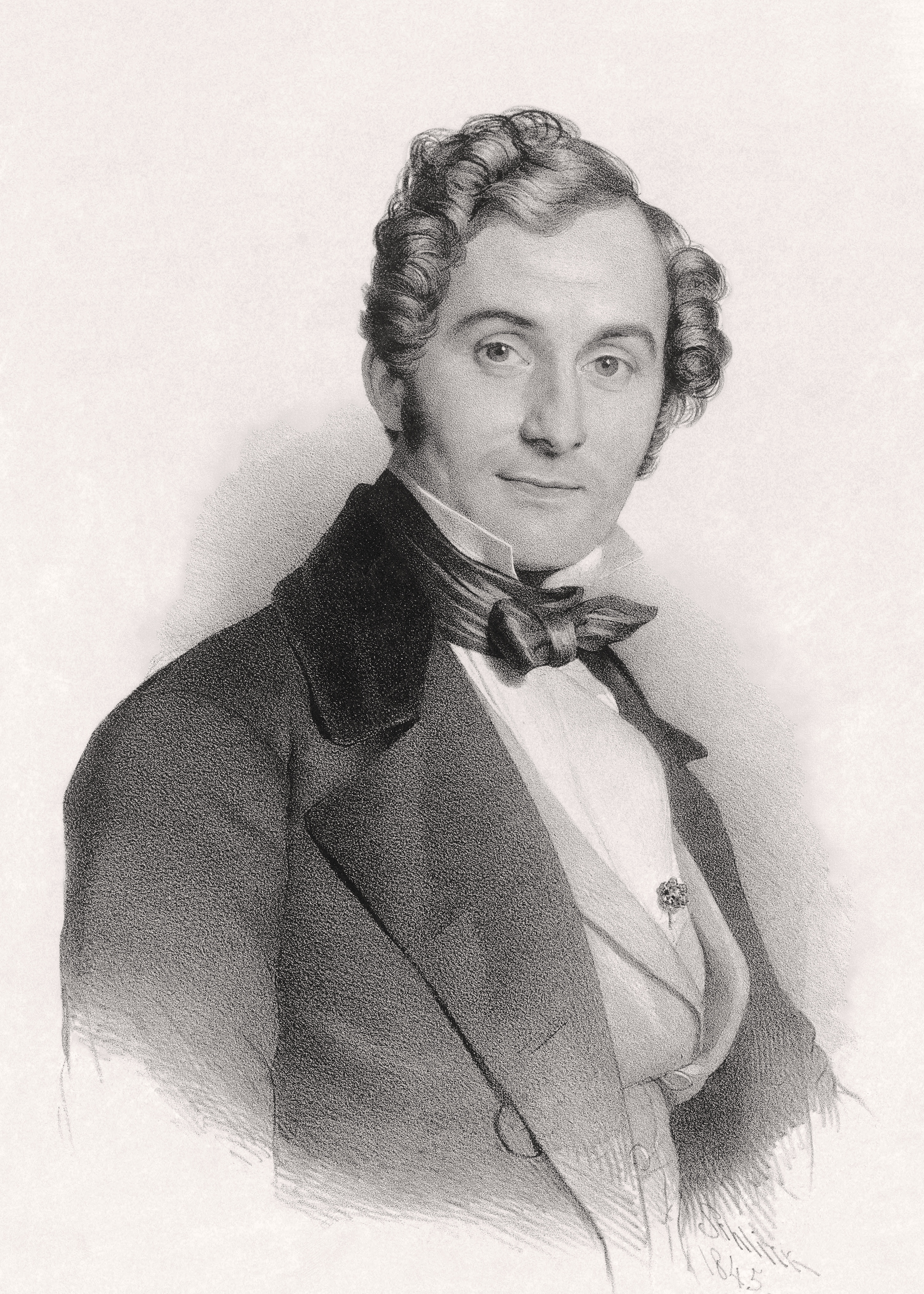
- Lortzing in 1845, drawing by Gustav Schlick
- Other title: Die vornehmen Dilettanten
- Librettist: Albert Lortzing
- Language: German
- Based on: Play by Philippe Poisson, translated by Johann Friedrich Jünger
- Premiere: 20 January 1851; Oper Frankfurt

Die Opernprobe (The opera rehearsal), also titled Die vornehmen Dilettanten (The distinguished dilettantes), is a comic opera (Spieloper) in one act by Albert Lortzing, to a libretto which he adapted from a play by Philippe Poisson which had been translated by Johann Friedrich Jünger. The premiere was on 20 January 1851 at the Oper Frankfurt.

== History ==
Lortzing was a successful composer of Spielopern, comic operas with spoken dialogue, from Zar und Zimmermann in 1837 to Der Waffenschmied in 1846. He composed Die Opernprobe in 1850 when he was director of the Neues Friedrich-Wilhelmstädtisches Theater in Berlin, which rarely played operas. For the libretto, he freely adapted a 1733 French play by Philippe Poisson, L'Impromptu de campagne, which Johann Friedrich Jünger had translated to German in 1794, as Die Komödie aus dem Stegreif (The improvised comedy). Lortzing had appeared as a character in the play in Cologne in 1825.

Die Opernprobe premiered on 20 January 1851 at the Oper Frankfurt in a double-bill with Friedrich Kaiser's comedy Junker und Knecht. The evening was a benefit performance for Samuel Friedrich Hassel who sang the role of The Count. Lortzing, who had been suffering from ill-health and was under considerable stress in his position as the conductor at the newly opened Friedrich-Wilhelmstädtisches Theater in Berlin, was not involved in the preparations for the Frankfurt premiere, nor did he attend the opening night. On the evening of 20 January he had planned to attend a performance of The Barber of Seville at the Königliches Opernhaus in Berlin with his friend Heinrich Otto Stotz. Instead, he returned home and went to bed early. He suffered a stroke during the night and died the next morning.

Unbeknownst to Lortzing, his last opera had a very successful premiere in Frankfurt and remained in the repertoire in Germany until after World War II. It was published by Bartholf Senff in Leipzig in 1899.

== Roles ==
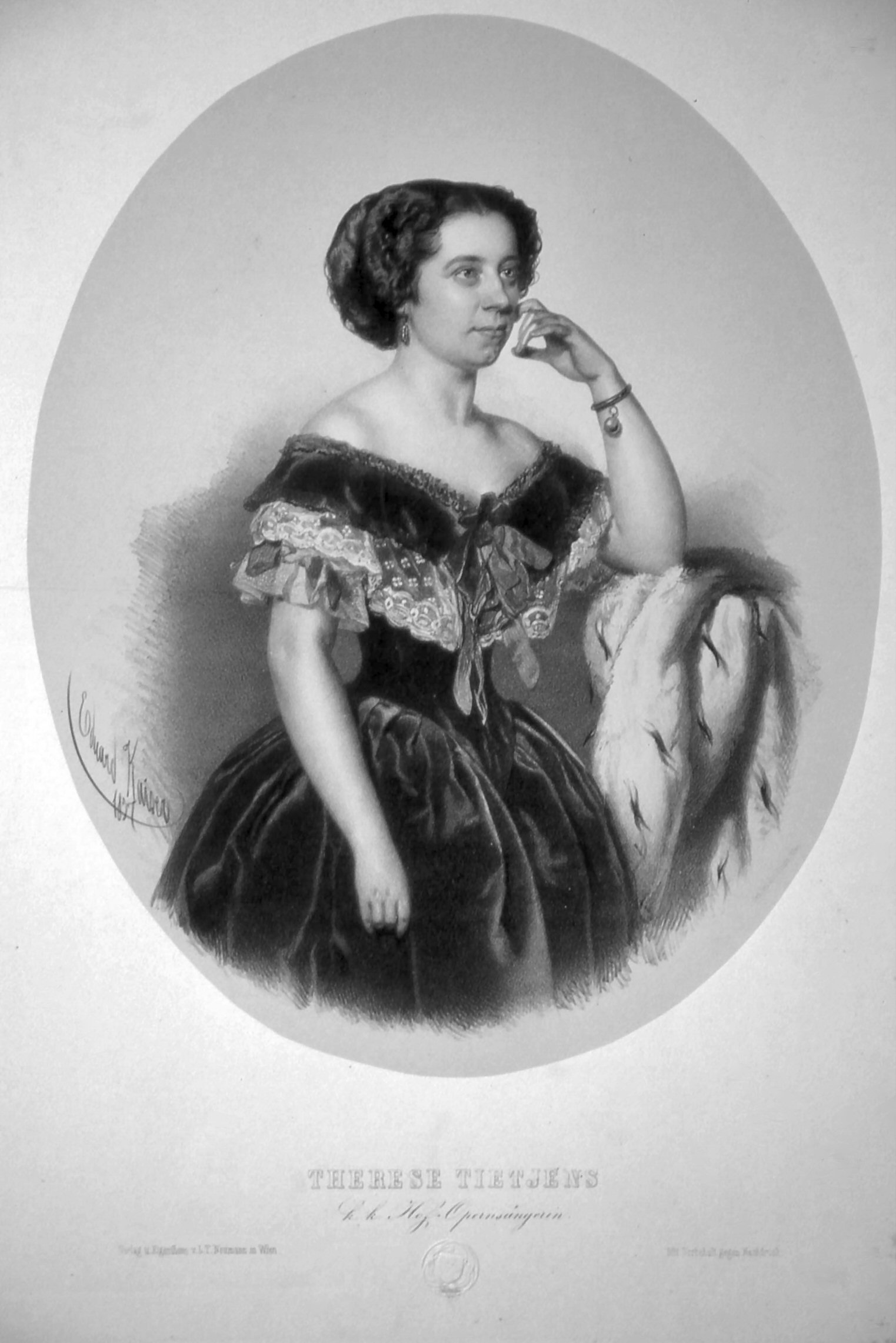
Therese Tietjens who sang the role of Louise in the premiere at the Oper Frankfurt

Roles, voice types, premiere cast
Role	Voice type	Premiere cast, 20 January 1851
The Count	bass	Samuel Friedrich Hassel
The Countess	mezzo-soprano	Frau Röhrig
Louise, their daughter	soprano	Therese Tietjens
Hannchen, Louise's maid servant	soprano	Karoline Denemy-Ney
Baron Reintal	bass	Robert Leser
Baron Adolph von Reintal, Baron Reintal's nephew	tenor	Friedrich Caspari
Johann, Baron Adolph von Reintal's servant	baritone	Carl Anton Meinhold
Martin, the Count's servant	bass	Herr Krug
Christoph, the Count's servant	bass	Herr Wimmer
Female and male servants

== Synopsis ==
The action is an opera rehearsal in a hall of a count's palace with a view towards the garden, in 1794. The amateur performers include the servants. Hannchen, a servant, is the conductor. The story includes a strange nobleman who had escaped an arranged marriage to a woman he did not know. He falls in love with Louise and in the end, after complications, finds out that she was the bride his uncle had planned for him.

== Recordings ==
Die Opernprobe was recorded in 1951, the 100th anniversary of the premiere, with singers including Helmut Krebs, Lisa Otto and the RIAS Kammerchor. A 1974 recording, with the choir and orchestra of the Bavarian State Opera conducted by Otmar Suitner, features Regina Marheineke, Nicolai Gedda, Klaus Hirte and Walter Berry, among others.
