= Albert Lortzing =

German opera composer (1801–1851)

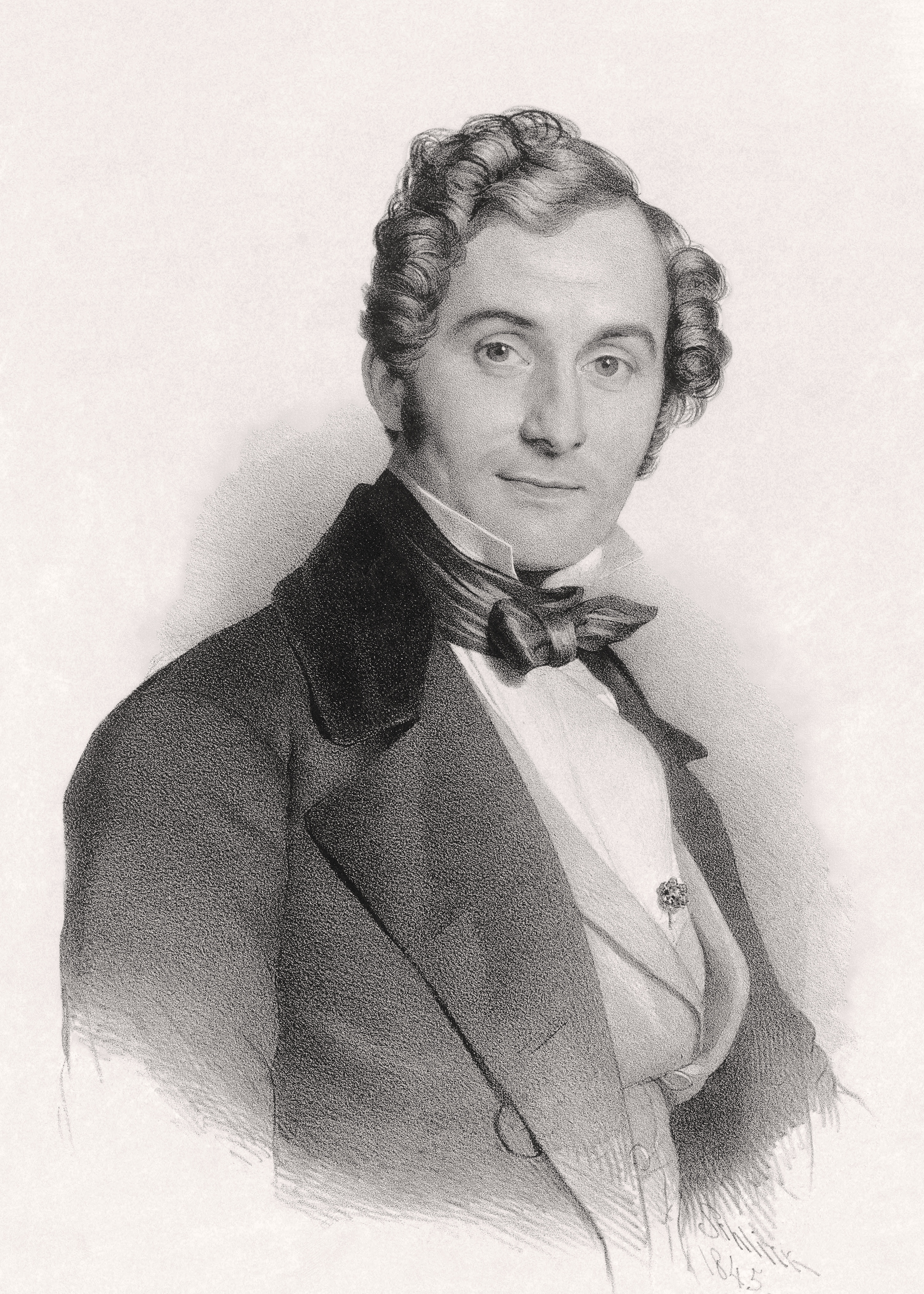
Albert Lortzing

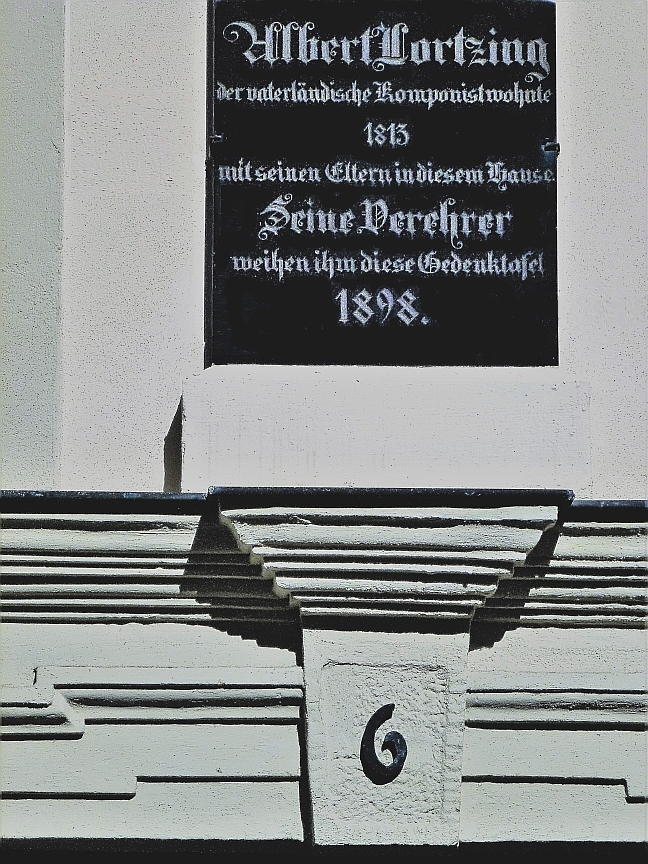
Memorial plate for Albert Lortzing - Coburg, at the house Gerbergasse 6

Gustav Albert Lortzing (23 October 1801 – 21 January 1851) was a German composer, librettist, actor and singer. He is considered to be the main representative of the German Spieloper, a form similar to the French opéra comique, which grew out of the Singspiel.

== Life and career ==
Lortzing was born in Berlin to Johann Gottlieb and Charlotte Sophie Lortzing. They had abandoned their leather shop and travelled through Germany as itinerant actors, founding the Berlin theatre company Urania, and turning their amateur passion into a profession. The young Lortzing's first stage appearance was at the age of 12, entertaining the audience with comic poems during the interval in the Kornhaus at the Freiburg Münster. From 1817, the Lortzing family were part of Josef Derossi ensemble in the Rhineland, treading the boards at Bonn, Düsseldorf, Barmen and Aachen. Albert Lortzing became an audience favourite, playing the roles of a youthful lover, a country boy and bon vivant, sometimes also singing small tenor or baritone roles.

On 30 January 1824 he married the actress Rosina Regine Ahles, with whom he subsequently had 11 children. The couple belonged to the Hoftheater (court theatre) in Detmold from late 1826, which toured to Münster and Osnabrück. Lortzing joined the Freemasons, a popular refuge for artists in Metternich's police state. Lortzing composed an oratorio in Detmold, Die Himmelfahrt Christi (Christ's Ascension), which premiered in Münster, and predictably earned a rebuke for the young composer from the Münster regional governor, who claimed that Lortzing was "a composer of no renown".

Lortzing composed the music for Christian Dietrich Grabbe's Don Juan und Faust, playing the role of Don Juan himself, with his wife as Donna Anna. Lortzing received a glowing report from an anonymous reviewer in a Frankfurt paper, who also mistakenly praised Lortzing for the text "by this brilliant poet". Grabbe, the real poet, was outraged, although the review did bring good publicity for the piece.

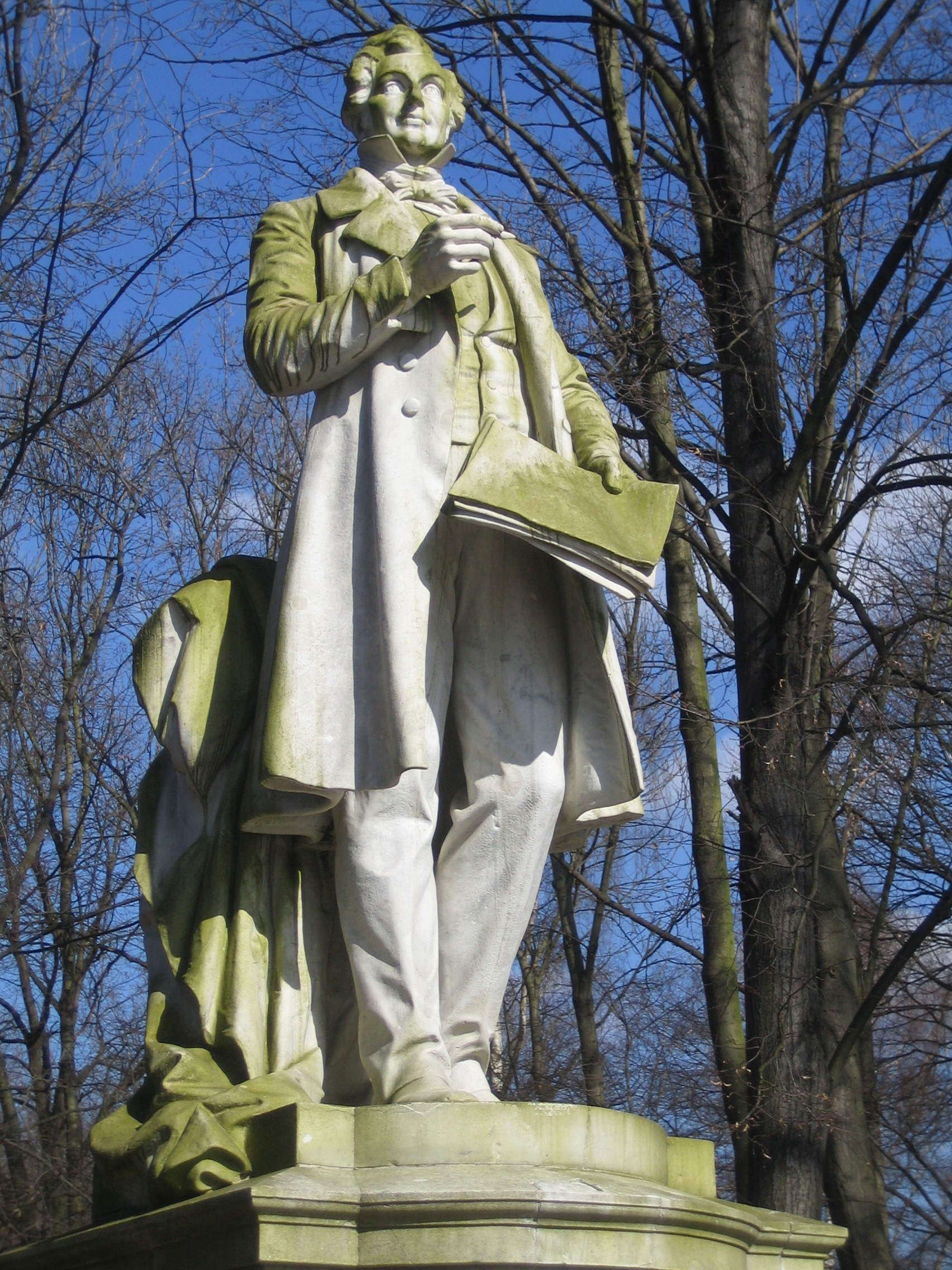
Lortzing's statue in the Berlin Tiergarten, by Gustav Eberlein

On 3 November 1833 the young Lortzings gave their debut at the Leipziger Stadttheater. Lortzing's parents had been members of this ensemble since 1832, under Friedrich Sebald Ringelhardt. Here, Lortzing became a member of the artists' club "Tunnel unter der Pleisse" ("Tunnel under the Pleiße"), and in 1834 he became a member of the Leipzig Freemasons lodge "Balduin zur Linde" ("Balduin to the Linden Tree"). Lortzing was much loved in the Leipzig ensemble, particularly when acting in Johann Nestroy's comedies. However, his tendency to improvise and to deviate from the script attracted the attention of the theatrical police.

His first comic opera, Zar und Zimmermann, had a tough time with the Leipzig censors. It premiered in Leipzig on 22 December 1837. Lortzing himself sang the role of Peter Iwanow, but it did not make a major breakthrough until its Berlin performances in 1839, where it was much praised.

In 1844, Lortzing became Kapellmeister of the Leipzig Stadttheater. After a quarrel with management, he was dismissed in April 1845 due to his "rheumatic troubles". The repeated protests of the public got him reinstated, but he was soon dismissed again after another argument. In an open letter, signed by almost everyone in the ensemble, he made a plea against the measures taken by the city government. In Leipzig he met and became friends with Robert Schumann, Clara Schumann and Felix Mendelssohn.

Between 1846 and 1848, Lortzing worked as Kapellmeister at the Theater an der Wien in Vienna. At the behest of the Freedom Movement, he wrote text and music in 1848 for his political opera Regina, named after his wife. This work concerned both labour struggles and fear of suicide. His last full-length opera was an 1849 fairy-tale satire of the Prussian military state called Rolands Knappen (Roland's Squires), featuring the repeated line "And this is supposed to be a world order?" ("Und das soll eine Weltordnung sein?")

In 1848 he lost his appointment and had to return to work as a touring actor to support his large family. He worked at Gera and Lüneburg, among other cities. Finally in 1850, he became the Kapellmeister in Berlin at the newly opened Friedrich-Wilhelmstädtisches Theater.

Lortzing also wrote music for masonic rituals.

On 20 January 1851, the night his musical comedy Die Opernprobe premiered in Frankfurt, Lortzing suffered a stroke at his home in Berlin and died without medical treatment on the morning of the following day, under huge stress and deeply in debt. A number of luminaries from the musical world were present at his funeral, including Giacomo Meyerbeer, Heinrich Dorn, Wilhelm Taubert and Carl Friedrich Rungenhagen. Lortzing's theatrical colleagues decorated his coffin with black, red and gold, a combination forbidden after 1848. A public benefit was then later held for his already impoverished family.

== Music ==
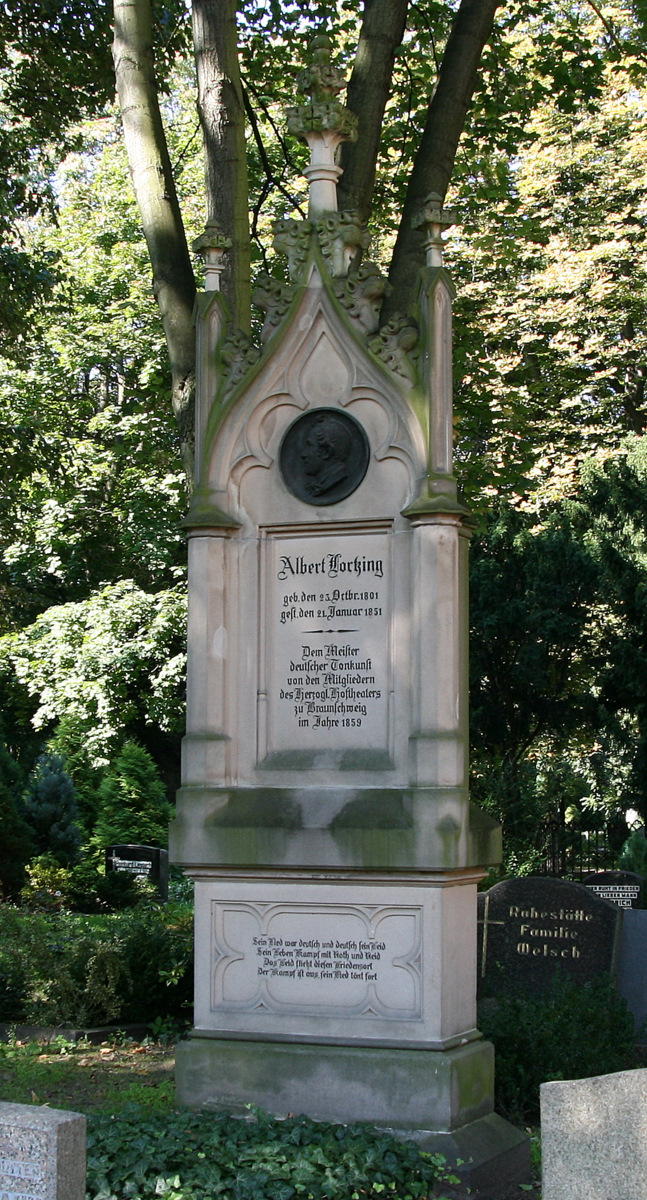
Lortzing's tomb in Berlin

His first singspiel, Ali Pascha von Janina, appeared in 1824, but his fame as a musician rests chiefly upon the two operas Zar und Zimmermann (1837) and Der Wildschütz (1842).

Zar und Zimmermann was received with very little enthusiasm by the public of Leipzig. However, at subsequent performances in Berlin there was a much more positive reaction. The opera soon appeared on all the stages of Germany, and today is regarded as one of the masterpieces of German comic opera. It was translated into English, French, Swedish, Danish, Dutch, Bohemian, Hungarian and Russian. The story is based around Tsar Peter I 'The Great' of Russia, who travelled to Germany, Holland and England disguised as a carpenter in order to gain first-hand technical knowledge he believed necessary for his country's economic progress, such as modern shipbuilding.

Der Wildschütz was based on a comedy by August von Kotzebue, and was a satire on the unintelligent and exaggerated admiration for the highest beauty in art expressed by the bourgeois gentilhomme. Of his other operas, Der Pole und sein Kind, produced shortly after the Polish insurrection of 1831, and Undine (1845) are notable. His Hans Sachs (on a subject later used by Wagner) was revived in 2024 in the city where it received its first performance, at the Musikalische Komödie Leipzig.

Lortzing was popular in Berlin and after his death, a memorial statue was erected in the Tiergarten in Berlin.

== Selected list of works ==
- Ali Pascha von Janina (1824)
- Die Himmelfahrt Christi (Christ's Ascension) – oratorio (premiered in Münster in 1828)
- Incidental music for Grabbe's Don Juan und Faust (1829)
- Der Pole und sein Kind (The Pole and His Child) (1831)
- Szenen aus Mozarts Leben (Scenes from Mozart's Life) (Münster 1832)
- Der Weihnachtsabend (Christmas Eve) (Münster 1832)
- Die beiden Schützen (The Two Riflemen) (Leipzig 1837)
- Zar und Zimmermann (Tsar and Carpenter) (Leipzig 1837)
- Hans Sachs (Leipzig 1840)
- Casanova (Leipzig 1841)
- Der Wildschütz (The Poacher) (Leipzig 1842)
- Undine (Magdeburg 1845)
- Der Waffenschmied (The Armourer) (Vienna 1846)
- Zum Groß-Admiral (1847)
- Regina (Vienna 1848) (called his freedom opera. Modified version first performed 1899, original version 1998)
- Rolands Knappen oder Das ersehnte Glück (Roland's Squire, or The Longed-For Happiness) (Leipzig 1849)
- Die Opernprobe (The Opera Rehearsal) (Frankfurt 1851)
