= Ali Pascha von Janina =

1828 opera by Albert Lortzing

- Singspiel by Albert Lortzing
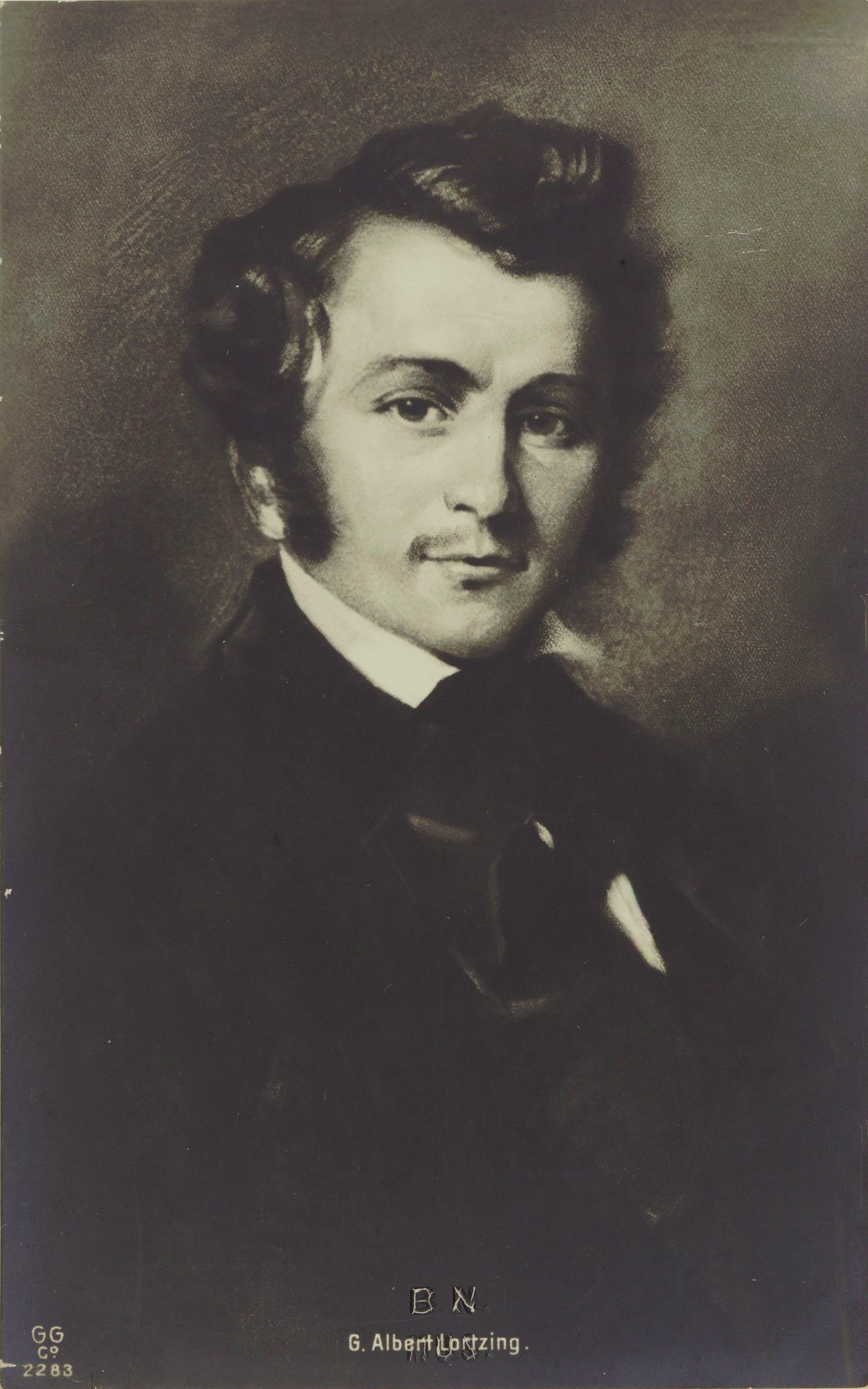
- The composer
- Librettist: Lortzing
- Language: German
- Premiere: 1 February 1828; Theater Münster

Ali Pascha von Janina oder Die Franzosen in Albanien (Ali Pasha of Ioannina or The French in Albania) is a one-act German singspiel. It is set around 1820 in Ioannina, then part of the Ottoman Empire and is named after its central character Ali Pasha of Yanina.

Its music and libretto are both by the German composer Albert Lortzing – it can be considered as a precursor to his later full-length operas. He had decided to write for the stage in 1823, aged 22. Orientalist subjects were then popular and so he chose that theme for his first work. On 30 January 1824 he married Rosina Regina Ahles and soon afterwards he completed the music, but it took him until 1828 to find a theatre which would mount the work.

The couple took on an engagement at the Hoftheater Detmold in autumn 1826, as well as appearing at Theater Münster and Theater Osnabrück. Lortzing finally premiered the work in Münster on 1 February 1828, followed on 21 April in Osnabrück and on 12 April in Detmold.

== Characters ==
- Ali Bey, Pasha of Joannina (bass)
- Ibrahim, overseer of the pasha's harem (bass)
- Captain Bernier (tenor)
- Lieutenant Robert, Bernier's friend (tenor)
- Arianna, a girl from Corfu (soprano)
- Soldiers, sailors, guards, slavegirls, slaves, imprisoned maidens (chorus)

== Plot ==
Stationed in Ioannina with his battalion, the French naval captain Bernier has fallen in love with Arianna, a beautiful girl from the nearby island of Corfu. However, he has not heard from her for days and is worried about what might have happened to her. Bernier's friend Robert tries in vain to comfort him.

Bernier's concerns prove justified – Arianna had been captured by a wild horde whilst out walking on the beach and taken to Ali Pasha's harem. Ali Pasha cannot bear her laments and complaints and orders her to forget Bernier since she now belongs to him alone. The other women in the harem are unwilling to raise Arianna's hopes and instead advise her that the only way to survive her suffering is to submit herself to fate and Ali Pasha's will.

In the meantime Bernier receives news of his beloved and gains entry to Ali Pasha's palace under a pretext. Ali Pasha is initially delighted to welcome a Frenchman and brings in Arianna to show her off to him, make Bernier envious and draw on Bernier's knowledge of women.

Bernier and Arianna find it hard to conceal their true feelings and pretend that they do not know each other, but only a few minutes after Ali Pasha leaves she admits to her love. Ali Pasha overhears this from a hiding place and rushes back in swearing vengeance. Bernier is chained up but Robert and the French battalion succeed in penetrating the harem. They free Bernier and Arianna and return with them to France.
