= The Country Kid =

1923 film by William Beaudine

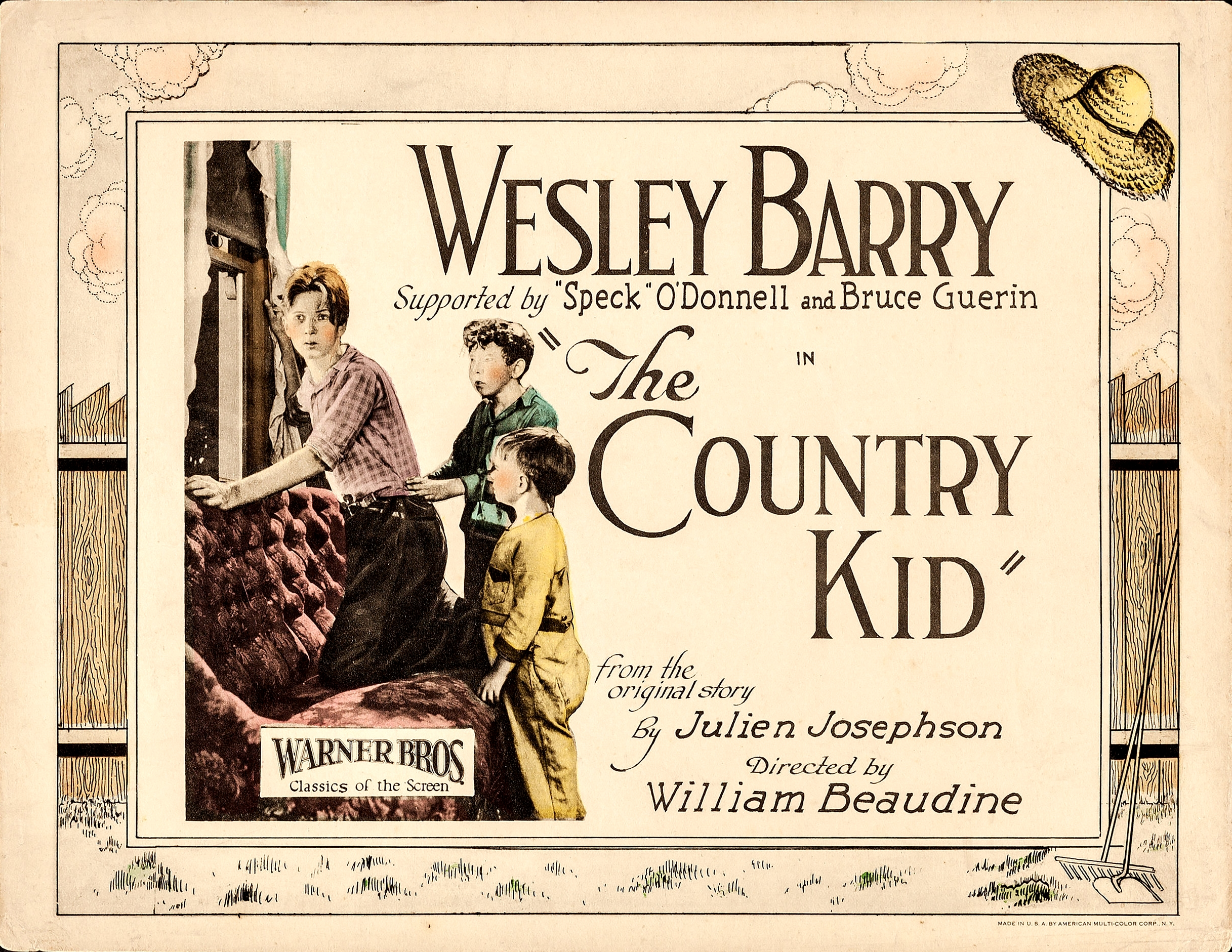
- Lobby card
- Directed by: William Beaudine
- Written by: Julien Josephson
- Starring: Wesley Barry
- Cinematography: Edwin B. DuPar
- Edited by: Clarence Kolster
- Production company: Warner Bros.
- Distributed by: Warner Bros.
- Release date: November 4, 1923
- Running time: 60 minutes
- Country: United States
- Language: Silent (English intertitles)
- Budget: $62,000
- Box office: $288,000

The Country Kid is a 1923 American silent comedy drama film directed by William Beaudine for Warner Bros. It stars Wesley Barry, Spec O'Donnell, and Bruce Guerin as three orphaned brothers who struggle to preserve their inheritance and remain together.

== Plot ==
Orphaned Ben Applegate (Barry) strives to care for his younger brothers (O'Donnell and Guerin) and run the farm left to them. Their unscrupulous legal guardian, Uncle Grimes (George Nichols) schemes to take their property and separate the brothers, but he is ultimately thwarted by a benevolent judge (George C. Pearce). The Applegates are reunited, their property restored, and they are adopted by caring neighbors.

== Cast ==
- Wesley Barry as Ben Applegate
- Spec O'Donnell as Joe Applegate
- Bruce Guerin as Andy Applegate
- Kate Toncray as Mrs. Grimes
- Helen Jerome Eddy as Hazel Warren
- George Nichols as Mr. Grimes
- Edmund Burns as Arthur Grant
- George C. Pearce as The County Judge

== Production ==
The story was conceived and written as a vehicle for popular child star Wesley Barry. Barry had been signed to a Warner contract by Harry Rapf in 1922 and was one of the studio's top draws at the time. William Beaudine had directed Barry with considerable success in Heroes of the Street (1922), which led to the pair working together on a number of Warner films, one of which was The Country Kid.

== Release ==
Released at the beginning of November 1923, The Country Kid was distributed on a state rights basis, as were all Warner pictures of the early 1920s.

It garnered mixed reviews. A number of critics found the film "trite" and melodramatic, and many commented on Barry's increasing age. The Variety reviewer reflected, "While there is no particular finesse in the way the picture is put together, the scenes in which the three kids figure hold a definite appeal for the countless thousands with a soft spot for homely sentiment."

=== Box Office ===
According to Warner Bros records the film earned $263,000 domestically and $25,000 foreign.

== Preservation ==
It is an extant film, archived in the David Bradley Film Collection at Indiana University and in the holdings of Warner Bros. A complete version and an abridged version are preserved. The Country Kid was one of the films purchased by Kodak for its Kodascope home library collection, the source of a number of abridged surviving films.
