= Rosina Regina Ahles =

German actress

- Born: 5 December 1799; Bietigheim, Holy Roman Empire
- Died: 13 June 1854 (aged 54); Berlin, Germany

Rosina Regina Ahles (5 December 1799, Bietigheim - 13 June 1854, Berlin) was a German actress, notable in her own right and as the wife of the actor, composer and writer Albert Lortzing.

== Life ==
She was the daughter of Johannes Ahles, a gravedigger in Bietigheim, and his wife, Regina Dorothea (née Kohlbrey). After the death of her father in 1804 and her mother in 1807, she and her older brother, Jakob Christoph, were sent to an orphanage in Stuttgart. She began her career as an actress at a young age at the court theatre there. She moved to the Rhineland in 1816, where she took on roles at the Derossi theater company (“A-B-C-Theater”) run by Caroline Müller. The Lortzing family also worked for Josef Derossi. Ahles shared the stage with them for the first time at a performance of Wilhelm Tell at the Aachen Comedy House on 14 November 1818. She played the role of Berta of Bruneck, and the young Albert Lortzing played the rifleman Stüßi. After that, the Lortzings and Ahles were often seen together on stage. They also moved together from Derossi to Friedrich Sebald Ringelhardt.

Rosina and Albert married on 30 January 1824. After their marriage ceremony, they took in Rosina's sister, Katharine Kupfer, and her daughter, Christine. After a quarrel with her sister, her daughter Christine remained with the Lortzings as a foster child. In total, Rosina Ahles gave birth to eleven children from 1826 to 1844. She had eight daughters and three sons, five of whom died in infancy.

Despite her frequent pregnancies, Rosina Ahles continued to work as an actress in Cologne, Aachen and Dresden. In January 1825, shortly after the birth of her first child, she acted in Schiller's "Phaedra" and in Lessing's "Nathan der Weise". Further plays in which she acted during this time were "Der Unschuldige muss viel leiden" by Theodor Hell, "Der Wunderschrank" by Holbein, and "Die Schuld" by Adolf Müllner.

In 1826, Albert and Rosina moved to the court theatre in Detmold while Albert's parents remained with Ringelhardt. Rosina played a total of 129 roles under the Detmold theatre director. In 1832 Ringelhardt took over the Stadttheater in Leipzig and summoned Albert and Rosina to his place, where they again met Albert's parents. The Lortzings lived in Leipzig for about a decade, and the rest of their children were also born there. Rosina retired from acting to devote her time to her role as a mother, while Albert, who had become a composer, obtained a position as a kapellmeister in 1844.

After Albert's dismissal in Leipzig, the family's path led through various stations to Vienna and Berlin, where Albert died in 1851. Rosina considered moving to relatives in Stuttgart, but soon fell ill and died in Berlin in 1854 at the age of 54. Like her husband three years earlier, she was buried in the Sophienfriedhof II. Unlike Albert Lortzing's grave, Rosina's grave was not preserved.

== Bibliography ==
- Hans Hoffmann: Rosina Lortzing aus Bietigheim – Ein Leben an der Seite des Komponisten. In: Blätter zur Stadtgeschichte, Heft 6, Bietigheim-Bissingen 1987, S. 101–123
