= Düsseldorfer Schauspielhaus =

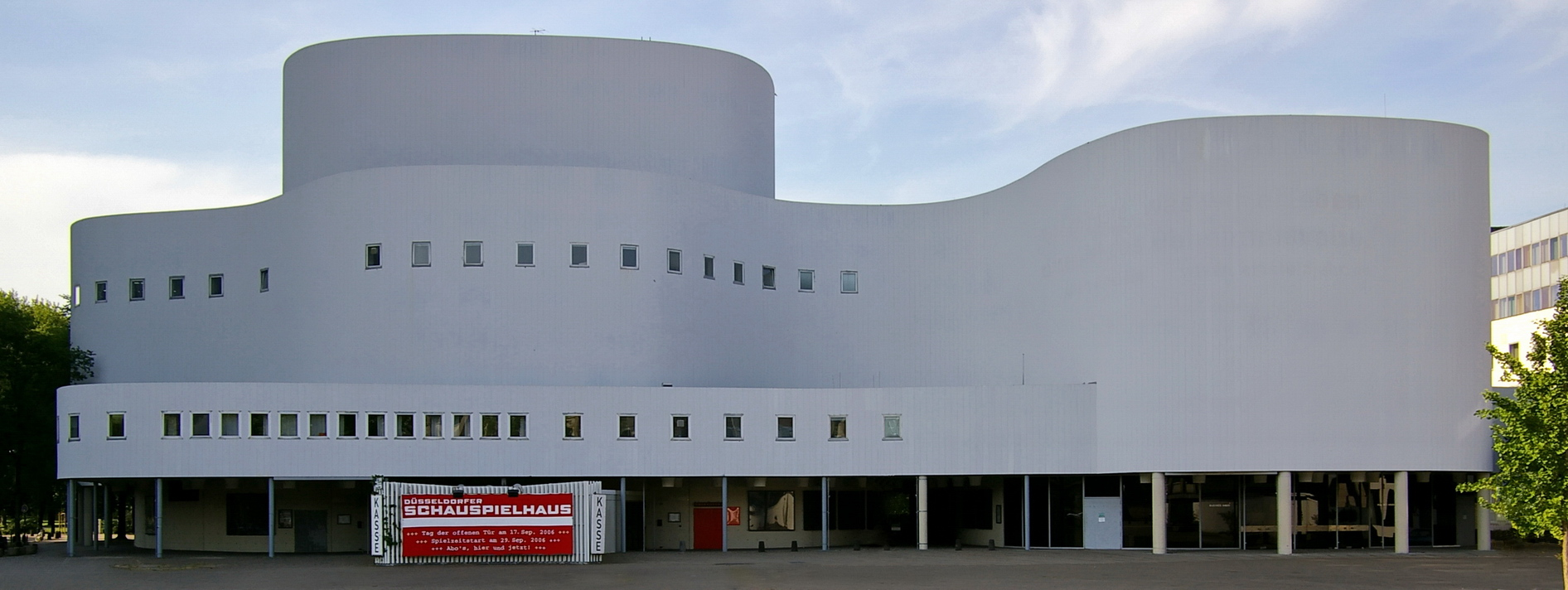
- The building in 2006
- Interactive map of the Düsseldorfer Schauspielhaus area

General information
- Type: Theatre
- Location: Düsseldorf, Germany
- Coordinates: 51.228146°N 6.783328°E
- Groundbreaking: 1965
- Opened: 1970

Design and construction
- Architect: Bernhard Pfau

Other information
- Seating capacity: 760 / 300

Website
- www.dhaus.de

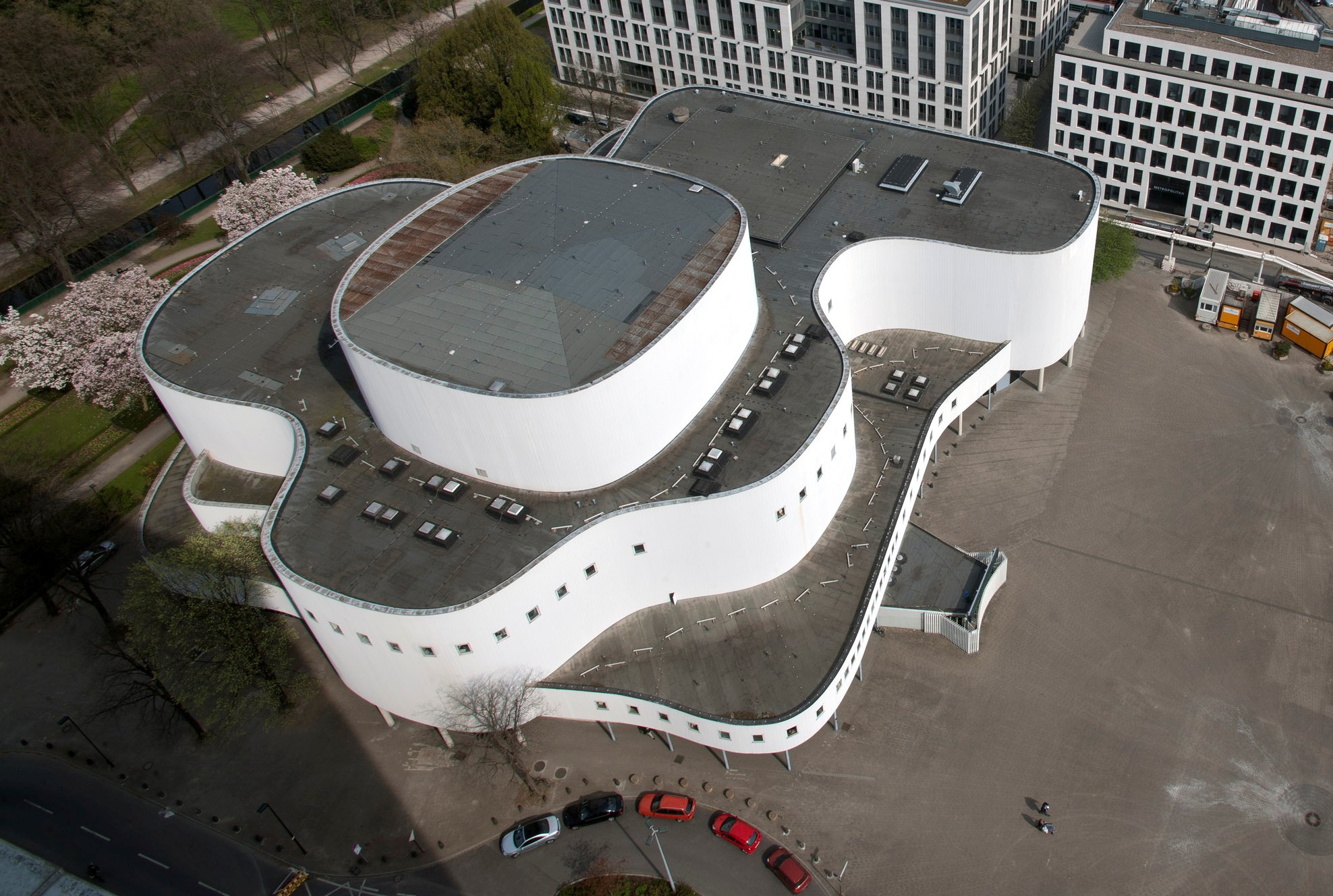
Aerial view of the theatre, in 2012

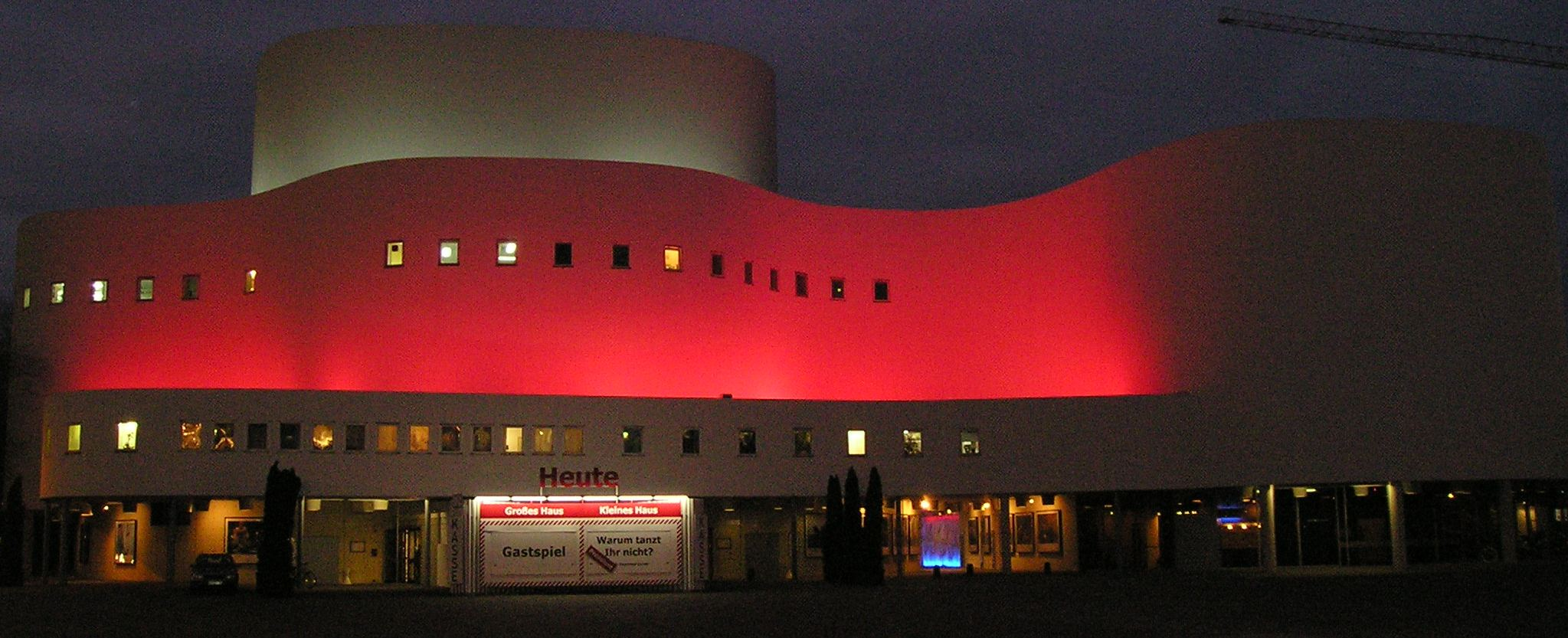
The illuminated building at night, in 2007

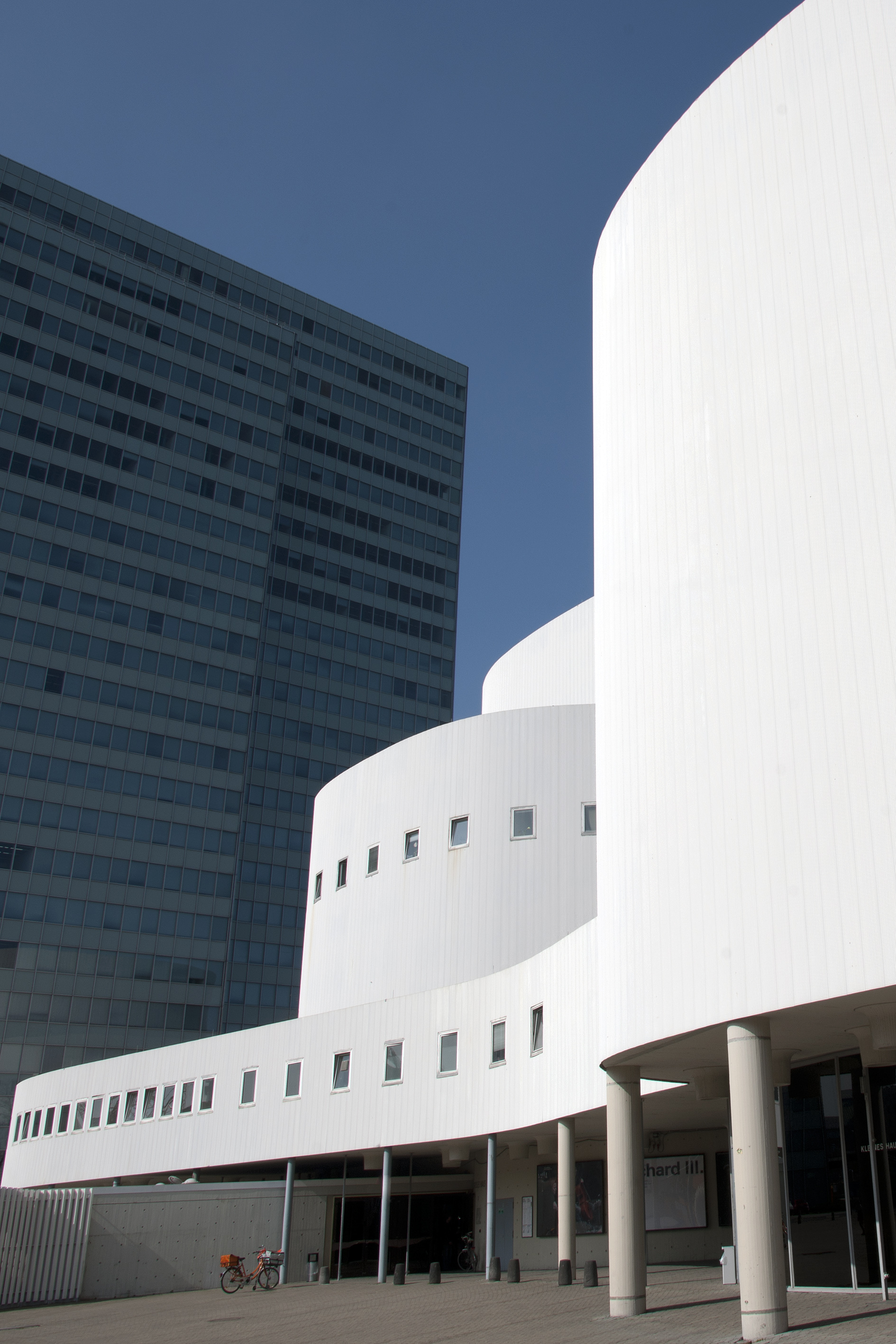
The theatre juxtaposed to the Dreischeibenhaus, in 2012

The Düsseldorfer Schauspielhaus is a theatre building and company in Düsseldorf. The present building with two major auditoria was designed by the architect Bernhard Pfau and built between 1965 and 1969. It opened in 1970.

== History ==
The theatre dates back to 1747 when during the reign of elector Karl Theodor the Gießhaus was transformed to a theatre. In 1818 Friedrich Wilhelm II donated this building to the city of Düsseldorf. Josef Derossi was its first director, succeeded in 1834 by the poet Karl Leberecht Immermann. In 1905 a house dedicated to plays was opened by Louise Dumont and Gustav Lindemann who brought the house to fame.

After World War II Wolfgang Langhoff was the first director, succeeded in 1946 by Gustaf Gründgens. His directions made the house one of the most important stages in Europe. In 1955 he was succeeded by Karl Heinz Stroux.

=== Present building ===
The present theatre was commissioned by the city of Düsseldorf during the tenure of Stroux. The Operettenhaus, which had served as a venue for performance of plays after World War II, proved too limited. In 1957 a new building was proposed, for which the site, on Gustaf-Gründgens-Platz, was secured in 1958. An international competition was held in 1959 and won by Pfau. The theatre is designed like a sculpture, juxtaposed to the nearby Dreischeibenhaus. The style has been described as organic architecture. The great hall (Großes Haus) seated 900 people then (now 760), the small hall (Kleines Haus) 300.

Construction took place from 1965 to 1969, and the theatre opened on 16 January 1970 with a performance of Georg Büchner's Dantons Tod.

In 1972 Ulrich Brecht succeeded Stroux as director, followed in 1974 by Günter Beelitz, then Volker Canaris. In 1996 Anna Badora was director, succeeded in 2006 by Amélie Niermeyer. Staffan Valdemar Holm was director from 2011, with four venues, Großes Haus, Kleines Haus, Junges Schauspielhaus (Young play house) and Central.

== Reference in software ==
A picture of the top of the Düsseldorfer Schauspielhaus is included as a desktop background, under section "Architecture" in the Windows 7 operating system (picture img15.jpg).

== Literature ==
- Claudia Elbert: Die Theater Friedrich Weinbrenners. Bauten und Entwürfe. Karlsruhe 1988, ISBN 978-3788073404.
- Clemens Klemmer: Meister der Moderne. Der Düsseldorfer Architekt Bernhard Pfau. In: Verlegergemeinschaft Werk, Bauen + Wohnen, 75.11,1988, S. 84–86.
- Hannelore Schubert: Moderner Theaterbau. Internationale Stationen, Dokumentationen, Projekte, Bühnentechnik. Stuttgart 1971, ISBN 3782804163, S. 168–170.
- Hans Schwab-Felisch: Das Düsseldorfer Schauspielhaus mit 135 Abbildungen. Düsseldorf 1970, ISBN 3430181941.
- Hans Schwab-Felisch: Fünfundsiebzig Jahre Düsseldorfer Schauspielhaus 1905–1980. ISBN 3430181941.
- Julius Niederwöhrmeier: Das Lebenswerk des Düsseldorfer Architekten Bernhard Pfau 1902–1989. Stuttgart 1997, ISBN 978-3782840330, S. 263–292.
- Markus Brüderlin (Hrsg.): Archiskulptur. Dialoge zwischen Architektur und Plastik vom 18. Jahrhundert bis heute. Ausst. Kat. 3. Oktober 2004–30. Januar 2005 in der Fondation Beyeler in Riehen. Basel, Ostfildern-Ruit 2004, ISBN 3-7757-1491-X
- Paul Ernst Wentz: Architekturführer Düsseldorf. Düsseldorf 1975, Objektnr. 12, ISBN 3-7700-0408-6.
- Peter Adamski: Mutation. In: Stattzeitung Nr. 165 (September 1989) S. 4–5.
- Winrich Meiszies (Hrsg.): Jahrhundert des Schauspiels. Vom Schauspielhaus Düsseldorf zum Düsseldorfer Schauspielhaus. Düsseldorf 2006, ISBN 3-77001242-9, S. 7–31/149–155/182–187.
