= Der Waffenschmied =

Opera by Albert Lortzing

- Singspiel by Albert Lortzing
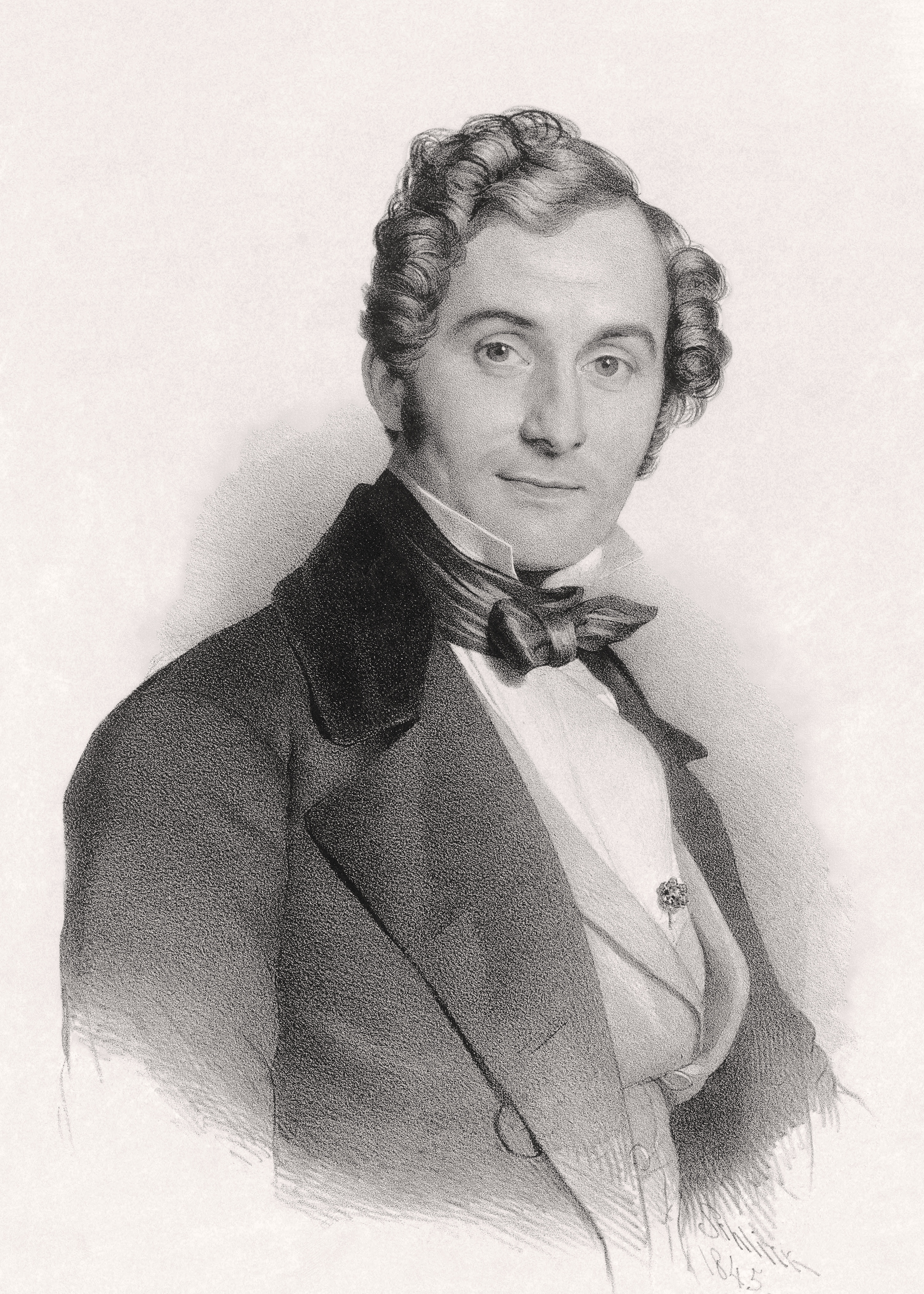
- The composer in 1845
- Translation: The Armourer
- Librettist: Lortzing
- Language: German
- Based on: Liebhaber und Nebenbuhler in einer Person by Friedrich Wilhelm von Ziegler
- Premiere: 31 May 1846; Theater an der Wien, Vienna

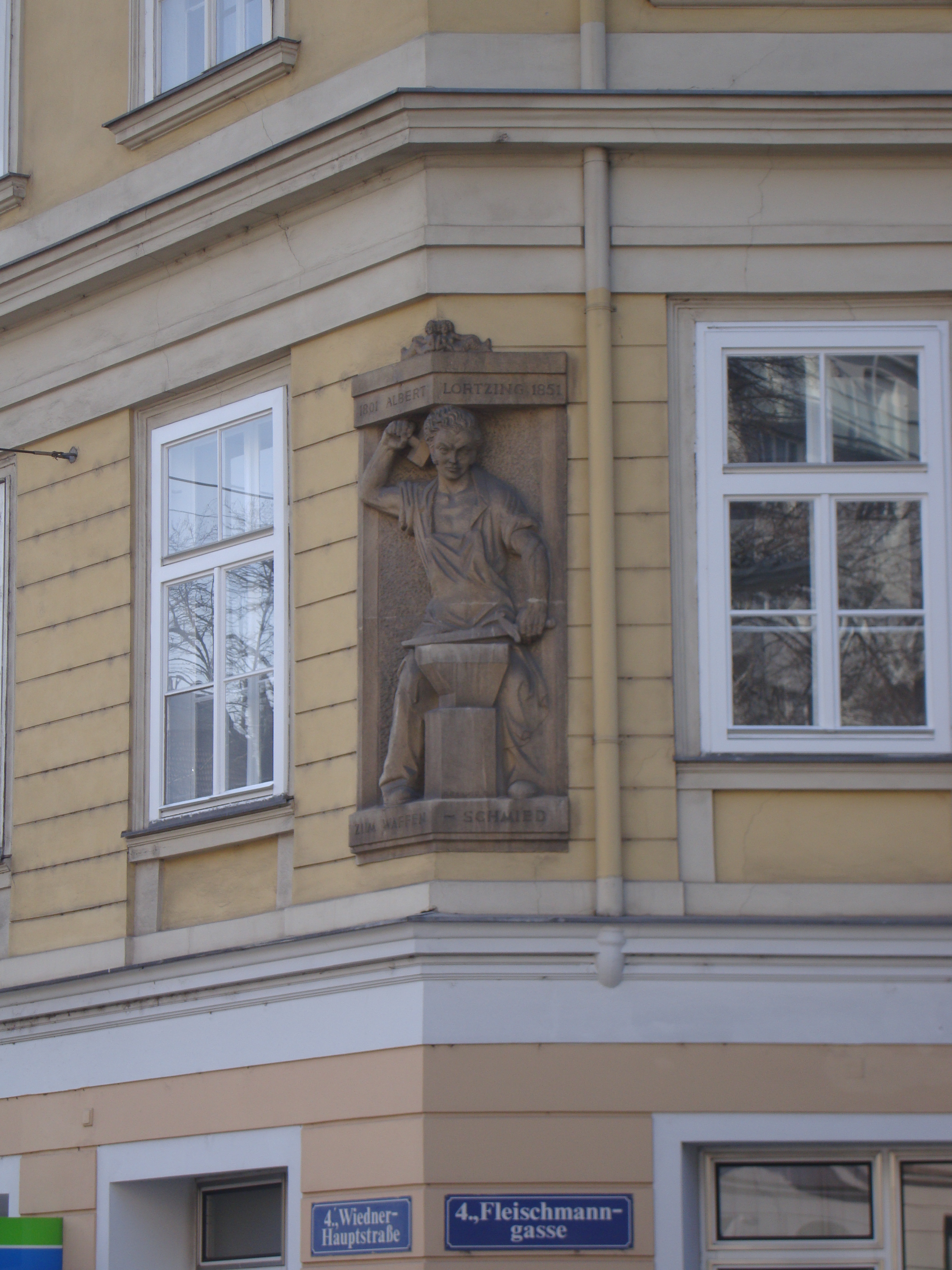
Der Waffenschmied – Relief in Vienna

Der Waffenschmied (The Armourer) is an opera (Singspiel) in three acts by Albert Lortzing. The German-language libretto was by the composer after Friedrich Wilhelm Ziegler's Liebhaber und Nebenbuhler in einer Person (Lover and Rival in One Person). This is often considered his third most popular work. His works are considered to be part of the Biedermeier period. It premiered in Vienna at the Theater an der Wien on 31 May 1846 conducted by Lortzing. The role of Marie was written with Jenny Lind in mind who he hoped would sing the part. The opera was eventually successful enough that Lortzing was offered the post of Kapellmeister at the theatre which he held until the revolution of 1848, when he had to return to Leipzig. Arnold Schoenberg arranged Lortzing's "Waffenschmied“ for piano for 4 hands. The story is set in the city of Worms in the 16th century.

== Roles ==
- Hans Stadinger, armourer and vet (bass)
- Marie, his daughter (soprano)
- Count Liebenau, nobleman in disguise as "Konrad", a journeyman blacksmith (baritone)
- Georg, Count Liebenau's squire (tenor)
- Adelhof, a knight (baritone)
- Irmentraut, Marie's governess (contralto)
- Brenner, an innkeeper and Standinger's brother-in-law (tenor)

== Synopsis ==
Act 1

Count von Liebenau loves Marie, the daughter of the armorer Stadinger (who is also a veterinarian) and wants nothing to do with Fräulein von Katzenstein. He wants her to love him for his own sake and not because of his noble title. Since the Stadinger also has rejected the noble candidate - because his wife was abducted by a Knight - Liebenau has come to work for him as a blacksmith journeyman named Konrad. Poor Marie is in distress, should she give her heart to the noble Knight or a simple blacksmith, because she loves both of them.

Stadinger invites his companions to his 25th anniversary of becoming a master armorer the next day after work. Entrusting Georg (Liebenau's Squire posing with his master as a blacksmith) for the arrangements because Stadinger must make a vet call on some sick cows. Georg sings of the joys of life (Man wird ja einmal nur geboren). Liebenau appears in his true form as a rich knight after all have gone to bed, yet once more makes love to Marie, and put her to the test (Gern gäb ich Glanz und Reichtum hin). But Marie finally rejects him, because she loves Konrad. She begins to doubt the sincerity of the count's love. Georg announces that Stadinger has returned. He discovers the count and Georg helps Liebenau to escape. After the commotion sparked by Stadinger has died down, Marie returns and listens at Konrad's door. Because he doesn't stir, she wishes him good night at his closed door (Er schläft).

Act 2

Liebenau in the role of the jealous journeyman Konrad, accuses Marie, of having a tryst with a count. After a short argument they are reconciled. In an intricate kissing scene, which also Irmentraut and Georg are involved, the suspicious Stadinger bursts in and tries in vain to find out who kissed who. Stadinger decides Konrad is fickle. The confusion becomes even greater when in waddles the Knight Adelhof, who warns Stadinger that Count Liebenau would like to see Konrad married to Marie. But Stadinger doesn't like the journeyman Konrad. Stadinger decides to marry his daughter off to Georg so that neither Konrad nor the Count will get her. Georg declines the offer.

At Stadinger's celebration Georg has to sing a song (War einst ein junger Springinsfeld). The party is abruptly interrupted by the Irmentraut who says that the Count has kidnapped his daughter. In fact the Count has put on this kidnapping by his men, so that as Konrad he can rescue her. He hopes that Stadinger will then give him Marie's hand out of gratitude. Stadinger thinks of sending her to a nunnery instead since he doesn't like Konrad.

Act 3

Marie complains of women's lot in life (Wir armen, armen Mädchen). To break Stadinger's obstinacy Liebenau has his armed men marching around the city. Stadinger's brother in-law reads aloud a letter allegedly from the City Council, in which Stadinger is required to marry his daughter to Konrad to keep the civic peace. Now, he has to give his consent. While he remembers his youth and how good life used to be (Auch ich war ein Jüngling mit lockigem Haar). The royally arrayed Knight comes with his young wife and numerous followers to thank his new father-in-law. Stadinger is incensed when he realizes that Count Liebenau and the journeyman Konrad are one and the same person and he has been outsmarted, but he finally blesses the couple and is satisfied with the turn of events.

== Recordings ==
- Der Waffenschmied Michael Bohnen, Carla Spletter, Erich Zimmermann, Erich Rauch, Hans Wocke, Margarethe Arndt-Ober, Orchester des Reichssenders Berlin, Leopold Hainisch, conductor Gustav Schlemm 1936
- Der Waffenschmied Günther Groissböck, Miriam Kutrowatz, Juliette Mars, Timothy Connor, Andrew Morstein, Arnold Schoenberg Chor, ORF Radio-Symphonieorchester Wien, Leo Hussain. 2CDs Capriccio
- Der Waffenschmied John Tomlinson, Ruth Ziesak, Boje Skovhus, Kjell Magnus Sandvé, Ursula Kunz, Chor des Bayerischen Rundfunks, Münchner Rundfunkorchester, Leopold Hager – Hänssler Classic
