= Zum Groß-Admiral =

Opera by Albert Lortzing

Zum Groß-Admiral (LoWV 74) is a comic opera in three acts by Albert Lortzing; it premiered on 13 December 1847 at the Altes Theater in Leipzig.

== Plot ==
The composer's libretto was based on a German translation by August Wilhelm Iffland of Alexandre Duval's La Jeunesse de Henri V. Henry, heir to the English throne, likes to escape from his duties and enjoys nocturnal adventures. But his wife Catharina and the Count of Rochester set a trap at the tavern The Great Admiral.

== Recording ==
- Anett Fritsch, Bernhard Berchtold, Lavinia Dames, Jonathan Michie, Martin Blasius, Munich Radio Orchestra, Ulf Schirmer : CPO 2019
