= List of French films of 1922 =

French films released in 1922

A list of films produced in France in 1922:

| Title | Director | Cast | Genre | Notes |
|---|---|---|---|---|
| Crainquebille | Jacques Feyder | Maurice de Féraudy | Drama | |
| The Crime of Bouif | Henri Pouctal | Félicien Tramel, Henri Gouget, Thérèse Kolb | Comedy | |
| Don Juan et Faust | Marcel L'Herbier | Jacques Catelain, Marcelle Pradot | | |
| Gonzague | Henri Diamant-Berger | Maurice Chevalier, Nina Myral | | |
| The Hurricane on the Mountain | Julien Duvivier | Lotte Lorring, Gaston Jacquet | Mystery | |
| King of the Camargue | André Hugon | Charles de Rochefort, Elmire Vautier, Claude Mérelle | Drama | |
| Jean Legrand | | | | |
| Jocelyn | Léon Poirier | Armand Tallier, Suzanne Bianchetti | | |
| L'agonie des aigles | Dominique Bernard-Deschamps; Julien Duvivier | Gaby Morlay | Historical | |
| L' amie d' enfance | Félix Léonnec | | | |
| L' Arlésienne | André Antoine | Lucienne Breval, Marthe Fabris | Drama | |
| L'âtre | Robert Boudrioz | | | |
| L'écuyère | Léonce Perret | | | |
| L'équipe | Maurice Lagrenée | | | |
| L'idée de Françoise | Robert Saidreau | | | |
| La bâillonnée | Charles Burguet | | | |
| La belle au bois dormant (1922 film) | Passet | | | |
| La bête traquée | René Le Somptier and Michel Carré | | | |
| La bouquetière des innocents | Jacques Robert | Albert Decoeur, Lilian Constantini | Adventure | |
| La Femme de nulle part | Louis Delluc | Ève Francis, Roger Karl | | |
| La fille des chiffonniers | Henri Desfontaines | Blanche Montel, Madeleine Guitty | Comedy | |
| La loupiote | Georges Hatot | | | |
| La maison dans la forêt | Jean Legrand | C. Lorraine, Jean Angelo | | |
| La maison du mystère | Alexandre Volkoff | Ivan Mosjoukine, Charles Vanel | Serial | |
| La résurrection du Bouif | Henri Pouctal | Charles Lamy, Paul Amiot | | |
| La riposte | Victor Tourjansky | Nathalie Lissenko, Jean Angelo | | |
| La Souriante Madame Beudet | Germaine Dulac | Germaine Dermoz | Drama | |
| Le crime de Monique | Robert Péguy | Jean Toulout, Simone Sandre | Crime | |
| Le Diamant noir | André Hugon | Claude Mérelle, Ginette Maddie | Mystery | |
| Le filon du Bouif | Louis Osmont | | | |
| Le fils du flibustier | Louis Feuillade | | | |
| Le grillon du foyer | Jean Manoussi | | | |
| Le lac d'argent | Gaston Roudès | | | |
| Le Mauvais garçon | Henri Diamant-Berger | Maurice Chevalier, Marguerite Moreno | | |
| Le Mouton noir | Chalux | | | |
| Le sang des Finoël | Georges Monca, Rose Pansini | | | |
| Les deux pigeons | André Hugon | Armand Bernard, Germaine Fontaines | | |
| Les hommes nouveaux | Edouard-Emile Violet | | | |
| Les Mystères de Paris (1922 film) | Charles Burguet | Huguette Duflos, Georges Lannes | Serial | |
| Les opprimés | Henry Roussell | | | |
| Lord Arthur Savile's Crime | René Hervil | Cecil Mannering, André Dubosc, André Nox | Mystery | |
| Maman Pierre | Maurice Challiot | | | |
| Margot | Guy Du Fresnay | | | |
| Molière, sa vie, son œuvre | Jacques De Féraudy | | | |
| Mon p'tit | René Plaissetty | | | |
| Notre Dame d'amour | André Hugon | Claude Mérelle, Jean Toulout | | |
| Roger la Honte | Jacques de Baroncelli | Rita Jolivet, Gabriel Signoret | Historical | |
| Rouletabille chez les bohémiens | Henri Fescourt | | Serial | |
| Sans fortune | Géo Kessler | | | |
| Son Altesse | Henri Desfontaines | | | |
| Son excellence le Bouif | Louis Osmont | | | |
| Triplepatte | Raymond Bernard | Henri Dabain, Édith Jéhanne | Comedy | |
| Vingt Ans Apres | Henri Diamant-Berger | Jean Yonnel, Henri Rollan | | |
| Werther | | | | |

== See also ==
- 1922 in France
