= Dudley Manlove =

American radio announcer and actor (1914–1996)

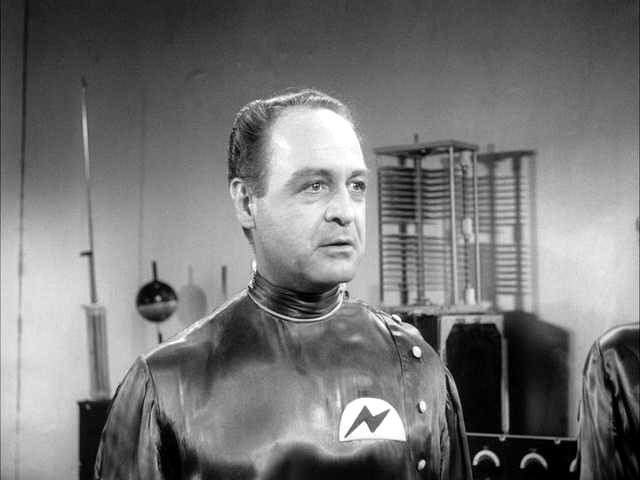
- Manlove as Eros in Ed Wood's Plan 9 from Outer Space (1957)
- Born: Dudley Devere Manlove; June 11, 1914; Alameda County, California, U.S.
- Died: April 17, 1996 (aged 81); San Bernardino County, California, U.S.
- Occupations: Actor, radio announcer
- Spouse(s): Ora (1940–1945); Patricia Prichard (1947–1954)

Dudley Devere Manlove (June 11, 1914 – April 17, 1996) was an American radio announcer and an actor. His credits include the San Francisco–based radio detective show Candy Matson, YUkon 2-8209.

== Early years ==
In 1921, Manlove was one of a group of juvenile performers sponsored by the Oakland Tribune. Also in 1921, at age 6, he received a contract from the Stewart Motion Picture Company. At that time, he already had more than a year's experience on stage.

== Radio ==
Manlove worked on radio station KLX in Oakland, California, acting on the Eight o'Clock Players and the Faucit Theater of the Air. He also was host of The Musical Clock morning program on KYA in San Francisco.

Manlove's voice was his trademark as a radio announcer and actor.

== Film and television ==
Manlove is known for his roles in the science fiction B movies The Creation of the Humanoids and Plan 9 from Outer Space. Writing for Film Threat, critic Josiah Teal described Manlove's performance in Plan 9 as "over the top," with critic James Berardinelli writing that the acting in the film was "lacking".

Manlove also had multiple guest-starring roles in the television series Dragnet and Alfred Hitchcock Presents.

== Personal life ==
On September 20, 1940, Manlove and his wife, Ora, married in Reno. She sued him for divorce on February 8, 1945. In 1947, he married singer Patricia Prichard in Santa Clara, California. They divorced in 1954.

== Death ==
On April 17, 1996, Manlove died in San Bernardino, California, of cirrhosis of the liver at the age of 81.

== Radio ==
Year	Title	Role	Notes
1949	Candy Matson	Announcer	

== Filmography ==
Year	Title	Role	Notes
1957	Final Curtain	Narrator	
1957	State Trooper	Prosecuting Attorney	Episode: "Madman on the Mountain"
1957	Plan 9 from Outer Space	Eros	
1957 to 1959	Dragnet		2 episodes
1958	Ten North Frederick	Ted Wallace	Uncredited
1958	Official Detective	Arnold	Episode: "Extortion"
1958	Alfred Hitchcock Presents	Charlie Harris	Season 3 Episode 19: "The Equalizer"
1960	Alfred Hitchcock Presents	George	Season 6 Episode 8: "O Youth and Beauty!"
1961	The Runaway	Minor Role	Uncredited
1962	The Creation of the Humanoids	Lagan	Alternative title: Revolt of the Humanoids
