= Racing Blood (1954 film) =

1954 film by Wesley Barry

- Theatrical release poster
- Directed by: Wesley Barry
- Screenplay by: Samuel Roeca
- Story by: Wesley Barry; Samuel Roeca
- Produced by: Wesley Barry
- Starring: Bill Williams; Jean Porter; Jimmy Boyd; George Cleveland; John Eldredge; Sam Flint
- Cinematography: John J. Martin
- Edited by: Ace Herman
- Production company: 20th Century Fox
- Distributed by: 20th Century Fox
- Release date: March 3, 1954
- Running time: 75 minutes
- Country: United States
- Language: English

Racing Blood is a 1954 American drama film directed by Wesley Barry and written by Samuel Roeca. The film stars Bill Williams, Jean Porter, Jimmy Boyd, George Cleveland, John Eldredge and Sam Flint. The film was released on March 3, 1954, by 20th Century-Fox.

== Cast ==
- Bill Williams as Tex
- Jean Porter as Lucille Mitchell
- Jimmy Boyd as David
- George Cleveland as Gramps
- John Eldredge as 'Mitch' Mitchell
- Sam Flint as Doc Nelson
- George Steele as Wee Willie
- Fred Kohler Jr. as John Emerson
- Frankie Darro as Ben
- Bobby Johnson as Mullins
- Fred Kelsey as Smithy
