= Don Juan und Faust =

Don Juan und Faust is a German stage play by Christian Dietrich Grabbe, published in 1828, with music by Albert Lortzing. As its title suggests, it involves a meeting between Faust and Don Juan, with Grabbe intentionally seeking comparisons with Goethe's Faust and Mozart's Don Giovanni. Its 1829 premiere at the Landestheater Detmold made it the only work of Grebbe's to be performed in his own lifetime - contemporaries criticized its pessimism, though it was praised by Kierkegaard in his Either/Or for being "founded on evil" in an extraordinary way.

== Plot ==
Don Juan goes on several amorous adventures in Rome with his servant Leporello. He courts Donna Anna, daughter of the Spanish ambassador, and provokes a duel with her naïve noble fiancé Octavio due to his own selfish desire and lust for genius. He stabs Octavio and then Anna's father after the latter tries to avenge Octavio's death. However, before Don Juan can re-capture Donna Anna, she is abducted by the magician Faust. The devil had appeared to Faust in the form of a knight and bought his soul in return for a promise of supernatural knowledge and power. However, the devil has not made good on the promise but instead inflamed Faust's soul with love of Donna Anna.

Faust thus takes Donna Anna to a castle in the Alps and tries to win her love, but she resists him just as she has already resisted Don Juan and calls on Faust to release her. Don Juan and Leporello attempt to get Anna back, but Faust hurls them both through the air back to Rome. In anger at her steadfastness, Faust kills Anna with his magic but then starts to mourn her and loses all his vitality now she is dead. As she was just another challenge to him, Don Juan sets out on a new conquest, but when he refuses to repent of his sins he is dragged to hell by the devil/knight.

== Adaptations ==
Peter Barnes produced a modernized English-language adaptation for the BBC.

Moritz Moszkowski wrote incidental music, from which Six Airs De Ballet, Opus 56, have been recorded.
