= Rags to Riches (1922 film) =

1922 film

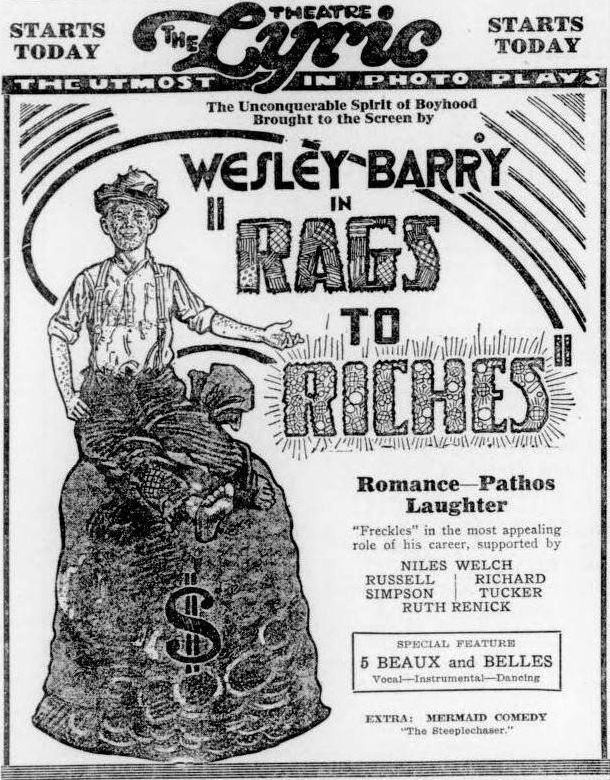
- Newspaper advertisement
- Directed by: Wallace Worsley
- Screenplay by: Walter DeLeon; William Nigh
- Story by: Grace Miller White
- Produced by: Harry Rapf
- Starring: Wesley Barry; Niles Welch; Ruth Renick; Russell Simpson; Minna Redman; Richard Tucker
- Edited by: Clarence Kolster
- Production company: Harry Rapf Productions
- Distributed by: Warner Bros.
- Release date: September 24, 1922
- Running time: 70 minutes
- Country: United States
- Language: Silent (English intertitles)
- Budget: $96,000
- Box office: $447,000

Rags to Riches is a 1922 American silent comedy film directed by Wallace Worsley and written by Walter DeLeon and William Nigh. The film stars Wesley Barry, Niles Welch, Ruth Renick, Russell Simpson, Minna Redman, and Richard Tucker. The film was released by Warner Bros. on September 24, 1922.

== Plot ==
Marmaduke Clyde, a wealthy boy in search of adventure, leaves home to join a gang of crooks. He and Dumbbell strike out by themselves and find work on a farm. Dumbbell falls in love with Mary Wilde, but they incur the wrath of the Purist's League delegation, the sheriff, the Clarkes, detectives hired by Mr Clarke, and the gang of crooks intent on kidnapping Marmaduke, Dumbbell, and Mary all meet up together, Dumbbell reveals himself to be Ralph Connor, Secret Service agent, and turns the gang over to the sheriff.

== Cast ==
- Wesley Barry as Marmaduke Clarke
- Niles Welch as Dumbbell
- Ruth Renick as Mary Warde
- Russell Simpson as The Sheriff
- Minna Redman as Sheriff's wife
- Richard Tucker as Blackwell Clarke
- Eulalie Jensen as Mrs. Blackwell Clarke
- Jane Keckley as Marmaduke's Governess
- Sam Kaufman as Tony
- Dick Sutherland as Bull
- James Quinn as Louis
- Snitz Edwards as Purist League member
- Aileen Manning as Purist League member

== Box office ==
According to Warner Bros records, the film earned $418,000 domestically and $29,000 foreign.

== Preservation ==
With no prints of Rags to Riches located in any film archives, it is considered a lost film. In February 2021, the film was cited by the National Film Preservation Board on their Lost U.S. Silent Feature Films list.
