= Wesley Barry =

American actor (1907–1994)

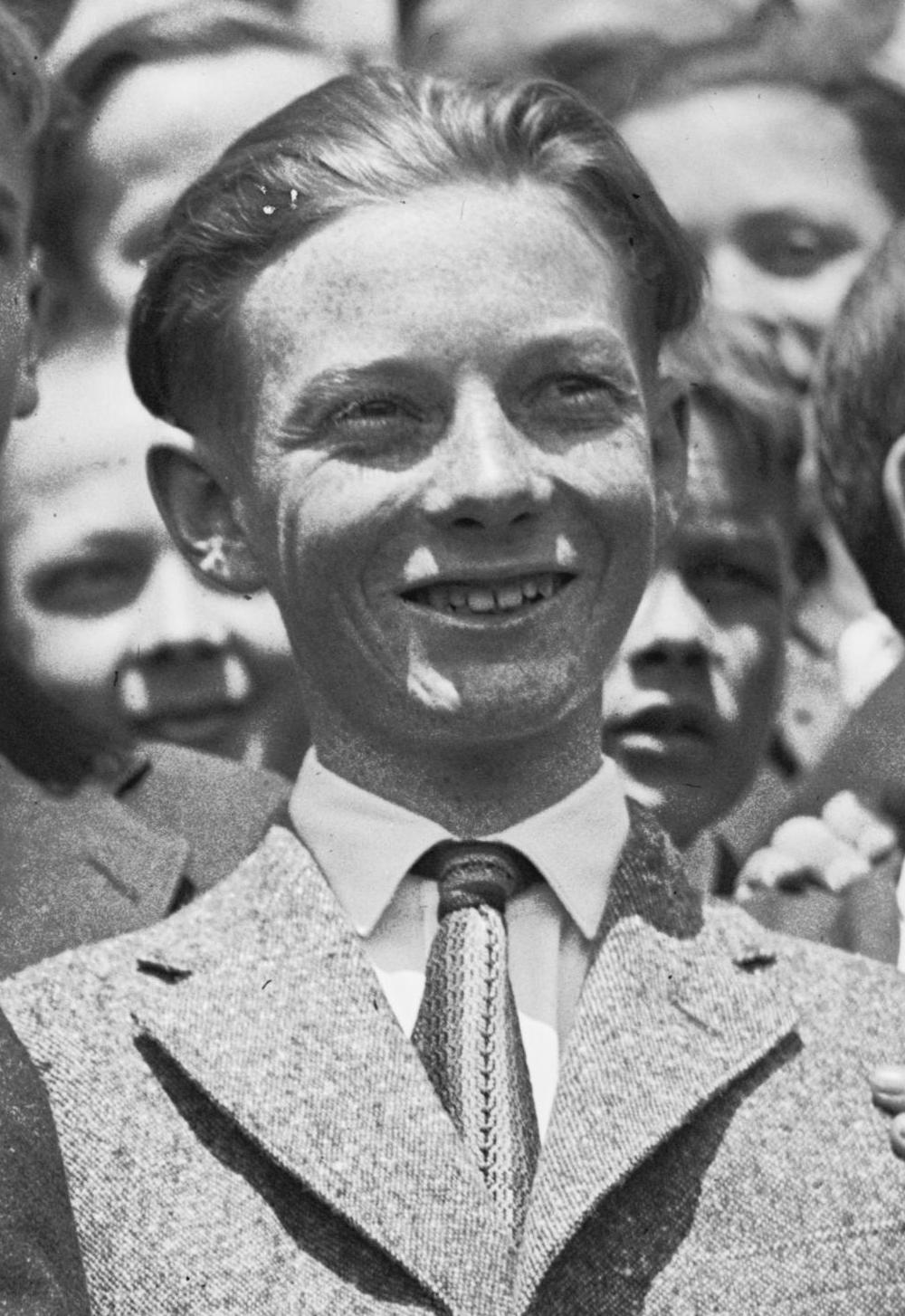
- Barry in 1922
- Born: August 10, 1907; Los Angeles, U.S.
- Died: April 11, 1994 (aged 86); Fresno, California, U.S.
- Occupations: Actor, director, producer
- Years active: 1915–1975

Wesley Barry (August 10, 1907 – April 11, 1994) was an American actor, director, and producer. Barry began his career as a child actor in silent motion pictures and later became a producer and director of both film and television. As a director, he was sometimes billed as Wesley E. Barry.

== Early life and career ==
Born in Los Angeles, Barry was seven years old when a young director—attracted by his facial features—noticed Barry and put him to work at the old Kalem Studios. He was not noted for his freckles until Marshall Neilan cast him in Rebecca of Sunnybrook Farm, with his freckles uncovered (earlier producers had insisted that all subjects cover facial blemishes with grease paint).

Soon, Barry became a star in his own right, and 1920's Dinty put him over with great success. Later screen productions which served him as starring vehicles are School Days, Rags to Riches, Heroes of the Street, and Warner specials. He was eleven years old when he appeared opposite Mary Pickford in Daddy-Long-Legs, and later, in Cecil B. DeMille's Male and Female, opposite Gloria Swanson.

== Later life ==
Barry made some minor film appearances in sound movies through the 1930s, and his last film appearance was in Ladies' Day in 1943. In the 1940s, Barry became a director and producer of television and B-movies, such as The Steel Fist and Racing Blood. During this period, Barry also began a prolific career as an assistant director on many major motion pictures, including Roger Corman's 1967 film The St. Valentine's Day Massacre.

In 1962, Barry directed what has become arguably his most well-known film, The Creation of the Humanoids, a science fiction film starring Don Megowan. It depicts a future society in which robots, known derisively as "Clickers," are persecuted by a fanatical human organisation named "The Order of Flesh and Blood".

Wesley Barry directed his last film, The Jolly Genie, in 1963. He died on April 11, 1994, in Fresno, California.

== Partial filmography ==
- Rebecca of Sunnybrook Farm (1917) (uncredited)
- Amarilly of Clothes-Line Alley (1918) (uncredited)
- How Could You, Jean? (1918)
- The Unpardonable Sin (1919)
- Daddy-Long-Legs (1919) (uncredited)
- A Woman of Pleasure (1919)
- Her Kingdom of Dreams (1919)
- Male and Female (1919)
- Go and Get It (1920)
- The White Circle (1920)
- The County Fair (1920)
- Dinty (1920)
- Bits of Life (1921)
- The Lotus Eater (1921)
- Bob Hampton of Placer (1921)
- School Days (1921)
- Penrod (1922)
- Heroes of the Street (1922)
- The Printer's Devil (1923)
- The Country Kid (1923)
- Pure Grit (1923)
- Battling Bunyan (1924)
- George Washington Jr. (1924)
- The Midshipman (1925)
- The Fighting Cub (1925)
- Wild Geese (1927)
- In Old Kentucky (1927)
- Skyscraper (1928)
- Top Sergeant Mulligan (1928)
- Border Romance (1929)
- The Thoroughbred (1930)
- Sunny Skies (1930)
- Hell-Bent for Frisco (1931)
- Get That Venus (1933)
- Enlighten Thy Daughter (1934)
- Night Life of the Gods (1935)
- Men of the Hour (1935)
- Lady Be Careful (1936)
- The Plough and the Stars (1937)
- Rich Relations (1937)
- Pick a Star (1937)
- The Mexicali Kid (1938)
- Mr. Doodle Kicks Off (1938)
- The Steel Fist (1952)
- Sea Tiger (1952) (produced)
- Trail Blazers (1953) (directed)
- Racing Blood (1954) (directed)
- The Outlaw's Daughter (1954) (directed)
- The Creation of the Humanoids (1962) (directed)
