= Heroes of the Street =

1922 film by William Beaudine

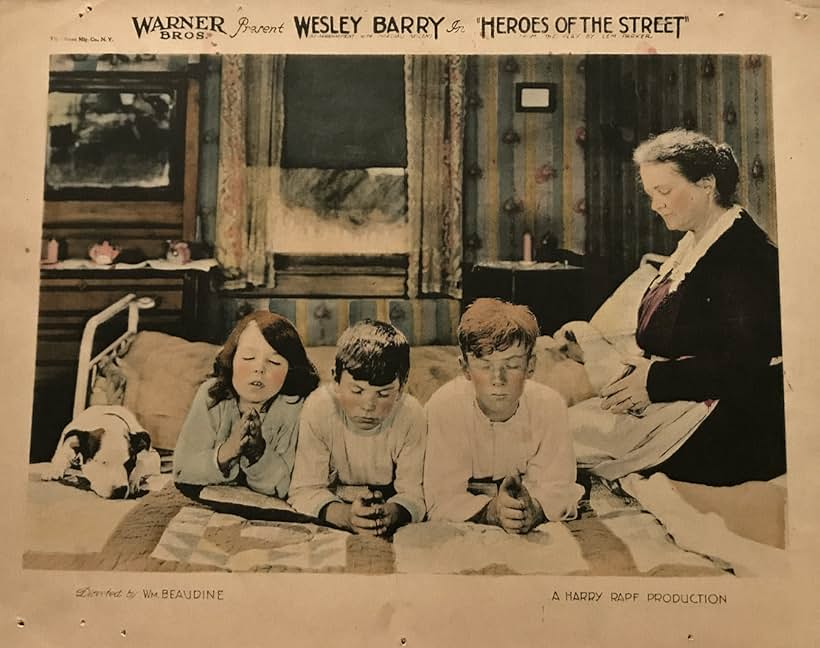
- Directed by: William Beaudine
- Written by: Mildred Considine, Edmund Goulding
- Produced by: Harry Rapf
- Starring: Wesley Barry, Marie Prevost
- Cinematography: Edwin B. DuPar, Max Dupont, Floyd Jackman
- Music by: Leo Edwards (uncredited)
- Distributed by: Warner Bros.
- Release date: December 24, 1922
- Running time: 60 minutes
- Country: United States
- Language: Silent (English intertitles)
- Budget: $110,000
- Box office: $396,000

Heroes of the Street is a 1922 American silent crime drama film directed by William Beaudine. It stars child actor Wesley Barry, Marie Prevost, and Jack Mulhall. This film survives in the George Eastman House.

== Plot ==
When a smart aleck street kid's father, a policeman, is killed in the line of duty, the boy turns over a new leaf and goes to work to support his mother, brothers and sisters. He gets a job as an usher in a theater, but really wants to become a policeman to avenge the death of his father. He soon finds himself involved in a fake kidnapping, real gangsters and a tip on the identity of the man who killed his dad.

== Cast ==
- Wesley Barry as Mickey Callahan
- Marie Prevost as Betty Benton
- Jack Mulhall as Howard Lane
- Philo McCullough as Shadow
- Will Walling as Officer Mike Callahan
- Aggie Herring as Mrs. Callahan
- Wilfred Lucas
- Wedgwood Nowell
- Philip Ford
- Peaches Jackson
- William Beaudine Jr.
- Joe Butterworth
- Cameo the Dog as Dog

== Box office ==
According to Warner Bros records, the film earned $366,000 domestically and $30,000 foreign.
