= Erich Zimmermann (tenor) =

German operatic tenor (1892–1968)

Erich Zimmermann (29 November 1892, in Meißen, Germany – 24 February 1968, in Berlin) was a German operatic tenor. He was primarily known for his abilities in buffo roles. During his initial training he worked as painter at the Meißen porcelain factory, before moving to study voice in Dresden, where he made his debut in 1918.

== Roles ==
He appeared in a number of Wagner roles at Bayreuth including as Mime in Der Ring des Nibelungen and David in Die Meistersinger von Nürnberg from 1925 to 1944.
