= Spieloper =

Opera genre

Spieloper (German: [ˈʃpiːlʔoːpɐ], 'opera play') is a light opera genre, developed from Singspiel. Works typical of the genre include those by Albert Lortzing, such as Zar und Zimmermann, and Otto Nicolai's The Merry Wives of Windsor. A key difference between Spieloper and Singspiel on the one hand, and opera buffa on the other, is that the two former genres contain spoken dialogues instead of recitatives, which is why Conradin Kreutzer's Das Nachtlager in Granada and Friedrich von Flotow's Martha do not belong to this genre.

Technically, a Spieloper is an opera with a comic plot and light, pleasant music, differentiating it from more serious opera. Similarly, there are special role types such as Spieltenor or Spielbass for singers with lighter voices and the ability to act in comedies.

The Spieloper was also inspired by the French opéra comique of the late 18th century, a narrowly defined form of opera. The boundaries between Spieloper and a form of German drama "Posse mit Gesang" (melodramatic comedy with musical interludes) and operetta are not well distinguished.

== Sources ==
- Warrack, John and West, Ewan (1992), The Oxford Dictionary of Opera, 782 pages, ISBN 0-19-869164-5
- Some of the material in this article is from the German Wikipedia article
