= Josef Derossi =

Austrian actor

- Born: 6 August 1768
- Died: 18 December 1841 (aged 73)

Josef or Joseph Derossi or de Rossi (6 August 1768 – 18 December 1841) was an Austrian actor. He is notable as the first manager of the Düsseldorfer Schauspielhaus in Düsseldorf from 1818 onwards.

== Life ==
He began his career in 1786 playing lover roles and stock character roles.
