= Christian Dietrich Grabbe =

German playwright (1801–1836)

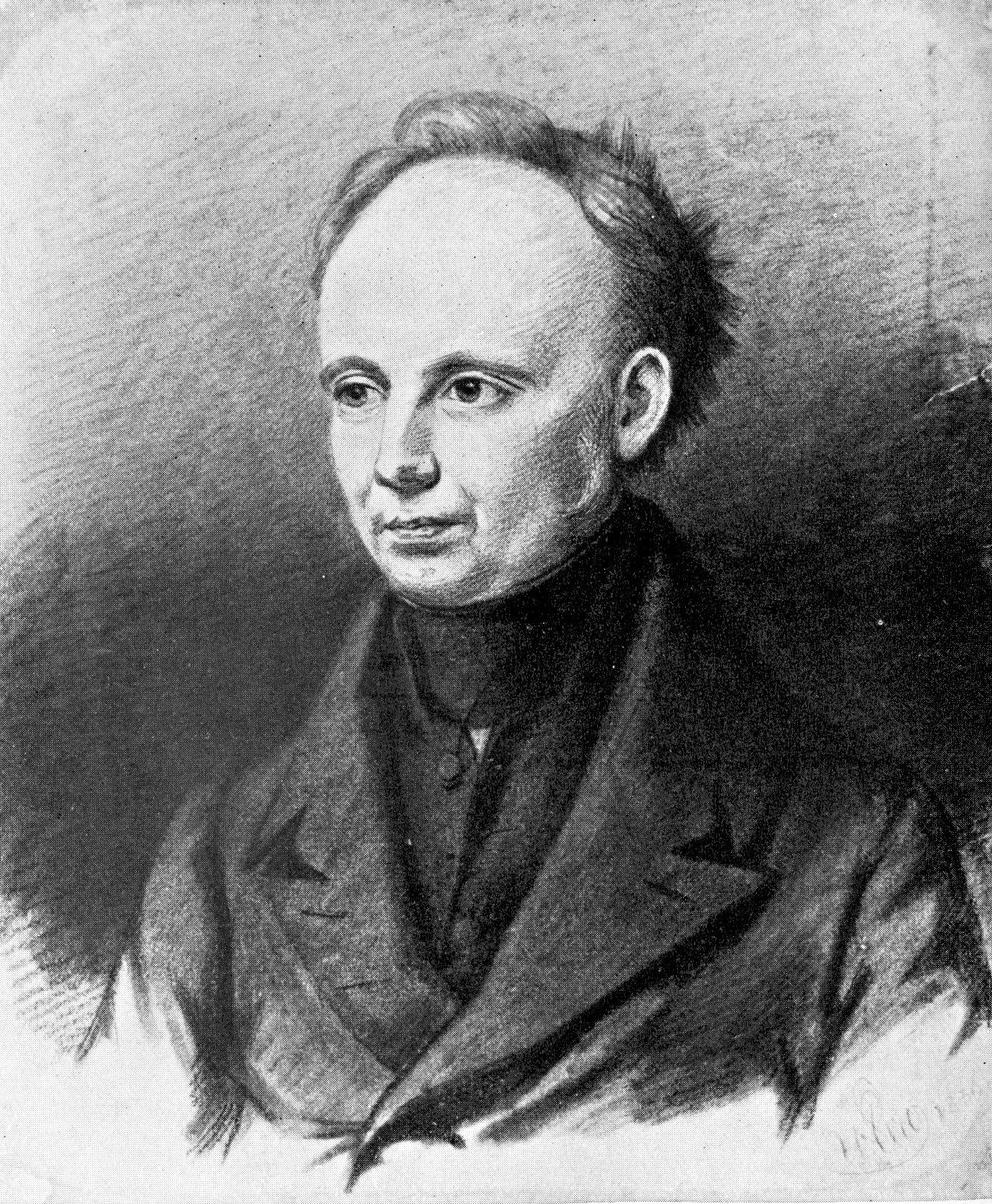
- Lithograph, 1836
- Born: 11 December 1801; Detmold, Principality of Lippe
- Died: 12 September 1836 (aged 34); Detmold
- Occupation: Playwright
- Writing career
- Notable works: Scherz, Satire, Ironie und tiefere Bedeutung, Don Juan und Faust, Die Hohenstauffen, Die Hermannsschlacht

Christian Dietrich Grabbe (11 December 1801 – 12 September 1836) was a German dramatist of the Vormärz era. He wrote many historical plays conceiving a disillusioned and pessimistic world view, with some shrill scenes. Heinrich Heine saw him as one of Germany's foremost dramatists, calling him "a drunken Shakespeare" and Sigmund Freud described Grabbe as "an original and rather peculiar poet."

== Life ==
Born in Detmold, the son of a prison officer, he began to write plays in the age of sixteen, while attending the Gymnasium. A scholarship awarded by Princess Pauline enabled him to study law at the universities of Leipzig and Berlin, where he became acquainted with Heinrich Heine. After graduating in 1823, he unsuccessfully applied as a theatre director.

Grabbe returned to Detmold, he passed the final Staatsexamen and tried to find an employment as a legal officer, though also to no avail. Finally in 1826 he was appointed to act as a military legal advisor, initially without remuneration. From 1831 he increasingly suffered from alcoholism. After his fiancée turned away from him, he married his beloved Louise Christina Clostermeier in 1833, but the marriage quickly turned out to be unhappy. The next year Grabbe quit and left Detmold for Frankfurt, where he also fell out with his publisher.

He proceeded to Düsseldorf, where he temporarily worked at the Altes Theater with Karl Leberecht Immermann. Grabbe returned to Detmold in 1836 as a broken man, his wife filed for divorce. He died from general paresis in the same year.

== Legacy ==
With Georg Büchner, Grabbe was one of the principal German dramatists of his time. His debut Herzog Theodor von Gothland overtaxed contemporary critics by its all-pervasive nihilism. Influenced by Shakespeare and the Sturm und Drang movement, his plays were very ambitious, with crowd scenes and rapid scene changes that challenged the technical capacity of the theaters of the time. He resolved the strict forms of the classical drama in a loose series of scenes that were a precursor of the realist drama. His plays Napoleon oder Die hundert Tage or Hannibal reveal a realistic, heterogeneous concept of history.

After his death, he was at first forgotten, but his work was rediscovered by the Naturalist and Expressionist dramatists. He was honored by the Nazis as a great national poet, based on occasional antisemitic statements (particularly in Aschenbrödel), and on his nationalistic portrayal of German history, like Die Hermannsschlacht on the Battle of the Teutoburg Forest. In the 1930s, numerous streets were named after him.

The city of Detmold awards the Christian-Dietrich-Grabbe Prize for new dramatic literature since 1994 in association with the Grabbe-Gesellschaft literary society and the Landesverband Lippe municipal association.

== Works ==
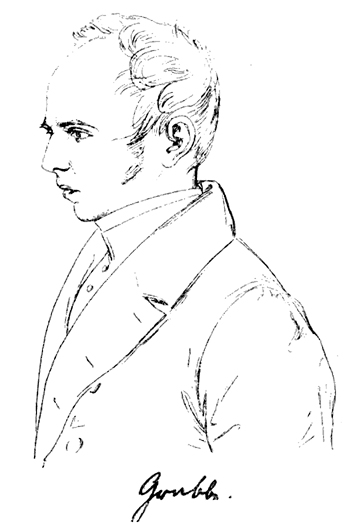
Grabbe, sketch by Theodor Hildebrandt, 1832

- Herzog Theodor von Gothland, tragedy (1822); first performance 1892, Vienna
- Scherz, Satire, Ironie und tiefere Bedeutung, comedy, (1822/27); first performance 1907, Munich
- Nannette und Maria, melodrama (1823); first performance 1914, Kettwig (Essen)
- Marius und Sulla, fragment (1823–27); first performance 1936, Detmold
- Über die Shakspearo-Manie, theatre mémoire (1827)
- Don Juan und Faust, tragedy (1828), first performance 1829, Detmold
- Kaiser Friedrich Barbarossa, drama (1829), part I of the Hohenstaufen cycle; first performance 1875, Schwerin
- Kaiser Heinrich VI., drama (1829), part II of the Hohenstaufen cycle; first performance 1875, Schwerin
- Etwas über den Briefwechsel zwischen Schiller und Goethe, literary mémoire (1830); partly published in 1835
- Napoleon oder Die hundert Tage, drama (1831); first performance 1895, Frankfurt
- Kosciuzko, drama fragment (1835); first performance 1941, Gelsenkirchen
- Aschenbrödel, comedy (1829/35); first performance 1937, Detmold
- Hannibal, tragedy (1835); first performance 1918, Munich
- Der Cid, libretto of a planned opera by Norbert Burgmüller (1835); first performance 2002, Isen
- Die Hermannsschlacht, drama (1835–36); first performance 1936, Detmold
