= 71st Locarno Film Festival =

Film festival in Locarno, Switzerland

- Festival official poster
- Opening film: Liberty directed by Leo McCarey
- Closing film: I Feel Good by Benoît Delépine and Gustave KervernI
- Location: Locarno, Switzerland
- Founded: 1946
- Awards: Golden Leopard
- Hosted by: Associazione Festival del film Locarno
- Artistic director: Carlo Chatrian
- Festival date: Opening: 1 August 2018; Closing: 11 August 2018
- Website: Locarno Film Festival

Locarno Film Festival
- 72nd 71st

The 71st Locarno Film Festival was held from 1 to 11 August 2018 in Locarno, Switzerland. The opening film of the festival was the silent film, Liberty (1929) directed by Leo McCarey. The closing film of the festival was Benoît Delépine and Gustave Kervern's film I Feel Good.

Director Jia Zhang-ke was president of the jury. Ethan Hawke attended the festival and received an excellence award. Select films from the Cinema of the Present competition were available for free online as part of the festival. It was artistic director Carlo Chatrian's last year at the festival before moving on to run Berlinale.

The jury awarded the Golden Leopard, the festival's highest prize, to A Land Imagined directed by Yeo Siew Hua.

== Jury ==
=== International Competition Jury ===
- Jury President: Jia Zhang-ke, Filmmaker (China)
- Emmanuel Carrère, Writer (France)
- Sean Baker, Filmmaker (United States of America)
- Tizza Covi, Filmmaker (Italy/Austria)
- Isabella Ragonese, Actress (Italy)

=== Films of the Present Jury (Concorso Cineasti del presente) ===
- President: Andrei Ujică, Filmmaker (Romania)
- Ben Rivers, Filmmaker (United Kingdom)
- Lætitia Dosch, Actress (Switzerland/France)

=== Leopards of Tomorrow Jury (Pardi di Domani) ===
- Jury President: Yann Gonzalez, Filmmaker (France)
- Deepak Rauniyar, Filmmaker (Nepal)
- Marta Mateus, Filmmaker (Portugal)

=== The Jury of Signs of Life ===
- Emilie Bujès, Festival Director (Switzerland)
- Josh Siegel, Curator (United States of America)
- Tiziana Finzi, Curator (Italy)

=== First Feature Jury ===
- Funa Maduka, Creative and Acquisitions Executive (United States of America)
- Susan Vahabzadeh, Film Critic (Germany)
- Kieron Corless, Film Critic (United Kingdom)

== Official Sections ==
The following films were screened in these sections:

=== Piazza Grande ===
The following films were selected to be screened at the Piazza Grande:

Piazza Grande
Title	Director(s)	Year	Production Country
Blackkklansman	Spike Lee	2018	USA
Blaze	Ethan Hawke	2018	USA
Coincoin Et Les Z'Inhumains. E01-02	Bruno Dumont	2018	France
I Feel Good	Benoît Delépine, Gustave Kervern	2018	France
In The Cut	Jane Campion	2003	Great Britain
Le Vent Tourne	Bettina Oberli	2018	Switzerland
Les Beaux Esprits	Vianney Lebasque	2018	France
Liberty	Leo McCarey	1929	USA
L'Ordre Des Médecins	David Roux	2018	France
The Guest	Duccio Chiarini	2018	Italia
Maynila: Sa Mga Kuko Ng Liwanag	Lino Brocka	1975	Philippines
Pájaros De Verano	Cristina Gallego, Ciro Guerra	2018	Colombia
Ruben Brandt, Collector	Milorad Krstić	2018	Hungary
Se7En	David Fincher	1995	USA
Searching	Aneesh Chaganty	2018	USA
The Equalizer 2	Antoine Fuqua	2018	USA
Un Nemico Che Ti Vuole Bene	Denis Rabaglia	2018	Italia
Was Uns Nicht Umbringt	Sandra Nettelbeck	2018	Germany

Piazza Grande: Prefestival

Piazza Grande: Prefestival
Title	Director(s)	Year	Production Country
Grease	Randal Kleiser	1978	USA

=== International Competition ===
The International Competition is the main section of the Locarno Film Festival, featuring new works in competition for the Golden Leopard. Highlighted title indicates Golden Leopard winner:

International Competition
Title	English title	Director(s)	Production Country
A Family Tour	A Family Tour	Liang Ying	Taiwan
A Land Imagined		Siew Hua Yeo	Singapore
Alice T.		Radu Muntean	Romania
Diane		Kent Jones	USA
Gangbyun Hotel	Hotel by the River	Sangsoo Hong	South Korea
Genèse		Philippe Lesage	Canada
Glaubenberg		Thomas Imbach	Switzerland
La flor		Mariano Llinás	Argentina
M		Yolande Zauberman	France
Menocchio		Alberto Fasulo	Italia
Ray & Liz	Ray & Liz	Richard Billingham	Great Britain
Sibel		Guillaume Giovanetti, Çağla Zencirci	France
Tarde Para Morir Joven	Too Late to Die Young	Dominga Sotomayor	Chile
Wintermärchen		Jan Bonny	Germany
Yara		Abbas Fahdel	Lebanon

=== Filmmakers of the Present ===
The Concorso Cineasti del Presente, also known as the Filmmakers of the Present Competition, showcases first and second feature films from emerging filmmakers.

Filmmakers of the Present

Filmmakers of the Present
Title	Director(s)	Production Country
Alles Ist Gut	Eva Trobisch	Germany
Ceux Qui Travaillent	Antoine Russbach	Switzerland
Chaos	Sara Fattahi	Austria
Closing Time	Nicole Vögele	Switzerland
Dead Horse Nebula	Tarık Aktaş	Türkiye
Familia Sumergida	María Alché	Argentina
Fausto	Andrea Bussmann	Mexico
Hatzlila	Yona Rozenkier	Israel
Jiao Qu De Niao	Sheng Qiu	China
Likemeback	Leonardo Guerra Seràgnoli	Italia
L'Époque	Matthieu Bareyre	France
Siyabonga	Joshua Magor	South Africa
Sophia Antipolis	Virgil Vernier	France
Tegnap	Bálint Kenyeres	Hungary
Temporada	André Novais Oliveira	Brazil
Trote	Xacio Baño	Spain

=== Leopards of Tomorrow ===
Leopards of Tomorrow International Competition

Leopards of Tomorrow International Competition
Title	Director(s)	Year	Production Country
3 Años Depois	Marco Amaral	2018	Portugal
A Cold Summer Night	Yash Sawant	2018	India
D'Un Château L'Autre	Emmanuel Marre	2018	Belgium
El Laberinto	Laura Huertas Millán	2018	France
Frase D'Arme	Federico Di Corato	2018	Italia
Fuck You	Anette Sidor	2018	Sweden
Grbavica	Manel Raga Raga	2018	Portugal
Heart Of Hunger	Bernardo Zanotta	2018	Netherlands
Hi I Need To Be Loved	Marnie Ellen Hertzler	2018	USA
Je Sors Acheter Des Cigarettes	Osman Cerfon	2018	France
Kaukazas	Laurynas Bareiša	2018	Lithuania
La Cartographe	Nathan Douglas	2018	Canada
La Máxima Longitud De Un Puente	Simón Vélez	2018	Colombia
Last Year When The Train Passed By	Pang-chuan Huang	2018	France
Lunar-Orbit Rendezvous	Mélanie Charbonneau	2018	Canada
Malo Se Sjećam Tog Dana	Leon Lučev	2018	Croatia
My Expanded View	Corey Hughes	2018	USA
Out	Alon Sahar	2018	Israel
Patul Lui Procust	Andrian Împărățel	2018	Romania
Rekonstrukce	Jiří Havlíček, Ondřej Novák	2017	Czech Republic
Reneepoptosis	Renee Zhan	2018	USA
Saras Intime Betroelser	Emilie Blichfeldt	2018	Norway
Sashleli	Davit Pirtskhalava	2018	Georgia
Smert Menya	Mikhail Maksimov	2018	Russia
The Silence Of The Dying Fish	Vasilis Kekatos	2018	Greece
Tourneur	Yalda Afsah	2018	Germany
Violeta + Guillermo	Óscar Vincentelli	2018	Spain
Words, Planets	Laida Lertxundi	2018	USA
Zhi Shuo Yi Ci	Hui Chen	2018	China

Leopards of Tomorrow National Competition

Leopards of Tomorrow National Competition
Title	Director(s)	Production Country
Abigaïl	Magdalena Froger	Switzerland
Circuit	Delia Hess	Switzerland
Eva	Xheni Alushi	Switzerland
Fait Divers	Léon Yersin	Switzerland
Hier	Loïc Kreyden	Switzerland
Ici Le Chemin Des Ânes	Lou Rambert Preiss	Switzerland
In Loving Memory Of The Future	Laurence Favre, Laurence Favre	Switzerland
La Source	Yatoni Roy Cantu	Switzerland
Le Sens De La Marche	Jela Hasler	Switzerland
Les Îles De Brissogne	Juliette Riccaboni	Switzerland
Los Que Desean	Elena López Riera	Switzerland
Monte Amiata	Tommaso Donati	Switzerland
Selfies	Claudius Gentinetta	Switzerland

=== Out of Competition ===
Out of Competition

Out of Competition
Title	Director(s)	Year	Production Country
Amur Senza Fin	Christoph Schaub	2018	Switzerland
De Chaque Instant	Nicolas Philibert	2018	France
Insulaire	Stéphane Goël	2018	Switzerland
Mudar La Piel	Cristóbal Fernández, Ana Schulz	2018	Spain
My Home, In Libya	Martina Melilli	2018	Italia
Narcissister Organ Player	Narcissister	2017	USA
Ora E Sempre Riprendiamoci La Vita	Silvano Agosti	2018	Italia
Rūgštus Miškas	Rugile Barzdziukaite	2018	Lithuania
Sembra Mio Figlio	Costanza Quatriglio	2018	Italia
The Sentence	Rudy Valdez	2018	USA
Walking On Water	Andrey M. Paounov	2018	USA

Out of Competition: Shorts

Out of Competition: Shorts
Title	Director(s)	Production Country
Diversion	Mathieu Mégemont	France
La Belle Affaire	Constance Meyer	France
Tomatic	Christophe Saber	France
À Nous Deux!	Marie Loustalot	France

=== Open Doors ===
Open Doors Programmi Special

Open Doors Programmi Special
Title	Director(s)	Production Country
Laila At The Bridge	Elizabeth Mirzaei, Gulistan Mirzaei	Canada

Open Doors Screenings

Open Doors Screenings
English title	Title	Director(s)	Year	Production Country
Demons in Paradise		Jude Ratnam	2017	Sri Lanka
Live from Dhaka		Abdullah Mohammad Saad	2016	Bangladesh
Honeygiver Among the Dogs	Munmo Tashi Khyidron	Dechen Roder	2016	Bhutan
White Sun	Seto Surya	Deepak Rauniyar	2016	Nepal
The Road to Mandalay		Midi Z	2016	Taiwan
Thundenek		Asoka Handagama, Vimukthi Jayasundara, Prasanna Vithanage	2018	Sri Lanka
Zinda Bhaag		Meenu Gaur, Farjad Nabi	2013	Pakistan

Open Doors Shorts

Open Doors Shorts
Title	Director(s)	Year	Production Country
298-C	Nida Mehboob	2018	Pakistan
A Song Of Silence	Kelzang Dorjee	2016	Bhutan
Dadyaa: The Woodpeckers Of Rotha	Bibhusan Basnet, Pooja Gurung	2016	Nepal
Death Of A Reader	Mahde Hasan	2017	Bangladesh
Dia	Hamza Bangash	2018	Pakistan
Silver Bangles	Roshan Bikram Thakuri	2017	Nepal
Sorkhe Tirah	Diana Saqeb	2017	Afghanistan
Supermonk	Shenang Gyamjo Tamang	2018	Nepal
The Last Post Office	Aung Rakhine	2018	Bangladesh
The Open Door	Jamyang Jamtsho Wangchuk	2018	Bhutan
Tradition	Lanka Bandaranayake	2016	Sri Lanka
Witt Yone	WeRa	2016	Myanmar
Yar-Thi Moe	Aung Phyoe	2016	Myanmar

=== Signs of Life ===
Title	Director(s)	Year	Production Country
A Room With A Coconut View	Tulapop Saenjaroen	2018	Thailand
Communion Los Angeles	Adam R. Levine, Peter Bo Rappmund	2018	USA
Como Fernando Pessoa Salvou Portugal	Eugène Green	2018	Portugal
Dulcinea	Luca Ferri	2018	Italia
Gulyabani	Gürcan Keltek	2018	Netherlands
Hai Shang Cheng Shi	Zi Lin	2018	China
Jing Li De Ren	Hu Bo	2017	China
La Casa De Julio Iglesias	Natalia Marín	2018	Spain
Le Discours D'Acceptation Glorieux De Nicolas Chauvin	Benjamin Crotty	2018	France
Sedução Da Carne	Júlio Bressane	2018	Brazil
Sobre Tudo Sobre Nada	Dídio Pestana	2018	Portugal
The Grand Bizarre	Jodie Mack	2018	USA
Tirss, Rihlat Alsoo'Oud Ila Almar'I	Ghassan Halwani	2018	Lebanon
Veslemøy's Song	Sofia Bohdanowicz	2018	Canada

=== History (s) of Cinema ===
The festival's Histoire(s) du Cinema section showcases films deemed significant to the evolution of cinema. Films by the festival's career award winners are presented in this section

History (s) of Cinema: Excellence Award Ethan Hawke
Original title	English title	Director(s)	Year	Production country
Boyhood		Richard Linklater	2014	USA
Dead Poets Society		Peter Weir	1989	USA
First Reformed		Paul Schrader	2017	USA
Seymour: An Introduction		Ethan Hawke	2014	USA
Leopard Club Award Meg Ryan
Sleepless in Seattle		Nora Ephron	1993	USA
Pardo D'onore Manor Bruno Dumont
Coincoin Et Les Z'Inhumains. E03-04	Coincoin and the Extra-Humans	Bruno Dumont	2018	France
Jeannette, L'Enfance De Jeanne D'Arc	Jeannette: The Childhood of Joan of Arc	Bruno Dumont	2017	France
La Vie De Jésus	The Life of Jesus	Bruno Dumont	1997	France
L'Humanité	Humanité	Bruno Dumont	1999	France
Pierre Rissient Tribute
Cinq Et La Peau	Five and the Skin	Pierre Rissient	1982	France
Da Xiang Xi Di Er Zuo	An Elephant Sitting Still	Hu Bo	2018	China
Ze Soboty Na Neděli	From Saturday to Sunday	Gustav Machatý	1931	Czech Republic
Rezzonico Ted Hope Prize
American Splendor		Robert Pulcini, Shari Springer Berman	2003	USA
Happiness		Todd Solondz	1998	USA
Manchester by the Sea		Kenneth Lonergan	2016	USA
The Ice Storm		Ang Lee	1997	USA
Special Screenings
Mitt Hem Är Copacabana	My Home Is Copacabana	Arne Sucksdorff	1965	Sweden
Vip, Mio Fratello Superuomo	VIP, My Super Man Brother	Bruno Bozzetto	1968	Italy
Être Et Avoir	To Be and To Have	Nicolas Philibert	2002	France
Swiss Cinema Rediscovered
Quatre D'Entre Elles	Four of Them	Claude Champion, Francis Reusser, Jacques Sandoz, Yves Yersin	1968	Switzerland
Seuls	Souls	Francis Reusser	1981	Switzerland
Vive La Mort	Long Live Death	Francis Reusser	1969	Switzerland
Tribute Claude Lanzmann
Shoah		Claude Lanzmann	1985	France
Tribute Paolo And Vittorio Taviani
Buongiorno Babilonia	Good Morning, Babylon	Vittorio Taviani, Paolo Taviani	1987	Italy
Tribute Wolf-Eckart Bühler
Der Havarist	The Shipwrecker	Wolf-Eckart Bühler	1984	Germany
Leuchtturm Des Chaos	Chaos Lighthouse	Manfred Blank, Wolf-Eckart Bühler	1983	Germany
Vision Award Ticinomoda Kyle Cooper
Spider-Man		Sam Raimi	2002	USA
The New World		Terrence Malick	2005	USA
The Secret Life of Walter Mitty		Ben Stiller	2013	USA

=== Retrospective ===
Retrospective Leo McCarey: Materials
Title	Director(s)	Year	Production country
Outside the Law	Tod Browning	1920	USA
Screen Directors Playhouse – Meet the Governor	Leo McCarey	1955	USA
Screen Directors Playhouse – Tom and Jerry	Leo McCarey	1955	USA
You Can Change the World	Leo McCarey	1950	USA
Leo McCarey: Feature Films
An Affair to Remember	Leo McCarey	1957	USA
Belle of the Nineties	Leo McCarey	1934	USA
Duck Soup	Leo McCarey	1933	USA
Going My Way	Leo McCarey	1944	USA
Good Sam – Long Version	Leo McCarey	1948	USA
Good Sam	Leo McCarey	1948	USA
Indiscreet	Leo McCarey	1931	USA
Let's Go Native	Leo McCarey	1930	USA
Love Affair	Leo McCarey	1939	USA
Make Way for Tomorrow	Leo McCarey	1937	USA
My Favorite Wife	Garson Kanin	1940	USA
My Son John	Leo McCarey	1952	USA
Once Upon a Honeymoon	Leo McCarey	1942	USA
Part Time Wife	Leo McCarey	1930	USA
Rally Round the Flag, Boys!	Leo McCarey	1958	USA
Ruggles of Red Gap	Leo McCarey	1935	USA
Satan Never Sleeps	Leo McCarey	1962	USA
Six of a Kind	Leo McCarey	1934	USA
The Awful Truth	Leo McCarey	1937	USA
The Bells of St. Mary's	Leo McCarey	1945	USA
The Cowboy and the Lady	H. C. Potter	1938	USA
The Kid from Spain	Leo McCarey	1932	USA
The Milky Way	Leo McCarey	1936	USA
The Sophomore	Leo McCarey	1929	USA
Wild Company	Leo McCarey	1930	USA
Leo McCarey: Shorts
A Pair of Tights	Hal Yates	1928	USA
A Ten-Minute Egg	Leo McCarey	1924	USA
All Wet	Leo McCarey	1924	USA
Angora Love	Lewis R. Foster	1929	USA
Assistant Wives	James Parrott	1927	USA
Bacon Grabbers	Lewis R. Foster	1929	USA
Bad Boy	Leo McCarey	1925	USA
Be Your Age	Leo McCarey	1926	USA
Big Business	James W. Horne	1929	USA
Big Red Riding Hood	Leo McCarey	1925	USA
Bromo and Juliet	Leo McCarey	1926	USA
Call of the Cuckoo	Clyde Bruckman	1927	USA
Came the Dawn	Arch Heath	1928	USA
Charley My Boy!	Leo McCarey	1926	USA
Crazy like a Fox	Leo McCarey	1926	USA
Dog Shy	Leo McCarey	1926	USA
Don't Tell Everything	Leo McCarey	1927	USA
Double Whoopee	Lewis R. Foster	1929	USA
Duck Soup	Fred Guiol	1927	USA
Dumb Daddies	Hal Yates	1928	USA
Early to Bed	Emmett J. Flynn	1928	USA
Eve's Love Letters	Leo McCarey	1927	USA
Feed ’em and Weep	Fred Guiol	1928	USA
Fighting Fluid	Leo McCarey	1925	USA
Flaming Fathers	Stan Laurel, Leo McCarey	1927	USA
From Soup to Nuts	Edgar Kennedy	1928	USA
Going Ga-Ga	James W. Horne	1929	USA
Habeas Corpus	Leo McCarey, James Parrott	1928	USA
Hello Baby!	Leo McCarey	1925	USA
His Wooden Wedding	Leo McCarey	1925	USA
Innocent Husbands	Leo McCarey	1925	USA
Is Marriage The Bunk?	Leo McCarey	1925	USA
Isn't Life Terrible?	Leo McCarey	1925	USA
Jeffries Jr.	Leo McCarey	1924	USA
Jewish Prudence	Leo McCarey	1927	USA
Leave 'Em Laughing	Clyde Bruckman	1928	USA
Liberty	Leo McCarey	1929	USA
Limousine Love	Fred Guiol	1928	USA
Long Fliv The King	Leo McCarey	1926	USA
Looking For Sally	Leo McCarey	1925	USA
Love 'Em And Feed 'Em	Clyde Bruckman	1927	USA
Mama Behave	Leo McCarey	1926	USA
Men O'War	Lewis R. Foster	1929	USA
Mighty Like a Moose	Leo McCarey	1926	USA
Movie Night	Lewis R. Foster	1929	USA
Mum's the Word	Leo McCarey	1926	USA
No Father to Guide Him	Leo McCarey	1925	USA
Outdoor Pajamas	Leo McCarey	1924	USA
Pass the Gravy	Fred Guiol	1928	USA
Perfect Day	James Parrott	1929	USA
Publicity Pays	Leo McCarey	1924	USA
Putting Pants on Philip	Clyde Bruckman	1927	USA
Should Husbands be Watched?	Leo McCarey	1925	USA
Should Married Men Go Home?	James Parrott	1928	USA
Should Men Walk Home?	Leo McCarey	1927	USA
Should Second Husbands Come First?	Leo McCarey	1927	USA
Sittin’ Pretty	Leo McCarey	1924	USA
Sugar Daddies	Fred Guiol	1927	USA
Tell 'Em Nothing	Leo McCarey	1926	USA
That's My Wife	Lloyd French	1929	USA
The Battle Of The Century	Clyde Bruckman	1927	USA
The Boy Friend	Fred Guiol	1928	USA
The Caretaker's Daughter	Leo McCarey	1925	USA
The Finishing Touch	Clyde Bruckman	1928	USA
The Hoose-Gow	James Parrott	1929	USA
The Poor Fish	Leo McCarey	1924	USA
The Rat's Knuckles	Leo McCarey	1925	USA
The Second 100 Years	Fred Guiol	1927	USA
The Uneasy Three	Leo McCarey	1925	USA
Their Purple Moment	James Parrott	1928	USA
They Go Boom!	James Parrott	1929	USA
Two Tars	James Parrott	1928	USA
Us	James Parrott	1927	USA
We Faw Down	Leo McCarey	1928	USA
What Price Goofy?	Leo McCarey	1925	USA
Why Girls Say No	Leo McCarey	1927	USA
Wrong Again	Leo McCarey	1929	USA
Young Oldfield	Leo McCarey	1924	USA
You're Darn Tootin’	Edgar Kennedy	1928	USA

== Independent Sections ==
=== Critics Week ===
The Semaine de la Critique is an independent section, created in 1990 by the Swiss Association of Film Journalists in partnership with the Locarno Film Festival.

Title	Director(s)	Year	Production Country
#Female Pleasure	Barbara Miller	2018	Switzerland
Dani Ludila	Damian Nenadić	2018	Croatia
Könnyű Leckék	Dorottya Zurbó	2018	Hungary
La Huella De Tara	Georgina Barreiro	2018	Argentina
Le Temps Des Forêts	François-Xavier Drouet	2018	France
L'Apollon De Gaza	Nicolas Wadimoff	2018	Switzerland
Zanani Ba Gushvarehaye Baruti	Reza Farahmand	2017	Iran

=== Swiss Panorama ===
Swiss Panorama
Title	Director(s)	Year	Production Country
Blue My Mind	Lisa Brühlmann	2017	Switzerland
Chris the Swiss	Anja Kofmel	2018	Switzerland
Die Vierte Gewalt	Dieter Fahrer	2018	Switzerland
Eldorado	Markus Imhoof	2018	Switzerland
Fortuna	Germinal Roaux	2018	Switzerland
Genesis 2.0	Maxim Arbugaev, Christian Frei	2018	Switzerland
Les Dames	Stéphanie Chuat, Véronique Reymond	2018	Switzerland
Mario	Marcel Gisler	2018	Switzerland
Where Are You, João Gilberto?	Georges Gachot	2018	Switzerland
À L'École Des Philosophes	Fernand Melgar	2018	Switzerland

== Other Sections ==
=== Special Events ===
Special Event
Title	Director(s)	Production Country
Mario Botta. Oltre Lo Spazio	Loretta Dalpozzo, Michèle Volontè	Switzerland

== Official Awards ==
=== International Competition (Concorso Internazionale) ===
- Pardo d'oro: A Land Imagined by Yeo Siew Hua, Singapore / France / The Netherlands
- Premio speciale della giuria: M by Yolande Zauberman, France
- Pardo per la miglior regia: Tarde Para Morir Joven by Dominga Sotomayor, Chile / Brazil / Argentina / The Netherlands / Qatar
- Pardo per la miglior interpretazione femminile: Andra Guți for ALICE T. by Radu Muntean, Romania / France / Sweden
- Pardo per la miglior interpretazione maschile: Gi Ju-bong for Gangbyeon Hotel (Hotel by the River) by Hong Sang-soo, South Korea
- Special Mention: Ray & Liz by Richard Billingham, United Kingdom

=== Filmmakers of the Present Competition (Concorso Cineasti del presente) ===
- Pardo d'oro Cineasti del presente: Chaos by Sara Fattahi, Austria / Syria / Lebanon / Qatar
- Premio per il miglior regista emergente – Città e Regione di Locarno: Dead Horse Nebula by Tarık Aktaş, Turkey
- Premio speciale della giuria Ciné+ Cineasti del presente: Closing Time by Nicole Vögele, Switzerland / Germany
- Special Mention: Fausto by Andrea Bussmann, Mexico / Canada Rose, character of L'ÉPOQUE by Matthieu Bareyre, France

=== Signs of Life ===
- Signs of Life Award ELECTRONIC ART.FOUNDATION to the Best Film: Hai Shang Cheng Shi (The Fragile House) by Lin Zi, China
- Fundación Casa Wabi – Mantarraya Award: Le Discours D'acceptation Glorieux De Nicolas Chauvin by Benjamin Crotty, France

=== First Feature ===
- Swatch First Feature Award (Prize for Best First Feature): Alles Ist Gut by Eva Trobisch, Germany
- Swatch Art Peace Hotel Award: Rūgštus Miškas (Acid Forest) by Rugilė Barzdžiukaitė, Lithuania
- Special Mention: Tirss, Rihlat Alsoo'oud Ila Almar'i (Erased, Ascent of the Invisible) by Ghassan Halwani, Lebanon

=== Pardi di domani ===
==== Concorso internazionale ====
- Pardino d'oro for the Best International Short Film – Premio SRG SSR: D'un Château L'autre by Emmanuel Marre, Belgium / France
- Pardino d'argento SRG SSR for the Concorso internazionale: Heart of Hunger by Bernardo Zanotta, The Netherlands
- Pardi di domani Best Direction Prize – PIANIFICA: El Laberinto by Laura Huertas Millán, France / Colombia / USA
- Medien Patent Verwaltung AG Award: Je Sors Acheter Des Cigarettes by Osman Cerfon, France
- Special Mention: La Máxima Longitud De Un Puente by Simón Vélez, Colombia / Argentina

==== Concorso nazionale ====
- Pardino d'oro for the Best Swiss Short Film – Premio Swiss Life: Los Que Desean by Elena López Riera, Switzerland / Spain (Locarno Short Film Nominee For The European Film Awards 2018)
- Pardino d'argento Swiss Life for the Concorso nazionale: Abigaïl by Magdalena Froger, Switzerland
- Best Swiss Newcomer Award: Ici le chemin des ânes by Lou Rambert Preiss, Switzerland

=== Prix du Public UBS ===
- Prix du Public UBS: BLACKKKLANSMAN by Spike Lee, USA

=== Variety Piazza Grande Award ===
- Variety Piazza Grande Award: Le vent tourne by Bettina Oberli, Switzerland / France
