= Satan Never Sleeps =

1962 film by Leo McCarey

- DVD Cover
- Directed by: Leo McCarey
- Screenplay by: Claude Binyon
- Story by: Pearl S. Buck
- Produced by: Leo McCarey
- Starring: William Holden; Clifton Webb; France Nuyen; Athene Seyler; Martin Benson
- Cinematography: Oswald Morris
- Edited by: Gordon Pilkington
- Music by: Score: Richard Rodney Bennett; Songs: Jimmy McHugh (music); Harold Adamson (lyrics); Leo McCarey (lyrics)
- Distributed by: Twentieth Century-Fox Film Corporation
- Release date: March 23, 1962 (United States)
- Running time: 125 minutes
- Country: United States
- Language: English
- Budget: $2,885,000
- Box office: $1.5 million (US/Canada)

Satan Never Sleeps (also known as The Devil Never Sleeps and Flight from Terror) is a 1962 American drama romance war film directed by Leo McCarey, his final film, in which he returns to the religious themes of his classics Going My Way (1944) and The Bells of St. Mary's (1945). It also is the final screen appearance of actor Clifton Webb.

== Plot ==
In 1949, Catholic priests O'Banion and Bovard are constantly harassed by the Communist People's Party at their remote mission outpost in China. Adding to Father O'Banion's troubles is the mission's cook Siu Lan, an attractive Chinese girl who makes no secret of her love for him.

Under the leadership of Ho San, the communists wreck the mission dispensary and desecrate the chapel. Ho San straps O'Banion to a chair and rapes Siu Lan. Later, when she gives birth to a son, Ho San displays paternal pride but refuses to stop persecuting the priests.

Only after the villagers revolt and his superiors order the killing of all Christians, including his parents, does Ho San become convinced that communism will never solve China's problems. He tries to smuggle Siu Lan, his son and the two priests out of the compound, but their journey is halted within a few miles of freedom by a helicopter sent to prevent Ho San's defection. Before he can be restrained, Father Bovard dons Ho San's military cap and coat and drives away in the colonel's car. He dies in a spray of bullets from the helicopter, but his sacrifice enables the others to escape. Later, at mission headquarters in Hong Kong, O'Banion officiates at the wedding of Siu Lan and Ho San and baptizes their child.

== Cast ==
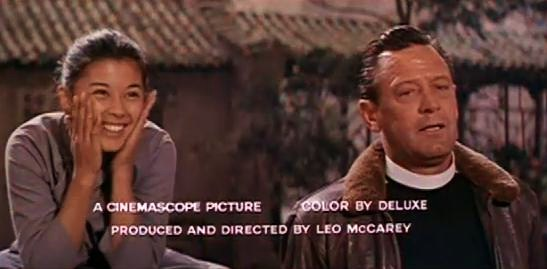
Nuyen and Holden in the film trailer.

- William Holden as Father O'Banion
- Clifton Webb as Father Bovard
- France Nuyen as Siu Lan
- Athene Seyler as Sister Agnes
- Martin Benson as Kuznietsky
- Edith Sharpe as Sister Theresa
- Robert Lee as Chung Ren
- Marie Yang as Ho San's mother
- Andy Ho as Ho San's father
- Burt Kwouk as Ah Wang
- Weaver Levy as Ho San
- Noel Hood as Sister Justine

== Production ==
Satan Never Sleeps had The China Story for working title. The film was based on an original screenplay by Pearl S. Buck called China Story that had been sold to 20th Century Fox. In 1950, Hal B. Wallis acquired it and in 1960, it came to Leo McCarey.

Hooper and Poague report McCarey's difficulties directing Satan Never Sleeps which he discussed in a 1965 Cahiers du Cinéma interview. According to McCarey, he left the film in disgust [due to] constant studio interference with his work and "modifications" to his script, and the final week's shooting was left to an assistant. They add that the final cut of Satan Never Sleeps was neither supervised nor approved by McCarey, "which may explain (if not excuse) the bizarre aspects of the film’s ending".

Biographer Wes D. Gehring notes that McCarey had conceived a denouement different from that which the studio inserted, in which "William Holden’s priest dies, rather than act upon his love for a woman".

The film was shot in England and Wales.

== Reception ==
In a contemporary review for The New York Times, critic A. H. Weiler called Satan Never Sleeps "a lackluster imitation" of Leo McCarey's Going My Way and wrote: "There is no doubt that the hearts of Mr. McCarey and company are in the right places but Satan Never Sleeps has little heart in it. This Satan is a direct descendant of Madama Butterfly and soap opera."

Critic Archer Winsten in The New York Post declared the film "embarrassingly predictable until it becomes so bad you couldn’t even imagine it".

In a current-day review, Time Out described Satan Never Sleeps as a "dreadful, trashy yarn" and "propaganda designed to equate Communism with Satan". The review concluded: "Satan may not sleep, but you will."

The film was mentioned in the book The Cleopatra Papers written by two Fox publicists. Jack Brodsky called an advertisement for the movie in the Sunday Times "the incredible ad of all time. A Chinese girl raped in front of a priest and Fox is trying to tell the world it's another Going My Way!" Nat Weiss later responded, Satan Never Sleeps opened today to record low business. The reviews are enough to begin bankruptcy proceedings here. Desperately, Charlie [Einfeld head of publicity] is trying to get the title song from Satan Never Sleeps sung from church pulpits next Sunday. We have time. Today is only Thursday."

== Theme ==
"The marriage which concludes the movie—a marriage which binds a rapist and his victim together for the sake of the rape-conceived child—can hardly be described as symbolic of social or personal health. Indeed, the fact of the marriage is attributable to an over-rigid social structure which McCarey implicitly condemns. The rape victim is cast out by her father, in order to save face: she has no real choice by to marry child’s father." — Film historian Leland Poague in The Hollywood Professionals, volume 7: Wilder and McCarey (1980)

Critic Leland Poague reports that both of McCarey's "Anti-Communist" films—My Son John (1952) and Satan Never Sleep—are "difficult to watch". Poague locates the weakness of Satan Never Sleeps less in its political metaphor for "personal and social rigidity" associated with Communist regimes, but rather a fundamental shift in McCarey's outlook that was "genuinely darker by the time he made the film".

Families, as social units, are "terribly important" to McCarey according to film historian Leland Poague. McCarey presents families as "basic to the continuation of life and society" in a number of his films, among these Make Way for Tomorrow (1937), Good Sam (1948), My Son John (1952), as well as Satan Never Sleeps. The appearance of priests in McCarey's films is a device that advances this theme. Poague notes the function of priests—here, Father O’Banion and Father Bovard—in addressing the conflicts inherent in family relationships:

McCarey’s sense of family dynamics allows us to account for the importance he generally assigns to priests in his films. Priests are unconventional to the degree that they have opted out of the family system, and as outsiders can provide the insight and knowledge required to save families from themselves…

== See also ==
- Freedom of religion in China

== Sources ==
- Gehring, Wes D. 2005. Leo McCarey: From Marx to McCarthy. The Scarecrow Press. Lantham, Maryland, Toronto, Oxford. ISBN 0-8108-5263-2
- Hooper, Gary and Poague, Leland. 1980. Leo McCarey Filmography in The Hollywood Professionals: Wilder and McCarey, Volume 7. The Tanvity Press, A. S. Barnes and Company, Inc, San Diego, California. pp. 295–314 ISBN 978-0498021817
- Poague, Leland. 1980. The Hollywood Professionals: Wilder and McCarey, Volume 7. The Tanvity Press, A. S. Barnes and Company, Inc. San Diego, California. ISBN 978-0498021817
