= Farahmand =

Farahmand (Persian: فرهمند) is a Persian surname. Notable people with the surname include:

- Reza Farahmand (born c.1977), Iranian film director
- Saam Farahmand (born 1979), Iranian-British film and music video director
