= There's That Woman Again =

1938 film

- Directed by: Alexander Hall
- Written by: Philip G. Epstein; Ken Englund; James Edward Grant
- Story by: Wilson Collison
- Based on: a play by Gladys Lehman
- Produced by: Harry Cohn (uncredited)
- Starring: Melvyn Douglas; Virginia Bruce; Margaret Lindsay
- Cinematography: Joseph Walker
- Edited by: Viola Lawrence
- Music by: Leigh Harline (uncredited)
- Production company: Columbia Pictures
- Distributed by: Columbia Pictures
- Release date: December 24, 1938
- Running time: 72 minutes
- Country: United States
- Language: English

There's That Woman Again is a 1938 American comedy mystery film directed by Alexander Hall. It is the sequel to There's Always a Woman, released the same year. In both films, Melvyn Douglas stars as a private investigator whose wife involves herself in his work. Joan Blondell played the wife in the first film, but that role went to Virginia Bruce in this one.

== Plot ==
Private detective Bill Reardon is awakened one morning by his dizzy wife Sally, who cannot remember what the string tied to her finger is supposed to remind her of. While discussing the unfortunate financial condition of their private detective agency during breakfast, he is called by Mr. Stone (his only client). Stone demands to know why he has not shown up for an important meeting to discuss the recent robberies at the jewelry store where Stone works. Sally was supposed to tell her husband about the meeting. Reardon hurries off to meet with Stone and Mr. Davis (the store's manager and former owner), along with Mrs. Nacelle, the wife of the rich store owner. Reardon informs them that he has a solid suspect for the crimes, a clerk named Charles Crenshaw.

Meanwhile, Crenshaw shows up at the Reardon detective agency and wants to hire them to find out why he is being followed by an unknown man who recently searched his apartment. Sally pretends to be one of the agency's detectives, hoping to help her husband's failing business. She accepts Crenshaw's case. However, the man who followed him and searched his apartment is actually Bill Reardon.

That afternoon, Bill Reardon has lunch with the attractive Mrs. Nacelle, who informs him that her husband took over the store from Davis because he owed her husband money. Mrs. Nacelle thinks Davis resents losing the store and suggests that he might be the thief.

Sally Reardon shows up at the restaurant and overhears her husband say that Crenshaw is the chief suspect for the jewel thefts. Believing Crenshaw is innocent, Sally quickly leaves the restaurant so she can call the young clerk at the jewelry store and warn him. Soon afterwards, Reardon and his agents apprehend Crenshaw.

That evening the Reardons join Mr. and Mrs. Nacelle for dinner at a posh nightclub. Davis is seen leaving the nightclub, and he deliberated picks up a note at the hat check stand which was left for Tony Croy, a known mob boss. Moments later, Croy arrives and asks the hat check girl if there is a note for him, but the girl says it was just picked up by another man who claimed to be him. Davis leaves in a cab, and Croy follows him. In the cab, Davis reads the note he stole, which gives the location of some unnamed object in a specific filing cabinet at the store. Davis goes to store to find out what the note refers to, but he is shot by an unseen assailant.

Meanwhile, back at the nightclub, Sally devises a harebrained scheme to help clear Crenshaw of the robberies by stealing something from the store while Crenshaw is still in jail, which would prove he is not the culprit. Using keys she takes from Mrs. Nacelle's purse, she goes to the store and steals several items from a display case.

Bill Reardon finds the note that Davis brought to the store the night before and realizes that it is connected to the case.

Bill and Sally Reardon eventually discover that Croy and Mrs. Nacelle were married, but never got divorced. Croy has been blackmailing Mrs. Nacelle, forcing her to steal jewelry from her husband's store. When Croy comes to Mrs. Nacelle's mansion to collect the stolen jewels, she tricks him by having him open a safe which is rigged to fire a gun attached to a device inside.

Back at the store, Bill shows the police detectives that Davis was actually killed by a trick gun which fired from inside the file drawer when it was opened — the same trick Mrs. Nacelle used at her home. The rigged filing cabinet drawer was meant to kill Croy. Bill and Sally Reardon set a trap for Mrs. Nacelle, solve the case, and lead the police to a final showdown with the murderous wife.

== Cast ==
- Melvyn Douglas as William "Bill" Reardon
- Virginia Bruce as Sally Reardon
- Margaret Lindsay as Mrs. Nacelle
- Stanley Ridges as Tony Croy
- Gordon Oliver as Charles Crenshaw
- Tom Dugan as Flannigan
- Don Beddoe as Johnson
- Jonathan Hale as Rolfe Davis
- Pierre Watkin as Mr. Nacelle
- Paul Harvey as Stone
- Lillian Yarbo as Ladies Room Attendant (uncredited)

== Reception ==
In The New York Times, Frank Nugent described it as "a crudely jointed mystery film", but conceded "it's a harmless way of killing time."
