= We Faw Down =

1928 film

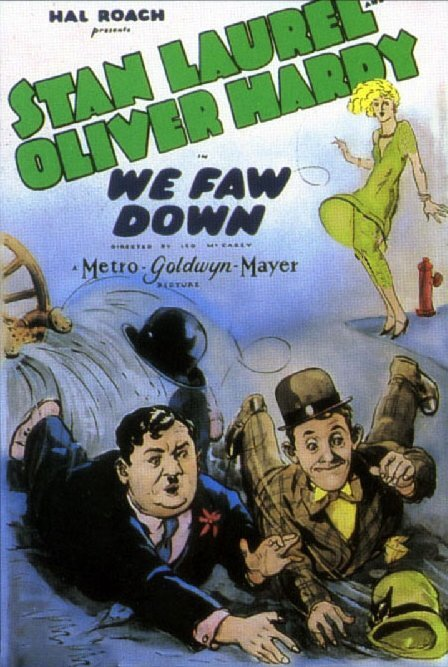
- Theatrical release poster
- Directed by: Leo McCarey
- Written by: H. M. Walker
- Produced by: Hal Roach
- Starring: Stan Laurel; Oliver Hardy; Vivien Oakland; Bess Flowers; Kay Deslys
- Distributed by: Metro-Goldwyn-Mayer
- Release date: December 29, 1928
- Running time: 20 minutes
- Country: United States
- Languages: Synchronized Sound; English (Intertitles)

We Faw Down is a synchronized sound short subject film directed by Leo McCarey starring comedy duo Laurel and Hardy. It was released by Metro-Goldwyn-Mayer on December 29, 1928. While the film has no audible dialog, it was released with a synchronized orchestral musical score with sound effects. It was remade in part with their film Sons of the Desert in 1933.

== Plot ==
Stan and Ollie are about to attend a poker game when Ollie receives a telephone call telling them their absence is holding up the game. Ollie then tells their wives they have a business engagement at the Orpheum Theater and sneak off to their poker game. En route, they gallantly stop to assist two young ladies retrieve a hat that has blown under a parked car. They end up being soaked by a passing street-cleaning vehicle while trying to retrieve it. The girls invite them up to their apartment while their clothes dry. One of the females becomes very amorous with Stan and all proceed to become blotto with beer.

A large boyfriend of one of the females appears at the apartment, sending the duo scrambling out the back window, in full view of their wives who have already seen a newspaper headline announcing that the Orpheum Theater had been gutted by a fire. The rest of the story is about how the duo lie to their unimpressed wives in ever-escalating tall tales about the things they supposedly saw at the theater, before realizing the truth and being chased out by the wives. It does not help matters when the two "pickups" arrive to return Ollie's vest, which he left behind in their apartment. Stan and Ollie flee down a long alleyway with their wives firing shotguns at them. The noise causes dozens of panicky cheating husbands to leap out of every window in the apartment complex.

== Cast ==
- Stan Laurel as Stanley
- Oliver Hardy as Ollie
- Bess Flowers as Mrs. Laurel
- Vivien Oakland as Mrs. Hardy
- Kay Deslys as Kelly's Girlfriend
- Vera White as Kay's Friend
- George Kotsonaros as "First Round" Kelly (uncredited)

== Production notes ==
We Faw Down was filmed in August and September 1928. It was the first Laurel & Hardy film directed by Leo McCarey in the director's chair after being a character development supervisor for a period. McCarey would go on to direct their best silent entries. We Faw Down was reworked during the sound era into the three-reeler Be Big!, and the feature-length Sons of the Desert.

A contemporary account says that the basic story was contributed, unusually, by Oliver Hardy, who had heard similar gossip from his laundress. Critic/historian William K. Everson makes a different contention, tracing the story back to the Mack Sennett comedy Ambrose's First Falsehood. Interior shooting took place at the Hal Roach studio; exteriors were shot both on the Roach back lot and on several locations in Culver City.

The original Victor sound discs for We Faw Down were thought lost until the 1990s, when a set was discovered. Certain European DVD editions feature this original synchronized score, but American DVDs (Region 1) still have music cannibalized from other Laurel & Hardy Victor soundtracks.

As originally scripted and shot, We Faw Down features the duo fleeing the girls' apartment having pulled on each other's pants, then dart from spot to spot in town trying to find a private place to rectify the situation. An irate husband, suspicious cop and belligerent king crab all conspire to thwart the swapping of the pants. Though excised from We Faw Down, the footage would be used for their next film Liberty. Stan Laurel would eventually reuse this plot device for 1938's Block-Heads.

== Reception ==
British film critic Leslie Halliwell gave the film a lukewarm reception, calling it "moderate star comedy." Laurel and Hardy Encyclopedia author Glenn Mitchell added that the film was "typical of their matrimonial comedies,". Allmovie.com critic Bruce Calvert said "while this film is only an average comedy, it is still worth a look. Laurel and Hardy's explanation of the 'show' and why they didn't know about the fire, is priceless." Laurel and Hardy: The Magic Behind the Movies author Randy Skretvedt wrote "All that We Faw Down proves is that even [Leo] McCarey could not always save a film from mediocrity.... [it's] amusing but nothing to rave about." The Films of Laurel and Hardy author William K. Everson wrote in 1967 that the film "rather draggy and pedestrian, though it has isolated gags that are among their best. Particularly amusing are the two flirts' attempts to inject some life into their two pickups.... The best gag of all, however, is the.... brilliant and untoppable climactic gag."
