= Among Those Present =

1921 film by Fred C. Newmeyer

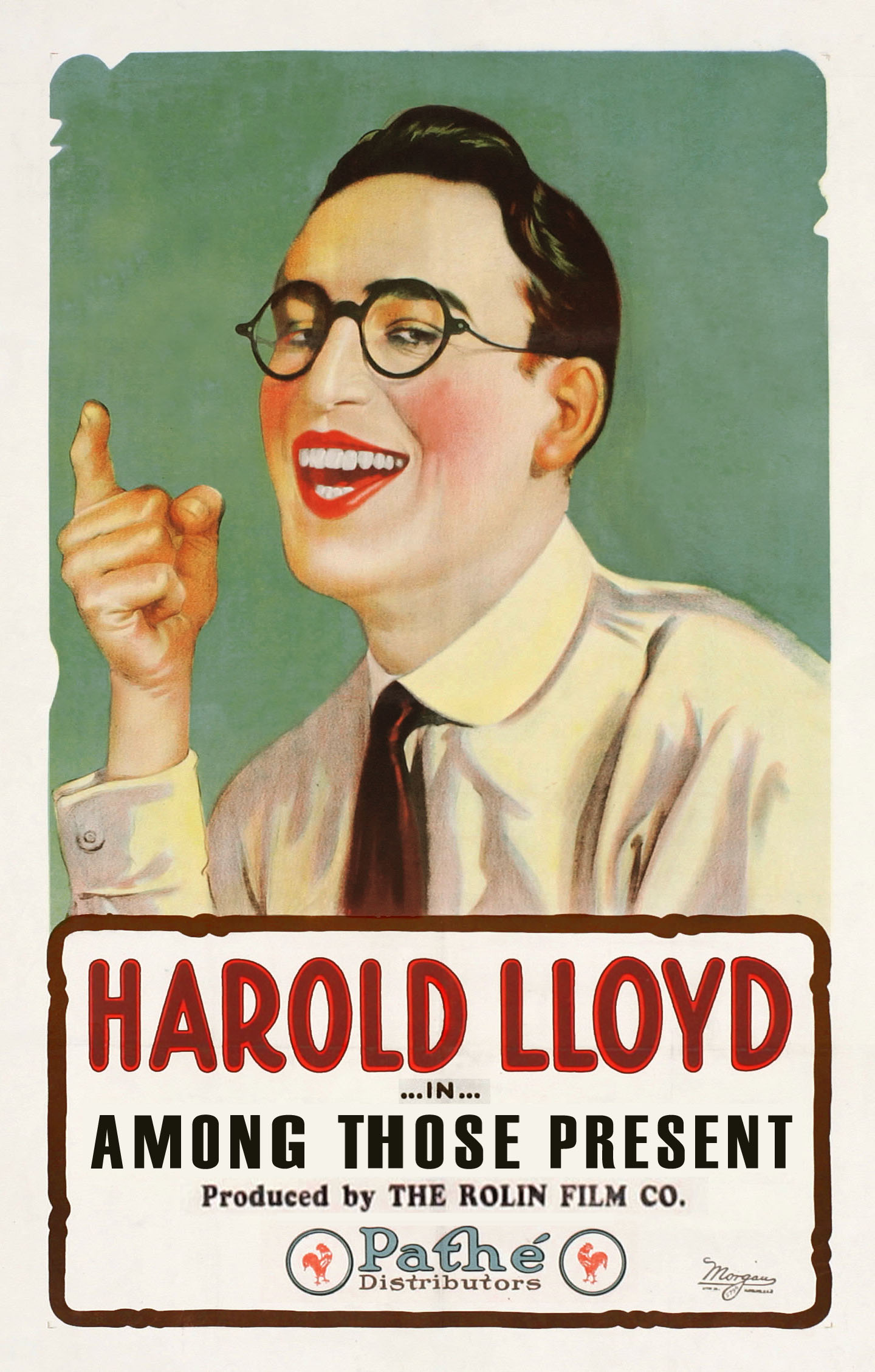
- Theatrical poster for Among Those Present
- Directed by: Fred C. Newmeyer
- Written by: Hal Roach; Sam Taylor; H. M. Walker
- Produced by: Hal Roach
- Starring: Harold Lloyd
- Cinematography: Walter Lundin
- Edited by: Thomas J. Crizer
- Music by: Robert Israel
- Production company: Rolin Film Company
- Distributed by: Pathé Exchange
- Release date: May 29, 1921
- Running time: 35 minutes
- Country: United States
- Language: Silent (English intertitles)

Among Those Present is a 1921 American "three-reeler" silent comedy film directed by Fred C. Newmeyer, and starring Harold Lloyd and Mildred Davis.

== Plot ==
The bellboy at the Ritz-Waldorf hotel poses as Lord Algernon Abbott Aberdeen Abernathy and attends a fox hunt hosted by the nouveau riche O'Briens. He promptly falls in love with their daughter. After dazzling the party guests with tales of his great horsemanship, he is asked to ride Dynamite, their meanest horse, during the hunt– a stressful experience. Later learning that he was introduced to the O'Briens as part of a plan to rob them, he exposes the conspirators, and reveals himself as the bellhop. While Mrs. O'Brien is scandalized, Mr. O'Brien approves of the boy's relationship with their daughter.

== Cast ==
- Harold Lloyd as The Boy
- Mildred Davis as The Girl
- James T. Kelley as Mr. O'Brien, the Father
- Aggie Herring as Mrs. O'Brien, the Mother
- Vera White as Society Pilot
- William Gillespie as Hard Boiled Party

== Production ==
The film used several uncredited actors including:

- Rollin Aremz
- Olive Barker
- Hal Berg
- K. Bleus
- Roy Brooks
- Sammy Brooks as Guest
- Bobby Brydon
- Evelyn Burns
- Jack Byron
- Joe Campbell
- Al Caukins
- Margaret Cleveland
- Barney Crozier
- Mary Culver
- Frank Daniels
- Grace Darnell
- Harry Davenport
- Olive Ellingwood
- W.H. Ely
- Lillian Farrell
- Nell Folt
- Carla Freege
- Jim Gether
- Louis Goldstone
- Minette Grosse
- Dorothy Hagan
- Adelaide Hallock
- Jules Hanft
- Jessie Heathman
- Jay Higgins
- Ray L. Holmes
- Slim Holmes
- Harry Howard
- Wallace Howe as Butler
- Mark Jones as Horse Handler
- Clo King
- Nellie Kushell
- M.S. Lacey
- Gaylord Lloyd
- Chris Lynton
- Bert Maddox
- William McCormack
- Jack McGinnis
- E.G. Miller
- Harold Miller
- Marie Mills
- Dorothy Morgan
- Jack Morgan
- Dolly Mullen
- George Murphy
- Louis Natheaux
- Alice Nichols
- William H. O'Brien
- Richard Pannell
- Tex Parker, Hazel Powell
- Gus Priddy
- Joe Ray
- James Richardson
- Bertha Roberts
- Betty Roddy
- Laura Roessing
- Constantine Romanoff
- Jack Russell
- Lou Salter
- Alma Saunders
- Don Saunders
- Alma Schram
- Olaf Schuler
- Louis Shank
- Jerry Shelton
- Ida Shoemaker
- William Sidmore
- H.C. Simmons
- Jack Singleton
- Crete Sipple
- Lyle Tayo
- Jessalyn Van Trump
- Anna Wilson
- Noah Young as Horse Handler

== See also ==
- Harold Lloyd filmography
