= Artists and Models Abroad =

1938 film by Mitchell Leisen

- Directed by: Mitchell Leisen
- Written by: Ken Englund; Howard Lindsay (story & screenplay); Russel Crouse (story & screenplay); J.P. McEvoy (story)
- Produced by: Arthur Hornblow Jr.
- Starring: Jack Benny; Joan Bennett; Mary Boland
- Cinematography: Ted Tetzlaff
- Edited by: Doane Harrison
- Music by: Gerard Carbonara; John Leipold (uncredited)
- Production company: Paramount Pictures
- Distributed by: Paramount Pictures
- Release date: December 20, 1938
- Running time: 90 minutes
- Country: United States
- Language: English

Artists and Models Abroad (UK title: Stranded in Paris) is a 1938 American musical comedy film directed by Mitchell Leisen and starring Jack Benny, Joan Bennett and Mary Boland. It was made by Paramount Pictures. The screenplay was written by Ken Englund, Howard Lindsay and Russel Crouse.

== Plot ==
Patricia Harper is the heiress daughter of a billionaire oil tycoon, James Harper, having dinner with Mrs. Isabel Channing and Elliott Winthrop, whom Mrs. Channing wants Patricia to marry. Caught up in Mrs. Channing's need to behave ‘proper’, Patricia expresses her wish to live a normal life and enjoy simple mundane things. Elliott announces his promotion as U.S. ambassador to France. He is then called away to the consulate to handle a problem at the gate.

This is where Elliott meets the American dance troupe, led by Buck Boswell, asking for an emergency fare back to the U.S. Elliott declares that there is no such contingency in the budget for such an occasion (or else no one would buy a return flight home) and wishes them luck before, presumably, returning to dinner. Buck then promises the troupe that he'll get them back and brings them to an expensive hotel on the premise that they don't have the money to pay for it regardless so they might as well live it up.

Upon their arrival, Buck and The Yacht Club Boys (named Swifty, Dopey, Jimmy, and Kelly in the film) convince the owner of the hotel that they have money and are used to paying at the end of their stay instead of the beginning. The owner, mesmerized by the thought that all Americans have money, allows them to move into their rooms, against the will of his wife.

However the next day, while the troupe is practising their cowboy & Indians routine, the hotel owner's wife locks them out of their rooms, and in order for their rooms to be unlocked she insists that they pay their bill. To get their belongings back, the girls push the guys to go out and find jobs. Buck receives 5 francs from one of the girls, the last 5 francs to the name of any troupe member.

Walking down the street, Buck is called on by Patricia Harper, who recognizes him as American by his cowboy outfit. She tells him that she has left her money in her hotel room and asks him to cover the 3 franc bill for her breakfast, which he does. Then, thinking she's a scammer who also has not a penny to her name, he invites her to act with his troupe. Seeking adventure as a normal person, Patricia keeps her wealth a secret and plays along.

They go back to the hotel, and Patricia pretends to be suicidal to lure the staff to the roof, so the troupe can grab the keys to get their belongings from their rooms. After this, the staff wises up and calls the police on the troupe, joined by Patricia's’ father, who found her after she let Mrs. Channing know she wasn't coming home. The troupe is now forced to climb through the window and climb to another building, in order to escape the police.

Still running from the police, they manage to hide out in an old studio full of mannequins that they think is abandoned. After evading the police by posing as mannequins, they decide to spend the night. Upon waking up, they hear people talking. Thinking it's the police, they prepare to run. Overhearing a producer's conversation, Buck realizes that it's a theater that's putting on a show. Buck runs into another troupe from Russia, that then thinks he is the producer. He turns them away, and his troupe takes the Russians' place.

After rehearsals, Patricia's father sees the royal jewels in a case and asks if he can buy them, not realizing what they are. After being declined he steals them before the troupe leaves. This leads to a mad hunt for the jewel thieves.

Patricia's father has a copy of the jewels made for Patricia, as a present. The jewels get mixed up when Patricia's father shows them to Ms. Channing.

Buck is back at Patricia's father's hotel, where he planned on gifting the replica necklace to her. He hides it, but Buck finds it while snooping around, suspicious of her father. There is a knock on the door, and a mad scramble to leave the hotel room. While this is going on, Buck stays behind and is introduced to a man while the troupe is running away because they think it's the police still after them. The man turns out to be an oil magnate to whom Patricia's father plans to sell his oil, and Buck, thinking that the old man is running a scam on the oil magnate, rips up the contract.

Buck then becomes wise and tells the troupe that he'll get them home by returning the jewels, so that either the French will be grateful and give them the fare home, or will think they stole it and deport them. The French lock him and the troupe up, but upon realizing the jewels were a replica, they let Buck go, and send people to follow him.

Buck goes to confront Patricia and her father, who are out at dinner with Elliot and Ms. Channing. There is a struggle, and the jewels get stuck on the roof. After retrieving them, they are all arrested. Back at the police station, everyone's real identity is revealed. Everyone is released, and Buck & Patricia get married.

== Cast ==
- Jack Benny as Buck Boswell
- Joan Bennett as Patricia Harper
- Mary Boland as Mrs. Isabel Channing
- Charley Grapewin as James Harper
- Fritz Feld as Dubois
- Yacht Club Boys

== Production ==
According to the Production Encyclopedia, Paramount started production in 1937. The first three models cast were Marie De Forest, Harriette Haddon, and Norma Thelan; Leroy Prinz said of them: "I consider these three girls to have the most perfect figures of the current beauty crop."

In the Spanish magazine Cine--Mundial it is mentioned that in one of the pool scenes they used foam instead of water in order to prevent the actresses from getting sick.

In the Paramount International News volume 5 no. 5 in May 1938, Mary Boland and Joan Bennett were added to the film whose name was confirmed as "Artists & Models Abroad". In volume 5 no. 6 in June 1938, Jean Sablon, French singer, was added to the cast for a specialty number. In July 1938, the cast was augmented and Evelyn Keyes was brought in to play Marie Antoinette in a beauty pageant.

== Promotion ==
This being a sequel to the successful Artists & Models, Paramount promoted this film heavily for its holiday release. This included several interviews and articles published months in advance of the film's release. They even got the National Board of Review Magazine to give it a classification of ‘Movies worth an audience's patronage’.

Among print ads put up in newspapers and journals, they also had radio ads for the film according to a Dec 1938 article in The Film Daily. The whole premise of its advertising campaign was that the best gift you could give for the holidays was a ticket to see this movie.

There were a few interviews in Photoplay Magazine with the famous designer Edith Head who was in charge of designing the clothes for Joan Bennett to wear in the film.

Several posters were made for the film, some of which are in different languages including Spanish. The film was marketing to multiple regions & Spanish magazines reviewed the film.

Advertising was heavily marketed to fashion-conscious women.

== Reception ==
The U. S. theatrical release of the film was on December 20, 1938.

The film opened at the Paramount theater in NYC where it played at capacity over the holidays, according to a December 1938 article in The Film Daily.

There were many reviews of this film ahead of its release on December 20.

"Watch this clean up at the box office with its appeal both to the femmes and the men." - The Film Daily (pre-release)

"Mass Entertainment at its best"- Motion Picture Herald (pre-release)

Upon its initial release at the Paramount, the reviews were mixed.

"Few came to see it, less liked the show" - H. Workman (Shakopee, Minn)

"The lowest grosses in 6 months and the picture didn't deserve better" -R. Lee (Covington, Ohio)

"The cast should go to Paris, and stay there" - S. Roberts (Camden, ME)

"A gay and irrepressible comedy..." - Silver Screen
