= Sweet Rosie O'Grady =

1943 film by Irving Cummings

- Directed by: Irving Cummings
- Screenplay by: Ken Englund
- Story by: William R. Lippman; Frederick Stephani; Edward Van Every
- Produced by: William Perlberg
- Starring: Betty Grable; Robert Young; Adolphe Menjou; Reginald Gardiner
- Cinematography: Ernest Palmer
- Edited by: Robert L. Simpson
- Music by: Harry Warren (music); Mack Gordon (lyrics); Leigh Harline; Charles E. Henderson; Cyril J. Mockridge; Herbert W. Spencer
- Distributed by: 20th Century Fox
- Release date: October 1, 1943
- Running time: 74 minutes
- Country: United States
- Language: English
- Budget: $1,185,000
- Box office: $2,964,000 (US rentals)

Sweet Rosie O'Grady is a 1943 Technicolor musical film about an American singer who attempts to better herself by marrying an English duke, but is harassed by a reporter. Directed by Irving Cummings, it stars Betty Grable and Robert Young.

== Cast ==
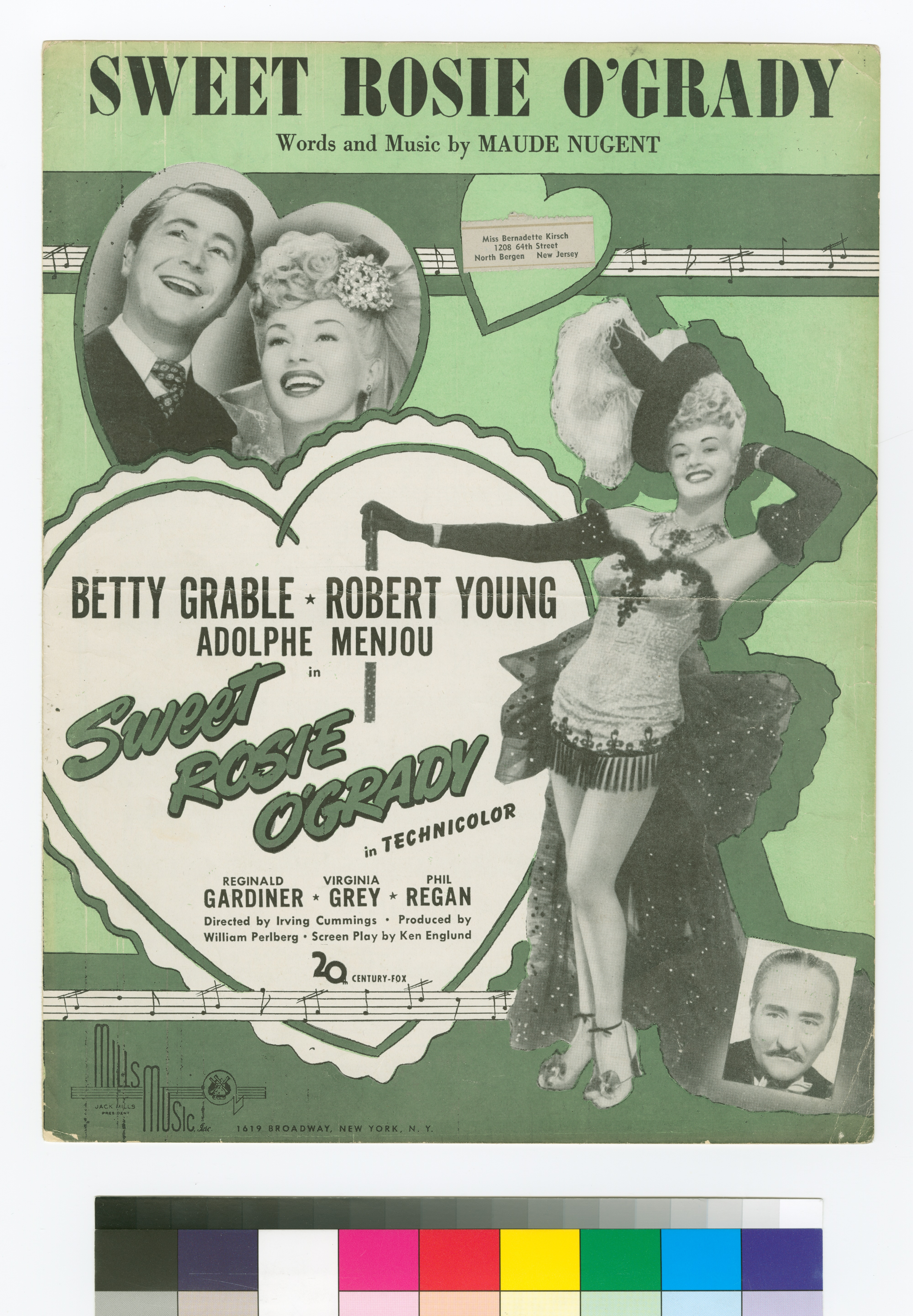
The cover of sheet music for the titular song from the movie

- Betty Grable as Madeleine Marlowe / Rosie O'Grady
- Robert Young as Sam Magee
- Adolphe Menjou as Thomas Moran
- Reginald Gardiner as Charles, Duke of Trippingham
- Virginia Grey as Edna Van Dyke
- Phil Regan as Mr. Clark
- Sig Ruman as Joe Flugelman
- Alan Dinehart as Arthur Skinner
- Hobart Cavanaugh as Clark
- Frank Orth as Taxi Driver
- Jonathan Hale as Mr. Fox
- George Cockerill as Singer

== Box office ==
Betty Grable was the number one box-office attraction at the time of this film's release. Her other film that year was Coney Island, and both were among the top 10 highest-grossing films of 1943 and two of 20th Century Fox's big money makers that year.
