= Good Girls Go to Paris =

1939 film by Alexander Hall

- Directed by: Alexander Hall
- Written by: Gladys Lehman; Ken Englund
- Based on: "Miss Aesop Butters Her Bread" by Lenore Coffee and William J. Cowen
- Produced by: William Perlberg
- Starring: Melvyn Douglas; Joan Blondell
- Cinematography: Henry Freulich
- Edited by: Al Clark
- Production company: Columbia Pictures
- Distributed by: Columbia Pictures
- Release date: June 30, 1939
- Running time: 75 minutes
- Country: United States
- Language: English

Good Girls Go to Paris is a 1939 American romantic comedy film starring Melvyn Douglas and Joan Blondell.

== Plot ==
Jenny Swanson, a waitress in a small college town, dreams of going to Paris by any means necessary. She confides her plan for a little gold-digging and blackmail to Ronald "Ronnie" Brooke, a professor on exchange from England. Brooke tries to dissuade her, telling her that "good girls go to Paris, too."

Her first attempt ends badly. Although she attracts rich Ted Dayton Jr., his father refuses to pay her off, insisting she back up her claim that she has a written marriage proposal. When she does not produce it, the father threatens her with the police, unless she agrees to leave town and never come back. She tells Brooke she had the letter in her purse, but at the last moment, could not bring herself to take it out. Brooke advises her to go home, then reveals that he is getting married in New York City and returning to England. Jenny starts to buy a ticket home, but then decides to go to New York instead.

At the train station, she runs into Brooke and his fiancée's brother, Tom Brand. She and Tom become acquainted on the train. He likes her very much, even after she tells him all about her blackmail attempt. In New York City, he takes her to nightclub after nightclub. At one, she encounters Tom's mother Caroline, out with her boyfriend Paul Kingston. At another, she spots Sylvia Brand, Brooke's fiancée, dancing with medical student Dennis Jeffers, whom Sylvia has known since childhood. Jenny eavesdrops and learns that Sylvia is in love with Dennis, but fears being disinherited by her very wealthy grandfather Olaf if they married (Dennis is the son of the family butler). She also discovers that Tom owes $5000 in gambling debts to Mr. Schultz.

After Jenny brings a drunk Tom home very late at night, she encounters Caroline sneaking in. They wake up an irritable, ailing Olaf, so Caroline introduces her as Sylvia's friend from college. Jenny prescribes traditional Swedish remedies, which soon make Olaf much pleasanter. When Brooke shows up the next morning, he is flabbergasted to find she is a houseguest ... and one of Sylvia's bridesmaids. She soon becomes a great favorite of Olaf's. He would be very pleased to have Tom marry her.

Crises abound. First, Schultz comes for his money. Jenny keeps him from seeing Olaf, who knows nothing about Tom's debt, and promises to pay him tomorrow. Next, Dennis injures a man while driving; Sylvia is a passenger and gives her name as Jenny Swanson to avoid scandal. She asks Jenny to play along, so Jenny demands $5000 to do it. That takes care of Tom's IOUs. When she learns that Paul and Caroline plan to elope, Jenny arranges it so that Caroline learns the truth: that Paul is only after her wealth. Then, Olaf announces Tom and Jenny's engagement at his party. Finally, an attorney representing the injured man barges in to speak to Olaf, followed a little later by the Daytons, who have their own quarrel with Olaf. Olaf gathers his family to figure out what is going on. Eventually, everything is straightened out: Sylvia gets Dennis, and Brooke gets Jenny.

== Cast ==
- Melvyn Douglas as Ronald Brooke
- Joan Blondell as Jenny Swanson
- Walter Connolly as Olaf Brand
- Alan Curtis as Tom Brand
- Joan Perry as Sylvia Brand
- Isabel Jeans as Caroline Brand
- Stanley Brown as Ted Dayton Jr.
- Alexander D'Arcy as Paul Kingston
- Henry Hunter as Dennis Jeffers
- Clarence Kolb as Ted Dayton Sr.
- Howard Hickman as Jeffers
- Mary Field as Ada - Brand's Maid

== Production ==
The film was originally intended to star Charles Boyer and Jean Arthur. Arthur pulled out first, followed by Boyer. Boyer rejected the offer to star in Love Affair.

== Reception ==
New York Times reviewer Frank Nugent was of the opinion that the cast was trying too hard, and "the general effect, consequently, is not so much that of an appeal to the humorous instinct of the onlooker as an attack upon it". P. S. Harrison rated it "a pretty good comedy" and advised exhibitors: "It should go over with the masses, for the light story presents no problems".
