= Ken Englund =

American screenwriter

- Born: May 6, 1914; Chicago, Illinois
- Died: August 10, 1993 (aged 79); Woodland Hills, Los Angeles, California
- Occupation: Screenwriter
- Spouse: Mabel Albertson (m. 1937; div. 1950)

Ken Englund (May 6, 1914 – August 10, 1993) was an American screenwriter. He wrote the films The Big Broadcast of 1938, Artists and Models Abroad, There's That Woman Again, Good Girls Go to Paris, Slightly Honorable, The Doctor Takes a Wife, No, No, Nanette, This Thing Called Love, Nothing but the Truth, Rings on Her Fingers, Springtime in the Rockies, Sweet Rosie O'Grady, Here Come the Waves, The Unseen, The Secret Life of Walter Mitty, Good Sam, A Millionaire for Christy, Androcles and the Lion, Never Wave at a WAC, The Vagabond King and The Wicked Dreams of Paula Schultz.

He got a job in his 20s as a writer for Phil Baker's radio show and joined Paramount Pictures in 1937. He was the lead writer for Joyce Brothers' television series.

He was president of the Writers Guild of America West from 1958 to 1961 and became vice president of the council in 1961.

He also had three books published: Tour D'Amour, Larks in a Casserole and The Ghosts in Emily's Trunk.

After his divorce from Mabel Albertson in 1950 he married Bernadine Simpson from Waupaca, Wisconsin who appeared in Never Wave at a WAC.

After a stroke in 1985, he moved into the Motion Picture & Television Fund Hospital in Woodland Hills, Los Angeles, California. He died on August 10, 1993, in the hospital at age 79.
