= Vera White =

Australian actress (1893–1949)

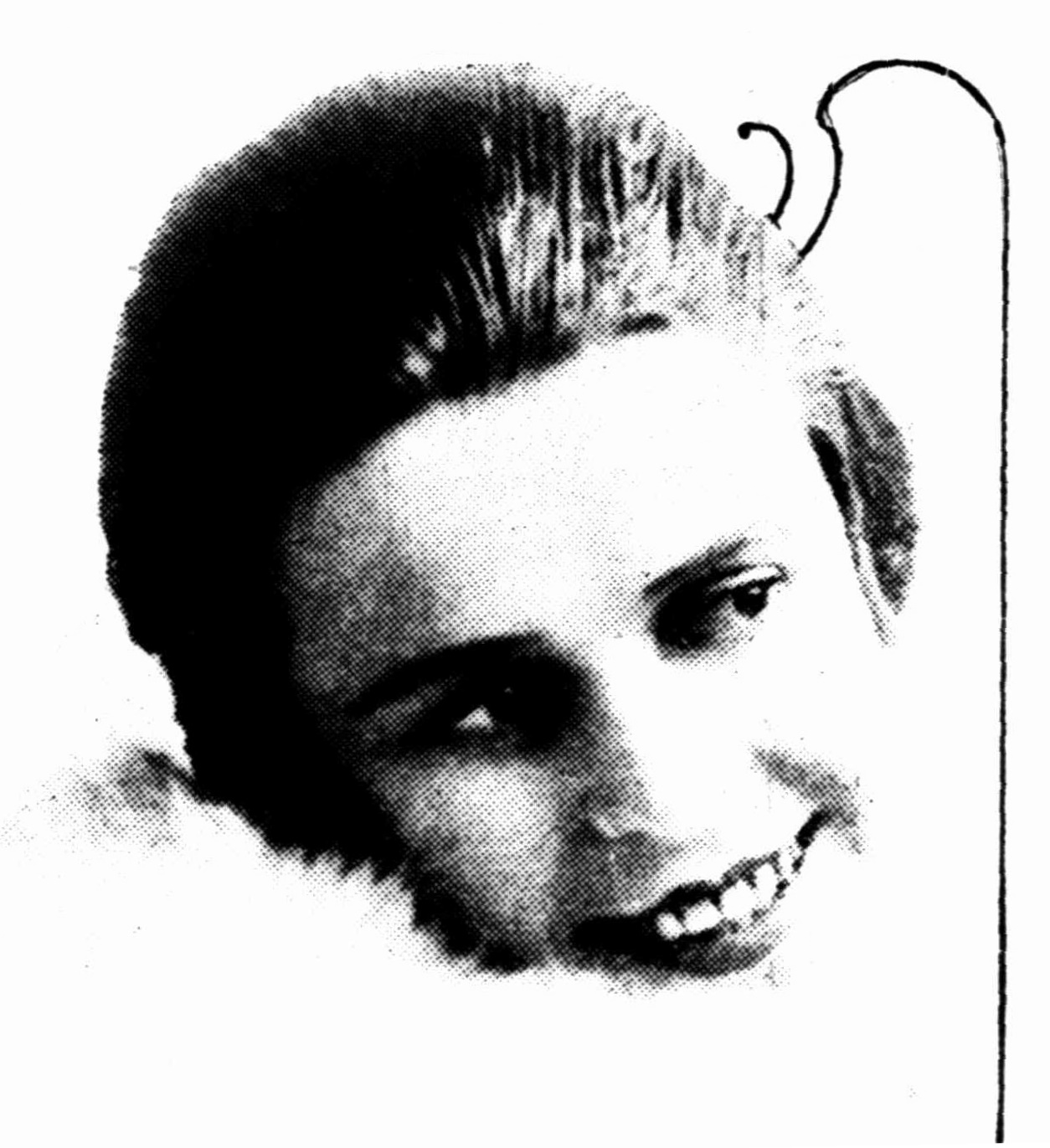
- Publicity photograph of Vera White, published in July 1919.
- Born: Harriet Vera Gertrude White; 13 September 1893; Melbourne, Australia
- Died: 11 November 1949 (aged 56)

Vera White (1893 - 1949) was an Australian actress primarily in silent films.

Born in Melbourne, perhaps her most accessible performance today is as "Kay's Friend" in the 1928 Laurel and Hardy silent short subject We Faw Down. She delivers to Stan the pie that prevents Ollie from being stabbed by pugilist "One Round" Kelly; later, it's her delivery of Ollie's vest to his front door — and her coy fondism "Big Boy" — that provokes Mrs. Hardy's shotgun-wielding rampage that ends the picture.

== Filmography ==
- Swiss Miss (1938) — extra (uncredited)
- We Faw Down (1928) as Kay's Friend
  (aka We Slip Up (UK))
- The Cockeyed Family (1928) as Mrs. Beamish
- Is Your Daughter Safe? (1927) as Lady of Leisure
- Wide Open Spaces (1924) — (uncredited)
  (aka Wild Bill Hiccup (USA))
- Hustlin' Hank (1923)
- Where Am I? (1923)
- Friday, the Thirteenth (1922/II)
- Many Happy Returns (1922)
- Light Showers (1922)
- The Pickaninny (1921)
- Fifteen Minutes (1921)
- Late Hours (1921)
- Trolley Troubles (1921)
- Never Weaken (1921) — (uncredited)
- Sweet By and By (1921)
- I Do (1921) — (uncredited)
- On Their Way (1921)
- Stop Kidding (1921)
- Among Those Present (1921) as Society Pilot
