= Laura Huertas Millán =

French-Colombian artist and filmmaker

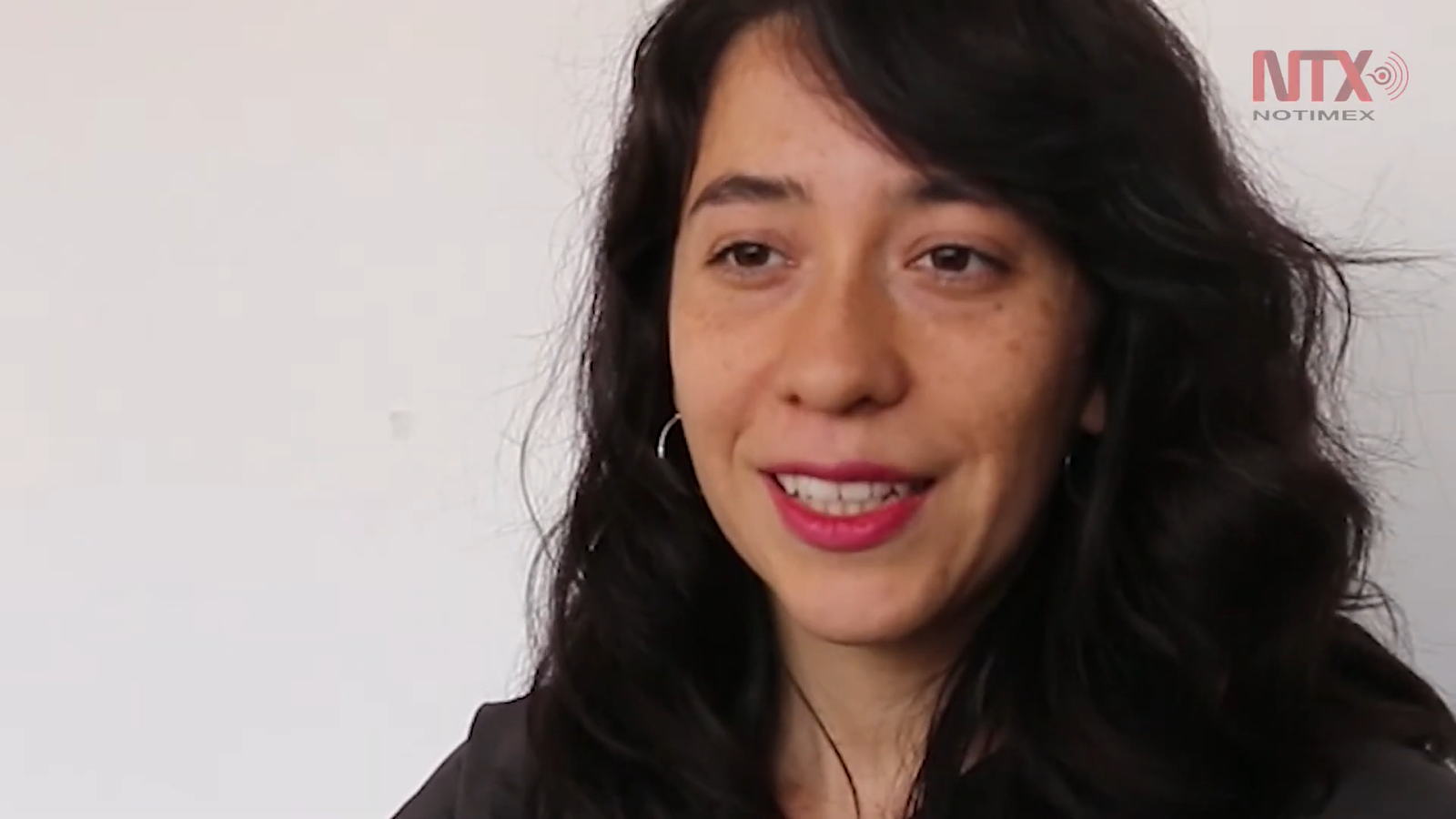
- Laura Huertas Millán
- Born: 1983 (age 42–43); Bogotá, Colombia
- Education: PSL University, Beaux-Arts de Paris, Le Fresnoy
- Website: https://www.laurahuertasmillan.com

Laura Huertas Millán (b. 1983) is a Colombian-French artist and filmmaker. Her works have been presented in various cinema festivals, including the IFFR, FIDMarseille, Cinéma du Réel, Berlinale (Forum Expanded), and Locarno Film Festival. Widely shown in the contemporary art world, her artworks are part of public and private collections in Europe and the Americas.

== Biography ==
Laura Huertas Millán was born in Bogotá, Colombia, in 1983. She moved to Paris for college where she earned a PhD in Ethnographic Fictions in 2017. Since then, she has produced work in the genre of ethnofiction, a method which blends anthropological evidence with elements of creative storytelling. Her work deals with themes of imperialism, the post-colonial Other, and objectification of non-Western bodies. As of 2020, Huertas Millán has created a total of eight films. Many of her works have been presented in solo and group exhibitions, solo screenings, and in cinema festivals. Huertas Millán also has written articles for art publications such as "De l'Amérique" (2011), "Les mythologies absentes" (2013), "The Obsidian King" (2016), and "The Liar" (2017).

== Education ==
Huertas Millán attended the School of Fine Arts (MFA, 2009) and Le Fresnoy (MFA, 2012), and received her PhD in Ethnographic Fictions in 2017 from PSL University (SACRe program).

== Artworks ==
In Huertas Millán's work in ethnofictions: a work that introduces art in the form of storytelling, she draws her inspiration from Chick Strand and Trinh T. Minh-ha; both filmmakers who offer critiques from an "imperialist and colonialist gaze." In this perspective, Huertas Millán examines the study of anthropological origins, such as cultural and social development that is seen in humans. Her artworks intersect between cinema and contemporary art to convey post-colonialism and social history as methodologies to her work, which analyses the direct origins that impact the way humans live. Jiíbie (2019), El Laberinto (2018), and Sol Negro (2016) are among many eminent works created by Huertas Millán that examine modern life in relation to its history.

=== Jiíbie (2019) ===
In Jiíbie (2019), her work focuses on nature and the pivotal roots the plant, jiíbie (or mambe), and its sacred ties with the Muiná-Muruí community; the native people of America who "have used and revered the coca leaf" and its production in the Colombian Amazon. The medium showcases the film in rich, dark colours with minimal gradient in the background to merge the distinct colors as the speaker voices the importance the plant. Jiíbie was presented in various cinema festivals, such as the Berlinale, Punto de Vista, Cámara Lúcida, and among many more; the film was also exhibited at the Future Generation Art Prize at Pinchuk Art Centre and Venice Biennale.

=== El Laberinto (2018) ===
Otherwise known as "The Labyrinth," Huertas Millán explores the cultures of contemporary Colombia, in which the devastation from narcocapitalism "coexists with enduring precolonial relations to the world, creating an accord between the violence of the drug wars, the violence of European conquest, and possibilities of survival and resistance against both." Laura Huertas Millán's El Laberinto (2018) was awarded by Locarno Festival (best direction prize), Bogoshorts Festival (best experimental short film; best editing; best script), and the Uruguay International Film Festival (special mention; best short film).

=== Sol Negro (2016) ===
In the film Sol Negro (2016), Huertas Millán employs the imagery of the solar eclipse to parallel the opera singer, Antonia, as she sings in an empty hall. Sol Negro, also known as "Black Sun," is evocative of the "dark spleen," in which doctors used to attribute "melancholic and suicidal drives, especially as they affected artists." Antonia is alluded as the "Black Sun," as she sings alone to voice her struggles. The fiction entangles in family bonds as an introspective polyphony, as "the voices of aunt, mother and daughter (the director herself) are heard as she struggles, through fiction, to escape from her family's fate." Sol Negro is credited by various screenings and has won many awards, such as the Muestra Internacional de Documental de Bogotá, Fronteira Film Festival, Doclisboa, and FIDMarseille.

=== Filmography ===
- Jiíbie, 25 mins, (2019)
- El Laberinto, 21 mins, (2018)
- jeny303, 6 mins, (2018)
- La Libertad, 29 mins, (2017)
- Sol Negro, 43 mins, (2016)
- Aequador, 19 mins, (2012)
- Journey to a land otherwise known, 23 mins, (2011)
- Sans laisser de trace, 3 mins, (2009)

== Exhibitions ==
Solo Exhibitions
| 2019 | Video Room: Laura Huertas Millán, Sao Paulo Museum of Art (MASP), Brazil. |
| 2018 | le chant du printemps. the spring song. Maison des Arts – Centre d’art de Malakoff, France. |
| 2016 | Ficción etnográfica. Museo de Arte Moderno de Medellín, Colombia. Disappearing operations. Laboratoires d’Aubervilliers, ENSBA, Paris, France. |
| 2015 | Apocalípticos e integrados. Metales pesados, Santiago de Chile, Chile. |
| 2013 | Aequador, Ici, Là-bas et Lisboa (duo). Villa Arson, Nice, France. |
| 2011 | Lógicas del fragmento. Alliance Française, Bogota, Colombia. |

== Collections ==
- Fondation ENSBA, Paris, France
- Kadist Foundation, San Francisco, USA
- Départements des Hauts-de-Seine, France
- Centre National des Arts Plastiques, France
- Département de Seine-Saint-Denis, France
- FRAC Lorraine, France
- Cisneros Fontanals Art Foundation, Miami, USA
- Banco de la República de Colombia

== Honors and awards ==
Awards
| 2018 | Emerging Artist Award, Fontanals Art Foundation (CIFO), Miami, USA. Best Direction Prize, Pardo di domani competition, Locarno Film Festival, Switzerland. Best Film Tenderfilm Award, Tenderpixel, London, England. Best experimental film, Bogoshorts, Colombia. Shortlisted, Future Generation Art Prize, PinchuckArtCenter, Kiev, Ukraine. |
| 2017 | Best Film, National Competition, MIDBO, Bogota, Colombia. Grand Prix, Biennale de la Jeune Création Européenne (BJC), Montrouge, France. Best short film, Fronteira Film Festival, Goiânia, Brazil. Conseil départemental des Hauts-de-Seine Prize, Salon de Montrouge, France |
| 2013 | Arquetopia Resartis Prize, Videobrasil Biennale, Sao Paulo, Brazil. |
| 2010 | Video prize, Fondation Beaux-Arts de Paris, Paris, France. |

== Publications ==
Art Publications
| 2017 | The Liar, in Permanent collection II, Aspen Art Museum, Aspen, USA. |
| 2016 | The Obsidian King, in Spike art quarterly, Vienna, Austria. Celestial Bodies, on Patricio Guzmán´s cinema, in Terremoto Magazine, Mexico city, Mexico. Avital Ronell´s Crackwars, duuuradio.fr. |
| 2013 | Les mythologies absentes, in Les cahiers du post-diplôme, EESI, Bourges, France. Histoire d’un vampire, in Film Papier, Galerie la Box, Bourges, France. |
| 2011 | De l'Amérique, in ENCOURS, Les Presses du Réel, Paris, France. Place ! Éditions Happy few and gallery Edouard Manet de Gennevilliers, Berlin, Germany. |

== Bibliography ==
- Charlotte Selb, “Entrevues, Laura Huertas Millan”, Revue 24 images, Dec.19.
- Clarisse Fabre, “Dans les festivals et les salles de cinéma, l’émergence du cinéma colombien”, Le Monde, June 16.
- Erika Balsom, “Speaking into Being: The Ethnographic Fictions of Laura Huertas Millán”, the spring song. le chant du printemps. solo exhibition booklet, Maison des Arts, Malakoff, France.
- Gilles Grand, “Voyage en la Terre Autrement Dite”, FID Marseille catalogue, Marseille, France.
- Jesse Cumming, “ The Ties that bind: on recent works by LHM”, Cinema Scope #73.
- Julien Bécourt, “L ́impermanence des choses”, Chronicart, July 27.
- Julien Petit, “Lógicas del Fragmento”, solo show at Alliance Française catalogue, Bogota, Colombia.
- Laura Huertas Millán's CV. https://www.laurahuertasmillan.com/s/LHMcvEN.pdf
- Leo Goldsmith, “Swiss Watch, films at Locarno Film Festival” Artforum, Aug. 20.
- Tony Pipolo, “Strangest things, on New York Film Festival”, Artforum, Oct. 3.
