= Diana Saqeb =

Diana Saqeb is a documentary film maker and women rights activist Saqeb was the festival coordinator of the first Autumn Human Rights Film Festival in 2009. She has worked as deputy director on the second and third editions of the Kabul International Film Festival; and Second Take, a film festival with a principal focus on gender and cinema. She is the chief editor of Theme, a magazine on cinema, theatre, music and television.

Her first documentary film 25 Percent deals with six female members of the Afghan parliament and the challenges they face in their daily lives. 25 Percent has been screened at many film festivals across the world.

Her second documentary Run Roobina Run is about Roobina Moqimyar, the first Afghan female athlete to participate in the Olympic Games. It was screened during the Beijing Olympic Games in 2010.

== Sources ==
- Autumn Human Rights Film Festival
- RFI
