= All Is Well (2018 film) =

2018 film directed by Eva Trobisch

- Alles ist gut
- Directed by: Eva Trobisch
- Written by: Eva Trobisch
- Starring: Aenne Schwarz; Andreas Döhler; Hans Löw
- Distributed by: Netflix
- Release dates: July 1, 2018 (Munich Film Festival); September 27, 2018
- Running time: 93 minutes
- Country: Germany
- Language: German

All Is Well (German: Alles ist gut) is a 2018 German drama film directed and written by Eva Trobisch.

== Cast ==
- Aenne Schwarz as Janne
- Andreas Döhler as Piet
- Hans Löw as Martin
- Tilo Nest as Robert
- Lina Wendel as Sabine
- Lisa Hagmeister as Sissi
- Dagny Dewath as Tina
- Thomas Gräßle as Flori
- Annika Blendl as Madlene
- Doris Buchrucker as Frau Hanneman
- Hildegard Faust-Albrecht as Frauenärztin
- Vera Flück as Schwester Tagesklinik
- Marc-Philipp Kochendörfer as Sicherheitsbeamter
- Valentina Kühnel as Pia
- Hermann Linnenbrink as Mann auf Fahrrad

== Release ==
=== Accolades ===
Eva Trobisch won the Stockholm Film Festival 2018 award for Best Director with the motivation: "For using a "coherent and subtle film-language (portraying) a character who shrinks her own mental space until there is nothing left, trying to refuse the reality that eats her up from inside."
