= Indiscreet (1931 film) =

1931 film by Leo McCarey

- Film poster
- Directed by: Leo McCarey
- Written by: Buddy G. DeSylva (story & scenario); Lew Brown (story & scenario); Ray Henderson (story & scenario); Leo McCarey
- Produced by: Lew Brown; Buddy G. DeSylva; Ray Henderson
- Starring: Gloria Swanson; Ben Lyon
- Cinematography: Ray June; Gregg Toland
- Edited by: Hal C. Kern
- Music by: Alfred Newman
- Distributed by: United Artists
- Release date: May 16, 1931
- Running time: 92 minutes; 74 minutes (re-release)
- Country: United States
- Language: English

Indiscreet is a 1931 American pre-Code comedy film directed by Leo McCarey and starring Gloria Swanson and Ben Lyon. The screenplay by Buddy G. DeSylva, Lew Brown, and Ray Henderson, based on their story Obey That Impulse, originally was written as a full-fledged musical, but only two songs – "If You Haven't Got Love" and "Come to Me" – remained when the film was released. The film is available on DVD.

== Plot ==
Determined to start the new year off right, dress designer Geraldine "Gerry" Trent sends her unfaithful boyfriend, Jim Woodward, packing. A short time later, her friend Buster Collins introduces her to author Tony Blake. Gerry loves Tony's book, Obey That Impulse, and finds him attractive as well. Practicing what he preaches, Tony immediately proposes marriage. Gerry just laughs, but together they have a lot of fun acting out Tony's theory, and she soon realizes that she loves and wants to marry him. First, though, she feels she must tell him about her affair with Jim despite dire warnings from her Aunt Kate. Although he's upset by the news, Tony still wants to marry her.

The next day, Gerry's sister Joan arrives home from school in France, where, unknown to Gerry, she has fallen in love with Jim. When Gerry finds out, she warns Jim to stay away from her sister, but he doesn't take the situation seriously and invites everyone to his parents’ house party. Initially, Gerry refuses to go, but when she finds out that business will prevent Tony from attending, she decides to go after all and keep an eye on Joan. Desperate to break Joan's engagement, Gerry first pretends to be a little crazy. When this doesn't work, she pretends she is still in love with Jim. While the two of them are alone together, she signals to Joan for help by singing a special song. Joan comes to her aid only to see Gerry and Jim embracing. Unfortunately, so does Tony, who has arrived at the last minute. Heartbroken, Gerry returns home, where Aunt Kate convinces her to pursue Tony who is sailing for Europe. After she leaves, Tony shows up at her apartment, saying he loves Gerry and wants to get back together with her. Aunt Kate tells him to go find her at the boat. Gerry sneaks on the boat; Tony arrives and they meet. Since there are no free cabins, Tony offers his and asks the captain to marry them immediately so they can share it.

== Cast (in credits order) ==
- Gloria Swanson as Geraldine "Gerry" Trent
- Ben Lyon as Tony Blake
- Monroe Owsley as Jim Woodward
- Barbara Kent as Joan Trent
- Arthur Lake as Buster Collins
- Maude Eburne as Aunt Kate
- Henry Kolker as Mr. Woodward
- Nella Walker as Mrs. Woodward

== Critical reception ==
In May 1931 in The New York Times, film critic Mordaunt Hall gave Indiscreet a mixed review:

It may have its off moments so far as the few serious incidents are concerned, but when it stoops to farce, there is no denying its jollity ... on the whole, it is a well-worked out entertainment, wherein gusts of merriment cause one to overlook its occasional flaws ... Now and again the film sobers up, but the director and the authors have solved a way of inoculating it with further mirth, and even at the end there is a streak of fun that is almost Chaplinesque.
