= Leo McCarey =

American film director (1898–1969)

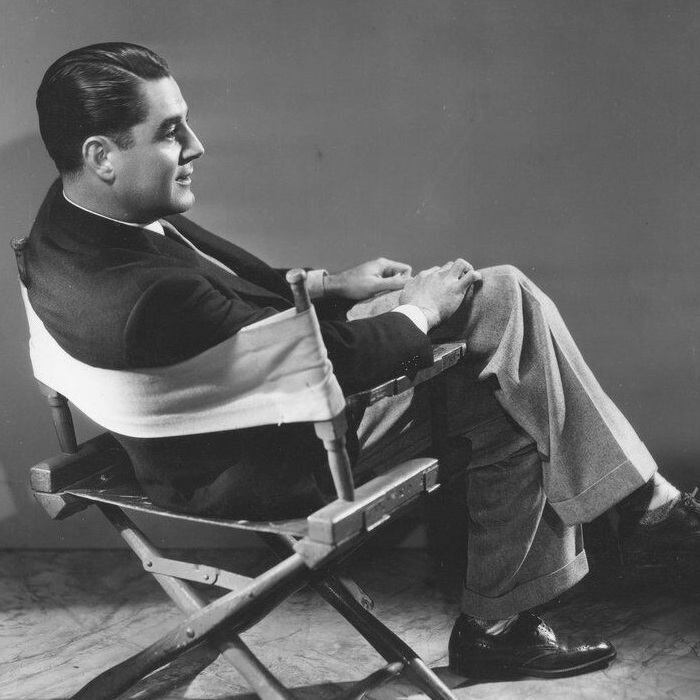
- McCarey on the set of Make Way for Tomorrow (1937)
- Born: Thomas Leo McCarey; October 3, 1898; Los Angeles, California, U.S.
- Died: July 5, 1969 (aged 70); Santa Monica, California, U.S.
- Resting place: Holy Cross Cemetery, Culver City
- Education: USC Gould School of Law
- Occupations: Director; producer; screenwriter
- Political party: Republican
- Spouse: Stella Martin (m. 1920) (1894-1987)
- Children: 1
- Relatives: Ray McCarey (brother)

Thomas Leo McCarey (October 3, 1898 – July 5, 1969) was an American film director, screenwriter, and producer. He was involved in nearly 200 films, including the critically acclaimed Duck Soup, Make Way for Tomorrow, The Awful Truth, Going My Way, The Bells of St. Mary's, My Son John, and An Affair to Remember. Nine of his films were selected for preservation in the United States National Film Registry by the Library of Congress as being "culturally, historically or aesthetically significant."

While focusing mainly on screwball comedies during the 1930s, McCarey turned towards producing more socially conscious and overtly religious films during the 1940s, ultimately finding success and acclaim in both genres. McCarey was one of the most popular and established comedy directors of the pre-World War II era.

== Life and career ==
Born in Los Angeles, California, McCarey attended St. Joseph's Catholic School and Los Angeles High School. His father was Thomas J. McCarey, whom the Los Angeles Times called "the greatest fight promoter in the world." Leo McCarey would later make a boxing comedy with Harold Lloyd called The Milky Way (1936).

McCarey graduated from the University of Southern California law school and besides the law tried mining, boxing, and songwriting before becoming an assistant director to Tod Browning in 1919. It was McCarey's boyhood friend, the actor and future fellow director David Butler, who referred him to Browning. Browning convinced McCarey, despite his photogenic looks, to work on the creative side as a writer rather than as an actor. McCarey then honed his skills at the Hal Roach Studios. Roach had hired him as a gagman in 1923, after McCarey had impressed him with his sense of humor following a handball game at a sports club.

McCarey initially wrote gags for the Our Gang series and other studio stars, then produced and directed shorts including two-reelers with Charley Chase. Chase would, in fact, become McCarey's mentor. Upon the comedian's death in 1940, McCarey was quoted as saying, "Whatever success I have had or may have, I owe to his help because he taught me all I know." The two men were especially compatible, as they both enjoyed a side hobby trying to write popular songs.

While at Roach, McCarey, according to later interviews, cast Stan Laurel and Oliver Hardy together and guided development of their onscreen characters, thus creating one of the most enduring comedy teams of all time. He only officially appeared as director of the duo's shorts We Faw Down (1928), Liberty (1929) and Wrong Again (1929), but wrote many screenplays and supervised the direction by others. By 1929, he was vice-president of production for the studio. Less well known from this period are the shorts he directed with Max Davidson when Roach put together the Irish-American McCarey with the Jewish-American actor for a series of "dialect comedies." They were rediscovered in recent years after their 1994 exhibition at the Giornate del Cinema Muto in Pordenone Italy.

In the sound era, McCarey focused on feature film direction, working with many of the biggest stars of the era including Gloria Swanson (Indiscreet, 1931), Eddie Cantor (The Kid From Spain, 1932), the Marx Brothers (Duck Soup, 1933), W.C. Fields (Six of a Kind, 1934), and Mae West (Belle of the Nineties, 1934). A series of six films at Paramount came to a crashing halt with his production of Make Way for Tomorrow in 1937. While the story of an elderly couple who have to be separated for economic and family reasons during the Depression was not without humor in its treatment, the results were too unpopular at the box office and the director was let go. Nonetheless, the film was recognized early on for its importance by being selected for the permanent collection of the recently formed Museum of Modern Art in New York City. In later years it became canonical, and even considered by some as McCarey's masterpiece, due to perceptive champions such as Bertrand Tavernier, Charles Silver and Robin Wood.

Invited to Columbia later in 1937, McCarey earned his first Academy Award for Best Director for The Awful Truth, with Irene Dunne and Cary Grant. It was a screwball comedy that launched Grant's unique screen persona, largely concocted by McCarey (Grant copied many of McCarey's mannerisms). Along with the similarity in their names, McCarey and Cary Grant shared a physical resemblance, making mimicking McCarey's intonations and expressions even easier for Grant. As writer/director Peter Bogdanovich notes, "After The Awful Truth, when it came to light comedy, there was Cary Grant and then everyone else was an also-ran."

After the success of The Awful Truth, McCarey could have become a Columbia contract director with a certain independence, like Frank Capra. Instead, he went his own way, selling the story that would become The Cowboy And The Lady to Sam Goldwyn and then moving to RKO for three films. A car accident in 1940 prevented him from directing My Favorite Wife, a kind of follow up to The Awful Truth with the same two stars, so it was turned over to Garson Kanin though McCarey worked on some of the editing. Another McCarey project for RKO, They Knew What They Wanted, was also turned over to Kanin.

McCarey was a devout Roman Catholic and was deeply concerned with social issues. During the 1940s, his work became more serious and his politics more conservative. In 1944 he directed Going My Way, a story about an enterprising priest, the youthful Father Chuck O'Malley, played by Bing Crosby, for which he won his second Best Director Oscar and Crosby won a Best Actor Oscar. McCarey's share in the profits from this smash hit gave him the highest reported income in the U.S. for 1944, and its follow-up, The Bells of St. Mary's (1945), which paired Crosby with Ingrid Bergman and was made by McCarey's newly formed production company, was similarly successful. According to Paul Harrill in Great Directors, McCarey acknowledged that the film is largely based on his aunt, Sister Mary Benedict, who died of typhoid. McCarey testified as a friendly witness early on in the hearings of the Un-American Activities Committee which was investigating Communist activity in Hollywood.

The public reacted negatively to some of his films after World War II; for instance, his anti-communist film My Son John (1952) failed at the box office. But five years later, he co-wrote, produced, and directed An Affair to Remember. The film, starring Cary Grant and Deborah Kerr, was a remake (with precisely the same script) of his 1939 film Love Affair with Irene Dunne and Charles Boyer. In 1993, the hugely popular romantic comedy film Sleepless In Seattle by Nora Ephron made such frequent references to An Affair To Remember that it gave the older film a whole new lease on life in revivals, cable TV, and video, with the result that it is probably McCarey's most popular and easily accessible film today. He followed this hit with Rally Round the Flag, Boys! (1958), a comedy starring Paul Newman and Joanne Woodward. His last picture was the poorly received Satan Never Sleeps (1962), which, like My Son John, was a stern critique of Communism.

Auteurist critic Andrew Sarris has said that McCarey "represents a principle of improvisation in the history of the American film." Through most of his career, McCarey's filming method, rooted in the silents, was to drastically alter the story ideas, bits of business, and dialogue in the scripts previously provided to the studios and the actors. He would usually sit at a piano and doodle as the sometimes exasperated crew waited for inspiration. As Bing Crosby said about Going My Way: "I think probably 75 percent of each day's shooting was made up on the set by Leo."

While this technique was responsible for a certain awkwardness and some rough edges in the finished works, many of McCarey's scenes had a freshness and spontaneity lacking in the typical mainstream Hollywood cinema. He was not the only director of his time to work this way: fellow comedy directors Gregory La Cava, Howard Hawks and George Stevens – the last also a Roach graduate – were known for their use of improvisation on the set.

French director Jean Renoir once paid the great tribute of saying that "Leo McCarey understood people better than any other Hollywood director."

== Death ==
Leo McCarey died on July 5, 1969, aged 70, from emphysema. He was interred in the Holy Cross Cemetery in Culver City, California. His younger brother, director Ray McCarey, had died 21 years earlier. In 1978, Leo McCarey's production records, including scripts, budgets and correspondence were donated to the Charles Feldman Library at the American Film Institute in Beverly Hills.

== Filmography ==
=== Films ===
McCarey's 1939 Academy Award nominated film Love Affair (full film)

- Society Secrets (1921)
- All Wet (1924 short)
- Outdoor Pijamas (1924 short)
- Isn't Life Terrible? (1925 short)
- Long Fliv the King (1926 short)
- Mighty Like a Moose (1926 short)
- Sugar Daddies (1927 short)
- Should Married Men Go Home? (1928 short), also writer
- We Faw Down (1928 short)
- Liberty (1929 short), also writer
- Wrong Again (1929 short)
- The Sophomore (1929)
- Red Hot Rhythm (1929)
- Wild Company (1930)
- Part Time Wife (1930)
- Let's Go Native (1930)
- Indiscreet (1931)
- The Kid from Spain (1932)
- Duck Soup (1933)
- Six of a Kind (1934)
- Belle of the Nineties (1934)
- Ruggles of Red Gap (1935)
- The Milky Way (1936)
- Make Way for Tomorrow (1937), also producer
- The Awful Truth (1937), also producer
- Love Affair (1939), also producer
- Once Upon a Honeymoon (1942), also writer and uncredited producer
- Going My Way (1944), also producer
- The Bells of St. Mary's (1945), also producer and writer
- Good Sam (1948), also producer and writer
- My Son John (1952)
- An Affair to Remember (1957), also producer and writer
- Rally Round the Flag, Boys! (1958), also producer
- Satan Never Sleeps (1962), also producer

=== Other work ===
- Habeas Corpus (1928 short), supervisor
- Pass the Gravy (1928 short), supervisor
- Big Business (1929 short), supervisor
- The Cowboy and the Lady (1938), storywriter
- My Favorite Wife (1940), producer and storywriter

== Academy Awards ==
Wins

- 1937 Best Director: The Awful Truth
- 1944 Best Director: Going My Way
- 1944 Best Picture: Going My Way
- 1944 Best Writing (Original Story): Going My Way

Nominations

- 1939 Best Writing (Original Story): Love Affair
- 1940 Best Writing (Original Story): My Favorite Wife
- 1945 Best Director: The Bells of St. Mary's
- 1952 Best Writing (Motion Picture Story): My Son John
- 1957 Best Music, Song: "An Affair To Remember" from An Affair to Remember
