= Matthieu Bareyre =

French film director

- Born: 1986 (age 39–40); France
- Occupation: film director
- Years active: 2012–present

Matthieu Bareyre (born 1986 in France) is a French film director.

== Biography ==
Matthieu Bareyre, born in 1986, is a French author, director, and editor. His debut feature film, "L'Époque," received the Best First Film award in 2019 from the Film Critics Syndicate. According to Vodkaster(french magazine), he is among the 20 filmmakers to watch in the coming decade. He directed his first film L'Epoque in 2012

== Filmography ==
=== Short movies ===
- 2015: Nocturnes (Nights) documentary, 48'
- 2016: On ne sait jamais ce qu'on filme, 2'
- 2019: Réveillez-vous, L'Époque-Documents #1, 1'
- 2019: La Nouvelle Année, L'Époque-Documents #2, 4'
- 2019: Hommage à Notre-Dame, L'Époque-Documents #3, 1'
- 2020: Pull up un Paris, L'Époque-Documents #4, 5'
- 2020: Histoire de Du Sale ! co-réalisé avec Marion Siéfert, Documentaire, 55'
- 2020: L'Époque - Uncut #1, 3'
- 2020: L'Époque - Uncut #2, 5'
- 2020: La Passion de Soall, L'Époque-Documents #5, 10'
- 2021: Enivrez-vous, 1'
- 2022: Isn't it a pity, 10'.
- 2023: In absentia, 5'

=== Features movies ===
- 2019: L'Époque, 90'
- 2022: Le Journal d'une femme nwar, 104'

== Distinctions ==
- Festival Cinéma du Réel 2015: Price of "Patrimoine et de l'immatériel pour" Nocturnes
- Festival Cinéma du Réel 2015: Special Mention of French institute for Nocturnes
- 71st Locarno Film Festival, 2018: Label Europa Cinema for L'Époque
- 71st Locarno Film Festival, 2018: Special mention at Rose in L'Époque by the jury of Cineasti del presente
