= My Son John =

1952 American film by Leo McCarey

- Theatrical release poster
- Directed by: Leo McCarey
- Written by: Myles Connolly; Leo McCarey; John Lee Mahin
- Produced by: Leo McCarey
- Starring: Helen Hayes; Van Heflin; Robert Walker; Dean Jagger
- Cinematography: Harry Stradling
- Edited by: Marvin Coil
- Music by: Robert Emmett Dolan
- Production company: Rainbow Productions
- Distributed by: Paramount Pictures
- Release date: April 8, 1952
- Running time: 122 minutes
- Country: United States
- Language: English

My Son John is a 1952 American political drama film directed by Leo McCarey and starring Helen Hayes, Van Heflin, Robert Walker, and Dean Jagger. Walker plays the title character, a middle-class college graduate, whom his parents suspect may be a communist spy.

The strongly anticommunist film, produced during the height of McCarthyism, received an Oscar nomination for Best Writing, Motion Picture Story. The nomination was later viewed as a possible attempt by the motion-picture industry to signal its loyalty to the ongoing anticommunist campaign. Retrospective reviews have characterized it as a propaganda film indicative of attitudes during the Second Red Scare.

My Son John was Walker's final role. He died in August 1951 before McCarey could reshoot several scenes. The director had to make minor script adjustments, use a Walker look-alike, and mix in previous clips of the actor in order to complete the film.

== Plot ==
In uniform, Chuck and Ben Jefferson, strapping blonds who played high-school football, attend Sunday Mass with their parents before leaving for army service in Korea. Their older brother John sends regrets that he cannot join their farewell dinner because of his work for the federal government in Washington, D.C.

A week later, John pays a surprise visit to his parents—his devoutly Catholic mother Lucille and American Legionnaire father Dan. In a conversation with them and their parish priest, John uses humor to make provocative statements and his attitude is resented. He spends hours with one of his college professors, leaving his parents feeling shortchanged. Anxious about his son's behavior, Dan gets into a car crash with John's college friend Stedman. Dan questions John's loyalty after he mocks his father's anticommunist speech to the Legion and tries to rewrite it. When Dan accuses his son of being a communist and threatens him, John proclaims his loyalty by swearing on his mother's Bible. Dan refuses to believe his son and, following an argument about the veracity of the Bible, beats him in a drunken rage and tears John's trousers.

The next morning, John asks Lucille to retrieve a pair of his trousers from the church clothing drive; she finds an unknown key in one of the pockets. She meets Stedman who informs her that he is an FBI agent investigating John. She has a conversation with Dan who is feeling remorseful after last night's incident. She defends her husband saying, "You've got more wisdom than all of us because you listen to your heart." When she returns the trousers to her son, she mentions the importance of the FBI's work to perform "routine loyalty checks" and "to investigate and protect us." Lucille learns from John that the key she found is for an apartment of a female Soviet spy with whom John admits to being "quite intimate". Lucille refuses to accept John's assurances that he has been engaging in legitimate activities. She begs him to confess to the FBI so that she won't have to turn him in. But her pleading with her son is to no avail. She collapses on a sofa in exhaustion and says to Stedman, "Take him away, take him away. He has to be...punished." John points out that the courts will refuse to accept any testimony she offers since she is suffering from a mental illness, which Stedman accuses John of causing.

Stedman advises John that he should "use whatever free will you have left to make your own decision.... Give up, name names." John tries to flee the country on a flight to Lisbon, but at the last minute finds faith in God, repents his actions, and decides to turn himself in to Stedman. However, before John can do so, he is shot by communist agents. While dying, he tells Stedman that he earlier recorded a confession. Stedman plays the recording at John's college commencement exercises. Later at church, Dan consoles a distraught Lucille, saying that John's actions will eventually be forgotten, but that his words will be remembered.

== Cast ==
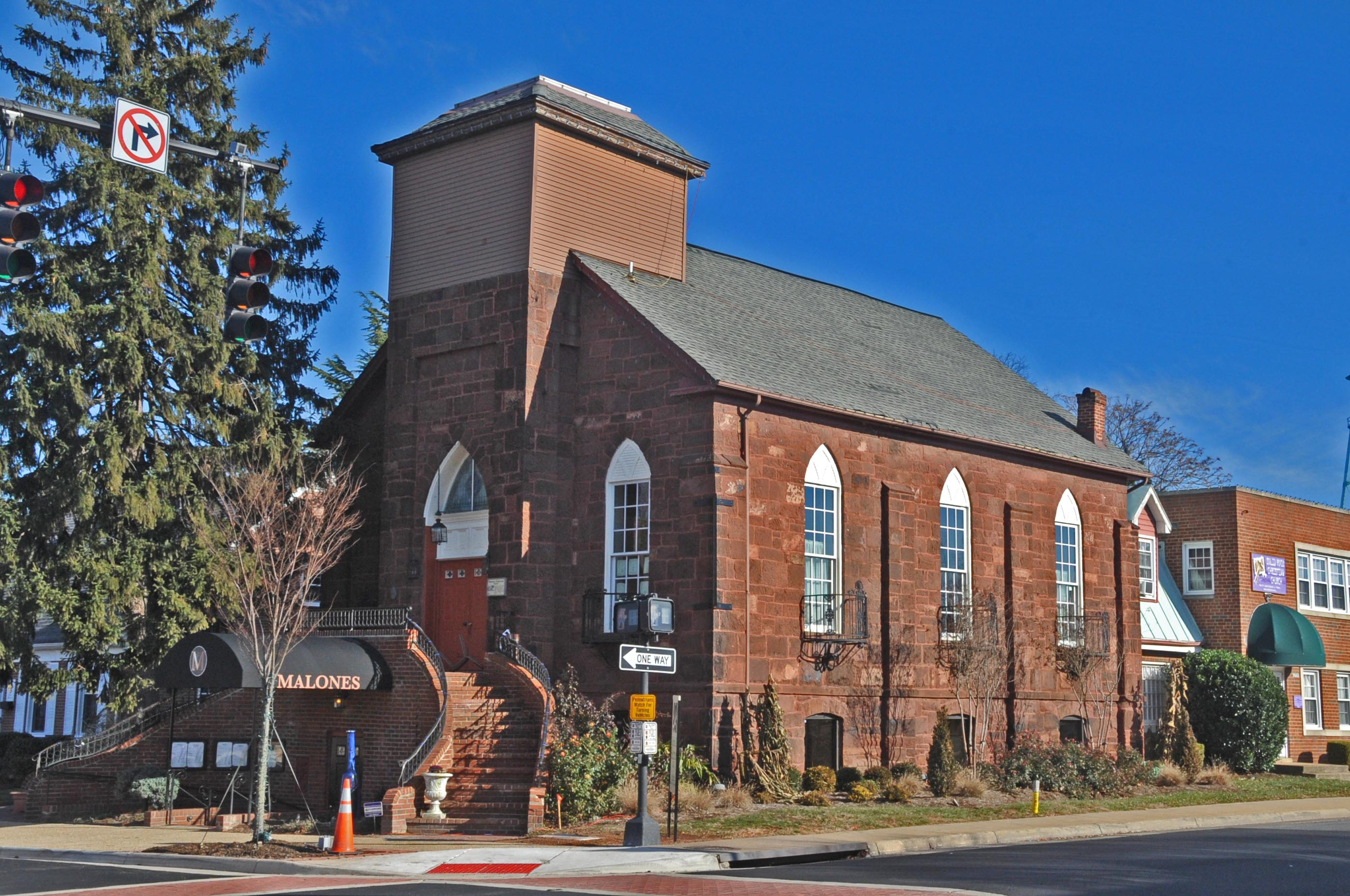
Church in Manassas, Virginia featured in the film

- Helen Hayes as Lucille Jefferson
- Van Heflin as FBI Agent Stedman
- Dean Jagger as Dan Jefferson
- Robert Walker as John Jefferson
- Minor Watson as Dr. Carver
- Frank McHugh as Father O'Dowd
- Richard Jaeckel as Chuck Jefferson
- James Young as Ben Jefferson
- Todd Karns as Bedford, FBI agent (uncredited)

== Production ==
The film was based on an idea by Leo McCarey and developed into a script by John Lee Mahin. Paramount built interest in the project by reporting the casting of each role, beginning with the news in December 1950 that Helen Hayes was considering it for her return to motion pictures after 17 years away from the film industry. The details of the story were kept secret while it was first described in one news report as "a contemporary drama about the relationship between a mother and son, described by McCarey as 'highly emotional but with much humor'." Hedda Hopper reported that the script "has gotten raves from everyone who's read it."

Despite McCarey's "close-mouthed silence" for two months and a public warning to Hayes not to discuss the plot, the trade papers said, "word has gotten around Hollywood with the authority such wisps of information always have that the son ... is a traitor to his country—an agent of Communist espionage." Daily Variety reported that Hayes, mirroring certain current events, would shoot her son in the film and be tried for his murder. Hayes called it "a natural, human part" for which she did not have to worry about her appearance. She denied that the film's message attracted her to the project: "I just like the character and the story. I am deadly set against messages as the prime factor for taking a part. But I do feel the picture is a very exciting comment on a certain phase of our living today."

John Lee Mahin said he agreed to write the film if they downplayed the anticommunist aspect and made the film more about a mother's concern for her son. He claims his script was rewritten by Myles Connelly. "McCarey was a brilliant man who let the Communists drive him absolutely crazy," said Mahin. "He actually went crazy."

In February 1951, Robert Walker was borrowed from MGM to play the title role. That same month, Dean Jagger signed onto the project. Van Heflin joined the cast in April 1951.

Ten days into shooting, the plot's undisclosed elements continued to garner press coverage. McCarey denied that the script was the Alger Hiss story and insisted it had a "happy ending". He said:

It's about a mother and father who struggled and slaved. They had no education. They put all their money into higher education for their sons. But one of the kids gets too bright. It poses the problem–how bright can you get?

He takes up a lot of things including atheism. The mother knows only two books–her Bible and her cookbook. But who's brighter in the end-- the mother or the son?

It's such a fragile little point, but so is nuclear fission. It's not bad sometimes to have a small point and get the most out of it.

The original graduation ceremony scene was filmed with Van Heflin as agent Stedman delivering John's speech at the Wilshire-Ebell Theater in Los Angeles. The script was then altered so that John would deliver the speech himself. However, Robert Walker died unexpectedly on August 28, 1951, only a couple days after he recorded the audio for the speech. Although principal photography on the film was over, McCarey had decided he wanted to reshoot several scenes. With Walker unavailable, the script was changed so that his character would be killed before the graduation ceremony, with a shot of Walker dying spliced in from his role in Alfred Hitchcock's Strangers on a Train (1951). McCarey filmed actor Jon Keating, who resembled Walker, recording the speech in a darkened office with his back to the camera. The shots of the audience from the original ending were used in the final film, but with new shots of the recording being played from an empty lectern.

Filming took place in Washington, D.C., Manassas, Virginia and Hollywood.

== Reception ==
The picture was not a success at the box office. It grossed under $1 million and failed to make the list of the top 90 pictures of the year as compiled by Variety.

Bosley Crowther wrote in his review for The New York Times that the film represented its time perfectly in that it "corresponds with the present public ferment of angry resentment and fear" and that it is "a picture so strongly dedicated to the purpose of the American anti-Communist purge that it seethes with the sort of emotionalism and illogic that is characteristic of so much thinking these days." He wrote that allowing a mother to condemn her son based on flimsy evidence shows the film's "hot emotional nature" and that its endorsement of bigotry and argument for religious conformity would "cause a thoughtful person to feel a shudder of apprehension." While praising all of the actors, Crowther regretted the film's "snide anti-intellectual stance." Soon after the film opened, Crowther noted that My Son John provided an ironic contrast to the public outcry about communist subversion in the film industry on the part of the American Legion and the Catholic War Veterans. He wrote:

Amid all this turmoil, an irony is that one of the latest films from Hollywood, My Son John, is a passionate endorsement of the relentless pursuit of American Communists to the extent that the acceptance of "guilt by association" is espoused. Helen Hayes is the star of this picture as a mother who condemns her own son when she learns that he has been consorting with a girl who is charged with being a spy. The irony is that the sort of cultural vigilantism that is currently being forced on Hollywood is made heroic in the person of Dean Jagger, who plays an American Legionnaire.

Other critics underscored the cultural attitudes behind the film's politics. In the New York Herald Tribune, Ogden Reid, later a congressman, wrote: "McCarey's picture of how America ought to be is so frightening, so speciously argued, so full of warnings against an intelligent solution to the problem that it boomerangs upon its own cause." The New Yorker wrote that the film advised the public to "cut out thinking, obey their superiors blindly, regard all political suspects as guilty without trial, revel in joy through strength, and pay more attention to football." Alton Cook of the New York World-Telegram wrote that Dan Jefferson "would have most of the population endlessly undergoing loyalty tests" and that his "slogans ... have a strong flavor of fascism."

Some critics appreciated that the film located the ideological conflict within a complex set of family relations, with father and son competing for the same woman's affection, while noting how John is not just an intellectual, but "an unathletic, sexually ambiguous intellectual", both "sullen" and "slick". Others interpreted John's character as having homosexual traits, and seeing the film as part of the "Red Scare sensibility" which linked distrust of intellectuals with fear of homosexuality.

In response to the negative reviews from New York critics, McCarey told Motion Picture magazine that he felt mistreated and hurt. Conservatives in the U.S. rallied to McCarey's defense. The Catholic Press Institute unanimously endorsed a resolution praising the film; Senator Karl Mundt entered a statement into the Congressional Record calling it "undoubtedly the greatest and most stirring pro-American motion picture of the last decade. ... It should be seen by the people of every American home." Hearst newspaper columnist George Sokolsky wrote that he saw My Son John twice, and "I could not restrain my tears on both occasions."

A month after the film opened, the Catholic Press Association awarded McCarey its 1952 Literary Prize for "exemplification of Christian, Catholic principles," citing his work on My Son John and other films.

In 1998, Jonathan Rosenbaum of the Chicago Reader included the film in his unranked list of the best American films not included on the AFI Top 100.

== Legacy ==
Patricia Bosworth, writing about a festival of blacklist-era films in 1992, characterized My Son John as "hysterical" and "the anti-Communist movie to end all anti-Communist movies." Nora Sayre called it "by far the most feverish of the anti-Communist films". She was troubled by what she perceived as the film's anti-intellectual message:

Before the mother convicts her son, the movie has spelled out the twin perils that he personifies: education and the intellect. Hayes remarks that he's always been studious—"he has more degrees than a thermometer"—and that he's closer to his "highbrow professor" than to his "low-brow" parents. The father keeps sarcastically repeating that he himself is "not bright"—thereby establishing his moral superiority to his corrupt son. Finally, it's stressed that the son's years in college perverted his mind and sucked him into the Party.

Some have surmised that McCarey had lost his hallmark deep sympathy for his characters by the 1950s. Stuart Klawans wrote in The New York Times in 2002 that "gentleness itself had become a sin." In his view, McCarey's "exquisitely sensitive" handling of the mother-son relationship in the first part of the film was undercut by Myles Connolly, a screenwriter known for writing many a "bullying speech" for Frank Capra. Klawans hears Connolly's tone in the film's finale, a commencement address warning the young against liberalism.

J. Hoberman noted the film's dual personality, writing that it "aspires to the warmth of a domestic comedy while remaining tendentious to the core, relentlessly unfunny and starkly melodramatic."
