= Liberty (1929 film) =

1929 American film by Leo McCarey

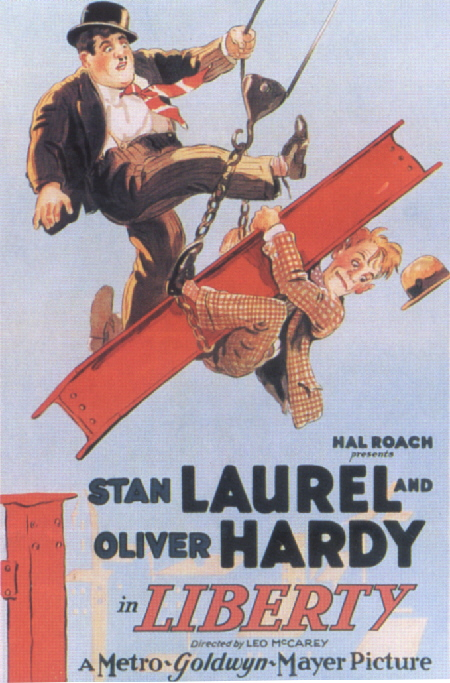
- Theatrical release poster
- Directed by: Leo McCarey
- Written by: Leo McCarey; H.M. Walker
- Produced by: Hal Roach
- Starring: Stan Laurel; Oliver Hardy; Tom Kennedy; Sam Lufkin; James Finlayson; Jack Hill; Harry Bernard; Jean Harlow; Ed Brandenburg
- Cinematography: George Stevens
- Edited by: Richard C. Currier
- Distributed by: Metro-Goldwyn-Mayer
- Release date: January 26, 1929
- Running time: 20 min.
- Country: United States
- Languages: Synchronized Sound; English (Intertitles)

Liberty is a synchronized sound short subject film, directed by Leo McCarey and starring comedy duo Laurel and Hardy. While the film has no audible dialog, it was released with a synchronized orchestral musical score with sound effects. It was released by Metro-Goldwyn-Mayer on January 26, 1929.

In the film, two men escape from prison and quickly swap their prison attire for street clothes. Later, they attempt to exchange trousers behind a seafood shop. One of them harbors a crab from the shop in his new pants. When their flight causes to ascend to the top floor of an unfinished building, they continue to have problems with the persistent crab.

== Plot ==
Liberty (1929)

Stan and Ollie, fugitives from prison, find themselves pursued by a police officer armed with a shotgun. Their escape leads them to encounter two accomplices in a car, where they hurriedly swap their prison attire for street clothes, accidentally exchanging trousers in the process. As they discard their uniforms out of the car window, they draw the attention of a motorcycle police officer, narrowly evading detection.

Their quest to exchange trousers leads them through various encounters: an alley where they startle a smoking cop and alarm a passerby; behind crates with another policeman nearby; and behind a seafood shop, where Stan's trousers inadvertently harbor a crab, causing him considerable discomfort. In their haste, Ollie accidentally topples a record player outside a music shop, inciting the ire of the owner.

Their flight continues to a construction site, where they ascend to the top floor of an unfinished building, navigating precarious girders while contending with the persistent crab. Despite numerous close calls, they eventually succeed in exchanging trousers and make their descent, narrowly avoiding a fatal fall. However, their escape inadvertently results in the unfortunate squashing of a police officer by an elevator.

== Cast ==
- Stan Laurel as Stan
- Oliver Hardy as Ollie
- Tom Kennedy as Construction Worker
- Sam Lufkin as Getaway Driver
- James Finlayson as Store Keeper
- Jack Hill as Police Officer
- Harry Bernard
- Jean Harlow as girl in cab
- Ed Brandenburg
