= Good Sam (1948 film) =

1948 film by Leo McCarey

- Directed by: Leo McCarey
- Screenplay by: Ken Englund
- Story by: Leo McCarey; John D. Klorer
- Produced by: Leo McCarey
- Starring: Gary Cooper; Ann Sheridan; Edmund Lowe
- Cinematography: George Barnes
- Edited by: James C. McKay
- Music by: Robert Emmett Dolan
- Production company: Rainbow Productions
- Distributed by: RKO Radio Pictures
- Release date: September 1, 1948
- Running time: 130 minutes (original release); 114 minutes (reissue)
- Country: United States
- Language: English
- Box office: $2,950,000 (US rentals)

Good Sam is a 1948 American romantic comedy-drama film starring Gary Cooper as a Good Samaritan who is helpful to others at the expense of his own family. The film was directed by Leo McCarey and produced by McCarey's production company, Rainbow Productions. It received mixed reviews, with critics alternately liking and disliking the film based on whether they viewed it as a serious story or a spoof. The film was one of the top box-office draws of 1948, grossing $2.95 million.

== Plot ==
Sam Clayton is too good for his own good. A sermon by Rev. Daniels persuades him to help others in every way he can, including his wife Lu's good-for-nothing brother, Claude, who's been living with them rent-free for six months, and their neighbors the Butlers, who need a car for a vacation when theirs breaks down.

Sam is a department store manager whose boss, H.C. Borden, wants him to sell more and socialize less. Sam's a shoulder for clerk Shirley Mae to cry on when her romance breaks up. He also gives a $5,000 loan, without his wife's knowledge, to Mr. and Mrs. Adams, who need it to save a gas station they bought.

Lu is fed up with Sam's generosity, particularly when he ends up paying for the Butlers' car repairs, then letting the mechanic come over for home-cooked meals. The last straw for Lu comes when she learns they have a chance to put a down payment on a new house, except Sam has lent their nest egg to the Adamses.

Sam is unhappy, too. He's annoyed with the Butlers, who have crashed his car and can't pay to fix it. He also wants Claude to move out. Shirley Mae's troubles come to his door after she overdoses on pills. Though the Adamses surprise him with a check for $6,000 to repay their loan, Sam uses some of the money to pay for the annual Christmas charity dinner after he is robbed of the money he collected from employees and the bank refuses to give him a loan. He ends up in a bar, drinking copiously. A Salvation Army marching band playing Christmas songs brings him back home. There the bank manager promises that he will receive the loan he asked for, and Borden surprises him with a promotion to vice-president of the store.

== Cast ==
- Gary Cooper as Samuel R. Clayton
- Ann Sheridan as Lucille Clayton
- Ray Collins as Reverend Daniels
- Edmund Lowe as H.C. Borden
- Joan Lorring as Shirley Mae
- Clinton Sundberg as Mr. Nelson
- Minerva Urecal as Mrs. Nelson
- Louise Beavers as Chloe, the Claytons' maid
- Ruth Roman as Ruthie
- Dick Ross as Claude
- Lora Lee Michel as Lulu Clayton
- Bobby Dolan Jr. as Butch Clayton

== Production ==
=== Development ===
Good Sam was written by Ken Englund based on a story by Leo McCarey and John D. Klorer. Sinclair Lewis was asked to work on the script but refused, stating: "[A] man who tried to lead in our times the life of an apostle would be an idiot and would be considered by others to be one".

=== Casting ===
McCarey's production company, Rainbow Productions, borrowed Ann Sheridan from Warner Bros., to play the wife of Gary Cooper's character. According to the American Film Institute, Cooper's career was "floundering" at the time, and while he was filming Good Sam he signed a "significant contract" with Warner Bros.

For the scene in which a Salvation Army marching band accompanies Cooper's drunken character home, director McCarey assembled a 25-piece band composed of students from several high schools in the Los Angeles area.

=== Filming ===
The film was shot in Los Angeles from August 4 to October 1947. In January 1948, McCarey reportedly filmed additional scenes to provide alternative endings for the film. Preview audiences were then asked to state which of the two endings they preferred. The unused ending is not known.

Interior scenes of the church were modeled after the interior of the city's St. James Episcopal Church. The Rev. J. Herbert Smith, pastor of All Saints' Episcopal Church of Beverly Hills, was a technical advisor.

Filming was interrupted by Cooper's appearance as a friendly witness before the House Un-American Activities Committee on October 23, 1947.

== Release ==
The film was released on September 1, 1948. The original 130-minute cut is stored at the Library of Congress. The film was reissued with a runtime of 112 to 114 minutes.

The film grossed $2.95 million in domestic and international receipts, giving it a ranking of no. 23 on the list of highest grossing films of 1948.

== Critical reception ==
Critical reviews were mixed.

Bosley Crowther of The New York Times evaluated the film positively, calling it "a mischievous sort of satire" and pointing out that the main character, who behaves like a saint towards everyone, should not be taken seriously. Crowrher wrote: “The principal danger in this picture is that people will take it seriously as a nobly intended tribute to the Good Samaritan type. And that is understandable, for the story is such a cliché that it may not be easily distinguished as an outright travesty. ... But if you'll realize at the outset that the hero of this comic tale is not supposed to be taken as a proper example at all but is really something of a lampoon—a spoof of a popular movie type—then you'll certainly get more pleasure out of the antics than if you don't. Crowther praised Cooper's performance as a spoof of "every do-gooder that he has played since Mr. Deeds, plus a couple of memorable do-gooders that Jimmy Stewart has played". He also lauded Sheridan's performance for cueing the reader to the fact the film should not be taken seriously, writing: "As a matter of fact, it is the lovely and willful sarcasm in her approach—the non-Pollyannaism—that keys the whole purpose of the film". He called McCarey's staging of the interactions between the main character and his wife, and with others, "bright, explosive—and absurd".

A 1950 review by the Narandera Argus and Riverina Advertiser of New South Wales also praised the film as "smashing in its comic effect", "heartwarming and human".

The Santa Cruz Sentinel gave the picture a weak nod, writing: "The film has several good laughs, and no doubt some people will find it amusing and even philosophical. Others will find it episodic, confused and even embarrassing". Variety blamed Cooper's performance for slowing the film's pacing, due to his "languidness and too obviously premeditated performance in a pic that in itself is unusually long".

Contemporary reviews also noted the miscasting of Sheridan, who typically played "sassy" characters but in this film was cast as a "bland" housewife. Variety felt the stylishly-outfitted Sheridan looked more at home "in a Christian Dior salon" than in the kitchen cooking eggs.

In 1982, The RKO Story criticized McCarey's coaching of the actors for "bungling" the potential satirical comedy, resulting in Cooper giving "one of the most dopey, insipid performances of his long career".

Writing in 2001, Cooper biographer Jeffrey Meyers calls Good Sam "one of Cooper's worst [films]"; a "labored, repetitive, one-joke movie". Comparing it to Cooper's "naïve and idealistic" performance in Mr. Deeds Goes to Town, Meyers describes Cooper's acting in this film as "merely goofy". Meyers quotes a Cue magazine review which chided Cooper for overacting, writing: "Mr. Cooper is now a grown man and his boyish bashfulness, sheepish grins, trembling lip and fluttering eyelids are actors' tricks he can surely do without"; Meyers blamed Cooper's maneuvers on the actor's efforts to "compensate for a poor script".

Among 21st-century critics. Leonard Maltin calls the film "an almost complete misfire" and a "lifeless comedy". PopMatters writes that the film “ ...balances comedy, pathos, and irony so freely within each scene that you don't know how the movie expects you to react. This ambiguity of affect marks the cinema of Leo McCarey. He's so fascinated by observing the nuances of human reactions, and how the emotions of different characters feed and counterpoint each other, that he lets scenes run on quite long; you get the feeling he'd just as soon they never end.

Writing for the CinePassion website, Fernando Croce on the other hand, asserts that "[t]he leisurely treatment allows for the flowering of digressions like Ida Moore's sketch of a wizened sly pixie or Dick Wessel's beautiful rendition of Edgar Kennedy's monumental slow-burn at the wheel of a bus".

As of December 2020, review aggregator Rotten Tomatoes rates the film 60 percent fresh.

== Adaptations ==
Good Sam was adapted for a September 25, 1950 presentation on Lux Radio Theatre starring Sheridan and Joel McCrea. It was also adapted for a 30-minute episode on Stars in the Air on March 13, 1952, starring Sheridan and David Wayne.

== Sources ==
- Jewell, Richard J.; Harbin, Vernon (1982). The RKO Story. Arlington House. ISBN 9780517546567.
- Meyers, Jeffrey (2001). Gary Cooper: American Hero. Rowman & Littlefield. ISBN 9780815411406.
