= Reza Farahmand =

Iranian film director (born 1978)

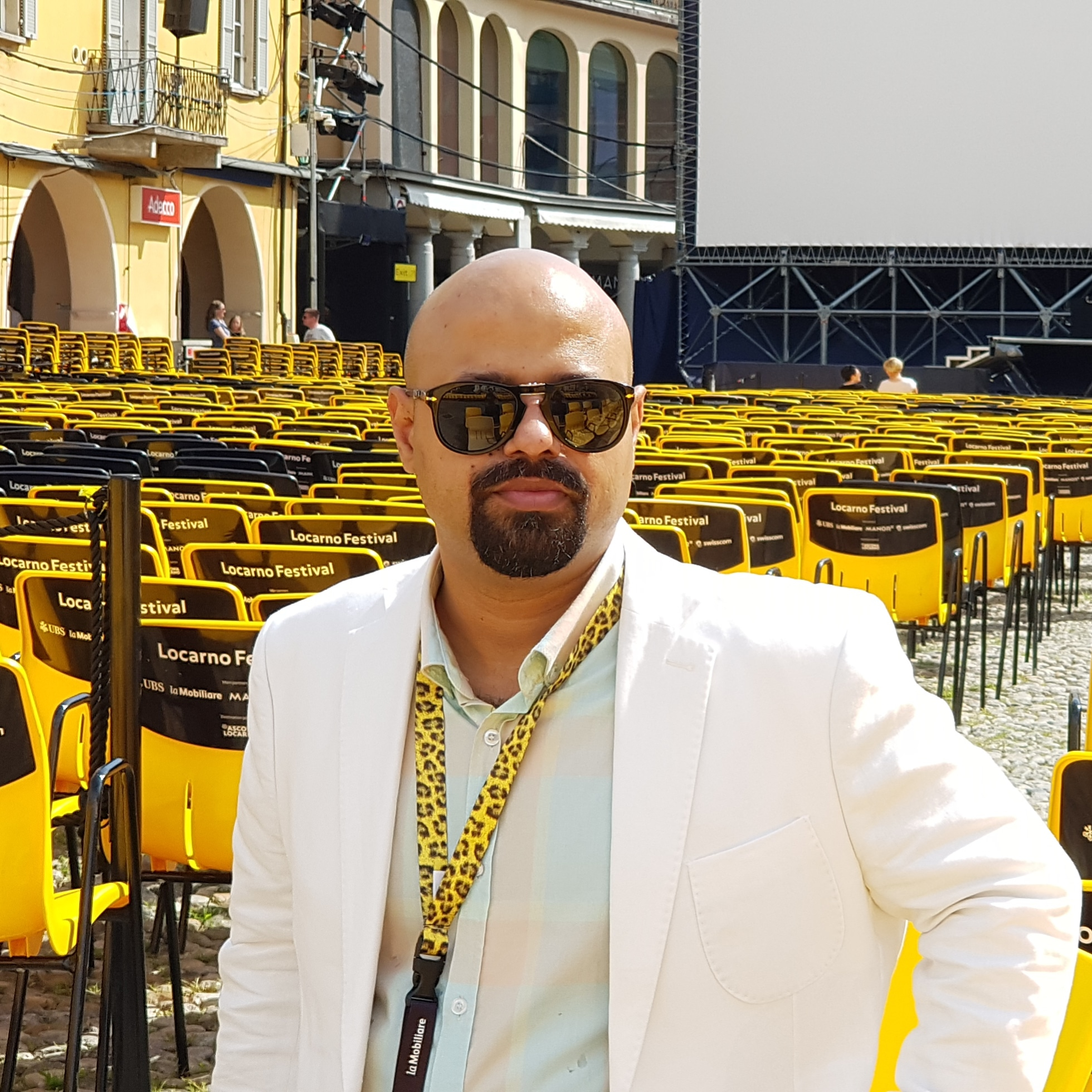
- Reza Farahmand at the Locarno Film Festival in 2019
- Born: c. 1978; Birjand, Iran
- Occupation: Film director

Reza Farahmand (Persian: رضا فرهمند; born c. 1978) is an Iranian film director, most known for documentary films.

== Films ==
- 2010: Climbing Room
- 2013: No Honking Please!
- 2014: Freedom (feature-length documentary co-directed with Kamil Soheili) - The film is about the cruelty of hunting of migratory birds in the wetlands of Fereydunkenar County using illegal bird trap nets.
- 2015: Swallow [Persook, پرسوک]
- 2015: Forgotten Childhood
- 2017: Women with Gunpowder Earrings [Zanani ba gooshvarehaye barooti] - In the film an Iraqi female journalist Noor Al Helli reports about Syrian and Iraqi refugee women and children from the families of ISIL.
- 2019: Copper Notes of a Dream [Notha -ye- mesi yek roya] - It was selected for the 13th Cinema Verite and for the Camden International Film Festival. The film chronicles a period in the life of Malook, a ten-year-old Palestinian refugee who lives in a ravaged area of Damascus. To finance the organization of a concert with professional musicians (he dreams of being a singer), he and his friends take the copper wiring from ruined buildings to sell. They write apologies on the walls in case the previous occupants ever return. Steve Dollar, who saw the documentary at Camden, commented in Filmmaker that "the story is as quietly heartbreaking as it is hopeful in the childrens' [sic] zest not only to abide but to transform the damaged world around them". The film was selected for the national competition at Cinema Verite, and was shown at the Olympia film festival in Greece.

== Awards ==
- Climbing Room : "Crystal Simurgh", the best short and mid-documentary film award from 28th Fajr International Film Festival, Iran
- Women with Gunpowder Earrings:
  - Main award of the 16th Signes de Nuit international film festival in France
  - Best Documentary Award at the 8th ÍRÁN:CI, the Festival of Iranian Films in Prague, Brno, and Bratislava
  - Best feature-length documentary of 2017 at the 11th Cinema Verite, an Iranian documentary film festival.
