= 1920 in film =

The year 1920 in film involved some significant events.

== Top-grossing films (U.S.) ==
The top five films released in 1920 by U.S. gross are as follows:

Highest-grossing films of 1920
Rank	Title	Distributor	Domestic rentals
1	Way Down East	United Artists	$2,000,000
2	Why Change Your Wife?	Paramount	$1,046,286
3	Passion (Madame Dubarry)	UFA/First National	$1,000,000
4	Something to Think About	Paramount	$915,848
5	The Mark of Zorro	United Artists	$500,000

== Events ==
- March 28 – "America's Sweetheart" Mary Pickford and "Everybody's Hero" Douglas Fairbanks marry, becoming the first supercouple of Hollywood.
- August – Jack Cohn, Joe Brandt and Harry Cohn form C. B. C. Film Sales Corporation which would later become Columbia Pictures.
- August 2 – Filming a nighttime spin before a large crowd at DeMille Field in Los Angeles for the movie The Skywayman, stunt pilot and film actor Ormer Locklear and his flying partner Milton "Skeets" Elliot are killed when their Curtiss JN-4 fails to come out of the spin and crashes into the sludge pool of an oil well, igniting a massive explosion and fire.
- August 15 – Robert J. Flaherty arrives in northern Canada to begin filming Nanook of the North (1922).
- November 27 – The Mark of Zorro, starring Douglas Fairbanks, opens.

== Notable films released in 1920 ==
=== Austria ===
For a complete list see: List of Austrian films of the 1920s

- Anita (aka Trance), directed by Luise Kolm and Jakob Fleck; an obscure adaptation of George Du Maurier's novel Trilby
- Boccaccio, directed by Michael Curtiz.
- The Prince and the Pauper directed by Alexander Korda.
- The Scourge of God directed by Michael Curtiz.
- The Star of Damascus directed by Michael Curtiz.

=== France ===
For a complete list see: List of French films of 1920

- Barrabas, a 12-chapter serial/ crime drama directed by Louis Feuillade
- The Man Who Sold His Soul to the Devil, directed by Pierre Caron
- Les Morts qui parlent/ The Dead Who Speak, directed by Pierre Marodon
- Narayana (translates as Vishnu), directed by Leon Poirier, starring Laurence Myrga and Edmon Van Daele; based on the 1831 novel "Le Peau de Chagrin" by Honore de Balzac, with some story elements lifted from Wilkie Collins' novel The Moonstone
- The Silence, ghost film directed by Louis Delluc, starring Gabriel Signoret and Eve Francis (Delluc's wife)

=== Germany ===
For a complete list see: List of German films of 1920

- Algol: Tragedy of Power, science fiction film directed by Hans Werckmeister, starring Emil Jannings
- Anna Boleyn directed by Ernst Lubitsch
- The Cabinet of Dr. Caligari directed by Robert Wiene; starring Werner Krauss, Conrad Veidt and Lil Dagover
- Cagliostro, directed by Reinhold Schuenzel, starred Schuenzel and Conrad Veidt (a lost film)
- The Devil Worshippers/ Die Teufelsanbeter, A 6-part serial directed by Marie Louise Droop, starring Carl de Vogt and Bela Lugosi, based on the novel by Carl May
- Evening – Night – Morning (Abend – Nacht – Morgen) directed by F. W. Murnau
- Genuine: A Tale of a Vampire, directed by Robert Wiene, starring Fern Andra; only a 43-minute condensation of the much longer original film exists
- The Golem: How He Came into the World (Der Golem, Wie Er in die Welt Kam), directed by and starring Paul Wegener based on the old Jewish folktale, photographed by Karl Freund
- The Head of Janus (Der Januskopf), directed by F. W. Murnau, starring Conrad Veidt and Bela Lugosi, photographed by Karl Freund; based (without authorization) on the Robert Louis Stevenson novel Dr. Jekyll and Mr. Hyde
- Hound of the Baskervilles, directed by Willy Zehn, released in two parts (Dr. MacDonald's Sanitorium and The House Without Windows); Willy Keyser-Heyl played Sherlock Holmes
- The House Without Windows, directed by Friedrich Feher, not to be confused with the above Hound of the Baskervilles
- The Hunchback and the Dancer (Der Bucklige und die Tänzerin), directed by F. W. Murnau, photographed by Karl Freund
- Kohlhiesels Töchter (Kohlhiesel's Daughter) directed by Ernst Lubitsch
- Kurfurstendamm, a horror-comedy written and directed by Richard Oswald, starring Conrad Veidt as The Devil, photographed by Carl Hoffmann
- The Last of the Mohicans (Der Letzte der Mohikaner), starring Bela Lugosi
- Nachtgestalten (aka Eleagable Kuperus), directed by Richard Oswald, starring Conrad Veidt and Paul Wegener, photographed by Carl Hoffmann, based on the Karl Hans Strobl short story Eleagable Kuperus
- Satan (Satanas) directed by F. W. Murnau, starred Conrad Veidt, filmed in 1919
- Sumurun (One Arabian Night) directed by Ernst Lubitsch, starring Paul Wegener and Pola Negri
- Die Todeskarawane, starring Dora Gerson and Bela Lugosi
- Torgus, the Coffin Maker, directed by Hans Kobe

=== Hungary ===
- Lord Arthur Saville's Crime (aka The Mark of the Phantom), written and directed by Paul Fejos, starring Margit Lux, based on the 1891 story by Oscar Wilde

=== Ireland ===
- Willy Reilly and His Colleen Bawn, directed by John MacDonagh, featuring Brian Magowan and Frances Alexander, based on the 1855 novel Willy Reilly and his dear Colleen Bawn by William Carleton

=== Italy ===
- The Last of the Borgias, directed by Armando Carbone
- Monella Street, directed by Umberto Fracchia and starring Carmen Boni
- The Power of the Borgias, directed by Luigi Caramba for Medusa Film, starring Irene Saffo-Nomo and Enrico Piacentini
- Spiritism (aka Spiritismo), starring Francesca Bettina

=== Japan ===
- Akakabe Myojin/ The Red Wall God, a ghost-cat film directed by Jiro Yoshino for Kokkatsu Films, starring Shirogoro Sawamura
- Arima no neko/ The Cat in Arima, a ghost-cat film directed by Shozo Makino for Nikkatsu Films, starring Matsumosuke Onoe and Sentaro Nakamura

=== Philippines ===
For a complete list see: List of Philippine films before 1940

- La Mariposa Negra directed by Jose Nepomuceno

=== Sweden ===
For a complete list see: List of Swedish films before 1930

- Erotikon directed by Mauritz Stiller
- Herr och fru Stockholm (How Not to Dress), starring Greta Garbo
- Karin Daughter of Ingmar (Karin Ingmarsdotter) directed by & starring Victor Sjöström
- The Monastery of Sendomir (Klostret i Sendomir) directed by Victor Sjöström
- The Parson's Widow (Prästänkan) directed by Carl Theodor Dreyer

=== United Kingdom ===
For a complete list see: List of British films of 1920

- At the Villa Rose, directed by Maurice Elvey, based on the 1910 novel by A.E.W. Mason
- The Barton Mystery, directed by Harry (Henry) Roberts, starred Lyn Harding; based on the 1917 stage play by Walter Hackett
- Bleak House directed by Maurice Elvey
- Build Thy House directed by Fred Goodwins, starring Henry Ainley
- Colonel Newcome directed by Fred Goodwins' starring Milton Rosmer, Joyce Carey
- Desire (aka The Magic Skin) directed by George Edwardes-Hall, starring Dennis Neilson-Terry, based on the 1831 novel Le Peau de Chagrin by Honore de Balzac
- Ernest Maltravers directed by Jack Denton; starring Lillian Hall-Davis
- The Ever Open Door directed by Fred Goodwins; starring Hayford Hobbs
- The Face at the Window, directed by Wilfred Noy, starring C. Aubrey Smith and Gladys Jennings, based on the stage play by F. Brooke Warren
- The Fordington Twins directed by W.P. Kellino
- General Post directed by Thomas Bentley; starring Douglas Munro, Lilian Braithwaite
- The Great London Mystery, a 12-chapter serial directed by Charles Raymond for T&P Films, starring David Devant and Lady Doris Stapleton; features a Yellow Peril menace called Ching Ling Fu.
- The Lure of Crooning Water directed by Arthur Rooke; starring Guy Newall and Ivy Duke
- Mr. Gilfil's Love Story directed by A.V. Bramble; starring Mary Odette
- The Price of Silence (aka At the Mercy of Tiberius), directed by Fred Leroy Granville, starring Peggy Hyland and Campbell Gullan
- A Son of David directed by Hay Plumb; starring Ronald Colman
- Trent's Last Case directed by Richard Garrick; starring Gregory Scott, Pauline Peters and Clive Brook
- The Twelve Pound Look directed by Jack Denton; starring Milton Rosmer
- The Yellow Claw, directed by Rene Plaisetty, starring Arthur Cullin and Cyril Percival; based on the 1915 novel by Sax Rohmer featuring a criminal Asian menace named Mr. King.

=== United States ===
For a complete list see: List of American films of 1920

==== A ====
- Along the Moonbeam Trail, contained animated dinosaur sequences by Willis O'Brien
- April Folly, directed by Robert Z. Leonard, starring Marion Davies and Conway Tearle

==== B ====
- Black Shadows, directed by Howard M. Mitchell

==== C ====
- The Copperhead, directed by Charles Maigne, starring Lionel Barrymore

==== D ====
- The Dark Mirror, directed by Charles Giblyn, starring Dorothy Dalton, based on the story by Louis Joseph Vance
- The Devil's Pass Key (lost), directed by Erich von Stroheim, starring Mae Busch
- The Devil to Pay, directed by Ernest C. Warde, based on a 1917 novel by Frances Nimmo Greene
- Dr. Jekyll and Mr. Hyde, directed by John S. Robertson, starring John Barrymore
- Dr. Jekyll and Mr. Hyde, directed by J. Charles Haydon, starring Sheldon Lewis
- The Dream Cheater, directed by Ernest C. Warde, starring J. Warren Kerrigan, based on the 1831 novel La Peau de chagrin by Honoré de Balzac

==== F ====
- The Flapper, directed by Alan Crosland, starring Olive Thomas

==== G ====
- The Girl in Number 29 (lost), directed by John Ford, starring Frank Mayo
- Go and Get It, directed by Marshall Neilan and Henry Roberts Symonds

==== H ====
- Haunted Spooks, directed by Alfred J. Goulding and Hal Roach, starring Harold Lloyd
- His Brother's Keeper (lost), directed by Wilfred North
- The House of the Tolling Bell, directed by J. Stuart Blackton, starring May McAvoy and Bruce Gordon, based on the novel by Edith Sessions Tupper
- The House of Whispers (lost), directed by Ernest C. Warde, starring J. Warren Kerrigan, based on the 1918 novel by William Andrew Johnston
- Huckleberry Finn, directed by William Desmond Taylor, starring Lewis Sargent

==== I ====
- If I Were King, directed by J. Gordon Edwards, starring William Farnum

==== J ====
- The Jack-Knife Man, directed by King Vidor
- Judy of Rogue's Harbor (lost), directed by William Desmond Taylor, starring Mary Miles Minter

==== L ====
- Lady Rose's Daughter (lost), directed by Hugh Ford, starring Elsie Ferguson
- The Last of the Mohicans, directed by Maurice Tourneur and Clarence Brown, starring Wallace Beery and Barbara Bedford
- The Love Flower, directed by D. W. Griffith, starring Richard Barthelmess and Carol Dempster
- Love Without Question (lost), directed by B. A. Rolfe, starring Olive tell, based on the 1917 novel The Abandoned Room by Charles Wadsworth Camp
- Luring Shadows, directed by Joseph Levering

==== M ====
- The Mark of Zorro, directed by Fred Niblo, starring Douglas Fairbanks, Marguerite De La Motte and Noah Beery Sr.
- The Master Mind, directed by Kenneth Webb, starring Lionel Barrymore
- The Mollycoddle, directed by Victor Fleming, starring Douglas Fairbanks and Wallace Beery
- The Mystery Mind, a 15-chapter serial directed by William S. Davis and Fred Sittenham

==== N ====
- Nomads of the North, directed by David Hartford and James Oliver Curwood, starring Lon Chaney, Betty Blythe and Lewis Stone

==== O ====
- Old Lady 31, directed by John Ince, starring Emma Dunn
- One Hour Before Dawn, directed by Henry King, starring H. B. Warner and Anna Q. Nilsson
- Outside the Law, directed by Tod Browning, starring Priscilla Dean and Lon Chaney
- Over the Hill to the Poorhouse, directed by Harry F. Millarde

==== P ====
- The Penalty, directed by Wallace Worsley, starring Lon Chaney, based on the pulp novel by Gouverneur Morris
- The Phantom Foe, a 15-chapter serial directed by Bertram Millhauser, starring Juanita Hansen and Warner Oland
- The Phantom Melody (lost), directed by Douglas Gerrard, starring Monroe Salisbury
- Pollyanna, directed by Paul Powell, starring Mary Pickford

==== R ====
- The Restless Sex, directed by Robert Z. Leonard, starring Marion Davies
- Romance (lost), directed by Chester Withey

==== S ====
- The Screaming Shadow (lost), a 15-chapter serial directed by Ben F. Wilson and Duke Worne
- Sex, directed by Fred Niblo, starring Louise Glaum
- Shipwrecked Among Cannibals (lost), documentary film directed by William F. Adler
- Something to Think About, directed by Cecil B. DeMille, starring Gloria Swanson
- Stolen Moments, directed by James Vincent, starring Marguerite Namara and Rudolph Valentino
- Suds, directed by John Francis Dillon, starring Mary Pickford

==== T ====
- Treasure Island (lost), directed by Maurice Tourneur, starring Lon Chaney and Shirley Mason

==== W ====
- Way Down East, directed by D. W. Griffith, starring Lillian Gish and Richard Barthelmess
- Within Our Gates, directed by Oscar Micheaux, starring Evelyn Preer
- Why Change Your Wife?, directed by Cecil B. DeMille, starring Gloria Swanson, Thomas Meighan and Bebe Daniels

== Film serials ==
- The Son of Tarzan, a 15-chapter film series

=== Short film series ===
- Harold Lloyd (1913–1951)
  - An Eastern Westerner
  - Get Out and Get Under
  - Haunted Spooks
  - High and Dizzy
  - His Royal Slyness
  - Number, Please?
- Buster Keaton (1917–1941)
  - The Garage
  - One Week
  - The Saphead
  - Convict 13
  - The Scarecrow
  - Neighbors

== Animated short film series ==
The following is a list of animated shorts of the year 1920 that belong to series that lasted several years.

- Felix the Cat (1919–1936)
  - A Frolic with Felix (January 25, 1920)
  - Felix the Big Game Hunter (February 22, 1920)
  - Wrecking a Romeo (March 7, 1920)
  - Felix the Food Controller (April 11, 1920)
  - Felix the Pinch Hitter (April 18, 1920)
  - Foxy Felix (May 16, 1920)
  - A Hungry Hoodoo (June 6, 1920)
  - The Great Cheese Robbery (June 13, 1920)
  - Felix and the Feed Bag (July 18, 1920)
  - Nifty Nurse (August 22, 1920)
  - The Circus (September 26, 1920)
  - My Hero (October 24, 1920)
  - Felix the Landlord (November 21, 1920)
  - Felix's Fish Story (December 26, 1920)
- Out of the Inkwell (1918–1929)

A major animated series of the silent era produced by Max Fleischer from 1918 to 1929 in which it appeared Koko the Clown:

- The Boxing Kangaroo
- The Chinaman
- The Circus
- The Ouija Board
- The Clown's Little Brother
- Perpetual Motion
- Poker
- The Restaurant

== Births ==
- January 4 - Rosalie Crutchley, British actress (died 1997)
- January 6 - Henry Corden, Canadian-American actor (died 2005)
- January 7
  - Vincent Gardenia, Italian actor (died 1992)
  - Witold Sadowy, Polish actor (died 2020)
- January 9 - Clive Dunn, English actor (died 2012)
- January 16 - Elliott Reid, American actor (died 2013)
- January 19 - Johnny Haymer, American actor (died 1989)
- January 20
  - Federico Fellini, film director (died 1993)
  - Michael Higgins, American actor (died 2008)
  - DeForest Kelley, actor (died 1999)
- January 24 - Jerry Maren, American actor (died 2018)
- January 27 – John Box, production designer, four-time Oscar winner (died 2005)
- January 30
  - Michael Anderson, director (died 2018)
  - Delbert Mann, director (died 2007)
- February 3 - Bibi Osterwald, American actress (died 2002)
- February 8 – Bengt Ekerot, Swedish actor and director (died 1971)
- February 11 – Billy Halop, actor (died 1976)
- February 26 – Tony Randall, actor (died 2004)
- February 29 – Michèle Morgan, actress (died 2016)
- March 3 – James Doohan, actor (died 2005)
- March 6 – Lewis Gilbert, director (died 2018)
- March 16 – Leo McKern, actor (died 2002)
- March 19 – Paul Hagen, Danish actor (died 2003)
- March 22
  - Werner Klemperer, German actor (died 2000)
  - Ross Martin, Polish-American actor (died 1981)
- April 1
  - Toshiro Mifune, actor (died 1997)
  - Susanna Ramel, Swedish actress (died 2020)
- April 2 – Jack Webb, actor (died 1982)
- April 17 - Arnold Yarrow, British actor and screenwriter (died 2024)
- April 20 – Gianrico Tedeschi, actor (died 2020)
- April 28 - John Strauss, American composer (died 2011)
- May 2
  - John Boswall, British actor (died 2011)
  - Preben Neergaard, Danish actor (died 1990)
- May 7 – Rendra Karno, Indonesian actor (died 1985)
- May 11 – Denver Pyle, actor (died 1997)
- May 16 – Martine Carol, actress (died 1967)
- May 20 – Virginia Vale, actress (died 2006)
- May 26
  - John Dall, American actor (died 1971)
  - Peggy Lee, singer, songwriter, actress (died 2002)
- May 29 – Clifton James, actor (died 2017)
- June 1 - Alethea McGrath, Australian actress and comedian (died 2016)
- June 12 – Jim Siedow, American actor (died 2003)
- June 13 – Rex Everhart, American actor (died 2000)
- June 15 – Alberto Sordi, Italian actor (died 2003)
- June 17 – Setsuko Hara, Japanese film actress (died 2015)
- June 18 – Ian Carmichael, English stage, film and television actor (died 2010)
- June 25 - Lassie Lou Ahern, American actress (died 2018)
- June 29 – Ray Harryhausen, producer, visual effects artist (died 2013)
- July 1 – Harold Sakata, American film actor (died 1982)
- July 5 - Viola Harris, American actress (died 2017)
- July 11 – Yul Brynner, actor (died 1985)
- July 12 – Keith Andes, American actor (died 2005)
- July 16 – Phillip Pine, American actor (died 2006)
- July 28 – Andrew V. McLaglen, film & TV director, son of Victor McLaglen (died 2014)
- July 29 – Rodolfo Acosta, actor (died 1974)
- July 31 – Franca Valeri, actress (died 2020)
- August 1 - Victor Millan, American actor (died 2009)
- August 6 – Ella Raines, actress (died 1988)
- August 8 - Dominique Marcas, French actress (died 2022)
- August 11 - Mike Douglas, American singer, television host and actor (died 2006)
- August 13 – Neville Brand, actor (died 1992)
- August 17 – Maureen O'Hara, actress (died 2015)
- August 18 – Shelley Winters, actress (died 2006)
- August 19 - Hugh Manning, English actor (died 2004)
- August 22 – Ray Bradbury, writer (died 2012)
- August 30 - Leonid Shvartsman, Russian animator (died 2022)
- August 31
  - James Lanphier, American actor (died 1969)
  - G. D. Spradlin, American actor (died 2011)
- September 1 - Richard Farnsworth, American actor and stuntman (died 2000)
- September 13 - John Crawford, American actor (died 2010)
- September 18 – Jack Warden, actor (died 2006)
- September 23 – Mickey Rooney, actor (died 2014)
- September 26 – Barbara Britton, actress (died 1980)
- September 27 – William Conrad, actor (died 1994)
- October 1 – Walter Matthau, actor (died 2000)
- October 9
  - Enrique Lucero, Mexican actor (died 1989)
  - Jason Wingreen, American actor (died 2015)
- October 10 - Noah Keen, actor (died 2019)
- October 13 – Laraine Day, actress (died 2007)
- October 15 - Mario Puzo, American author and screenwriter (died 1999)
- October 17 – Montgomery Clift, actor (died 1966)
- October 18 – Melina Mercouri, actress (died 1994)
- October 19 - LaWanda Page, American actress and comedian (died 2002)
- October 21
  - Hy Averback, actor (died 1997)
  - Ruth Terry, actress, singer (died 2016)
- October 22 – Mitzi Green, actress (died 1969)
- October 27 – Nanette Fabray, actress (died 2018)
- October 29 - Hilda Bernard, Argentine actress (died 2022)
- November 8 - Esther Rolle, American actress (died 1998)
- November 10 – Jennifer Holt, actress (died 1997)
- November 13 – Jack Elam, actor (died 2003)
- November 19 – Gene Tierney, actress (died 1991)
- November 21 – Ralph Meeker, actor (died 1988)
- November 25
  - Shelagh Fraser, English actress (died 2000)
  - Ricardo Montalbán, actor (died 2009)
  - Noel Neill, actress (died 2016)
- November 26 - Daniel Petrie, Canadian director (died 2004)
- November 27 - Buster Merryfield, British actor (died 1999)
- November 30 – Virginia Mayo, actress (died 2005)
- December 7 – Frances Gifford, actress (died 1994)
- December 23 - Alan North, American actor (died 2000)
- December 29 – Viveca Lindfors, actress (died 1995)
- December 30 – Jack Lord, actor (died 1998)
- December 31 – Rex Allen, American cowboy actor, singer (died 1999)

== Deaths ==
- January 31 – Gilda Langer, 23, German actress
- February 11 – Gaby Deslys, 38, French actress, dancer, singer
- February 17 – Thomas Commerford, 64, American veteran character actor
- March 2 – Harry Solter, 46, American actor
- April 12 – Walter Edwards, 50, American director
- April 25 – Clarine Seymour, 21, American actress
- May 22 – Hal Reid, 59, American actor & director (father of Wallace Reid)
- June 14 – Gabrielle Réjane, 64, stage and film actress
- August 1 – Eugene Gaudio, 33, Italian born cinematographer (brother of Tony Gaudio)
- August 2 – Ormer Locklear, 29, American stunt flier
- August 13 – Gladys Field, 31, actress (died in childbirth)
- August 28 – Suzanne Grandais, 27, French actress
- September 5 – Robert Harron, 27, American actor
- September 10 – Olive Thomas, 25, American actress
- November 19 – Will S. Davis, 38, American film director
- December 9 – Mollie McConnell, 55, American actress

== Film debuts ==
- Madge Bellamy – The Riddle: Woman
- Noah Beery Jr. – The Mark of Zorro
- Charles Boyer – L'homme du large
- Edward Brophy – Yes or No?
- Charles Byer – Headin' Home
- Mary Clare – The Black Spider
- Philippe De Lacy – The Riddle: Woman
- Jay Eaton – Her First Elopement
- Bud Geary – What Would You Do?
- Vera Gordon – Humoresque
- Ralf Harolde – Headin' Home
- David Hawthorne – Testimony
- Philippe Hériat – Le Carnaval des vérités
- Martita Hunt – A Rank Outsider
- Roger Karl – L'homme du large
- Barbara La Marr – Harriet and the Piper
- Ernst Legal – The Mayor of Zalamea
- Dorothy Mackaill – The Face at the Window
- Miles Mander – Testimony
- Cyril McLaglen – The Call of the Road
- Victor McLaglen – The Call of the Road
- Charles Middleton – Wits vs. Wits
- Eva Moore – The Law Divine
- Margaret Morris – Her First Elopement
- Nita Naldi – Dr. Jekyll and Mr. Hyde
- Claude Rains – Build Thy House
- Max Schreck – The Mayor of Zalamea
- Bob Steele – The Adventures of Bill and Bob
- Ruth Weyher – Der Hirt von Maria Schnee
- Clarence Wilson – Duds

== Films set in 1920 ==
There are films released in later years whose plot is developed totally or partially in 1920:

- Manhattan Melodrama (1934)
- Winterset (1936)
- The Road Back (1937)
- Clash of Loyalties (1938)
- Three Comrades (1938)
- Hostile Whirlwinds (1953): Film portrays the first years of Soviet government, biography of Felix Dzerzhinsky in 1918–1921.
- Kappalottiya Thamizhan (1961)
- The Ball of Count Orgel (1970): Set in 1920, the Comte hosts a soirée and dance for the upper echelons of Parisian society.
- Vengeance (1970): The film is set in 1920 Peking, and centers on a revenge plight of Chiang.
- Reds (1981)
- Once Upon a Time in America (1984): David "Noodles" Aaronson struggles as a street kid in Manhattan's Lower East Side in 1920.
- The Man Who Planted Trees (1987)
- A Month in the Country (1987): Set in rural Yorkshire during the summer of 1920, the film follows a destitute World War I veteran employed to carry out restoration work on a medieval mural discovered in a rural church while coming to terms with the after-effects of the war.
- Life and Nothing But (1989): Set in October 1920, it tells the story of Major Delaplane, a man whose job is to find the identities of unknown dead soldiers after World War I.
- The Treaty (1991): The film is about the Anglo-Irish Treaty that Michael Collins bargained for with the British government in 1921.
- Michael Collins (1996)
- The Image Makers (2000): The drama is set in the year 1920 at Filmstaden where the film director Victor Sjöström is shooting the film The Phantom Carriage.
- The Admiral (2008)
- 1920 film series (2008–2016)

1920 (2008)
1920: Evil Returns (2012)
1920: London (2016)

- Battle of Warsaw 1920 (2011)
- Sunstroke (2014)
