= Grace Lutheran Church =

Grace Lutheran Church may refer to:

- Grace Lutheran Church (Phoenix, Arizona) is a historic church in Phoenix, Arizona, on the U.S. National Register of Historic Places.
- Grace Lutheran Church (Uniontown, Missouri), member congregation of the Lutheran Church–Missouri Synod
- Grace Lutheran Church of Barber, U.S. National Registered Historic Place near Ryegate, Montana
- Grace Lutheran Church (Sheyenne, North Dakota), Lutheran church in Sheyenne, North Dakota
- Grace Lutheran Church (Carrollton, Georgia), an ELCA affiliated church in Carrollton, Georgia.
- Grace Lutheran Church (Lincoln, Nebraska), an ELCA affiliated church in Lincoln, Nebraska.
