= John Aasen =

American actor (1890–1938)

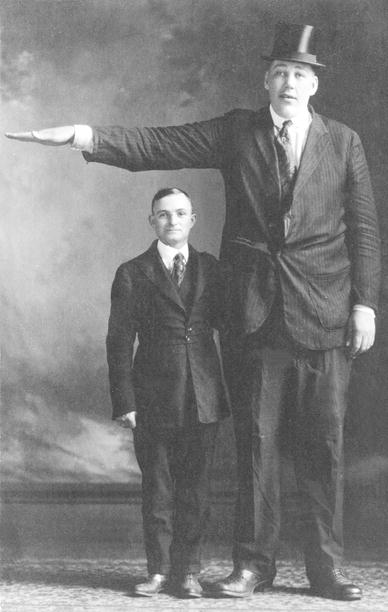
- Aasen (right) standing next to an average-height man
- Born: March 5, 1890; Minneapolis, Minnesota, U.S.
- Died: August 1, 1938 (aged 48); Mendocino, California, U.S.
- Other names: Johan Aasen; Johnny Aasen
- Occupations: Film actor, sideshow performer
- Years active: 1923–1938
- Height: 7 ft 2 in (2.18 m)

John Aasen (March 5, 1890 – August 1, 1938) was an American silent film actor and sideshow performer who was one of the tallest actors in history.

== Early life ==
Aasen was born on March 5, 1890, in Minneapolis, Minnesota. His mother, Kristi (Danielsen) from Rollag in Numedal, was an extremely tall Norwegian woman of around 2.20 m (almost 7 ft 3 inches) in height (latest information from September 2008, sets her height to 188 cm, almost 6 ft 2 inches). It is not certain who his father was, but according to Aasen's sister Evelyn (who died in 1988), his father was Alfred Aasen. When Aasen was 10 years old, he and his mother moved from Ridgeway, Iowa (where his uncle Sam/Sevre lived with his wife Cornelia), to Sheyenne, North Dakota, with his two younger siblings. Aasen was a Freemason. He rose to the degree of Master Mason at Highland Park Lodge No. 382, Los Angeles on July 14, 1924.

When in Sheyenne, Aasen's mother operated a restaurant. He attended school and helped out in the family business. In 1902, Aasen's mother died. He was taken into many homes and families. When a family he was staying with started to operate a hotel in Leeds, North Dakota, he moved with them there. Aasen's growth started slowly. When he was confirmed in the Lutheran faith in Grandfield Lutheran Church near Sheyenne, North Dakota, he was the shortest in his class. According to some sources, Aasen was around 2.74 m or 8 feet, 11½ inches (which, if true, would make him even taller than Robert Wadlow, the tallest verified person in history). The Top 10 of Everything 2010 edition states his height at 8 feet, 9.7 inches (2.68 m).

== True height ==
According to the 1978 edition of Guinness World Records he was only 7 feet (213.4 cm). Just before his death, at age 46, he was medically measured at 7 feet 0.9 inches, however he had lost some height due to age and could not stand completely straight anymore. In June 2008, Loma Linda University confirmed that the 7-foot-2.4-inch (219 cm) skeleton they had in their collection was John Aasen. A Norwegian man named Bent Lønrusten spent 13 years of his life trying to find out Aasen's true height. He found out that John/Johan was 226 cm / 7' 5" tall. His mother's (Kirsti) coffin was 186 cm / 6' 1" long, which made her approximately 183 cm – 184 cm / 6 feet tall. And his sister (Evelyn) was maybe around 175 cm –180 cm / 5' 9" – 5' 11" tall. Bent was a guest on a Norwegian podcast called "Rekommandert", talking about Aasen's history and how he found out his true height.

== Career ==
Aasen worked for Midway Chemical, a company based in St. Paul, in 1917–1918. After that, he worked in various shows, including Barnum & Bailey and C. A. Wortham's World's Best Shows.

The death of giant George Auger led to Aasen's working in the film Why Worry? (1923). Later, he acted in several other films like Bengal Tiger, Charlie Chan at the Circus, Growing Pains, Should Married Men Go Home?, Legionnaires in Paris, Two Flaming Youths, The Sting of Stings, Long Fliv the King and the Tod Browning film Freaks, in a small uncredited cameo appearance.

== Filmography ==
=== Film ===
Year	Title	Role	Note
1923	Why Worry?	Colosso (as Johan Aasen)	
1926	Long Fliv the King	Giant Swordsman	Short, uncredited
1927	Legionnaires in Paris	Giant	Short
1927	Two Flaming Youths	The Giant	uncredited
1928	Should Married Men Go Home?	Very Tall Golfer	Short, uncredited
1928	Growing Pains	Circue giant	Short
1929	Show of Shows	Junior	uncredited
1932	Freaks	Giant	uncredited
1933	The Rummy	Tall Mechanic	Short, uncredited
1935	Carnival	Circus giant	uncredited
1936	Charlie Chan at the Circus	Giant Man	uncredited
1936	Bengal Tiger	Giant	uncredited

=== Television ===
Year	Title	Role	Note
1989	American Masters	Giant in Why Worry?	archive footage, posthumously release, episode: Harold Lloyd: The Third Genius
2005	Harold Lloyd Comedy Collection: Mini Biographies	Colosso	archive footage, posthumously release, video

== See also ==
- List of tallest people
