= Long Fliv the King =

1926 film

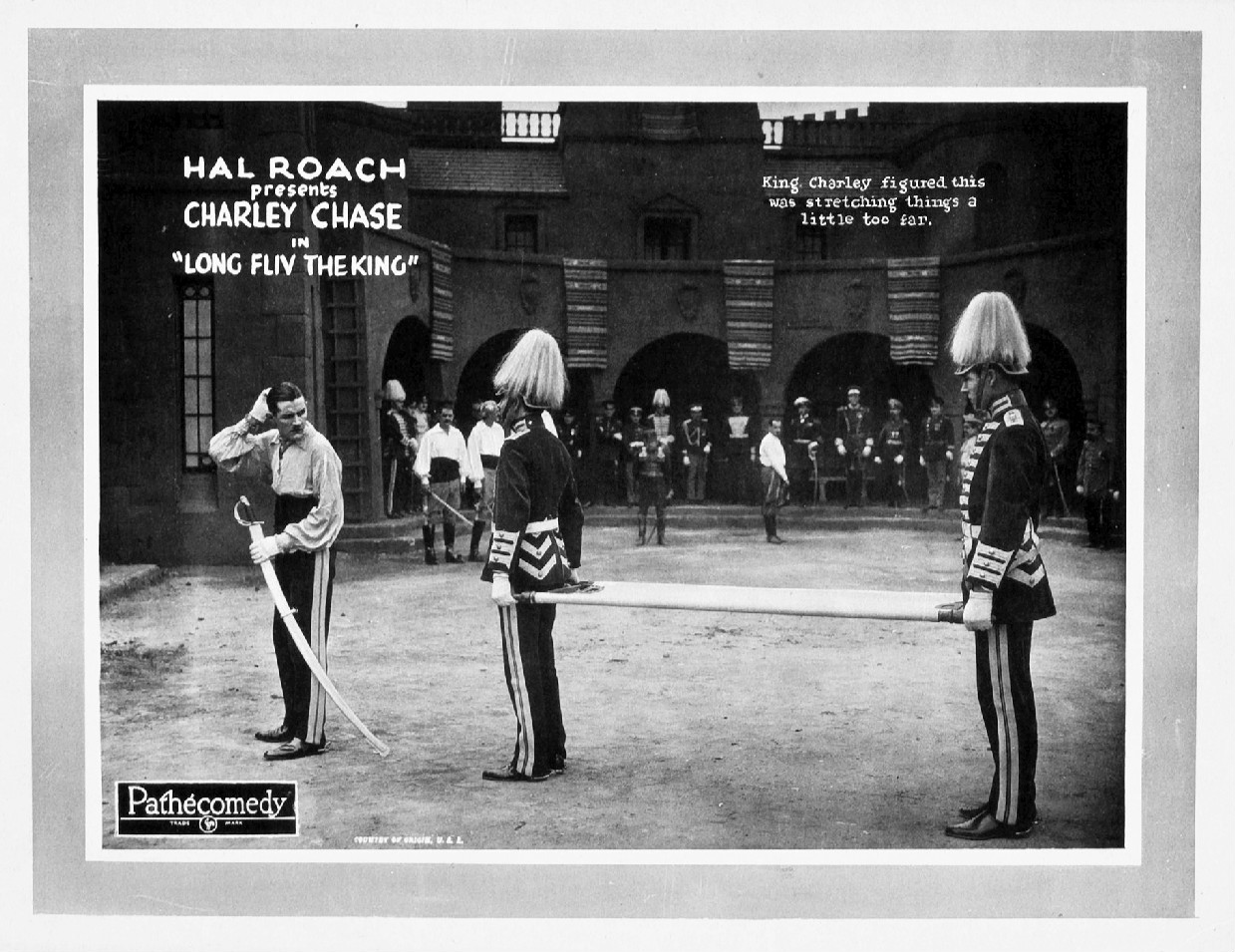
- Lobby card
- Directed by: Leo McCarey
- Written by: Charles Alphin; H. M. Walker
- Produced by: Hal Roach
- Starring: Charley Chase
- Cinematography: Floyd Jackman
- Edited by: Richard C. Currier
- Production company: Hal Roach Studios
- Distributed by: Pathé Exchange
- Release date: June 13, 1926
- Running time: 25 minutes
- Country: United States
- Language: Silent (English intertitles)

Long Fliv the King is a 1926 American silent comedy short film starring Charley Chase and featuring Oliver Hardy and Max Davidson in supporting roles. It is a remake of the 1920 Harold Lloyd film His Royal Slyness about a young man who accidentally becomes the king of a tiny country.

== Plot ==
This plot summary was published in The Motion Picture News for June 12, 1926:

Bebe Daniels and Harry Pollard support Lloyd in the one-reel re-issue which tells of bankruptcy and thievery. "Long Fliv the King" is the title of the two-reel Hal Roach comedy starring Charley Chase. The cast includes Martha Sleeper, Fred Malatesta, Oliver Hardy and Max Davidson. Leo McCarey directed. It is a crook version of a Graustark story.

== Cast ==
- Charley Chase as Charles Chase
- Martha Sleeper as Princess Helga of Thermosa
- Max Davidson as Warfield
- Oliver Hardy as The Prime Minister's Assistant
- Fred Malatesta as Hamir of Uvocado, the Prime Minister
- John Aasen as Giant Swordsman (uncredited)
- Sammy Brooks as (uncredited)
- Helen Gilmore as Helga's Lady-in-Waiting (uncredited)
- Lon Poff as (uncredited)

== See also ==
- List of American films of 1926
