= Legionnaires in Paris =

1927 film

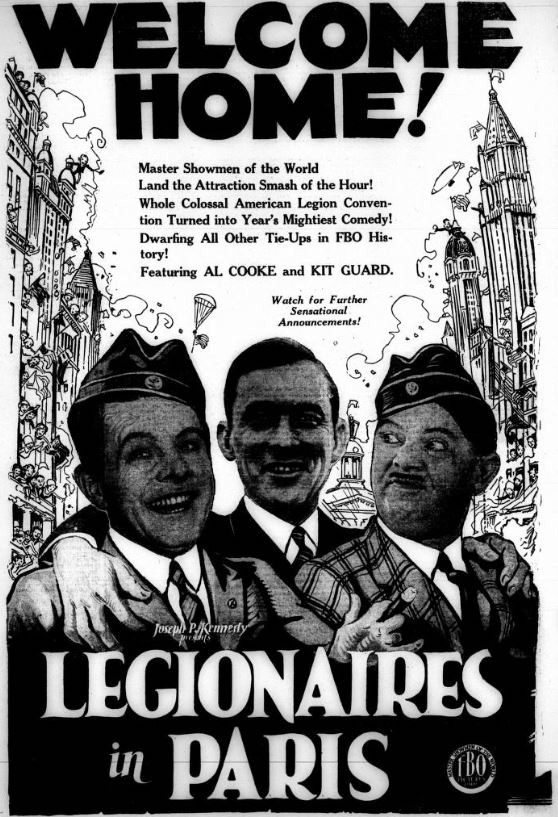
- Advertisement
- Directed by: Arvid E. Gillstrom
- Written by: John W. Conway; Jefferson Moffitt; Louis Sarecky
- Produced by: Joseph P. Kennedy
- Starring: Al Cooke; Kit Guard; Louise Lorraine
- Cinematography: Philip Tannura
- Edited by: Archie Marshek
- Production company: Film Booking Offices of America
- Distributed by: Film Booking Offices of America
- Release date: December 23, 1927
- Running time: 60 minutes
- Country: United States
- Language: Silent (English intertitles)

Legionnaires in Paris is a 1927 American silent romantic comedy film directed by Arvid E. Gillstrom and starring Al Cooke, Kit Guard, and Louise Lorraine. It was also known by the alternative title of French Leave.

== Plot ==
Two doughboys in leave in Paris on Armistice Day 1918 mistakenly believe they have killed a man and go on the run from the police.

== Cast ==
- Al Cooke as Al Cooke
- Kit Guard as Kit Guard
- Louise Lorraine as Annette
- Virginia Sale as Fifi
- John Aasen as Shorty
- Jack McHugh as Teenage Boy (uncredited)

== Preservation ==
With no prints of Legionnaires in Paris located in any film archives, it is a lost film.

== Bibliography ==
- Munden, Kenneth White. The American Film Institute Catalog of Motion Pictures Produced in the United States, Part 1. University of California Press, 1997.
