= Growing Pains (1928 film) =

1928 film

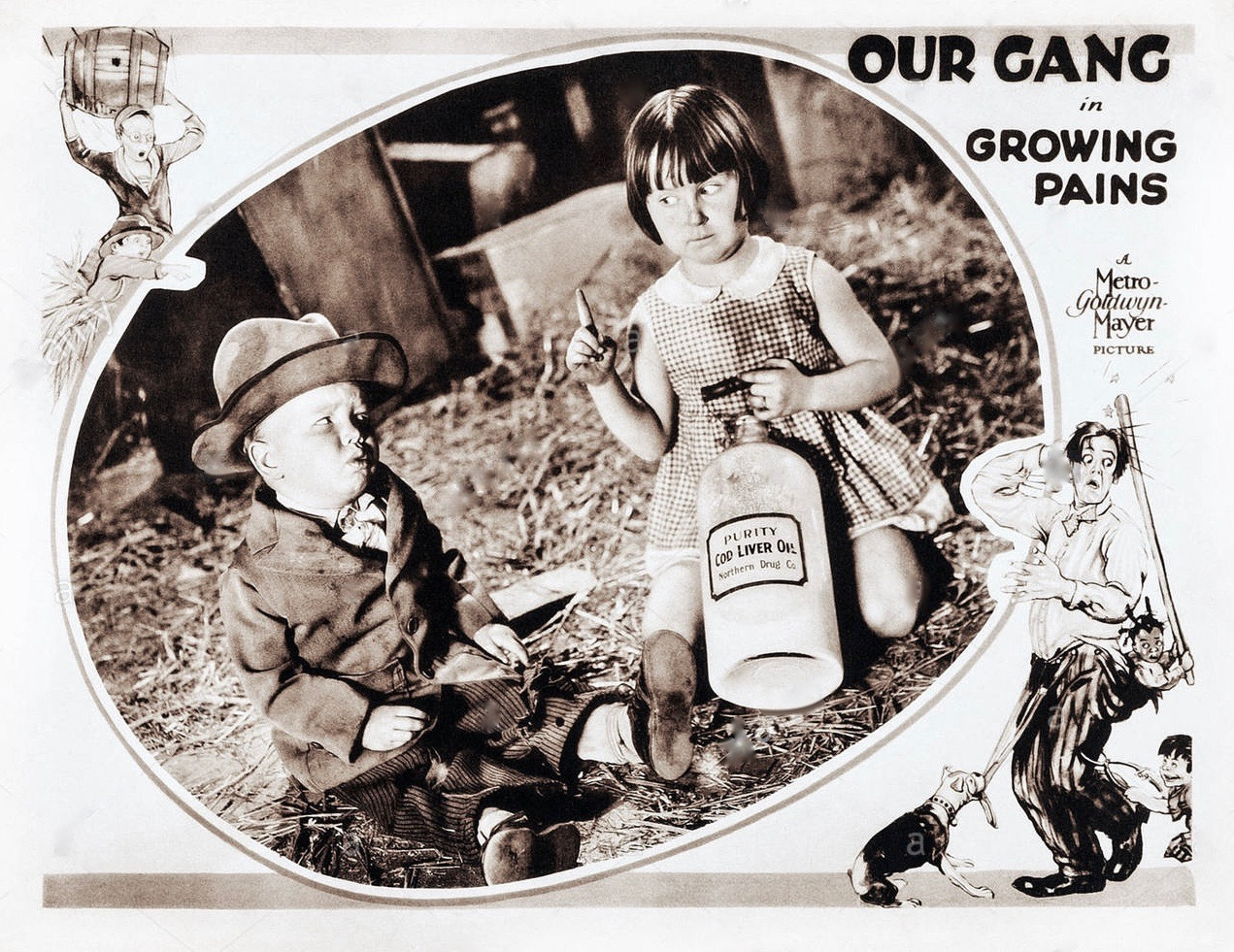
- Lobby card
- Directed by: Anthony Mack
- Written by: Anthony Mack; H. M. Walker
- Produced by: Robert F. McGowan; Hal Roach
- Starring: Mary Ann Jackson; Bobby Hutchins; Joe Cobb; Jackie Condon; Jean Darling; Allen Hoskins; Jay R. Smith; Harry Spear; Pete the Pup; John Aasen
- Cinematography: Art Lloyd
- Edited by: Richard C. Currier
- Distributed by: Metro-Goldwyn-Mayer
- Release date: September 22, 1928
- Running time: 20 minutes
- Country: United States
- Languages: Silent; English intertitles

Growing Pains is a 1928 Our Gang short silent comedy film, the 77th in the series, directed by Anthony Mack. The film is considered lost, as it was destroyed in the 1965 MGM vault fire.

== Cast ==
=== The Gang ===
- Mary Ann Jackson as Mary Ann
- Bobby Hutchins as Wheezer
- Joe Cobb as Joe
- Jackie Condon as Jackie
- Jean Darling as Jean
- Allen Hoskins as Farina
- Jay R. Smith as Jay
- Harry Spear as Harry
- Pete the Pup as Pansy

=== Additional cast ===
- John Aasen as Circus giant

== See also ==
- Our Gang filmography
