= Now or Never (1921 film) =

1921 film

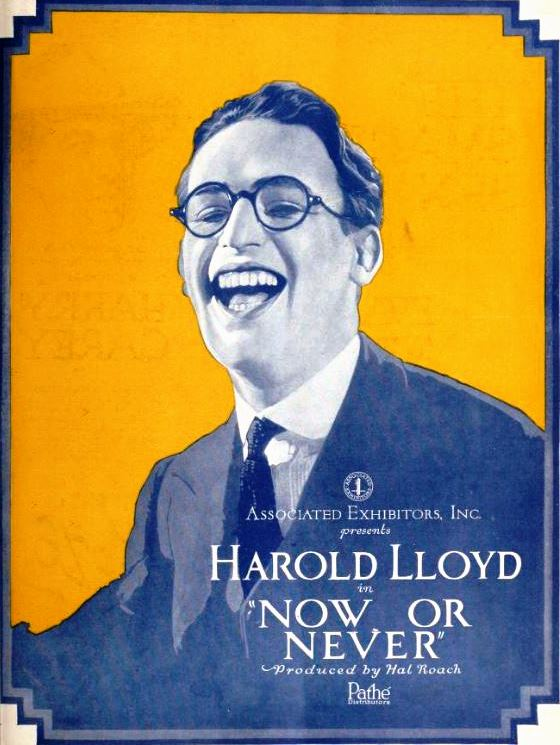
- Ad for film
- Directed by: Hal Roach; Fred C. Newmeyer
- Written by: Sam Taylor
- Produced by: Hal Roach
- Starring: Harold Lloyd
- Cinematography: Walter Lundin
- Edited by: Thomas J. Crizer
- Production company: Rolin Film Company
- Distributed by: Pathé Exchange
- Release date: March 27, 1921
- Running time: 36 minutes
- Country: United States
- Language: Silent (English intertitles)

Full film

Now or Never is a 1921 American short comedy film starring Harold Lloyd and directed by Hal Roach and Fred C. Newmeyer.

== Plot ==
A young woman, who is employed as a nanny to a lonesome child named Dolly, is preparing to take a vacation which will include a long-awaited reunion with her childhood sweetheart. Her employers are a busy couple who have no time for their small daughter, so the nanny decides—without seeking their permission—to take Dolly with her on her vacation.

Meanwhile, the young man she is to meet with races through the countryside by automobile on his way to his appointment. He crashes into a barn, loses his money to a tramp, and must complete his journey riding as a stowaway on the undercarriage of a train. After the couple meet, they and the child board a train. The woman has tickets for herself and Dolly, but the man has no ticket and no money.

The young woman discovers to her horror that her young charge's father is on the train. She does not want him to see her with Dolly, so she leaves the little girl with the young man and joins her employer in a separate coach. The young man is not an experienced babysitter, and caring for the child poses many challenges for him, especially as he must also evade the conductor.

The story ends happily: not only does Dolly's father approve of the young woman taking the little girl with her on her vacation, the young woman also discovers that her sweetheart is the man her employer was traveling to meet, as he has recently hired him for an important position.

== Cast ==
- Harold Lloyd as The Boy
- Mildred Davis as The Girl
- Anna Mae Bilson as The Lonesome Little Child (Dolly)
- William Gillespie as The Child's Father (uncredited)
- Noah Young as Angry farmer (uncredited)
- Roy Brooks as Chubby passenger (uncredited)
- Sammy Brooks as Short passenger (uncredited)
- Dale Fuller as Men-hungry passenger (uncredited)
- Wallace Howe as Sheriff of Teetersburg (uncredited)
- Mark Jones as Passenger who throws shoe (uncredited)
- Gaylord Lloyd (uncredited)
- Earl Mohan as Drunk (uncredited)
- Charles Stevenson as Conductor (uncredited)

== Preservation status ==
Prints of Now or Never exist in the collections of the UCLA Film and Television Archive and George Eastman House.

== Production ==
Harold's car is a 1919 Mercer series 5 Raceabout.

== See also ==
- Harold Lloyd filmography
