= Gaylord Lloyd =

American film actor

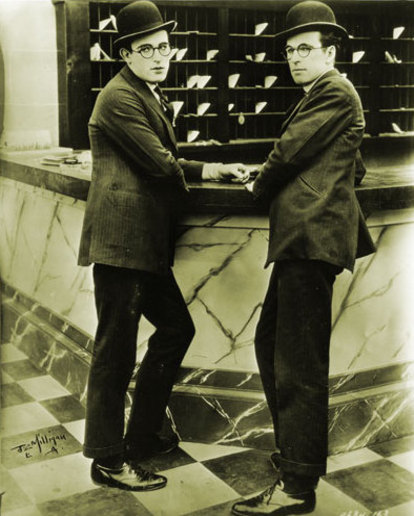
- Lloyd (right) with his brother Harold Lloyd in His Royal Slyness
- Born: Gaylord Fraser Lloyd; March 20, 1888; Burchard, Nebraska, US
- Died: September 1, 1943 (aged 55); Beverly Hills, California, US
- Occupation: Actor
- Years active: 1916-1927
- Spouse: Barbara Starr (m. 1924; div. 1931)
- Relatives: Harold Lloyd (brother)

Gaylord Fraser Lloyd (March 20, 1888 – September 1, 1943) was an actor and assistant director, known for Dodge Your Debts (1921), Trolley Troubles (1921) and Why Worry? (1923). He was the older brother of actor Harold Lloyd. He was married to Barbara Starr. He was born in Burchard, Nebraska, and died in Beverly Hills, Los Angeles, California.

He and his more famous brother looked very much alike, which allowed Gaylord to occasionally serve as a double for Harold. In the 1920 comedy His Royal Slyness, Gaylord played a prince while Harold played a lookalike American commoner.

While on the set of Scarface (1932), either as a segment director or visitor (accounts differ), he was blinded in one eye by a flying splinter from a copper explosive squib cap. Thus like his brother before him (losing part of his right hand to a prop bomb), being permanently maimed by an on-set accident.

== Partial filmography ==
Year	Title	Role	Note
1916	Luke's Double	Luke's Double	
1917	The Big Idea		
1918	Hit Him Again		lost film
1919	The Marathon		
1919	Just Neighbors	Man in Line at Bank	uncredited
1919	Start Something		
1919	Bumping into Broadway		uncredited
1919	Giving the Bride Away		
1919	Order in the Court		
1919	It's a Hard Life		
1919	How Dry I Am		
1920	His Royal Slyness		
1920	High and Dizzy		uncredited
1920	Haunted Spooks		uncredited
1920	Get Out and Get Under		uncredited
1920	Number, Please?		uncredited
1921	Now or Never		uncredited
1921	Among Those Present		uncredited
1921	Trolley Troubles		
1921	Never Weaken		uncredited
1922	Grandma's Boy		
1923	Why Worry?		
1923	Do Your Stuff		
1926	Pay the Cashier		
1927	Meet the Folks		
