= Gridiron Flash =

1934 film by Glenn Tryon

- Directed by: Glenn Tryon
- Written by: Earle Snell; Louis Stevens; Alden Nash
- Screenplay by: Glenn Tryon; Nicholas T. Barrows
- Produced by: Louis Sarecky; Pandro S. Berman
- Starring: Eddie Quillan; Betty Furness; Grant Mitchell; Lucien Littlefield
- Cinematography: John W. Boyle
- Edited by: George Crone
- Music by: Alberto Colombo
- Production company: RKO Pictures
- Distributed by: RKO Pictures
- Release date: October 26, 1934
- Running time: 64 minutes
- Country: United States
- Language: English
- Budget: $78,000
- Box office: $199,000

Gridiron Flash is a 1934 American sports film directed by Glenn Tryon and starring Eddie Quillan, Betty Furness and Grant Mitchell. It was produced and distributed by RKO Pictures. It made a profit of $43,000.

== Plot ==
Belford College's football team is so bad, unscrupulous benefactor Howard Smith recruits a jailed thief, Tommy "Cherub" Burke, after seeing him play with a football in the prison yard.

Tommy's parole is arranged. He joins the team, alienating other students with his behavior so much that Jane Thurston from the registrar's office takes a personal interest, unaware of his criminal history. The team wins every game but Tommy gets restless and wants to join a gang. Smith persuades him to rob the jewels of a rich couple, Mr. and Mrs. Fields, and split the loot.

Tommy commits the theft but gets a guilty conscience after being bribed to lose the team's final game. He returns the stolen gems and gets back to campus in time to lead Belford to one final triumph.

== Cast ==
- Eddie Quillan as Thomas Burke
- Betty Furness as Jane Thurston
- Grant Mitchell as Howard Smith
- Lucien Littlefield as L.B Fields
- Edgar Kennedy as Officer Thurston
- Grady Sutton as Pudge Harrison
- Joe Sawyer as Coach Eversmith
- Margaret Dumont as Mrs. Fields
- Walter Brennan as Diner Proprietor (uncredited)

== See also ==
- List of American football films
