= Bengal Tiger (1936 film) =

1936 film by Louis King

- Lobby card
- Directed by: Louis King
- Written by: Roy Chanslor; Earl Felton
- Produced by: Bryan Foy; Hal B. Wallis
- Starring: Barton MacLane; June Travis; Warren Hull
- Cinematography: L. William O'Connell
- Edited by: Harold McLernon
- Music by: Howard Jackson
- Production company: Warner Bros. Pictures
- Distributed by: Warner Bros. Pictures
- Release date: July 29, 1936
- Running time: 62 minutes
- Country: United States
- Language: English

Bengal Tiger is a 1936 American drama film directed by Louis King and starring Barton MacLane, June Travis and Warren Hull. The plot closely resembles that of the 1932 film Tiger Shark.

The film's sets were designed by the art director Esdras Hartley.

== Plot ==
Cliff Ballenger tries to train a tiger named "Satan" for the circus who is more dangerous than he seems.

== Cast ==
- Barton MacLane as Cliff Ballenger
- June Travis as Laura Homan Ballenger
- Warren Hull as Joe Larson
- Paul Graetz as Carl Homan
- Joseph Crehan as Bill Hinsdale
- Dick Purcell as Nick DeLargo
- Carlyle Moore Jr. as Ambulance Driver
- John Aasen as Giant
- Richard Alexander as Strong Man
- Don Barclay in a bit part
- Joseph Belmont in a bit part
- Glen Cavender as Roustabout
- Jack A. Goodrich as Jake
- Sol Gorss as Caster
- Willard Hall as Announcer
- Gordon Hart as Hospital Superintendent
- Jolly Lee Harvey as Fat Woman
- Jack Holmes as Doctor
- Stuart Holmes as Ringmaster
- Clara Horton as Hospital Secretary
- Milton Kibbee as Clerk
- Paul Panzer as Train Man
- Marie Prevost as Saloon Girl
- 'Little Billy' Rhodes as Midget
- Houseley Stevenson as Justice of the Peace
- Charlotte V. Sullivan as Midget
- Lucille Ward as Matron
- Carol Wines as Saloon Girl
- Jane Wyman as Saloon Girl

== Critical reception ==
Lionel Collier, for the British magazine, Picturegoer, described the film as an "ingenuous mixture of circus animals, thrills, and a triangular love interest", and wrote, "It is the circus atmosphere that makes the strongest appeal and the thrills connected with it are well put over. Barton MacLane is suitably tough as the trainer, and Warren Hull and June Travis are fair as the young lovers. But I think the tiger, Satan, is the one who will be the cynosure of all eyes."

== Bibliography ==
- Miller, Don. "B" Movies: An Informal Survey of the American Low-budget Film, 1933-1945. Curtis Books, 1973.
