= Why Worry? =

1923 film

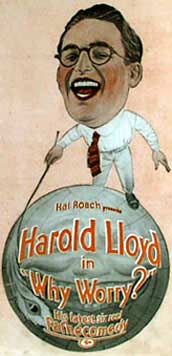
- Theatrical release poster
- Directed by: Fred C. Newmeyer; Sam Taylor
- Written by: Sam Taylor (story); H. M. Walker (titles)
- Produced by: Hal Roach
- Starring: Harold Lloyd; Jobyna Ralston; John Aasen (Colosso); Jim Mason
- Cinematography: Walter Lundin
- Edited by: Thomas J. Crizer
- Production company: Hal Roach Studios
- Distributed by: Pathé Exchange
- Release date: September 2, 1923
- Running time: 63 minutes
- Country: United States
- Language: Silent (English intertitles)
- Budget: $220,626

Why Worry? is a 1923 American silent comedy film directed by Fred C. Newmeyer and Sam Taylor and starring Harold Lloyd.

== Plot ==
The film

Harold Van Pelham is a young, wealthy American businessman who obsesses constantly about his health, believing he is deathly sick while in reality he is perfectly fine. Determined to improve his physical condition with an extended rest in a "tropical" climate, Harold travels by passenger ship with his valet Mr. Pipps and personal nurse from California to "Paradiso", a small South American island off the coast of Chile. Once in Paradiso, Harold does not find the peace and seclusion he is desperately seeking, instead he stumbles into the midst of a revolution against the island's republic. The uprising is being organized and incited by Jim Blake, a greedy "renegade" from the United States, who wants to overthrow Paradiso's government "to further his own financial interests."

After being separated from his valet and nurse, Harold wanders about the island's main town, oblivious at first to the fact that an armed revolt has occurred. Blake soon arranges to have the bewildered hypochondriac thrown into the local prison. There Harold meets Colosso, a gigantic fellow prisoner who is described by the warden as a "wild hermit" and "half crazy with a terrible toothache." The cellmates quickly engineer an escape together, and Harold subsequently helps Colosso by pulling out his painful tooth. Much relieved, the huge man is eternally grateful and vows to do Harold's will. Harold now insists that the military conflict and social unrest on the island are "bad for my heart" and must be stopped, so he and Colosso, along with Harold's nurse, manage by themselves to defeat Blake and his forces and quell the revolution. Those actions finally convince Harold that he is actually quite fit and that he no longer needs to fret daily about his health or take his array of unneeded medications. With a renewed sense of vitality, he now leaves Paradiso with Colosso and his nurse, and the trio board a ship bound for the United States, presumably reuniting on the vessel with Mr. Pipps (who reappears at the end of the film). Upon their return, Harold and his nurse marry, and Colosso finds employment as a very imposing "traffic cop."

== Cast ==
- Harold Lloyd as Harold Van Pelham
- Jobyna Ralston as Harold's Nurse
- John Aasen as Colosso (credited as Johan Aasen)
- Wallace Howe as Harold's Valet, Mr. Pipps
- James Mason as Jim Blake
- Leo White as The Mighty Herculeo
- Gaylord Lloyd as a Man
- William Gillespie as a Police Officer
- Mark Jones as a Mounted Captain

== Production ==
This was the last film made in Lloyd's partnership with Hal Roach. The village set for the film was used in Roach's Our Gang short Dogs of War, filmed at the same time and featuring guest appearances by Lloyd and Jobyna Ralston. Lloyd and Roach parted on good terms, as each simply wanted to go in different directions and Harold Lloyd now had enough money to finance his films independently. This was also Lloyd's first film to have Ralston as leading lady. She would go on to star in his next five films.

In the film's original script, the main character was to go to Mexico instead of the fictitious island of Paradiso. Lloyd made the change in response to concerns that using Mexico as the setting perpetuated unfair stereotyping.

George Auger, also known by his stage name "Cardiff Giant", was a Ringling Brothers circus giant who was originally cast to play Colosso. Auger died the day before he was scheduled to travel to California to begin filming Why Worry? After a nationwide publicity campaign to find his replacement, Norwegian John Aasen from Minnesota was chosen for the role. Aasen was reportedly discovered as a result of a newspaper article about the enormous size of his shoes.

The film was distributed by Pathe Exchange with sales assistance from the distribution company Associated Exhibitors.

== Reception ==
Why Worry? was popular with audiences in 1923 and received widespread praise from contemporary reviewers. Variety, among the leading entertainment-industry publications of the period, complimented not only the film's level of humor but also noted the consistent quality of Lloyd's work:

He rarely misses with his feature comedies and the latest is no exception. It is a production made for laughs and produces them. As with other Lloyd pictures it is full of genuine comedy ideas. The creative ability of the comedian asserts itself with credit also due to the author [Sam Taylor], who likewise aided in the direction for some of the comedy ideas...Lloyd feature comedies are looked upon as box office winners. The latest will live up with ease to the reputation of its predecessors and may be relied upon to produce.

The Film Daily, another notable trade publication in 1923, also praised Why Worry?, although it did not think the production quite equaled Lloyd's comedy Safety Last!, which had been released just five months earlier. "While Why Worry? may not be as continuously humorous or exciting as Safety Last! observed The Film Daily, "it is still an A-1 comedy entertainment and can still be counted on to satisfy the star's many admirers and all those who enjoy a good laugh. The reviewer for The New-York Evening Post gave high marks as well to Why Worry?, yet chose to compare the film to another previous work by Lloyd:

As long as Harold Lloyd continues to make films like "Why Worry?", he has no cause to worry. The picture is very laughable and is produced in only the way Harold Lloyd can put comedy on the screen. "Why Worry?", however, is not as clever or as subtle as some of his earlier five-reel releases, and "Grandma's Boy" still heads the list.

== See also ==
- Harold Lloyd filmography
