= Grace Lutheran Church (Phoenix, Arizona) =

Historic church in Arizona, United States

- U.S. National Register of Historic Places
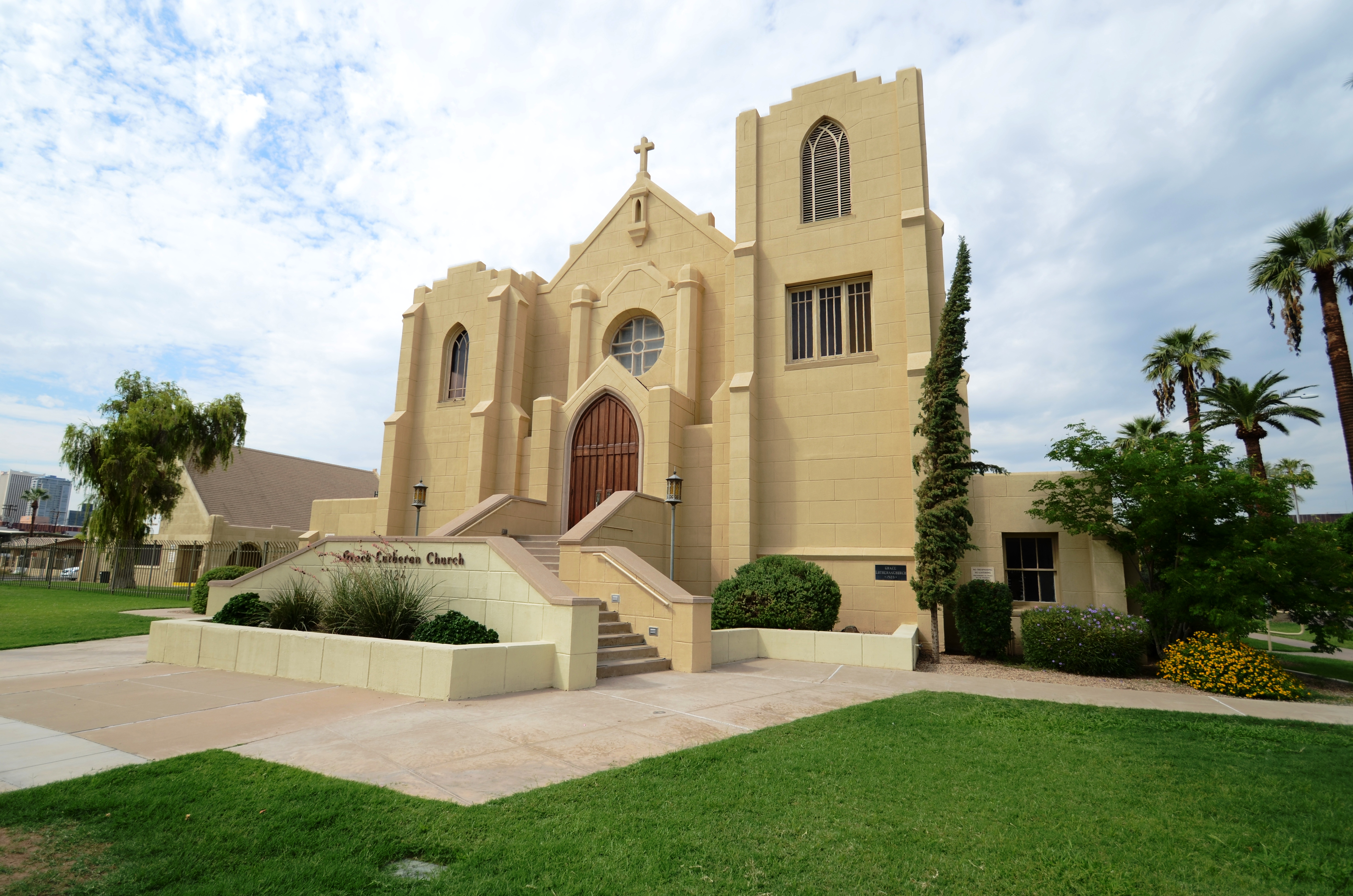

- Location within Arizona Location within the United States
- Location: 1124 N. 3rd St., Phoenix, Arizona
- Coordinates: 33°27′39″N 112°4′9″W
- Area: less than one acre
- Built: 1928
- Architectural style: Late Gothic Revival
- MPS: Religious Architecture in Phoenix MPS
- NRHP reference No.: 93000835
- Added to NRHP: August 12, 1993

Grace Lutheran Church is a historic Evangelical Lutheran Church in America church at 1124 N. 3rd Street in Phoenix, Arizona, United States.

The church as a congregation has been in existence since 1914, making it one of the oldest Lutheran churches in Arizona.

Its building was built in 1928, in the Gothic Revival style.

It is a two-story stone building 80 by 100 feet (24 m × 30 m) in plan. It is divided into bays by buttressed pilasters. It has a rose window, stained glass and lancet windows at the rear, and crenulated parapets.

It was added to the National Register of Historic Places in 1993. Its listing was in accordance with a study of historic church architecture in Phoenix.
