= Sheyenne, North Dakota =

- City
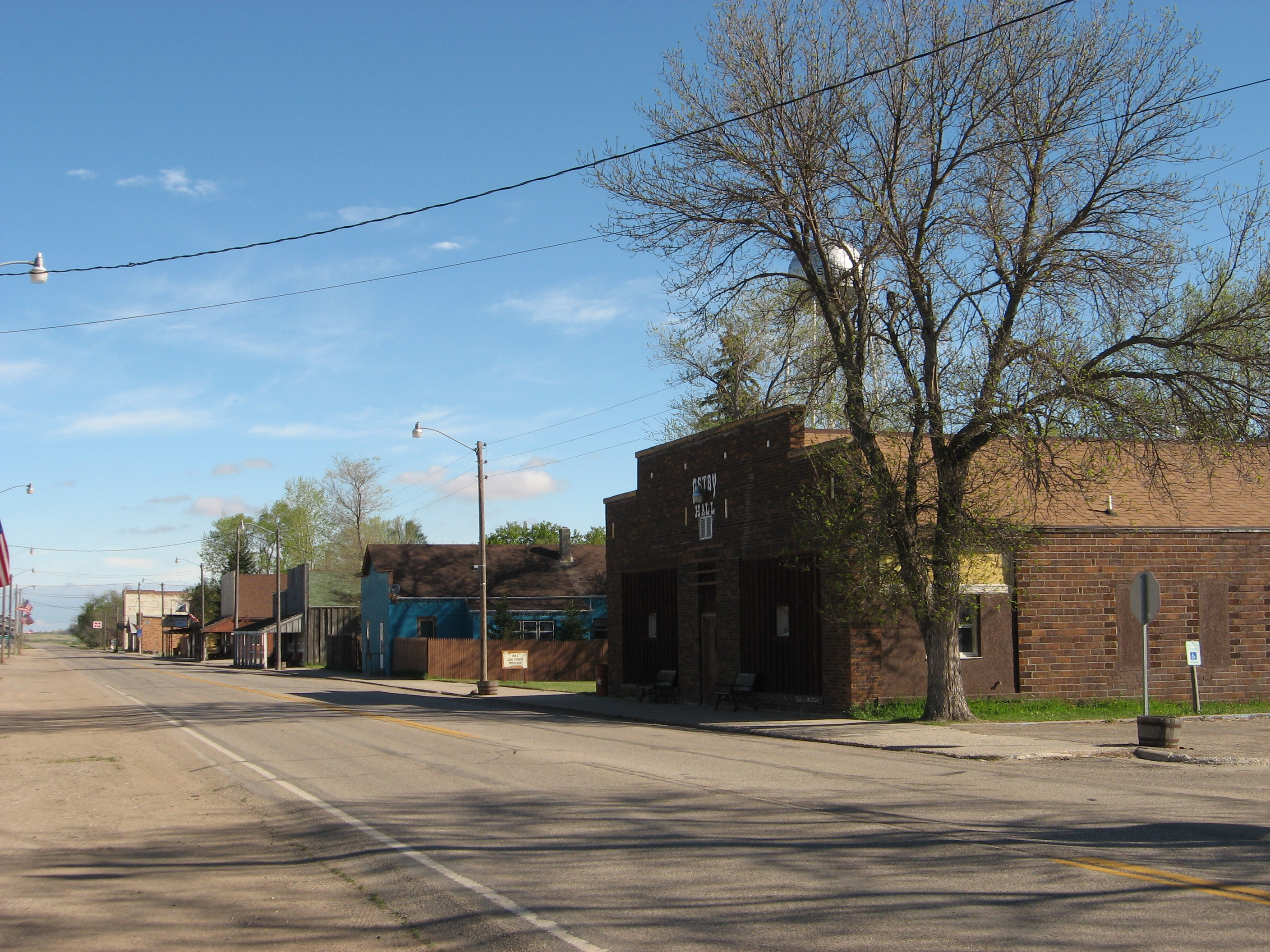
- Looking north on U.S. Route 281
- Motto: Proud To Be A Small Town
- Location of Sheyenne, North Dakota
- Coordinates: 47°49′38″N 99°07′01″W
- Country: United States
- State: North Dakota
- County: Eddy
- Founded: 1883

Government
  - Mayor: Richard Comer

Area
  - Total: 0.15 sq mi (0.39 km^{2})
  - Land: 0.15 sq mi (0.39 km^{2})
  - Water: 0 sq mi (0.00 km^{2})
- Elevation: 1,480 ft (450 m)

Population (2020)
  - Total: 186
  - Estimate (2022): 183
  - Density: 1,241.2/sq mi (479.22/km^{2})
- Time zone: UTC-6 (Central (CST))
  - Summer (DST): UTC-5 (CDT)
- ZIP code: 58374
- Area code: 701
- FIPS code: 38-72580
- GNIS feature ID: 1036262

Sheyenne is a city in Eddy County, North Dakota, United States. The population was 186 at the 2020 census. Sheyenne was founded in 1883. A community center and the Log Cabin Museum are located on Main Street (U.S. Route 281). On the east end of town there is a park with campsites located on Warsing Dam. Sheyenne is also home to two Lutheran churches: Grace Lutheran and First Lutheran.

== History ==
The name "Sheyenne" is derived from the nearby Sheyenne River which was named after the Cheyenne Indians. The first explorers in the area misspelled the name, thus changing the "C" to an "S". Herds of bison once roamed the prairies near the town of Sheyenne. The Sioux tribe were the final Native American tribe to move towards the area. The first white settlers came via the Northern Pacific Railroad Company. The earliest mention of the settlement came through the Grand Forks, North Dakota-based paper, Normadden. The Norwegian language paper mentioned the building of the section house in 1885 and the setting up of six tents in order to establish a townsite and a depot. The main track was laid on November 28, 1884. The railroad began operation to Sheyenne on August 6, 1885.

The main townsite of Sheyenne was obtained by Clarence E. Bennett in 1885, but later came under the jurisdiction of J. W. Richter, who dedicated the townsite in 1892. The first crops grown in the area were common vegetables and as much wheat that the land could take. The main source of meat was hunting on the abundant plains, and the other source was in the Sheyenne River. People streamed into the community from all parts of the United States and Europe. Most European settlers came from Scandinavia and Germany. Businesses flourished off railroad workers and farmers.

=== Fire of 1894 ===
On December 7, 1894 at approximately 4:30 A.M., a fire began in the George Williams Livery Barn and spread to other businesses on Main Street. Williams' billiard room and soft drink shop were the next to be consumed. The blaze then spread to the Westerlund Hotel and the Hugh Peoples General Store. The post office also caught fire, but N.U. Hanson saved all the mail that was on-hand. The fire was determined to be incendiary in origin. George Williams closed his stables at 2:00 A.M. and locked the door. When firemen arrived at the scene, they realized that the door was open, and later it was determined that the fire began in the unused box stall. In the wake of the disaster, the merchants rebuilt and continued serving the Sheyenne area.

Sheyenne was home to C.G. Hayes, a farmer by trade who lived South of the townsite. Hayes became a soldier and was stationed at Fort Totten. He became a scout during the Indian Wars in the Northwest. After that, he served under the Seventh Cavalry banner, and was one of the messengers who sent for reinforcements after The Battle of the Little Bighorn. In 1897, Sheyenne began publishing its first newspaper, The Sheyenne Star.

=== The 1900s ===
Settlers and immigrants continued to swarm to the area as they came via boxcar and train. They also arrived by cars and wagons. Businesses in Sheyenne included numerous department stores, meat markets, livery stables, a depot, a blacksmith shop operated by Hans Stenberg, Odegaard's Shop, a feed mill, and land companies. Sheyenne had several elevators that stored different local goods. There was a Ford dealership, numerous service stations, numerous pharmacies, cafes, a hotel, a public bath, and a lumberyard. A cream station, an opera house, and a variety store also existed in Sheyenne at one time. Many banks have come and gone over the brief period of Sheyenne's existence, including the Farmers' State Bank.

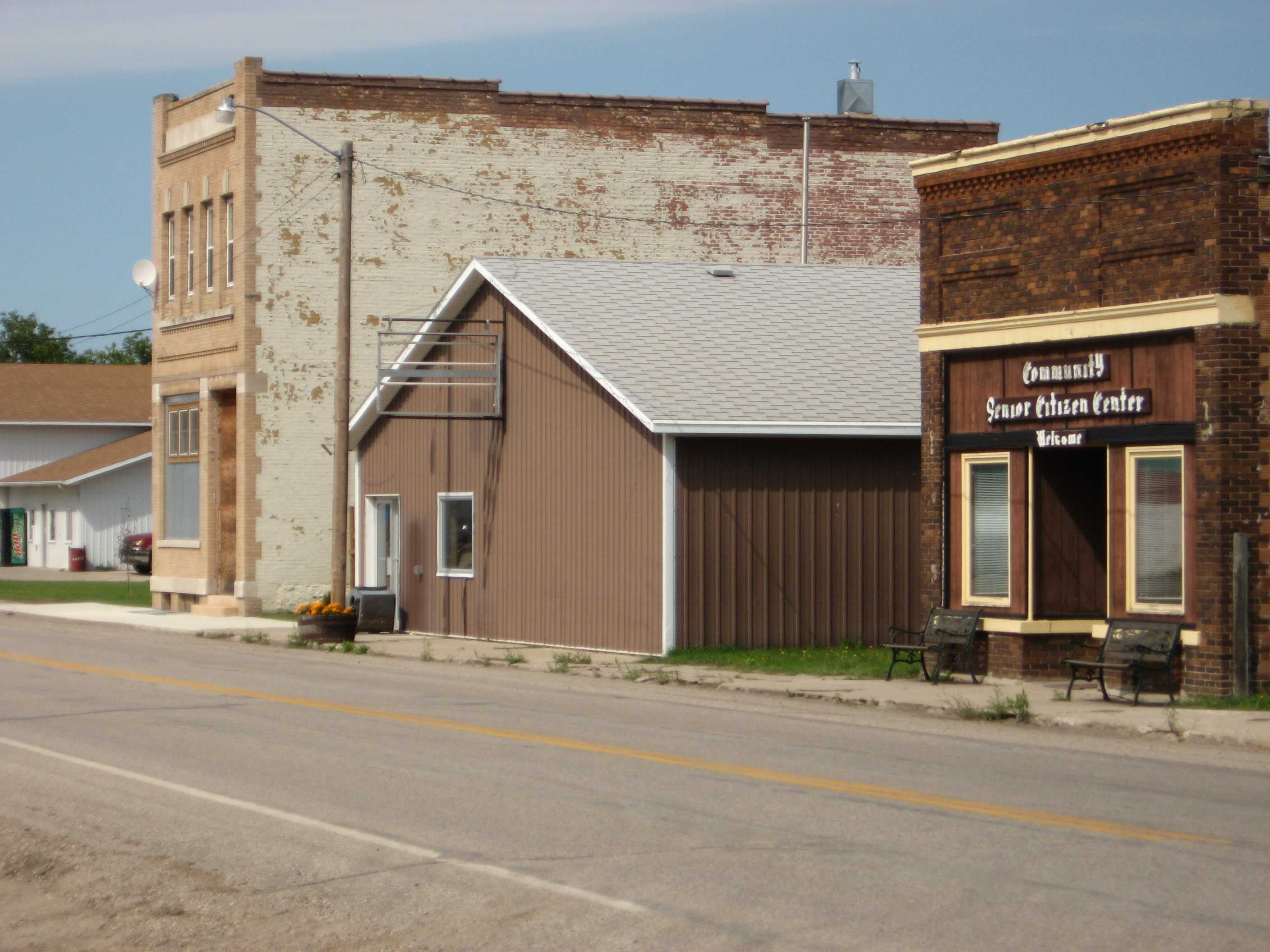
Looking north on Highway 281 in Sheyenne

=== Creamery Day Celebration 1913 ===
The opening of the creamery in Sheyenne was the largest event in Sheyenne history in terms of turnout. The event was created to celebrate the opening of Sheyenne's creamery on June 28, 1913. Over 2000 people were present at the event. The festivities began with a parade that covered 22 blocks that included the Fort Totten Indian Band, the Boy Scouts, and numerous merchants' floats. The parade ended at the creamery, where everyone was served free ice cream and buttermilk. Over 1900 ice cream cones were served. The climax of the day was when Professor G.F. Martin of North Dakota Agricultural College, now North Dakota State University, spoke about the importance of dairy. A baseball game was then played between Sheyenne and New Rockford, and at 9:00 a grand ball was held at the opera house.

=== 1914–present ===
The Sheyenne area progressed through World War I and the 1918 influenza epidemic. A shock to the area came in the 1930s with the Great Depression, when the main industry of the area, agriculture, was threatened severely. Poor crop prices influenced Sheyenne's economy and the WPA was crucial to the life of Sheyenne. It created a park on the south side of Sheyenne that is now owned by the VFW, it restored the town jail, and its workers built Warsing Dam on the outskirts of the city. In the 1940s numerous residents fought in World War II, and the Sheyenne Star ceased publication. In 1955, the second irrigation experimental farm in North Dakota was planned on the land of Bruce Larson, while a major concern of the late 1950s was the high nitrate condition in the wells of Sheyenne. The problem was solved by the Northern Pacific Railway Company donating their well to the City of Sheyenne. A major event in the 1960s was the opening of the Tastee-Freez, a fast food and ice cream restaurant, in the building previously occupied by the city's fire department. Community betterment was the highlight of the 1970s in Sheyenne, when projects such as street paving, tennis courts, townhouses, a museum, and main street revitalization were finished. In 1977 Sheyenne won the North Dakota Community Betterment Award for its work on its projects.

Sheyenne celebrated its 125th with a demo-derby, BBQ dinner, parade, school reunion, fireworks, and a children's theater production, put on by the S.T.A.R.S.

== Geography ==
According to the United States Census Bureau, the city has a total area of 0.16 square miles (0.41 km^{2}), all land.

The city of Sheyenne and its vicinity is located in the distinct Drift Prairie region of North Dakota. The Drift Prairie region is characterized by rolling hills and many sloughs. The main body of water near Sheyenne is the Sheyenne River, but the man-made Warsing Dam is the main source of recreational activity near the city. The area is also in the Devil's Lake Basin region, home to Devil's Lake, the largest natural body of water in the state of North Dakota. South of the city lies the Laurentian Divide, which separates the watersheds of the Arctic Ocean and the Atlantic Ocean.

=== Climate ===
Sheyenne experiences an extreme Continental climate. It experiences wide temperature changes and four distinct seasons. Its location in the center of North America and the Upper Midwest gives it distinctive upper air patterns that vary dramatically from season to season.

According to the United States Census Bureau, the city has a total area of 0.2 square miles (0.52 km^{2}), all land.

== Demographics ==
Historical population
Census	Pop.	Note	%±
1930	417		—
1940	431		3.4%
1950	469		8.8%
1960	423		−9.8%
1970	362		−14.4%
1980	307		−15.2%
1990	272		−11.4%
2000	318		16.9%
2010	204		−35.8%
2020	186		−8.8%
2022 (est.)	183		−1.6%
U.S. Decennial Census; 2020 Census

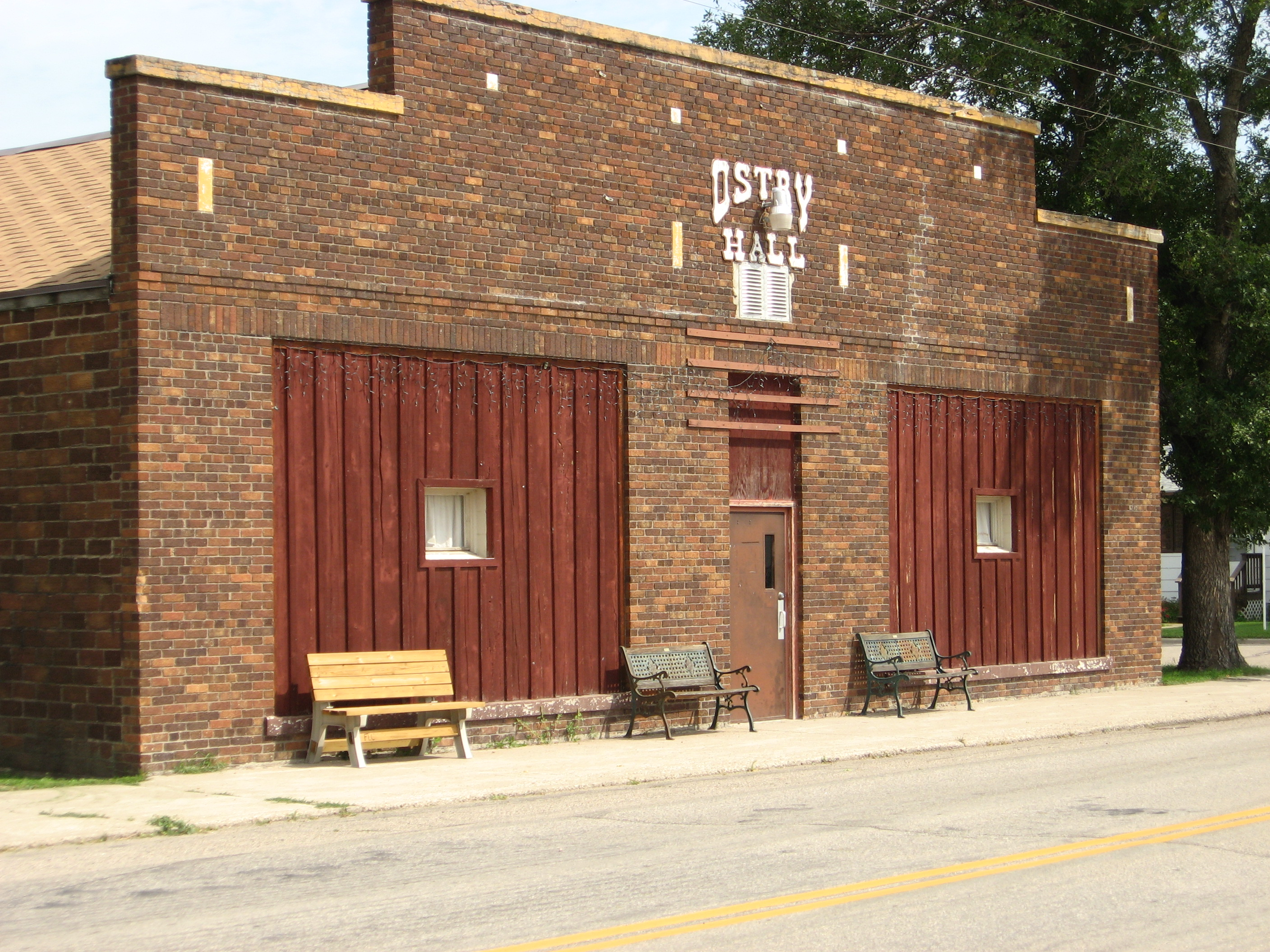
The Ostby Hall- Community Activities

=== 2010 census ===
As of the census of 2010, there were 204 people, 103 households, and 51 families residing in the city. The population density was 1,275.0 inhabitants per square mile (492.3/km^{2}). There were 147 housing units at an average density of 918.8 per square mile (354.8/km^{2}). The racial makeup of the city was 81.4% White, 1.0% African American, 14.7% Native American, 0.5% from other races, and 2.5% from two or more races. Hispanic or Latino of any race were 1.0% of the population.

There were 103 households, of which 11.7% had children under the age of 18 living with them, 37.9% were married couples living together, 7.8% had a female householder with no husband present, 3.9% had a male householder with no wife present, and 50.5% were non-families. 41.7% of all households were made up of individuals, and 21.4% had someone living alone who was 65 years of age or older. The average household size was 1.98 and the average family size was 2.73.

The median age in the city was 54.3 years. 12.3% of residents were under the age of 18; 4.9% were between the ages of 18 and 24; 18.1% were from 25 to 44; 40.2% were from 45 to 64; and 24.5% were 65 years of age or older. The gender makeup of the city was 49.5% male and 50.5% female.

=== 2000 census ===
As of the census of 2000, there were 318 people, 146 households, and 85 families residing in the city. The population density was 2,042.1 inhabitants per square mile (788.5/km^{2}). There were 187 housing units at an average density of 1,200.9 per square mile (463.7/km^{2}). The racial makeup of the city was 83.96% White, 12.26% Native American, and 3.77% from two or more races.

There were 146 households, out of which 26.7% had children under the age of 18 living with them, 50.0% were married couples living together, 6.2% had a female householder with no husband present, and 41.1% were non-families. 39.7% of all households were made up of individuals, and 26.0% had someone living alone who was 65 years of age or older. The average household size was 2.18 and the average family size was 2.94.

In the city, the population was spread out, with 23.9% under the age of 18, 7.2% from 18 to 24, 19.2% from 25 to 44, 25.5% from 45 to 64, and 24.2% who were 65 years of age or older. The median age was 45 years. For every 100 females, there were 80.7 males. For every 100 females age 18 and over, there were 80.6 males.

The median income for a household in the city was $22,969, and the median income for a family was $30,938. Males had a median income of $25,972 versus $24,583 for females. The per capita income for the city was $16,145. About 10.7% of families and 12.3% of the population were below the poverty line, including 20.3% of those under age 18 and 4.5% of those age 65 or over.

== Sites of interest ==
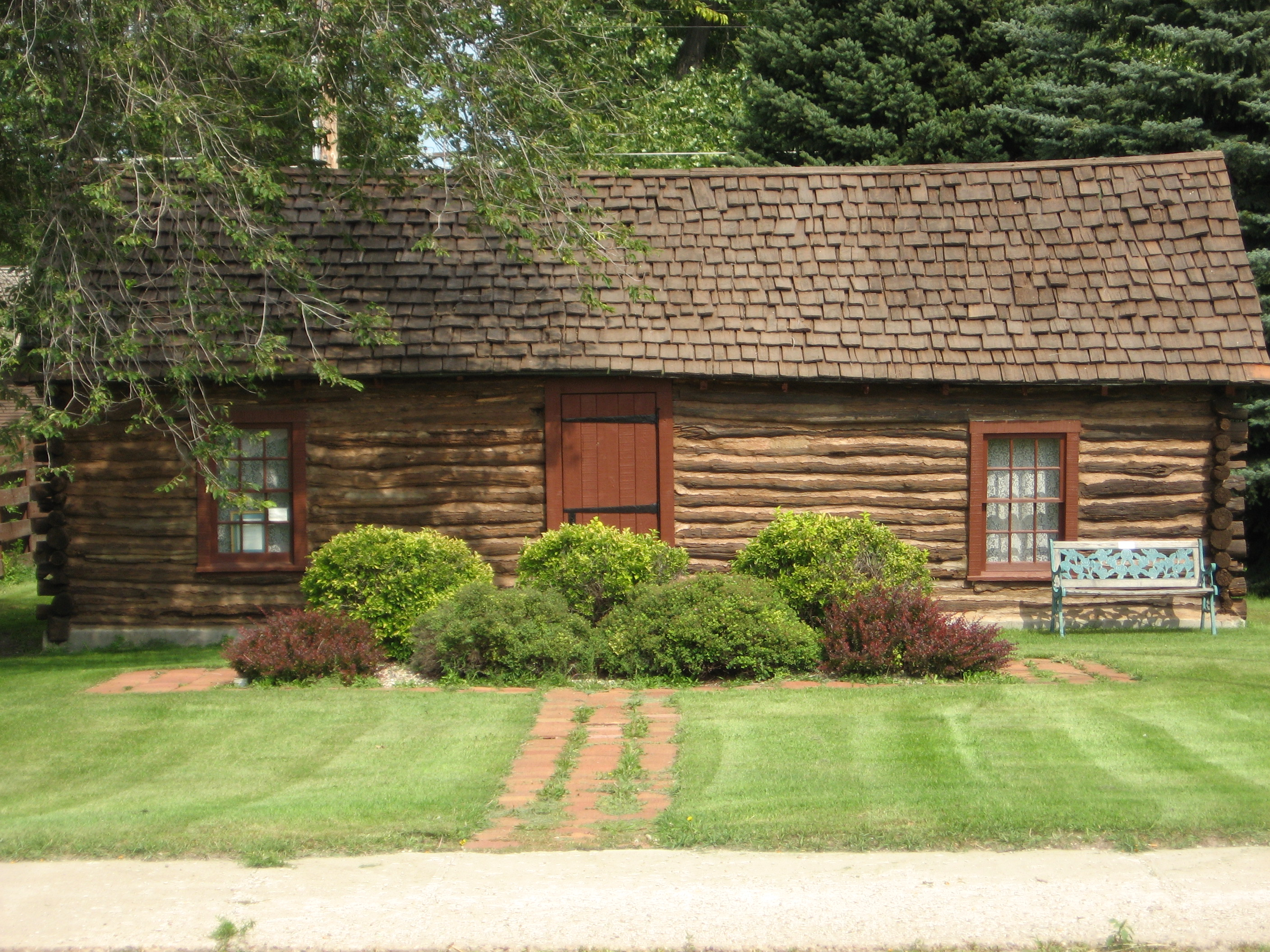
The Log Cabin Museum on Main Street, built in 1867

- Log Cabin Museum is a pioneer museum showcasing the history of the Sheyenne area. The building was built in 1867 near Fort Totten, North Dakota. It was brought to Sheyenne as part of a community betterment program in the 1970s and was expanded soon after. The original woodwork can be seen in the cabin today. The Log Cabin Museum contains many historic items from the area such as a barber chair, Sheyenne Star newspapers, and articles of clothing owned by John Aasen—one of the tallest actors in history. It also shows off many Native American artifacts that were found in the region. There is also a Japanese rifle from World War II on display at the museum.
- Warsing Dam is a man-made dam on the eastern side of Sheyenne featuring camping and fishing.

== Education ==
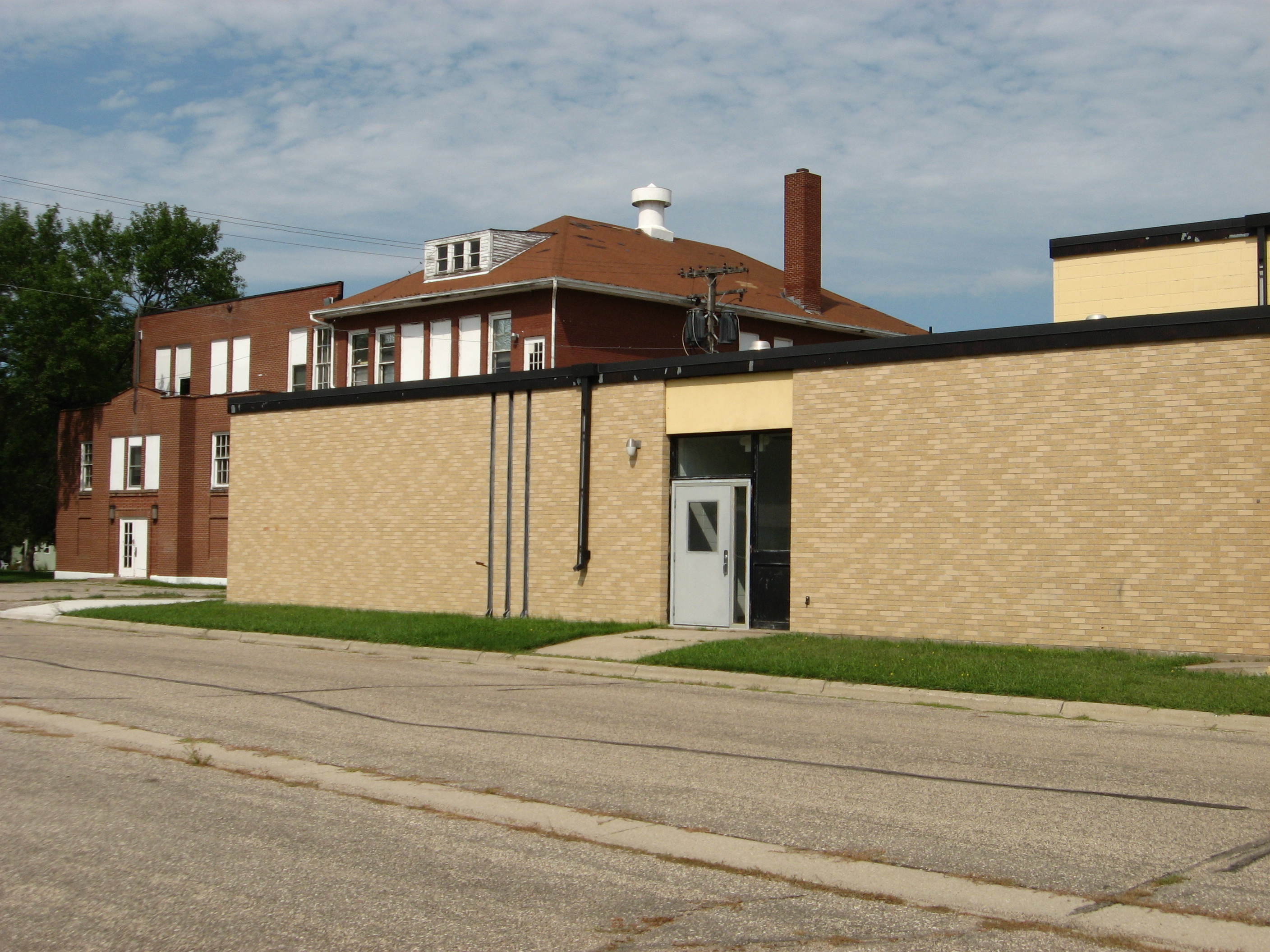
The old Sheyenne School, showing the first original (1908) building and additions from 1930 and 1962

Before the first Sheyenne school was built, classes in 1886 were held in a sod house, but soon a wood-frame building was built west of the Sheyenne's railroad tracks. The first school in Sheyenne was moved to Richter Avenue, and when it became too small, it became the office for the Sheyenne Star newspaper. In 1897, a two-story schoolhouse was built, and the first floor could be used for school purposes only, whereas the second floor could be used for meetings and church services. In 1898, school was closed for two weeks due to an outbreak of scarlet fever and measles. In the first months of 1903, many pupils left the Sheyenne school to attend Scandinavian Studies in Greenfield Township. In April 1903, school was prohibited due to a smallpox outbreak. In 1908, a new school was built on the eastern side of Sheyenne and in 1930, an addition was made to the two-story brick building. In the late 1950s, it was decided to add on once again. While the project was in progress, the Ostby Hall and Grace Lutheran Church were used as overflow classrooms. In 1962, the project was completed. The Sheyenne High School lasted for 99 years until the spring of 2007, when it closed for its pupils. Today, most children living in and around Sheyenne attend school in nearby New Rockford because Sheyenne is part of the New Rockford-Sheyenne Public School.

== Notable person ==
- John Aasen, silent film actor known as the "Norwegian Boy Giant"
