= Grace Lutheran Church of Barber =

Historic church in Montana, United States

- U.S. National Register of Historic Places
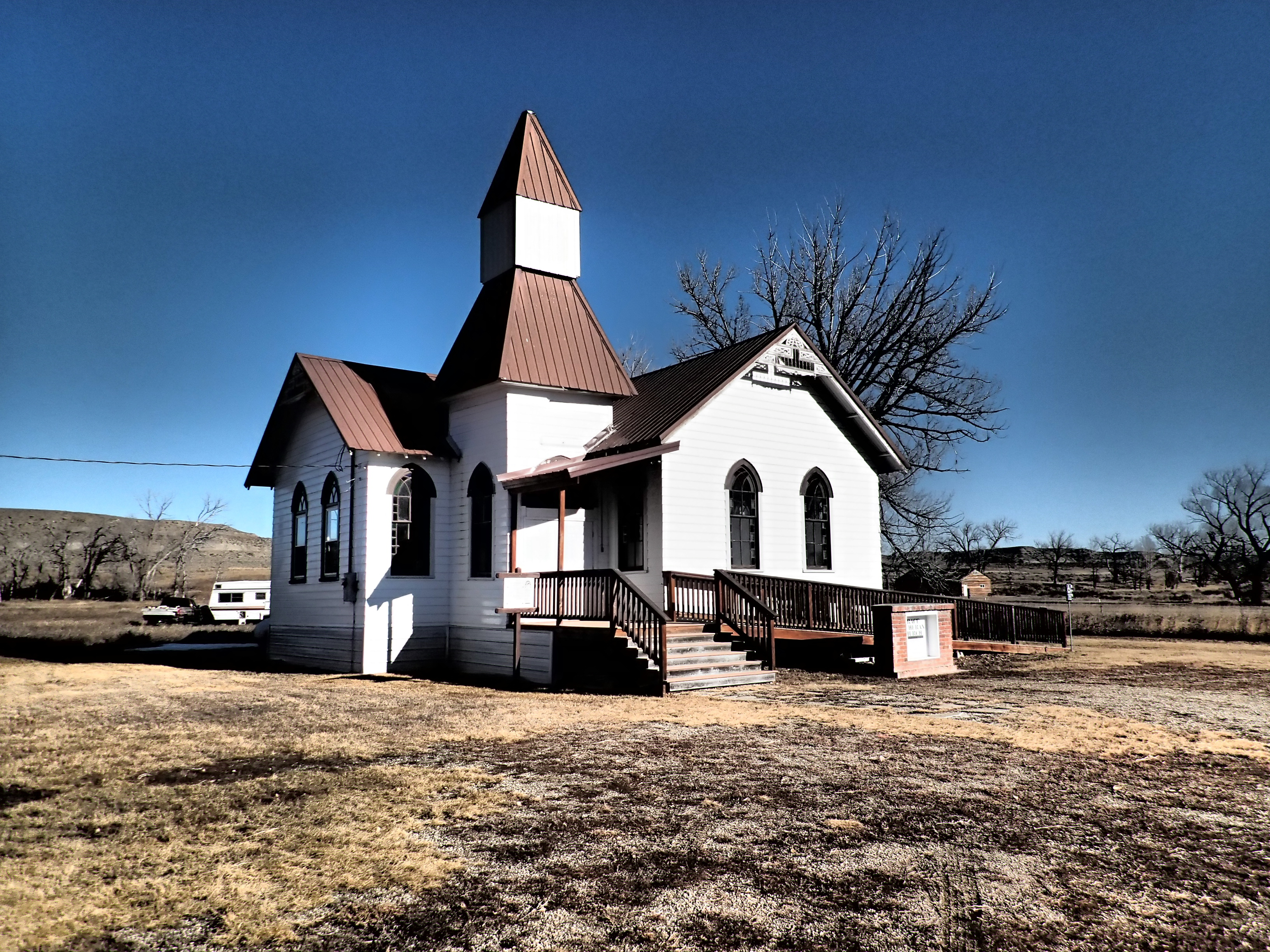

- Location within Montana Location within the United States
- Location: West of Ryegate
- Coordinates: 46°18′51″N 109°23′04″W
- NRHP reference No.: 82003171
- Added to NRHP: February 1, 1982

Grace Lutheran Church of Barber is a site on the National Register of Historic Places in Golden Valley County, Montana. The church was added to the Register on February 1, 1982.

Grace Lutheran Church is located on U.S. Route 12 approximately seven miles west of the town of Ryegate. Grace Lutheran of Barber was organized in 1911. Methodists built the church at Barber in 1917. The wooden structure was shared by both Methodist and Lutheran congregations for many years. In 1927, the Lutheran congregation purchased the church and the Methodist congregation relocated to Ryegate. The church is still being used for religious services.
