= Get Out and Get Under =

1920 film by Hal Roach

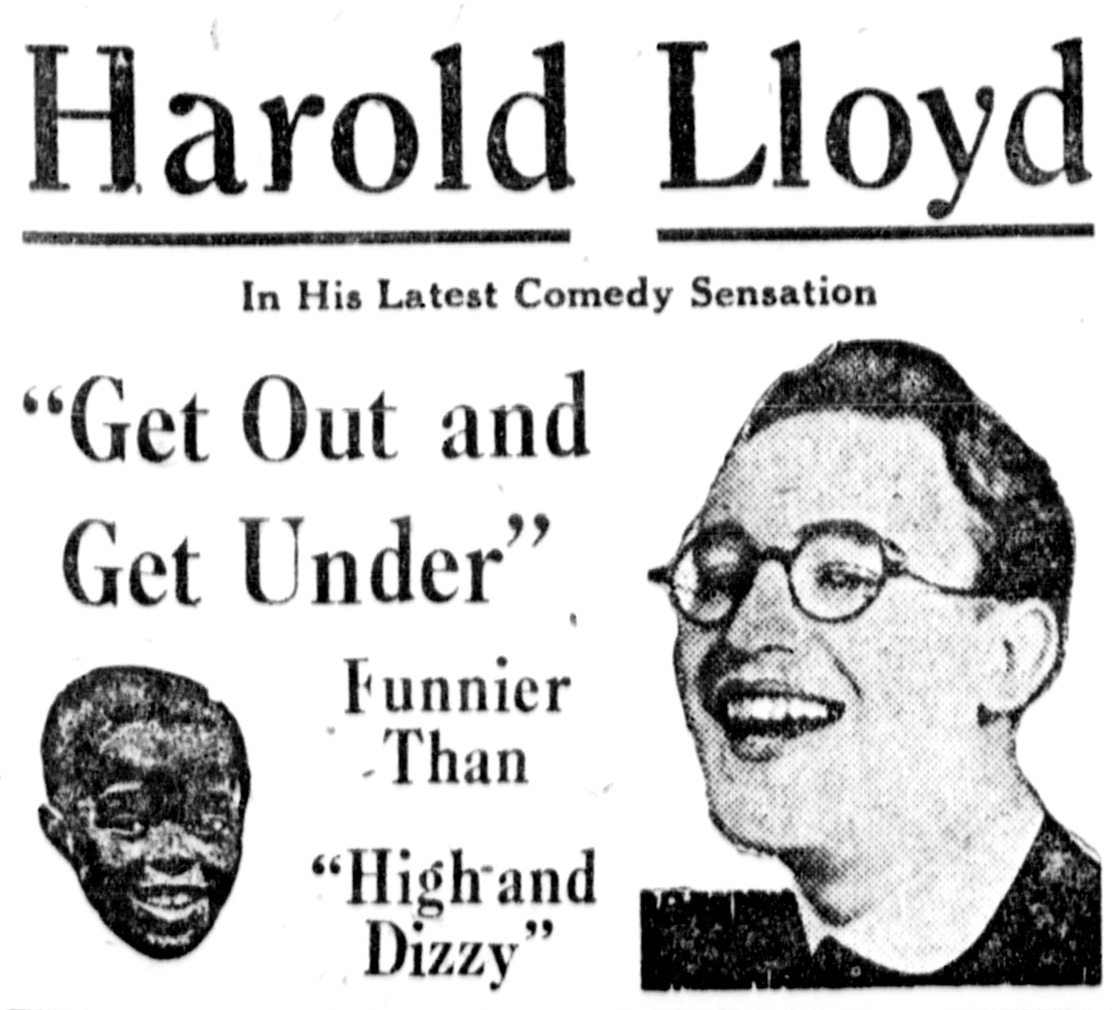
- Newspaper advertisement.
- Directed by: Hal Roach
- Written by: H. M. Walker
- Produced by: Hal Roach
- Starring: Harold Lloyd
- Cinematography: Walter Lundin
- Distributed by: Pathé Exchange
- Release date: September 12, 1920
- Running time: 25 minutes
- Country: United States
- Language: Silent (English intertitles)

Get Out and Get Under is a 1920 American silent comedy film directed by Hal Roach and starring Harold Lloyd and Mildred Davis.

The car in the movie, to which Lloyd was alternately devoted or frustrated, appears to be a 1920 Ford Model T.

The film's title may be a reference to the 1913 song, "He'd Have to Get Under – Get Out and Get Under (to lyrics) which was used in the movie.

== Plot ==
Get Out and Get Under (1920)

The Boy has a dream in which he learns that his sweetheart is marrying another man that very afternoon. Intending to stop the wedding, The Boy arrives at the church only to see the newly wedded couple emerge. The crestfallen Boy wakes up. He telephones The Girl to make sure he was only dreaming. The Girl confirms this, but she is upset that The Boy has not yet arrived to play an important role as a masked swordsman at an amateur theatrical that she is producing. The Boy gets his prized automobile from storage and encounters numerous difficulties in trying to get to the theater on time for the performance. With The Boy still absent, The Girl replaces The Boy with another actor. The Boy arrives in costume just as the play concludes, but he comes onto the stage to accept the audience's cheers.

== Cast ==
- Harold Lloyd as The Boy
- Mildred Davis as The Girl
- Fred McPherson as The Rival
- Roy Brooks (uncredited)
- William Gillespie as Dope Fiend (uncredited)
- Wallace Howe as Wedding Guest (uncredited)
- Gaylord Lloyd (uncredited)
- Ernie Morrison as Small Boy (uncredited)
- Charles Stevenson (uncredited)
- Frank Terry (uncredited)

== Reception ==
CineMagazine rated the film 4 stars.

== See also ==
- Harold Lloyd filmography
