= High and Dizzy =

1920 film by Hal Roach

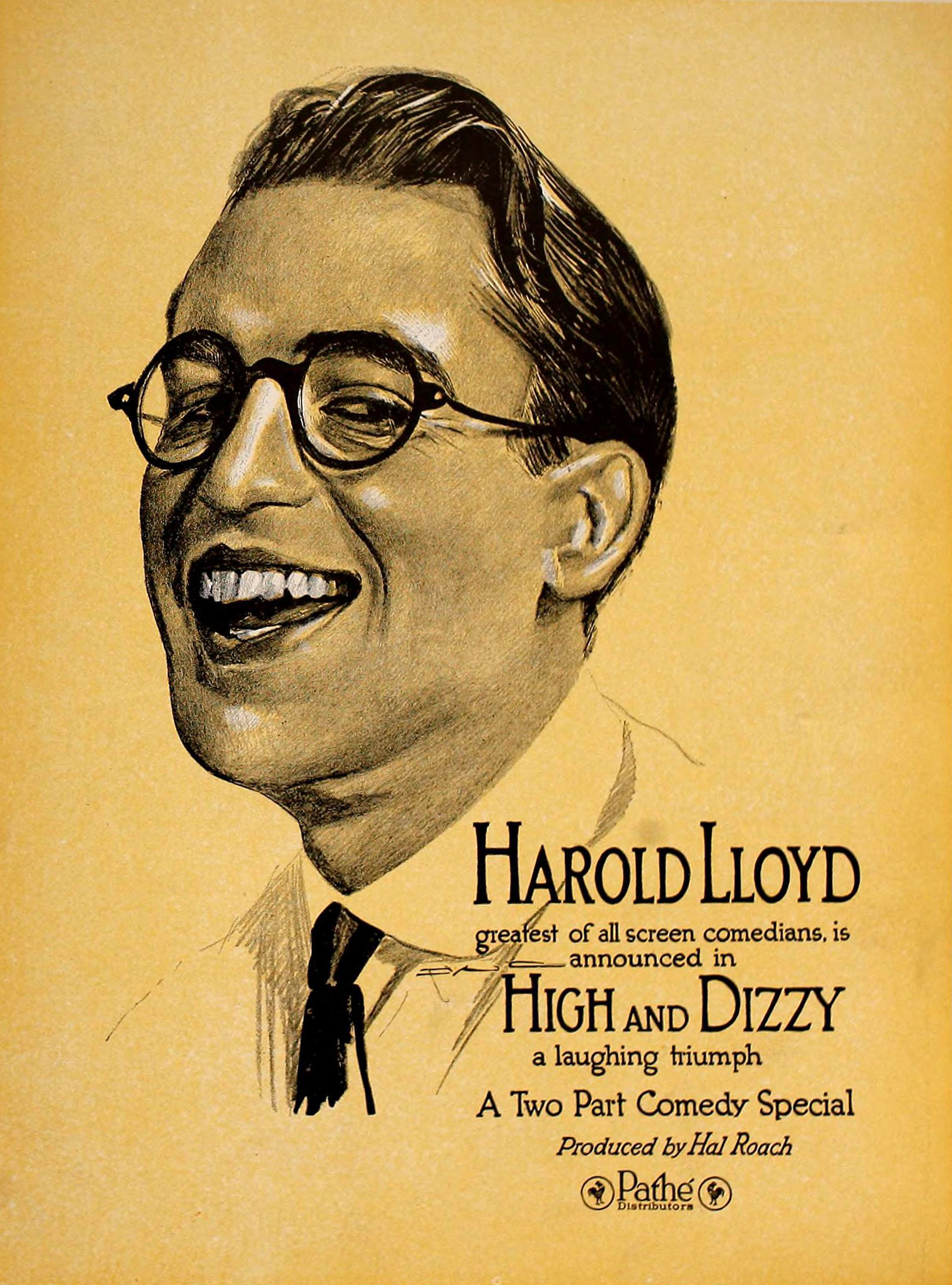
- Directed by: Hal Roach
- Written by: Frank Terry; H.M. Walker
- Produced by: Hal Roach
- Starring: Harold Lloyd
- Cinematography: Walter Lundin
- Distributed by: Pathé Exchange
- Release date: July 11, 1920
- Running time: 26 minutes
- Country: United States
- Language: Silent (English intertitles)

High and Dizzy (1920)

High and Dizzy is a 1920 American short comedy film starring Harold Lloyd.

== Plot ==
The film revolves around a young woman who sleepwalks and the doctor who is attempting to treat her. The climactic scene involves the young woman sleepwalking precariously on the outside ledge of a tall building, anticipating Lloyd's more famous skyscraper-scaling scenes in Safety Last! (1923). A subplot has Lloyd and his friend getting inebriated on homemade liquor and then trying to avoid a prohibition-era policeman who pursues them for being drunk.

== Cast ==
- Harold Lloyd as the boy
- Mildred Davis as the girl
- Roy Brooks as his friend
- Wallace Howe as her father
- William Gillespie (uncredited)
- Mark Jones as hotel bellboy number 2 (uncredited)
- Gaylord Lloyd (uncredited)
- Charles Stevenson as Police officer (uncredited)
- Noah Young as man who breaks hotel room door (uncredited)

== See also ==
- Harold Lloyd filmography
