= Number, Please? (film) =

1920 film by Hal Roach, Fred C. Newmeyer

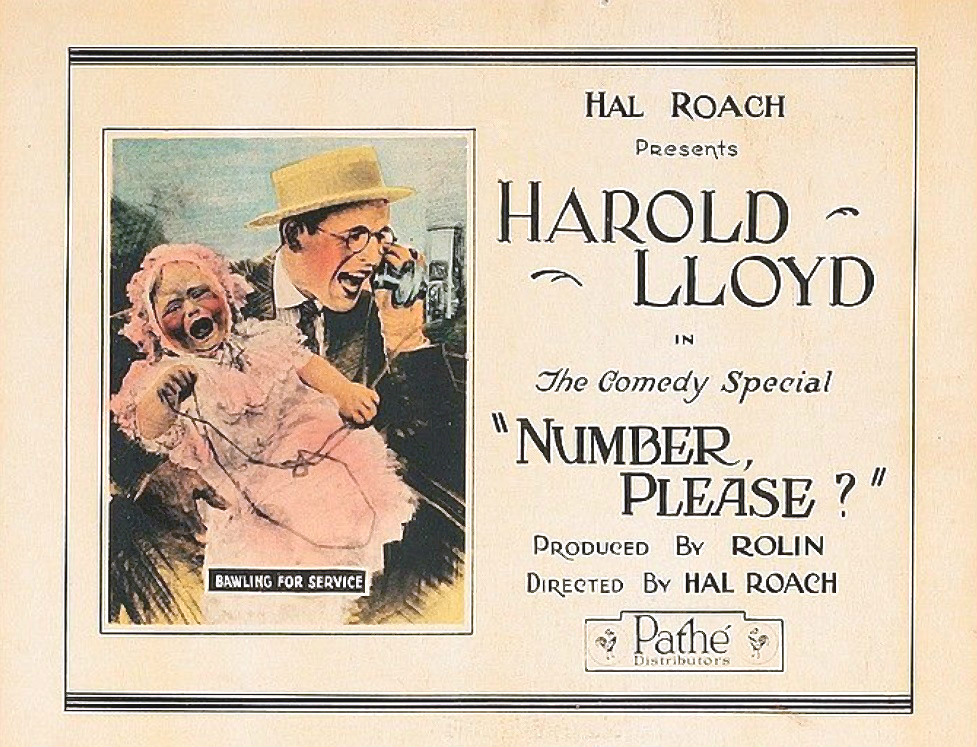
- Lobby card for the film
- Directed by: Hal Roach; Fred C. Newmeyer
- Written by: H. M. Walker (titles)
- Produced by: Hal Roach
- Starring: Harold Lloyd
- Cinematography: Walter Lundin
- Distributed by: Pathé Exchange
- Release date: December 26, 1920 (United States)
- Running time: 23 minutes
- Country: United States
- Language: Silent (English intertitles)

Number, Please? is a 1920 American short comedy film directed by Hal Roach and Fred C. Newmeyer featuring Harold Lloyd.

== Plot ==
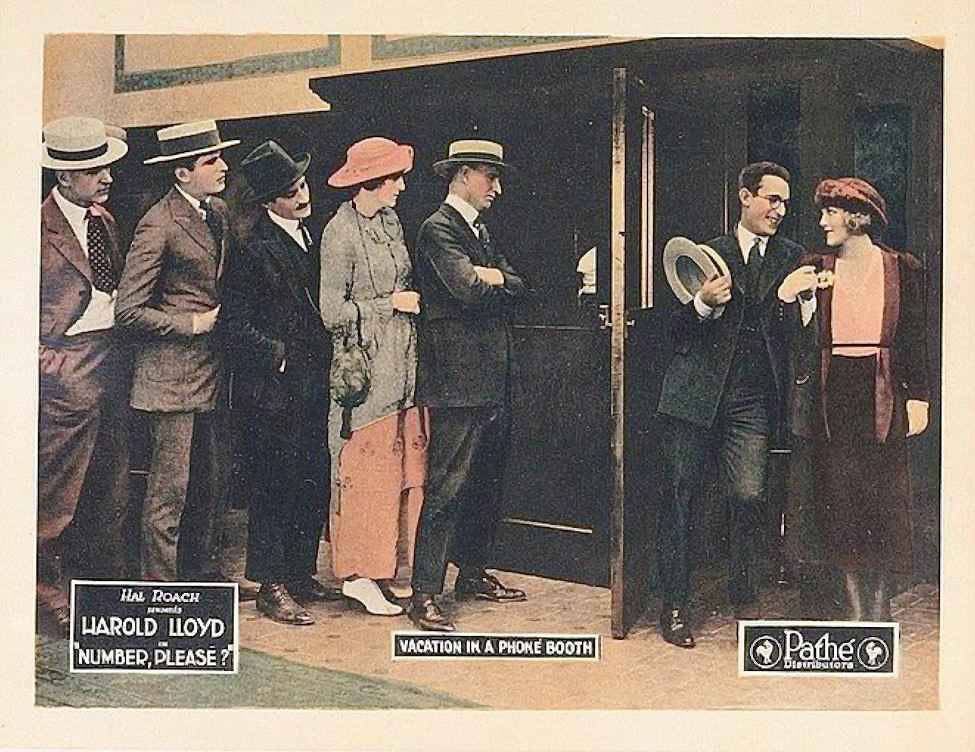
Lobby card

While at an amusement park, trying vainly to forget the girl he has lost, a young man (Lloyd) sees the girl (Mildred Davis) with her new boyfriend (Roy Brooks). When her dog gets loose in the park, both suitors have to help her catch it. The girl's uncle, a balloonist, gives her a pass for two in his balloon, provided that her mother approves. She then offers to take along the first of her admirers who is able to get her mother's consent. The girl's new boyfriend races to her house to get the mother's permission, while the young man tries to telephone her. The young man faces crowded phone booths, gossiping operators, a crying baby and other obstacles in his effort to reach the mother first. Racing back to the girl, the two suitors bump into one another and a pickpocket who has just robbed the girl of her purse. The boy is mistaken for the pickpocket and must elude various policemen on his way back to meet the girl.

== Cast ==
- Harold Lloyd as The Boy
- Mildred Davis as The Girl
- Roy Brooks as The Rival
- Sammy Brooks as Little Man in Telephone Booth (uncredited)
- William Gillespie as Cop (uncredited)
- Hal Roach as Sailor (uncredited)
- Wallace Howe as Man on Rollercoaster / Man at Phone Booth (uncredited)
- Mark Jones as Man on bench stealing purse (uncredited)
- Gaylord Lloyd as Man Managing Game Booth (uncredited)
- Ernie Morrison as Little Boy with Whisk Broom (uncredited)
- Charles Stevenson as Cop / Man on Rollercoaster (uncredited)

== See also ==
- Harold Lloyd filmography
