= Luring Shadows =

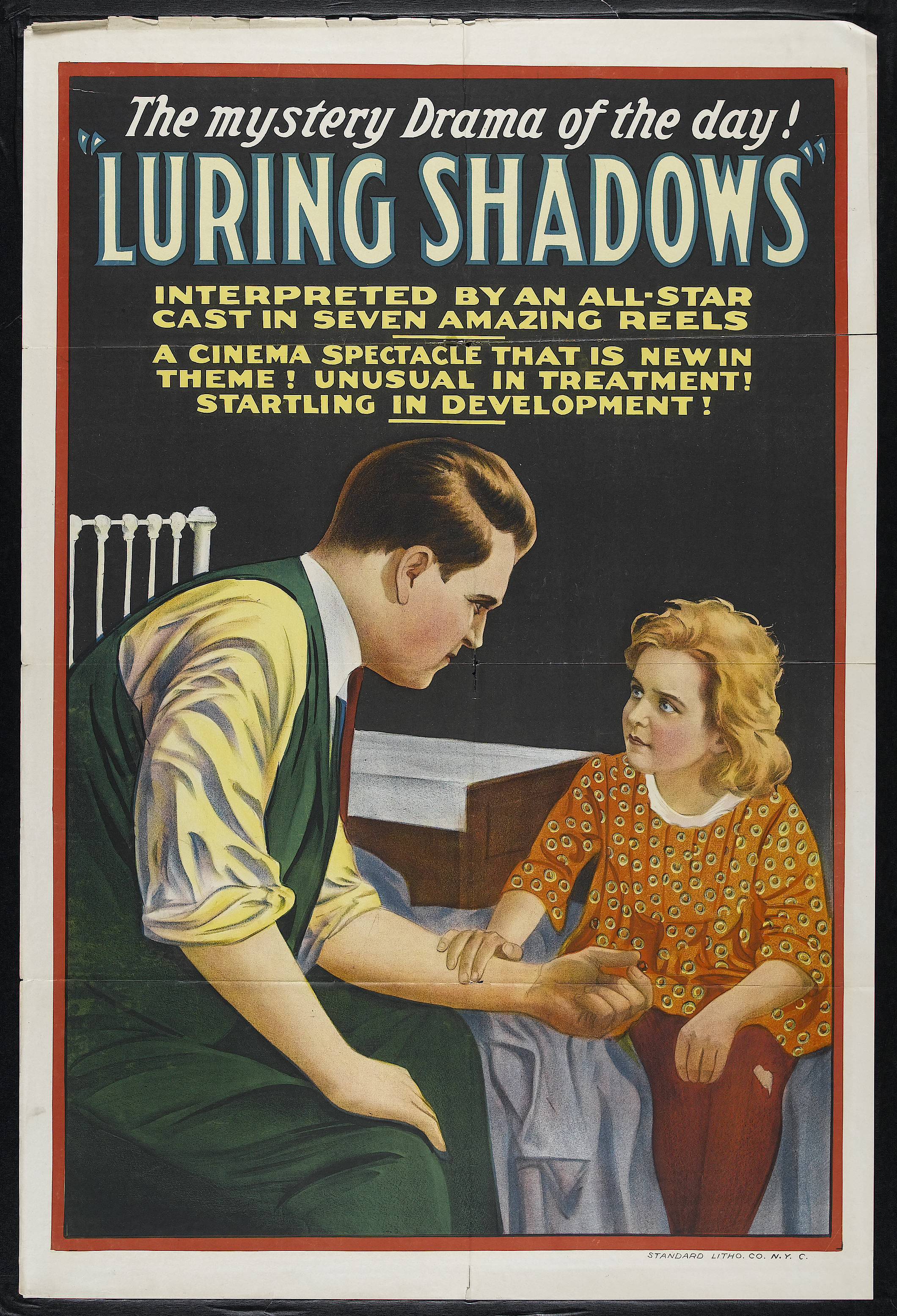
- Directed by: Joseph Levering
- Screenplay by: O.E. Goebel; Condé B. Pallen
- Starring: Aida Horton
- Production companies: Catholic Art Association; Inter-Ocean Film Corporation
- Release date: October 1920
- Language: English

Luring Shadows is a silent 1920 American religious mystery film directed by Joseph Levering and written by Oscar E. Goebel and Condé B. Pallen. It was produced by the now defunct Catholic Art Association (not to be mistaken for the current Catholic Art Association) and Inter-Ocean Film Corporation, and stars Aida Horton. The film was the Catholic Art Association's fifth and second-to-last cinematic production.

== Plot ==
J.H. Wareing, a New York City financier, is found murdered in his library after the robbery of several securities and a necklace. Suspicion points to the butler, Jason, to whom Wareing had shown the necklace the night before. Wareing's daughter, Florence, is also a suspect and therefore denied her father's estate.

Over the course of the investigation, Wareing's daughter Florence works with a little girl named Mary (Aida Horton) who lives with a professional burglar named Bill, another suspect. Dr. Barton, the family's physician, arranges a séance to identify the murderer. When Barton sees the ghost of Wareing, he betrays his own guild and is arrested. The Wareing estate is returned to Florence, who marries Stanley Carter, an attorney at her father's bank.

== Release ==
Luring Shadow was released in October 1921. After an initial theatrical release, the film was shown at various Catholic churches as an examination of the legitimacy of spiritualism.

== Reception ==
The Edwardsville [Illinois] Intelligencer applauded the film's attempts to disprove spiritualism, which had a growing following the carnage of World War I. The paper's wrote that:

People the world over are duped and deceived by spiritualists, who pretend to possess the secret of obtaining communication with the spirits of the dead. Luring Shadows gives inside information on the nature and identity of these so-called spirits; it shows how people are deceived. Some people pay fancy sums to learn from personal experience how deceitful Spiritualism is. You can save the fancy sum and learn the lesson just as well by seeing the Luring Shadows...

The Dunkirk [New York] Evening Observer called the film a "masterpiece" featuring "Perfect photography, superb acting, [and] beautiful settings." It recommended the film to viewers of all ages.
