= Monella Street =

1920 film

- Directed by: Umberto Fracchia
- Starring: Carmen Boni
- Cinematography: Cesare Cavagna
- Production company: Nova Film
- Distributed by: Nova Film
- Release date: November 1920
- Country: Italy
- Languages: Silent; Italian intertitles

Monella Street (Italian: Monella di strada) is a 1920 Italian silent directed by Umberto Fracchia and starring Carmen Boni.

== Cast ==
- Carmen Boni
- Romano Calò
- Lia Liasche
- Margherita Losanges
- Pietro Pezzullo

== Bibliography ==
- Stewart, John. Italian film: a who's who. McFarland, 1994.
