= Gribiche (film) =

1926 film

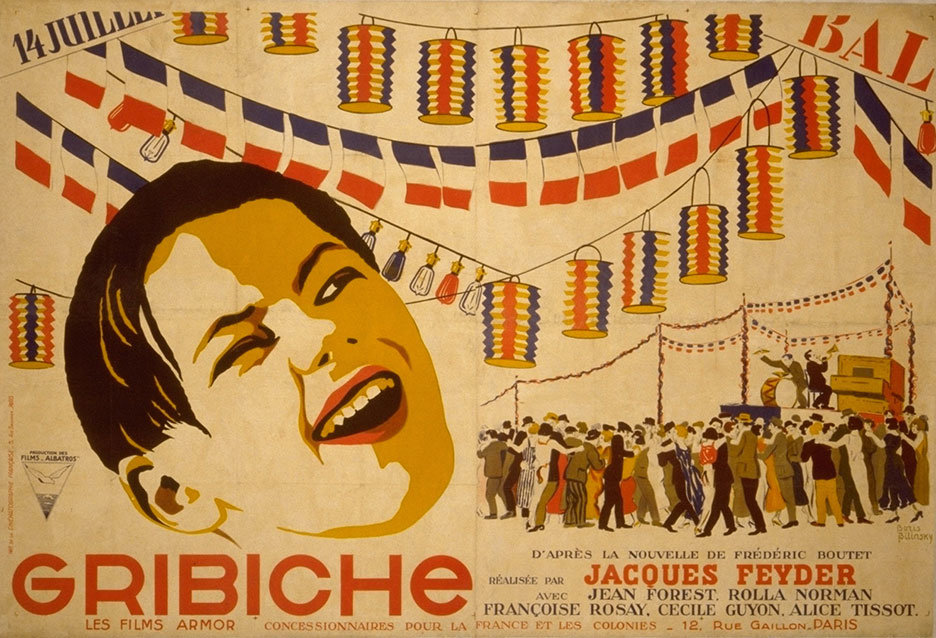
- Poster by Boris Bilinsky
- Directed by: Jacques Feyder
- Written by: Frédéric Boutet (novel); Jacques Feyder
- Produced by: Alexandre Kamenka
- Starring: Jean Forrest; Françoise Rosay; Rolla Norman
- Cinematography: Maurice Desfassiaux; Maurice Forster
- Production company: Films Albatros
- Release date: 2 April 1926
- Running time: 153 minutes
- Country: France
- Languages: Silent film French intertitles

Gribiche is a 1926 French silent film directed by Jacques Feyder based on the eponymous short story by writer Frédéric Boutet.

== Plot ==
Gribiche (1926)

In a Paris department store where he had gone to buy something for his mother, a young boy, Gribiche, finds a handbag that a lady has just lost. He gives it back to her and refuses the reward she wants to give him. At her request, he gives her his name and address. Gribiche lives with his mother, a young widow of war and factory worker, in a small apartment in the popular neighbourhood of Grenelle. The lady, Edith Maranet, the American widow of a French diplomat, belongs to high society. She lives in luxury but devotes herself to works of social hygiene and runs a nursery where she holds conferences. During an outing to a funfair with his mother and the foreman of the factory, Gribiche understands that he has become an obstacle to their marriage. The next morning, the lady, Edith Maranet, offers to Gribiche's mother to adopt the boy and give him the education he deserves. The mother is convinced Gribiche will refuse, but to her surprise, he agrees.

Gribiche then discovers another universe: a big mansion in the select neighbourhood of Auteuil furnished in the fashionable Art Déco style; and a strict daily schedule, surrounded by hostile servants and private teachers. Waking up at 6:30, bath, boxing, shower, lunch, manicure, math, French and English lessons, and walk to the park. Edith Maranet loves telling her friends how she has saved the child, retelling the story of their encounter, every time with more exaggeration. Cut off from his family, his friends and street life, Gribiche gets bored except when he can take refuge in the garage, where he learns about mechanics from the lady's chauffeur. He is particularly depressed when he finds out in a letter from his mother that she has remarried with the foreman without inviting him to the wedding.

On 14 July, the French National Day (Bastille Day), frustrated at being unable to attend the popular celebrations because Edith Maranet thinks they are "anti-hygienic activities", Gribiche escapes and returns to Grenelle where his mother and her new husband warmly welcome him. Edith, disappointed by what she believes to be ingratitude, writes to her brother that "only collective charity is good, individual charity is disheartening, false and unfair". When Gribiche comes to thank her with his mother, she at first refuses to see them, but thanks to the chauffeur's intercession, forgives Gribiche and offers money for his education.

== Cast ==
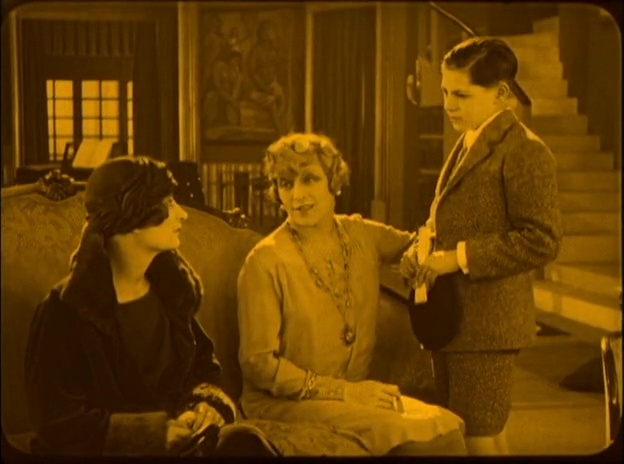
C. Guyon, F. Rosay & J. Forest

- Jean Forrest as Antoine Belot, nicknamed Gribiche
- Françoise Rosay as Edith Maranet
- Rolla Norman as Philippe Gavary
- Cécile Guyon as Anna Belot
- Alice Tissot as the English teacher
- Charles Barrois as Marcelin
- Andrée Canti as the housekeeper
- Armand Dufour as the chauffeur

== Production ==
In May 1925, Jacques Feyder, who had just finished shooting Das Bilnis (The Image), met Alexandre Kamenka, the creator of the company Films Albatros, with whom he signed a contract for the making of a feature film. It is the fifth film of the director and the first he made for the company of the "Russian colony" in Paris, which brought together, around Kamenka, producers, directors, actors and technicians emigrated in France after the October Revolution. His attention was brought by his wife, actress Françoise Rosay, who had already been his assistant for Faces of Children, to the short story Gribiche by Frédéric Boutet. Feyder followed her advice and decided to choose her for the main role, which would be the beginning of her successful career as actress. For the part of the little boy, Feyder cast again Jean Forrest, a young boy he had discovered on the streets of Montmartre and whom he had already chosen as the main child actor in Crainquebille and Faces of Children.

The shooting took place in 1925 and Feyder could rely on the expertise of two excellent in-house cinematographers, Maurice Desfassiaux and Maurice Forster who will realise in particular remarkable nocturnal views in the light of street lights for the scenes shot on location in Paris. After Gribiche, Jacques Feyder, will realise two more features for Films Albatros, Carmen in 1926 and The New Gentlemen in 1928 with the same cinematographers.

The indoor scenes were shot at the Montreuil studio of Films Albatros, with impressive sets in the Art Déco style, designed by scenic designer Lazare Meerson, which evoke the Stoclet Palace built in Brussels between 1905 and 1911 by architect Josef Hoffmann. Great attention was brought to the details of the decoration and the opening credits refer in particular to furniture and crystals by Louis Sue and André Mare and silverware by Jean Puiforcat.

== Reception ==
The film was originally a public success but has been less successful with critics than other films by Feyder. Sadoul dismisses it for excess of sentimentalism. Mitry considers that the film only highlights the aggressive modernism of Süe and Mare and deplores the excessive lengthening of a misplaced plot in the unnecessary development of scenes without purpose. Blom praises the detailed descriptions of working class life but considers that the abundance of these descriptions could have a boring effect, which would explain the lack of success of the film.

Albéra on the other hand considers that the importance of the film is to illustrate the difference between the lives of Edith Maranet and Anna Belot which according to him is cultural - American culture versus French popular culture - rather than social - bourgeoisie versus working class. Melon regards Gribiche as a particularly representative example of the allegorist trend of French Cinema in the 1920s. It depicts social classes in a very nuanced way, far from the usual stereotypes and includes a pedagogical dimension involving a judicious use and an elaborate articulation of visual signs, inviting the viewer to look differently at class culture. While adopting the form of a melodrama, the film goes beyond this genre in two ways: it is a biting satire of bourgeois society, the vanity and hypocrisy of which it denounces, and it shows a fair and subtle picture of popular culture and of the working class way of life. However Melon acknowledges that what must have appeared clearly to the 1926 spectator can only be grasped today through an exegesis of the film, as cultural conventions have changed.

== Preservation status ==
The film has been restored by the Cinémathèque Française in collaboration with the Fonds Culturel Franco-Américain. In 1958, the Cinémathèque Française acquired the rights and surviving elements of the Albatros productions, including Gribiche. In 1987, the film was reconstructed using the nitrate negative of the export version of the film; a master print was then made and the original titles reintroduced. A new edition was produced in 2008, using two additional original tinted nitrate prints.

== Alternative titles ==
- Mother of Mine (USA)
- Heimweh nach der Gasse (Germany)
- Die aus erster Ehe (Austria)
- Gribiche, el niño que no tuvo infancia (Spain)
- Barnet fra Gaden (Denmark)
