= Meerson =

Meerson is a Jewish surname. Notable people with the surname include:

- Andrey Meerson (1930–2020), Soviet and Russian architect
- Harry Meerson (1910/1911–1991), French photographer
- Lazare Meerson (1900–1938), French cinema art director
- Mary Meerson (1902–1993), French ballet dancer, model, and archivist
- Steve Meerson, American screenwriter and producer

== See also ==
- Meyerson
- Meerzon
