= People Who Travel =

People Who Travel may refer to:

- People Who Travel (1938 French-language film), a French-German film
- People Who Travel (1938 German-language film), a German drama film
