= Faces of Children =

1925 film

Faces of Children / Visages d'enfants
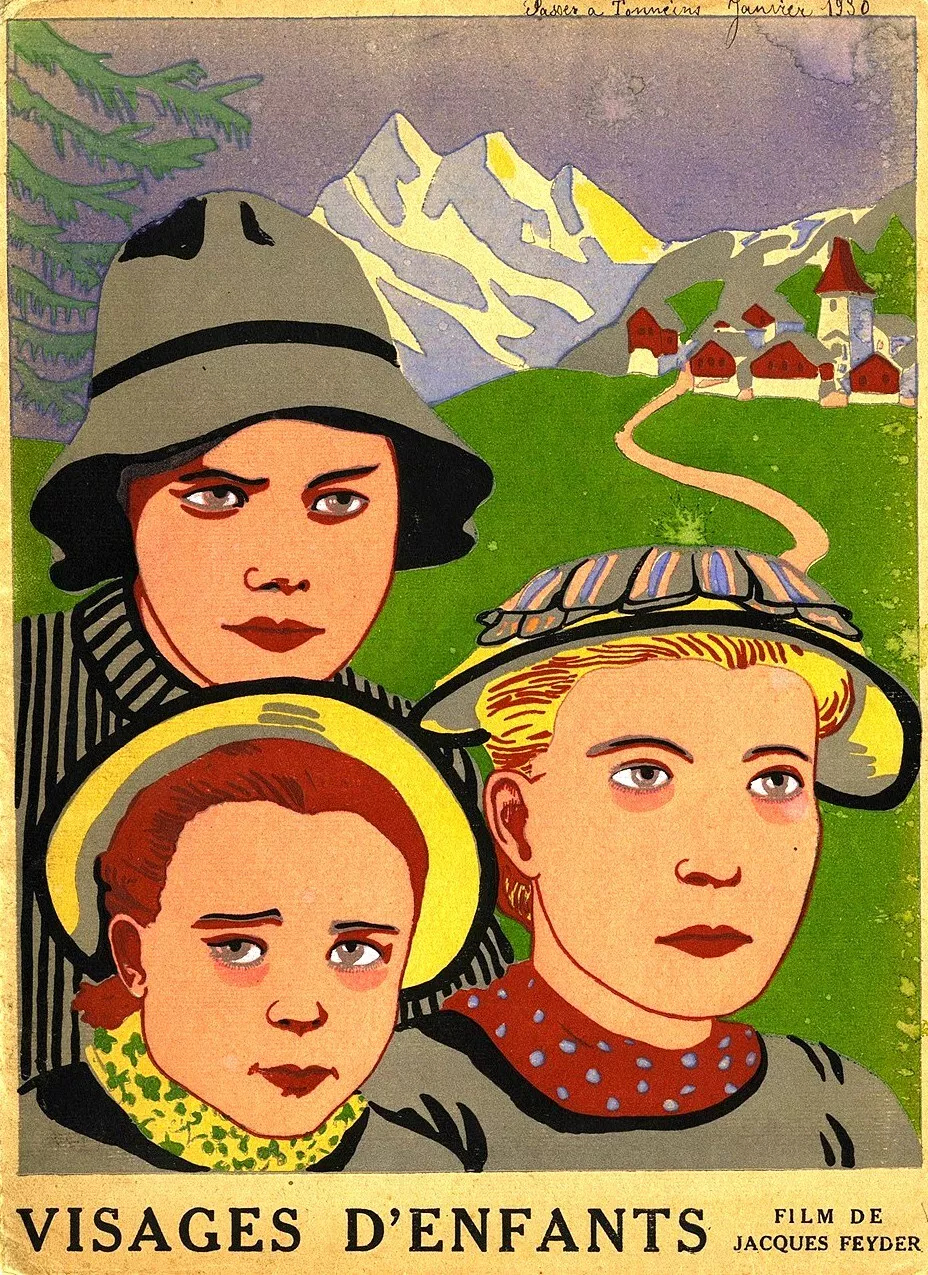
- Film poster
- Directed by: Jacques Feyder
- Written by: Jacques Feyder; Françoise Rosay; Dimitri De Zoubaloff
- Produced by: Dimitri De Zoubaloff; Arthur-Adrien Porchet
- Starring: Jean Forest
- Cinematography: Léonce-Henri Burel; Paul Parguel
- Edited by: Jacques Feyder
- Distributed by: Les Grands Films Indépendants; Jean de Merly / Étoile-Film
- Release date: 24 January 1925
- Running time: 117 minutes
- Countries: France; Switzerland
- Languages: Silent; French intertitles

Faces of Children (1925) by Jacques Feyder

Faces of Children (French: Visages d'enfants) is a 1925 French-Swiss silent film directed by Jacques Feyder. It tells the story of a young boy whose mother has died and the resentments which develop when his father remarries. It was a notable example of film realism in the silent era, and its psychological drama was integrated with the natural landscapes of Switzerland where much of the film was made on location.

== Plot ==
After the death of his wife, Pierre Amsler, the mayor ("président") of the village of Saint-Luc in the mountainous Haut-Valais region of Switzerland, is left to bring up his two children, Jean (c. 10 years old) and Pierrette (c. 5 years old). He sends his son away with his godfather, Canon Taillier, while he remarries with Jeanne Dutois, a widow with a daughter of her own (Arlette). When Canon Taillier breaks the news to Jean of his father's marriage, Jean is upset but promises to try to respect the decision.

When Jean returns home, he becomes resentful of his stepmother Jeanne whom he sees usurping his mother's place, and his feelings find their outlet in his growing hostility towards Arlette. Finding that his spacious bedroom is now occupied by Arlette and Pierrette and that he now has a smaller room, Jean takes the only portrait of his mother to his new room for comfort. While playing with Pierrette, he refuses to let Arlette join them, even though she and Pierrette got along well. When he sees Jeanne take a dress that his mother wore to make dresses for the two girls, he ruins it intentionally and is punished by Pierre for his behavior.

Jean and Arlette now despise each other. One day in winter while travelling in a sled, Jean surreptitiously throws Arlette's beloved childhood doll onto the track. That night, he tricks Arlette into venturing out onto the snow-covered mountain by telling her where her doll fell. Arlette gets lost and takes refuge in a chapel which becomes covered by an avalanche. Stricken with guilt, Jean tells Pierre what he has done, and a search party rescues Arlette from the chapel. Jean is silently reproached by his family for what he did to Arlette. When he turns to his mother's portrait for consolation, it appears faded and distant (implying his mother is disappointed in Jean for his behavior).

Next day Jean writes a letter of apology to his father, saying that he is going away, and he asks Arlette and Pierrette to deliver it. He goes to a nearby stream, where he has seen an image of his mother smiling at him, and prepares to drown himself. The girls tell Jeanne of his departure and she goes in search of him. She finds him just as he falls into the stream, and she wades into the fast-running water to rescue him. As Jeanne comforts him back in his room, Jean finally accepts her as his new mother.

== Cast ==
- Jean Forest as Jean Amsler, the son
- Victor Vina as Pierre Amsler, the father
- Pierrette Houyez as Pierrette Amsler, the daughter
- Rachel Devirys as Jeanne Dutois, the second wife
- Arlette Peyran as Arlette Dutois, the stepdaughter
- Jeanne Marie-Laurent as the neighbour
- Henri Duval as Canon Taillier, godfather of Jean
- Suzy Vernon as the mother of Jean and Pierrette

== Production ==
Jacques Feyder received a film commission from two Swiss producers, Dimitri de Zoubaleff and Arthur-Adrien Porchet, who were based in Lausanne, and he offered them Visages d'enfants. Feyder wrote his own original screenplay, assisted by his wife Françoise Rosay, taking a modern and unsentimental view of unhappy childhood and giving a psychologically realistic view of all the characters. He also embedded the story in a "social study of an isolated Catholic community's rituals and customs, in a landscape that alternately separates, endangers, and forces people closer together".

His ambitions for the film were greatly helped by the natural talent of the child actor Jean Forest in the central role; Feyder and Rosay had discovered him in the streets of Montmartre and he had featured in Feyder's previous film Crainquebille. During the spring and summer of 1923 (4 May - 2 August) filming of the many exterior scenes took place in the Haut-Valais and in the village of Grimentz, bringing landscapes prominently into view throughout the film. Feyder's cameraman, Léonce-Henri Burel, who had worked regularly with Abel Gance, achieved some striking visual effects, such as the night scenes of the search party lit by torches (instead of the more usual day for night technique); he also employed a subjective camera viewpoint to depict the onward rush of an avalanche. Local people were used as extras to play peasants and villagers, notably in the funeral and wedding scenes; (many of them had never seen a film or a camera before). Interior scenes were shot at the Studios des Réservoirs at Joinville in Paris (10 August – 6 October). (During shooting at Joinville, Feyder went to Vienna to negotiate his next contract: his wife Françoise Rosay stood in for him as director while he was away.)

After shooting was completed, Feyder had a disagreement with the distribution company Les Grands Films Indépendants, which impounded the film stock from January to May 1924. Feyder had to wait for a nearly a year before he was able to complete the editing. The release of the film did not take place until 1925, two years after work on it had begun.

== Reception ==
The film opened in March 1925 at the Montparnasse cinema in Paris. It was immediately acclaimed as a landmark by critics. It was not however popular with the public and it became a commercial failure. Its critical prestige brought it some distribution abroad, and in Japan in 1926 the press named it as the best European film of the year.

Later assessments have continued to value it for its simple intimacy and emotional poignancy, and for "the unusual authenticity of its natural and social milieu". The opening sequence in particular, depicting a village funeral, and lasting for about 11 minutes, has been admired for the skill of its exposition which combines narrative clarity with social detail and psychological insight. Georges Sadoul regarded Visages d'enfants as one of Feyder's best films; and Jean Mitry in 1973 declared that, apart from the triptych in Gance's Napoléon and Clair's Un chapeau de paille d'Italie, of all the French productions of the 1920s, Visages d'enfants was the one he would choose to save: it was the most consistent, even and balanced, the only one which was still today resolutely modern.

== Restoration ==
After the film's commercial failure, the negative disappeared, and until the 1980s it was largely known through incomplete and poor quality copies. In 1986 the Cinémathèque royale de Belgique made a first restoration of the film using material held in Brussels, Amsterdam and Lausanne, together with some material already restored by the Cinémathèque française. This version lacked intertitles and colour tinting. In 1993 the Belgian and French cinematheques were assisted by Gosfilmofond (Moscow) and Nederlands Filmmuseum (Amsterdam) in a new restoration which added colour tinting. In 2004 Lobster Films (Paris) completed the restoration using digital technology to reduce spots and marks in the images, and the original French intertitles were restored. A new score (for octet) was commissioned from Antonio Coppola.
