= Gribiche =

Gribiche may refer to:

- Sauce gribiche, cold condiment of egg and mustard
- Gribiche (film), 1926 silent feature directed by Jacques Feyder
- "Gribiche", 1937 short story by Colette
