= Maiwald =

Maiwald or Maywald is a German language habitational surname. Notable people with the name include:

- Anna Maiwald (1990), German athlete
- Armin Maiwald (1940), German author, television director and producer
- Karlene Maywald (1961), Australian National Party politician
- Roland Maywald (1948), former German badminton player
- Willy Maywald (1907–1985), German photographer
