= Pension Mimosas =

1935 film

- Theatrical release poster
- Directed by: Jacques Feyder
- Written by: Charles Spaak; Jacques Feyder
- Produced by: Société des Films Sonores Tobis; Charles-Félix Tavano
- Starring: Françoise Rosay; Paul Bernard
- Cinematography: Roger Hubert
- Edited by: Jacques Brillouin
- Music by: Armand Bernard
- Distributed by: Films Sonores Tobis
- Release date: 18 January 1935
- Running time: 109 minutes
- Country: France
- Language: French

Pension Mimosas is a 1935 French drama film directed by Jacques Feyder. Based on an original scenario by Feyder and Charles Spaak, it is a psychological drama set largely in a small hotel on the Côte d'Azur, and it provided Françoise Rosay with one of the most substantial acting roles of her career. It was produced by the French subsidiary of the German company Tobis Film.

== Plot ==
1924. Louise Noblet keeps a small hotel, the Pension Mimosas, on the Côte d'Azur in the south of France, with her husband Gaston who is also a supervisor in local casino. Many of their clientele are luckless gamblers hoping for success in the local casino. Childless themselves, Louise and Gaston have been bringing up the young Pierre while his father serves a prison sentence, but they are dismayed when the father is released early and comes to take back his son.

1934. Pierre, now a young man, is living in Paris among gamblers and gangsters, and he still plays upon the feelings of his former adoptive parents to extract money from them. Louise makes him return to the Pension Mimosas and find a job, but she now develops an ambiguous affection for him. To please him, she even invites his mistress Nelly to join him in the hotel. The two women soon become rivals, while Pierre accumulates debts. Louise reveals Nelly's whereabouts to her old protector who comes to take her back. In despair Pierre kills himself, while Louise has gone to the casino under an assumed identity to win the money to pay his debts.

== Cast ==
- Françoise Rosay as Louise Noblet
- Paul Bernard as Pierre
- André Alerme as Gaston Noblet
- Lise Delamare as Nelly
- Arletty as Parasol
- Jean-Max as Romani

== Background ==
Pension Mimosas was the second of three films which Jacques Feyder made in swift succession on his return to France after his unsatisfactory experience in Hollywood. All three films were developed in conjunction with the scenarist Charles Spaak and included major roles for Feyder's wife Françoise Rosay, but each told a different kind of story and employed a distinctly different style of filming. Whereas Le Grand Jeu (1934) was a fast-moving melodrama with some exotic settings, and the later La Kermesse héroïque would be a satirical period farce, Pension Mimosas presented a more measured contemporary drama.

== Production ==
Filming took place from August to October 1934. The setting of the Pension Mimosas is not specifically identified in the film, but a few exterior shots show the casino at Menton as well as its gardens and swimming pool. Apart from a few other exterior shots on the Côte d'Azur and some in Paris, most of the film was shot in the studio (at the Tobis studios in Épinay). Lazare Meerson created a detailed but unobtrusive set which presented the various areas of the hotel as an integrated whole, facilitating the revelations and interactions of the drama. This enclosed setting (though spacious and brightly lit) gives much of the film the feeling of a stage play, a factor which has sometimes been held against it, but it also concentrates attention upon the interplay of character and the actors' performances.

Although gambling is continually featured in the background and the activities of the characters, frustrated love is the more central theme of the film.

Françoise Rosay dominates the action in a role which recalls aspects of Racine's Phèdre in its exploration of a mother's feelings which are also those of a lover.

Arletty appears in a small role (one scene only) as a parachutist living on the fringes of bad company in Paris.

Marcel Carné worked as assistant director on the film.

== Reception ==
The film was released in Paris in January 1935 with an exclusive run at the Cinéma Colisée. A contemporary reviewer judged that Pension Mimosas showed the real Jacques Feyder, working by and for himself, creating a powerful and moving story that was also full of delicacy and humour; the characters, which were real and directly presented, owed much to the exceptional quality of the dialogue (by Charles Spaak) and the choice of actors who were able to perform to each other rather than to the camera.

The film's sobriety of style and lack of sensational elements impressed other critics. A contemporary film historian said, "One rediscovers [in Feyder]... a simplicity which benefits the often profound revelation of the psychological drama through the performance of the actors...". This view has been echoed by a more recent critic: "Without the more ostentatious virtues of Le Grand Jeu and La Kermesse héroïque, Pension Mimosas is a film in intaglio in which Feyder finds a style of classical refinement, free from any pathos... This masterpiece of psychological analysis leaves nothing to chance, either in the precision of the screenplay or in the detail of the set-design or in the controlled performances of the actors."

When the film was shown in the United States in 1936, it was significantly cut, and the result did not find favour with the reviewer of the New York Times: "...it fails to justify the accolades given it by the foreign press. ...As it emerges now it either has not been edited as severely as it merits, or has been cut too harshly. Its pace is somnolent; certain episodes are extraneous and immaterial, and it suggests it might have had a tragic meaning other than the one it now conveys." In later decades, Pension Mimosas has not enjoyed wide circulation in the English-speaking world.

What was agreed even by disappointed critics was the remarkable quality of the performance by Françoise Rosay. "Although everything may not be perfect in this film, one can say that the cinema has rarely shown us a human and living character as complex as that portrayed by Françoise Rosay, with such marvellous intelligence and art." Among the many performances that Rosay gave in films directed by her husband, none was more searching or powerful than this one, and Feyder himself, in a dedication that he wrote on a copy of the screenplay, paid tribute to the "overwhelming emotion" that she brought to the role.

The film's realism was influential upon the developing styles of poetic realism in French cinema (especially upon Marcel Carné who acknowledged "the invisible presence" of Feyder which was always at his side when he went on to direct his own films).
