= Harry Stradling =

American cinematographer

Harry Stradling, A.S.C.
- Born: September 1, 1901; Newark, New Jersey, U.S.
- Died: February 14, 1970 (aged 68); Los Angeles, California, U.S.
- Occupation: cinematographer
- Years active: 1920–1970
- Children: Harry Stradling Jr.

Henry A. Stradling, A.S.C. (September 1, 1901 – February 14, 1970) was an American cinematographer with more than 130 films to his credit.

His uncle Walter Stradling, son Harry Stradling Jr. and godson Gerald Perry Finnerman were also cinematographers.

== Early career ==
Stradling was born in Newark, New Jersey (some sources suggest Neesen[?], Germany, or England), the nephew of cameraman Walter Stradling (died 1918) who had worked with Mary Pickford. Confined to two-reelers in Hollywood, he left for France and Germany in the early 1930s. He made contributions to several Jacques Feyder films, Le Grand Jeu (1934), La Kermesse héroïque (Carnival in Flanders) (1935), Die Klugen Frauen (1936) and Knight Without Armour (1937), his first under producer Alexander Korda in England. Other English films include Action for Slander (1937), The Divorce of Lady X (1938), South Riding, The Citadel (1938), Pygmalion (1938), The Lion Has Wings, Jamaica Inn (1939), Q Planes (1939).

== Hollywood ==
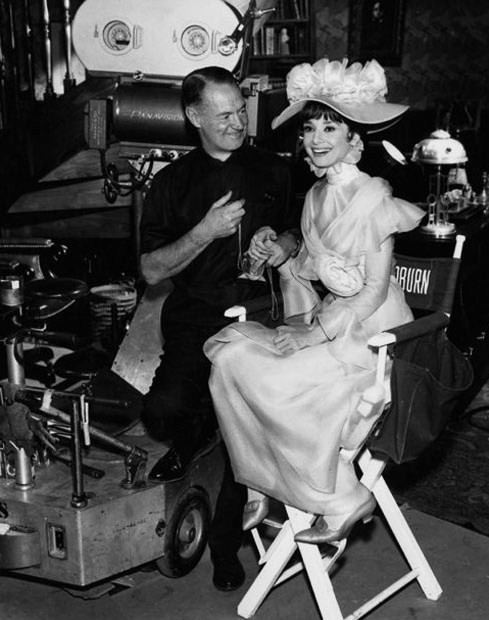
Harry Stradling and Audrey Hepburn on the set of My Fair Lady

Stradling moved to the United States at the beginning of World War II. Alfred Hitchcock engaged him for Mr. & Mrs. Smith (1941) and Suspicion (1941). Stradling's last four films starred Barbra Streisand, including her Oscar-winning debut Funny Girl.

During his career, he photographed Marlene Dietrich, Vivien Leigh, Katharine Hepburn, Carole Lombard, Audrey Hepburn, Jean Simmons, Esther Williams, Lucille Ball, Hedy Lamarr, Rosalind Russell, Kim Novak, Judy Garland, and Barbra Streisand.

Stradling died halfway through production of The Owl and the Pussycat in Hollywood, California.

== Selected filmography ==
Year	Film	Notes
1922	How Women Love	
1922	His Wife's Husband	
1925	Share and Share Alike	
1927	Burnt Fingers	
1929	Lucky in Love	
1932	Passionately	
1933	Suburban Melody	
1934	Le Grand Jeu	
1934	The Lady of the Camellias	
1935	La Kermesse héroïque	
1935	Happy Arenas	
1936	The Great Refrain	
1936	Silhouettes	
1937	South Riding	
1937	Action for Slander	
1937	Dark Journey	
1937	Knight Without Armour	
1938	The Divorce of Lady X	
1938	Pygmalion	
1938	The Citadel	
1939	Jamaica Inn	
1940	My Son, My Son!	
1940	They Knew What They Wanted	
1941	Mr. & Mrs. Smith	
1941	Suspicion	
1941	The Devil and Miss Jones	
1942	Her Cardboard Lover	
1943	The Human Comedy	nominated for Academy Award
1945	The Picture of Dorian Gray	Academy Award
1946	Easy to Wed	
1948	Easter Parade	
1948	Words and Music	
1948	The Pirate	
1949	The Barkleys of Broadway	nominated for Academy Award
1949	In the Good Old Summertime	
1950	Edge of Doom	
1951	I Want You	
1951	A Streetcar Named Desire	nominated for Academy Award
1952	Angel Face	
1952	Androcles and the Lion	
1952	Hans Christian Andersen	nominated for Academy Award
1953	A Lion Is in the Streets	
1954	Johnny Guitar	
1955	Guys and Dolls	nominated for Academy Award
1956	The Eddy Duchin Story	nominated for Academy Award
1957	The Pajama Game	
1957	A Face in the Crowd	
1958	Auntie Mame	nominated for Academy Award
1958	Marjorie Morningstar	
1959	A Summer Place	
1959	The Young Philadelphians	nominated for Academy Award
1960	The Dark at the Top of the Stairs	
1961	A Majority of One	nominated for Academy Award
1962	Gypsy	nominated for Academy Award
1964	My Fair Lady	Academy Award
1965	How to Murder Your Wife	
1966	Walk Don't Run	
1968	Funny Girl	nominated for Academy Award
1969	Hello, Dolly!	nominated for Academy Award
1970	On a Clear Day You Can See Forever	
1970	The Owl and the Pussycat	
