= The Smugglers' Banquet =

1952 film

- Directed by: Henri Storck
- Written by: Charles Spaak
- Produced by: Fritz Aeckerle; Georges Friedland; Frantz Van Dorpe
- Starring: Françoise Rosay; Raymond Pellegrin; Paul Frankeur
- Cinematography: Eugen Schüfftan
- Edited by: Georges Friedland; Hilde E. Grabow; Georges Lust
- Release date: 9 July 1952
- Running time: 90 minutes
- Countries: Belgium; West Germany
- Language: French

The Smugglers' Banquet (French: Le Banquet des fraudeurs, German: Das Bankett der Schmuggler) is a 1952 Belgian-West German crime film directed by Henri Storck. It was entered into the 1952 Cannes Film Festival.

== Cast ==
In alphabetical order

- Marguerite Daulboys
- Yves Deniaud – Van Mol
- Arthur Devère – Fabriekskoncierge
- Marthe Dua
- Fred Engelen – Douane-lieutenant
- Ludzer Eringa – Nederlandse Burgemeester
- Paul Frankeur – Auguste Demeuse
- Kurt Großkurth – Dikke Charles
- Käthe Haack – Moeder van Elsa
- Gert Günther Hoffmann
- Daniel Ivernel – Jef
- Karl John – Hans
- Jean-Pierre Kérien – Pierre
- Christiane Lénier – Siska van Moll
- Robert Lussac – Smokkelaar
- Charles Mahieu – Lieutenant van de rijkswacht
- Mia Mendelson
- Maryse Paillet – Kobi
- Raymond Pellegrin – Michel Demeuse
- Sylvain Poons – Vrachtwagenbestuurder
- Françoise Rosay – Gabrielle Demeuse
- Eva Ingeborg Scholz – Elsa Menzler
- André Valmy – Le douanier Louis
- Edgar Willy – Arbeider
