= Myerson =

Myerson is a surname. Notable people with the surname include:

- Abraham Myerson (1881–1948), American neurologist, psychiatrist, clinician, pathologist, and researcher
- Adam Myerson (born 1972), American bicycle racer
- Alan Myerson (born 1940), American film and television director
- Albert L. Myerson, American chemist
- Bess Myerson (1924–2014), Miss America and TV personality
- Eleanor Myerson, American politician
- Jeremy Myerson, British journalist, academic and author
- Joel Myerson (1945–2021), American academic
- Jonathan Myerson (born 1960), British dramatist, writing principally for television and radio, spouse of Julie
- Julie Myerson (born 1960), English author and critic, spouse of Jonathan
- Michael Myerson, American writer and activist
- Roger Myerson (born 1951), American economist
- Ted Myerson, American entrepreneur and business executive
- Terry Myerson (born 1972), software engineer

== See also ==
- Meyerson
- Myerson's sign, an early symptom of Parkinson's disease
- Myerson–Satterthwaite theorem, in mechanism design and the economics of asymmetric information
