= The Barton Mystery (1949 film) =

- Directed by: Charles Spaak
- Written by: Walter Hackett (play); Charles Spaak
- Produced by: Alexandre Kamenka
- Starring: Françoise Rosay; Fernand Ledoux; Madeleine Robinson
- Cinematography: Léonce-Henri Burel
- Edited by: Léonide Azar
- Music by: Daniel Lesur
- Production companies: Alkam; Radio Cinéma
- Release date: 19 August 1949
- Running time: 88 minutes
- Country: France
- Language: French

The Barton Mystery (French: Le mystère Barton) is a 1949 French mystery film directed by Charles Spaak and starring Françoise Rosay, Fernand Ledoux and Madeleine Robinson. It is based on the 1916 British play The Barton Mystery by Walter Hackett. It was the screenwriter Spaak's only attempt at directing a film.

== Cast ==
- Françoise Rosay as Élisabeth
- Fernand Ledoux as Beverley
- Madeleine Robinson as Lucy
- Georges Lannes as Patrick
- Nathalie Nattier as Evelyn
- Loleh Bellon as Cathy
- Jacques Torrens as Franck
- Maurice Teynac as Barton
- Jean Marchat as Olivier
- Régine Dancourt
- Jacques Mattler as Le juge
- Robert Moor as Le domestique
- Geneviève Morel as La bonne de Beverley
- Victor Vina as Le mari trompé

== Bibliography ==
- David Quinlan. The Illustrated Guide to Film Directors. Batsford, 1983.
