= Victor Vina =

French actor

- Born: 29 August 1885; Saint-Maur-des-Fossés, France
- Died: 28 May 1961 (aged 75); Paris, France
- Other name: Victor Vinatieri
- Occupation: Actor
- Years active: 1920–1955 (film)

Victor Vina (1885–1961) was a French film actor.

He was born Victor Emanuel Jules Vinatieri in Saint-Maur-des-Fossés, France and died in Paris.

== Selected filmography ==
- The Portrait (1923)
- Faces of Children (1925)
- Carmen (1926)
- Madame Récamier (1928)
- Island of Love (1929)
- 77 Rue Chalgrin (1931)
- Imperial Violets (1932)
- The Woman Dressed As a Man (1932)
- The Tunnel (1933)
- Casanova (1934)
- Golgotha (1935)
- Stradivarius (1935)
- The Call of Silence (1936)
- Michel Strogoff (1936)
- Compliments of Mister Flow (1936)
- The Red Dancer (1937)
- Men of Prey (1937)
- Chéri-Bibi (1938)
- The Patriot (1938)
- Barnabé (1938)
- Hopes (1941)
- The Great Maguet (1947)
- The Bouquinquant Brothers (1947)
- The Secret of Monte Cristo (1948)
- Three Investigations (1948)
- The Barton Mystery (1949)

== Bibliography ==
- Goble, Alan. The Complete Index to Literary Sources in Film. Walter de Gruyter, 1999.
