= Willy Maywald =

German photographer (1907–1985)

Wilhelm "Willy" Maywald (15 August 1907 – 21 May 1985) was a German photographer who was best known for his portrait and fashion photography.

== Early life and education ==
Maywald was born on August 15, 1907, in Kleve, German Empire (present day Germany) to a family of hoteliers. He grew up becoming interested in the aesthetics of art. Maywald studied at the Technical Schools of Art in Krefeld, Cologne and Berlin. His wide range of education was what let him be the avant-garde artist that he was.

== Career ==
After school, Maywald returned to this hometown in 1931 but soon realized that the city was too small for the career he wanted for himself. He then moved to Paris where he began his career of photo reporting and befriending other modern artists. He chose to live a bohemian lifestyle and photographed various subjects such as artists, dancers, fashion, etc. Maywald photographed the qualities of living in France with his camera. He became an assistant to Harry Meerson who was a Polish photographer and started to learn from Meerson how to make a living from photography.

Maywald moved to Switzerland in 1942 and was held captive in camps for foreigners. In the year of 1943 he was allowed to start working again in portrait photography as a self-employed artist. Maywald was very well known for his black and white photography and stunning lighting.

When he moved back to Paris in August 1946 he mainly focused on fashion and celebrity photography. He photographed for various fashion designers and his images were recognized internationally. Maywald was known for photographing in unique scenes. He was one of the first fashion photographers to photograph his subjects in the streets of Paris. He had a way of photographing his subjects in these various places but the image still focused on the model/clothing. He became Christian Dior’s elite photographer. Maywald photographed the well-known designers creations and his photographs were featured on the cover of several magazines including Vogue and Vanity Fair. Although Maywald was the main photographer for Dior, he also photographed for several other fashion designers at the time. Although photographing fashion, he produced images of celebrities as well.

These celebrities ranged from artists to movie stars to athletes: Tamara de Lempicka, Hans Arp, Georges Braque, Marc Chagall, Pablo Picasso, Le Corbusier, Fernand Léger, Joan Miró, Georges Rouault and Maurice Utrillo.

Maywald retired in 1968, and died in 1985 in Paris.

== Publications ==
Maywald, Willy. Die Splitter Des Spiegels: Eine Illustrierte Autobiographie. German ed. Schirmer/Mosel, 1985. 292. Print

== Selected exhibitions ==
- Willy Maywald, Photographer and cosmopolitan. Portrait, fashion, and reportage, Berlin, 2015
- Willy Maywald, Hommage aux Chapeaux 1936–1968 at the Atelier-Musee du Chapeau, 2013
- Willy Maywald, Portrait of Le Corbusier, 1948 at the Luhring Augustine Gallery, New York City, 2006
