= Back Streets of Paris =

1946 film

- Original release poster
- Directed by: Jacques Feyder; Marcel Blistène (finished)
- Written by: Jacques Viot (scenario, adapatation. dialogue)
- Produced by: Eugène Tucherer
- Starring: Françoise Rosay; Paul Meurisse; Andrée Clément; Simone Signoret
- Cinematography: Louis Page
- Edited by: Isabelle Elman
- Music by: Jean Wiener
- Production company: B.U.P. Française
- Distributed by: Régina
- Release date: 27 November 1946 (France)
- Running time: 105 minutes
- Country: France
- Language: French

Back Streets of Paris (French: Macadam) is a 1946 French crime film directed by Marcel Blistène. Jacques Feyder also contributed to the film in the role of artistic director.

== Plot ==
This story involves Madame Rose, a hotelkeeper in a Paris suburb who will stop at nothing, including murder. Other characters include one of her former accomplices who carries a suitcase full of cash, a kindhearted street vendor, the gangster's mistress, and the landlady's daughter, Simone, who dreams of a better life.

== Cast ==
- Françoise Rosay as Mme. Rose
- Paul Meurisse as Victor Menard
- Andrée Clément as Simone
- Simone Signoret as Gisele
- André Roanne as Marvejouis
- Paul Demange as Marcel, le coiffeur
- Georges Bever as Armand (as Bever)
- Jeannette Batti as Mona
- François Joux as Un inspecteur
- Félix Clément as Himself
- Richard Francoeur as Le maître d'hotel
- Jacqueline Fontaine as Himself
- Simone Max as Himself
- André Nicard as Le voleur de draps
- Félix Oudart as L'Hertier
- Jacques Dacqmine as Fraçois (as Jacques Dacqmine de la Comédie Française)

== Production ==
Filming took place between June and August 1946 at the Studios de Saint-Maurice, with exterior scenes filmed at the Zoo de Vincennes. Jean d'Eaubonne was the set designer.

Jacques Feyder is credited as artistic director ("direction artistique"). Although Feyder was ill at the time, according to Françoise Rosay (his wife) he was asked to supervise filming because various members of the crew had no confidence in the young and inexperienced director, Marcel Blistène. Relations on the set between Blistène and Feyder were hostile, and once filming was finished it was Feyder who oversaw the editing.
