= Meerzon =

Meerzon (Russian: Меерзон) is a Russian transliteration of the Jewish surname Meyerson. Notable people with the surname include:

- Joseph Meerzon
- Iosif Meerzon (1900–1941), Soviet architect and artist

== See also ==
- Meerson
