= Beautiful Days (1935 film) =

1935 film

- Directed by: Marc Allégret
- Written by: Charles Spaak; Jacques Viot
- Produced by: Simon Schiffrin
- Starring: Simone Simon; Jean-Pierre Aumont; Raymond Rouleau
- Cinematography: Michel Kelber
- Edited by: Denise Tual
- Music by: Georges Van Parys
- Production company: Flag Films
- Distributed by: Cinéma de France
- Release date: 8 November 1935
- Running time: 80 minutes
- Country: France
- Language: French

Beautiful Days (French: Les Beaux jours) is a 1935 French comedy film directed by Marc Allégret and starring Simone Simon, Jean-Pierre Aumont and Raymond Rouleau. The film's sets were designed by the art directors Jean d'Eaubonne and Lazare Meerson.

== Synopsis ==
After the death of her father leaves her alone in Paris without any money, Sylvie meets two men Pierre and Boris who she struggles to choose between romantically.

== Cast ==
- Simone Simon as Sylvie - une jeune fille aimée par deux garçons
- Jean-Pierre Aumont as Pierre - le premier amoureux de Sylvie
- Raymond Rouleau as Boris - le deuxième amoureux de Sylvie
- Roland Toutain as Charles
- Fernand Charpin as Le patron de l'hôtel
- Maurice Baquet as Toto
- Jean-Louis Barrault as René
- Pierre Larquey as Le père de Pierre
- Jacques Berlioz as Le professeur Destouches
- Catherine Fonteney as La directrice
- Lucienne Le Marchand as Tania
- Jacqueline Mignac as Angélique
- Pierre-Louis as Julien
- Jean Sinoël as Le jardinier
- Thao-Ba as Bâ
- Henri Vilbert as Le paysan

== Critical reception ==
Variety wrote that the film had "great photography" but was "extremely slow moving." Of Simone Simon, they commented that the film reveals "a girl of great personality and charm without much emotional acting skill", but the comments about Jean-Louis Barrault were more complimentary and said that he displayed "a strong personality and great acting fire." They wrote that the film may appeal to American audiences "because of the portrayal of modern Paris student life and also because of the youth and freshness of the actors."

== Bibliography ==
- Bessy, Maurice & Chirat, Raymond. Histoire du cinéma français: 1935-1939. Pygmalion, 1986.
- Crisp, Colin. French Cinema—A Critical Filmography: Volume 1, 1929-1939. Indiana University Press, 2015.
- Rège, Philippe. Encyclopedia of French Film Directors, Volume 1. Scarecrow Press, 2009.
