= Carnival in Flanders (film) =

1935 film directed by Jacques Feyder

- Poster
- Directed by: Jacques Feyder
- Written by: Jacques Feyder; Charles Spaak (story); Robert A. Stemmle; Bernard Zimmer (dialogue)
- Produced by: Pierre Guerlais
- Starring: Françoise Rosay; Jean Murat; André Alerme
- Cinematography: Harry Stradling Sr.
- Edited by: Jacques Brillouin
- Music by: Louis Beydts
- Distributed by: Films Sonores Tobis
- Release dates: 3 December 1935 (France); 15 January 1936 (Germany)
- Running time: 110 minutes
- Country: France
- Language: French

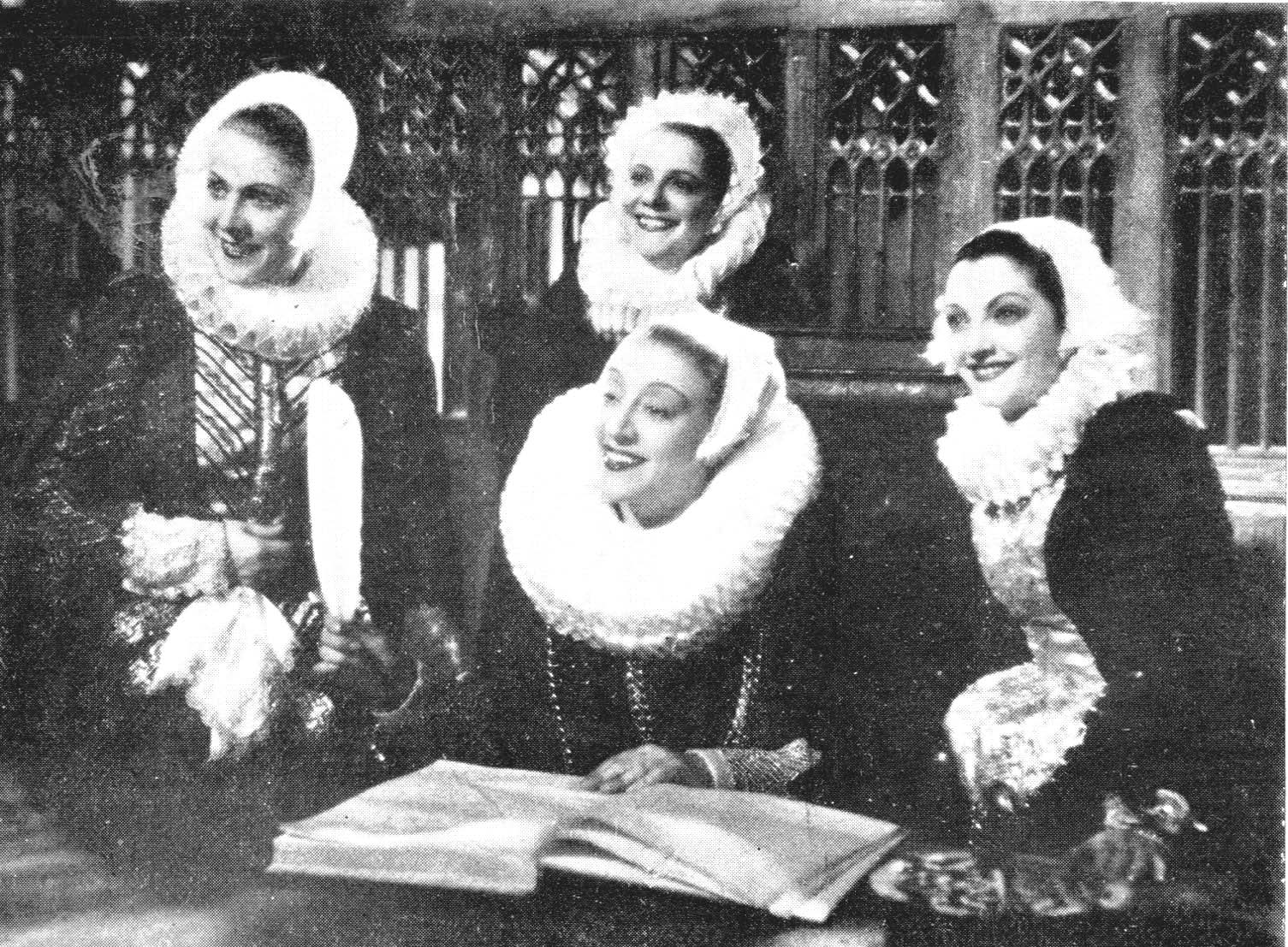
Women running the town after receiving the Spanish envoy

Carnival in Flanders is a 1935 French historical romantic comedy film directed by Jacques Feyder, and created during the poetic realism period in 1930s France. It is also widely known under its original title in French, La Kermesse héroïque. A German-language version of the film was made simultaneously and was released under the title Die klugen Frauen, featuring Ernst Schiffner in one of his early film roles.

== Plot ==
In 1616, when Flanders is part of the Hispanic Monarchy, the town of Boom, in the midst of preparations for its carnival, learns that a Spanish duke with his army is on the way to spend the night there.

Fearing that this will inevitably result in rape and pillage, the mayor — supported by his town council — has the idea of pretending to be newly dead, in order to avoid receiving the soldiers. But his redoubtable wife Cornelia despises this stratagem and organises the other women to prepare hospitality and to adapt their carnival entertainments for the Spaniards (who insist on entering the town anyway). The men of the town grow increasingly paranoid of Spaniards as the women are free to run the stores and inns. The women from the outset take on a new set of sexual liberation in juxtaposition to the rape and pillaging stewed up from the men at the beginning of the film.

Such is the warmth of the women's welcome that not only do the Spaniards refrain from misbehaviour, but on their departure the Duke announces a year's remission of taxes for the town.

Cornelia allows her husband to take the credit for their good fortune, but she has in the meantime thwarted his plans for their daughter to marry the town butcher instead of the young painter Brueghel whom she loves.

== Cast ==
- Françoise Rosay as Cornelia de Witte, Madame la Bourgmestre/Madame Burgomaster
- André Alerme as Korbus de Witte, le bourgmestre/The Burgomaster (as Alerme)
- Jean Murat as Le duc d'Olivarès/The Duke
- Louis Jouvet as Le chapelain/The Priest
- Lyne Clevers as La poissonnière/The Fish-Wife (as Lynne Clevers)
- Micheline Cheirel as Siska
- Maryse Wendling as La boulangère/The Baker's Wife
- Ginette Gaubert as L'aubergiste/The Inn-Keeper's Wife
- Marguerite Ducouret as La femme du brasseur/The Brewer's Wife
- Bernard Lancret as Jean Breughel, a young painter
- Alfred Adam as Josef Van Meulen, le boucher
- Pierre Labry as L'aubergiste/The Inn-Keeper
- Arthur Devère as Le poissonnier/The Fishmonger (as Arthur Devere)
- Marcel Carpentier as Le boulanger/The Baker
- Alexander D'Arcy as Le capitaine/The Captain (as Alexandre Darcy)
- Claude Sainval as Le lieutenant/The Lieutenant (as Claude Saint Val)
- Delphin as Le nain/The Dwarf

== Background and production ==
Carnival in Flanders / La Kermesse héroïque was made by Jacques Feyder immediately after his dark psychological drama Pension Mimosas, and he said that he wanted to relax by making a farce, far removed from the present day. He turned to a short story written at his suggestion ten years earlier by Charles Spaak, set in 17th century Flanders when it was under Spanish occupation. For the visual style of the film, Feyder wanted to pay tribute to the old masters of his native country — Brueghel, Frans Hals, Pieter de Hoogh — and an elaborate creation of a Flemish town was undertaken (in suburban Paris) by the designer Lazare Meerson. Sumptuous costumes were provided by Georges K. Benda. The strong cast included Feyder's wife Françoise Rosay and Louis Jouvet.

The film was produced by the French subsidiary of the German firm Tobis, and it was made in two versions, French and German, with alternative casts (apart from Françoise Rosay who appeared in both).

== Costume design and designer ==
Georges K. Benda was the main designer for this film, and he went on to work on many French films from the 1930s to the 1950s. Benda was renowned for his attention to historical accuracy and capacity to design visually arresting costumes. However, he had a difficult time designing costumes for "La Kermesse héroque", as it was difficult to accurately represent both the Spanish and Flemish cultures in the film. For the costumes, Benda would have to incorporate historical accuracy as well as including comedic feelings as well. While the uniforms of soldiers are dreary and serious, the uniforms of civilians are brighter and more extravagant. However, the women's costumes are even more elaborate with pronounced features such as voluminous skirts and tight bodices; and many of the costumes feature luxurious trimmings such as ruffles and lace. The Burgomaster's wife wears one of the movie's most memorable outfits. Her outfit is oversized, eye-catching, and perfectly captures the character's personality. The large headdress, which is embellished with ribbons and feathers, would be most recognizable aspect of the outfit. With this headdress, the Burgomaster's wife's already impressive height would be emphasized which made her stand out in a crowd even more. Benda went on to design costumes for other French films, including "Le Million", "Knight Without Armor", and "Koenigsmark".

In "Pour Vous" magazine issue N. 361, published in 1935, Benda was interviewed and provided insight into his work on the film. The magazine also showed what are believed to be sketches of the design for the costumes that were created by Benda himself. In the article, according to Benda, he states that “fortunately, Feyder had told me about the Kermesse, long before starting his film. That allowed me to gather a number of documents in advance, and so I was able, in six weeks, not only make my four hundred models, but choose the fabrics to perform them.”

== Production design ==
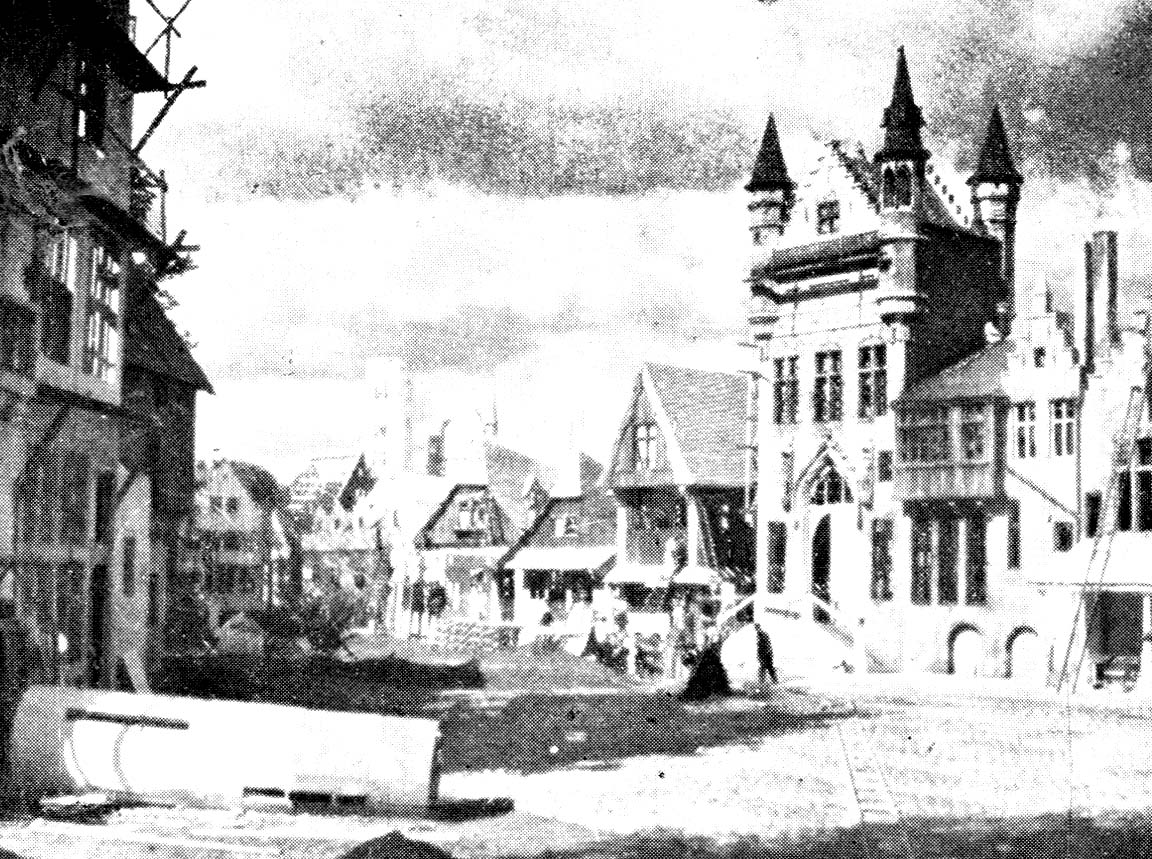
The Town of Boom on the Epinay Studio lot

Production designer Lazare Meerson was put in charge of creating the setting for the film. He had to bring Feyder's vision to life, a challenging task for a story set several hundred years prior to the time of production. Meerson took care in building the set from scratch, and, as The National Board of Review Magazine notes, he was able to elegantly contrive an atmosphere true to 17th century Flanders. Meerson's set construction and arrangement of set decoration has been widely known for its nods to early Flemish paintings, which is reflected by Siska's love interest, Julien's remarkable artistic talents, as well as the blocking, which carefully mimicked the positioning of these classical works of art. Cornelia is shown sitting at the center of a table in an arrangement reminiscent of Leonardo da Vinci's The Last Supper, subtly suggesting that she is the real 'savior' of the town. Furthermore, as noted by Dudley Andrew, Meerson took on many painterly influences to completely recreate the Flemish city beginning with raw materials, reduced to 3/4 scale, further caricaturizing the men of the town. Reported by the Motion Picture Review Digest, the New York Herald Tribune praised Meerson for his talent in emulating the style of still Flemish paintings in many scenes.

The scale and detail of the set was achieved by Feyder and Meerson’s insistence to their German financial backers, which led them to dig a canal through the center of the Epinay Studios. The Flemish town was created around the canal in the architectural styles of the age depicted, providing the stylized depth which was Meerson’s trademark.

== Cinematography ==
The cinematographer for this film was frequent Jacques Feyder collaborator Harry Stradling Sr., a well-known cinematographer for films such as A Streetcar Named Desire, Funny Girl, and Alfred Hitchcock’s Mr. & Mrs. Smith. He came over to France due to the restrictions to two-reelers, or films with a runtime of 20 minutes, in Hollywood. In France he would work on a number of Jacques Feyder’s films.

Much of the themes of the film are shown through the subtle camerawork Stradling bought to the picture. These range from lines in the set or poles separating the Duke and his wife, showing the audience the distance between the characters. In the imaginary pillaging of the town a wide shot is used to allow the viewer to take in all the destruction but also distance from the violence to keep the sarcastic nature of the sequence intact. The sequence also includes many camera movements such as pans, tilts or tracking shots to hide some of the more extreme acts that are suggested as women are being dragged away. The use of wide shots also aids in reinforcing the idea of a Flemish painting. Shots such as windmills on green pastures or all the activity happening in the town for preparation for the carnival.

Meerson envisioned a middle ground of set design between core to poetic-realism between “realism and stylization” meant to highlight the themes of the film. Totalization, the ability to show the full scope of a setting and the micro-details contained within comes from Meerson’s detailed set design. In conjunction to Stradling’s use of shots emphasizing the scale, Meerson’s set combines the architecture of the time such as the church spires to provide a large feeling of the town of Boom.

== Themes ==
Carnival in Flanders satirizes acts of cowardice using the women of the town to foil the men as they hide themselves against what they believe to an invading Spanish army. Other themes include the power dynamics of men and women, passivism does not necessarily mean one has to be a coward, and sexual liberation.

== Reception ==
On the strength of its richly detailed tableaux and the confident manner in which Feyder animated his historical farce, the film enjoyed considerable success in France and elsewhere in the world. The film historian Raymond Chirat pointed to the combination of the admirable sets, the splendid costumes, the biting irony of the story, and the quality of the acting which earned the film a cascade of awards, the admiration of the critics, and the support of the public. Georges Sadoul referred to "this important work, of exceptional beauty". Writing for The Spectator in 1936, Graham Greene gave the film a good review, praising director Feyder for his ability to add "into his ribald story a touch of the genuine, and simple emotion". Comparing the film to Restoration prose, Greene claims that the "photography moves with a fine strut", and summarizes it as "an admirable film, a little obscene like most good comedies, and beautifully acted". Feyder won the Best Director Award at the 4th Venice International Film Festival in 1936.

However, even on its first appearance in 1935 this tale of occupation and cheerful collaboration also caused uneasiness, and the screenwriter Henri Jeanson deplored the "Nazi inspiration" of the film. It was indeed enthusiastically praised in Germany, and its première in Berlin (15 January 1936) took place in the presence of Joseph Goebbels. (Yet, a few days after the outbreak of war in 1939, the film was banned in Germany and the occupied countries of Europe, and Jacques Feyder and Françoise Rosay subsequently sought refuge in Switzerland.)

It was in Belgium that the film caused greatest controversy, perhaps for the unflattering portrayal of Flemish leaders in the 17th century, or in suspicion of covert references to the German occupation of Belgian territory during the First World War. At any rate, the release of the film led to brawls in cinemas in Antwerp, Ghent, and Bruges.

In the Netherlands, the release of the film was heavily protested by various fascist and right wing authoritarian groups, who viewed it as an insult to the national history. At the first showing in the Amsterdam Tuschinski Theatre, violent clashes broke out between members of fascist organizations and police.

Even two decades later (1955), its enduring reputation irked François Truffaut who wrote, in a broadside against so-called 'successful' films: "In this regard, the most hateful film is unarguably La Kermesse héroïque because everything in it is incomplete, its boldness is attenuated; it is reasonable, measured, its doors are half-open, the paths are sketched and only sketched; everything in it is pleasant and perfect."

Nevertheless, this remains probably the most popular and widely known of Jacques Feyder's films.

== Awards ==
- 1936 Grand Prix du cinéma français
- 1936 4th Venice International Film Festival : Jacques Feyder, best director
- 1936 National Board of Review, USA : best foreign film
- 1937 New York Film Critics Circle Awards : best foreign film
- 1938 Kinema Junpo Awards : best foreign film

== Influences ==
The film was the basis for an American musical, called Carnival in Flanders, which was produced in 1953.
