= Meyerson =

Meyerson is a surname.

Notable people with the surname include:

- A. Frederick Meyerson (1918–2009), American politician and judge from New York
- Adi Meyerson (born 1991), Israeli jazz bassist
- Agda Meyerson (1866–1924), Swedish nurse and healthcare profession activist
- Alan Meyerson, American scoring mixer, recording engineer, and mixing engineer
- Arthur Meyerson (born 1949), American photographer
- Bernard S. Meyerson (born 1954), American physicist
- Beth Meyerson, American professor
- Charlie Meyerson, American journalist
- Émile Meyerson (1859–1933), Polish-born French chemist and philosopher of science
- Golda Meyerson, better known as Golda Meir (1898–1978), Russian-born Israeli politician
- Harold Meyerson (born 1950), American columnist
- Jin Meyerson (born 1972), American painter
- Jonah Meyerson (born 1991), American actor and producer
- Ken Meyerson (1964–2011), American tennis agent
- Martin Meyerson (1922–2007), American academic administrator
- Matthew Meyerson (born 1963), American pathologist
- Mitzi Meyerson, American harpsichordist and photographer
- Morton Meyerson (1938–2025), American businessman
- Per-Martin Meyerson (1927–2013), Swedish economist, entrepreneur and policy maker
- Rob Meyerson, American aerospace engineer and executive

== See also ==
- Morton H. Meyerson Symphony Center in Dallas, Texas
- Meyerson convention a defensive bidding convention in bridge
- Myerson
- Meyer (disambiguation)
- Meerzon
