= Françoise Rosay =

French actress and singer (1891–1974)

- Born: Françoise Bandy de Nalèche; 19 April 1891; Paris, French Third Republic
- Died: 28 March 1974 (aged 82); Montgeron, Île-de-France, France
- Other names: Frances Rosay; Rosay
- Years active: 1911–1973
- Spouse: Jacques Feyder (m. 1917; died 1948) 3 children

Françoise Rosay (French: [fʁɑ̃swaz ʁozɛ]; born Françoise Bandy de Nalèche; 19 April 1891 – 28 March 1974) was a French opera singer, diseuse, and actress who enjoyed a film career of over sixty years and who became a legendary figure in French cinema. She went on to appear in over 100 movies in her career.

== Life and career ==
Rosay was born Françoise Bandy de Nalèche in Paris, the illegitimate daughter of Marie-Thérèse Chauvin, an actress known as Sylviac. She originally planned to become an opera singer, and in 1917, won a prize at the Paris Conservatoire and made her debut at the Palais Garnier in the title role of Salammbô by Ernest Reyer. She also sang in Castor et Pollux by Rameau and Thaïs by Massenet.

Her first recorded film was Falstaff in 1911, and she began to work in Hollywood from 1929 onwards. In 1917, she married the director Jacques Feyder, with whom she remained until his death in 1948, having three sons. She appeared in several films under her husband's direction, including Le Grand Jeu (1933), Pension Mimosas (1934), La Kermesse héroïque (Carnival in Flanders) (1935) and Les Gens du voyage (1937). After the invasion of France in 1940, Rosay, not wanting to work for the Nazis or the collaborationist Vichy regime (like a small number of French actors and actresses, such as Jean Gabin, Michèle Morgan and Louis Jourdan), with Jacques Feyder left France and went to Switzerland where she starred in the film Une Femme disparaît (1941). Rosay spent the duration of World War II in Switzerland, where she taught acting classes at the Conservatoire de Genève, and England, where she broadcast resistance messages for the B.B.C. She still appeared in films during this time, notably the British Halfway House (1944) as the refugee French wife of a British sea captain.

During her career, she worked alongside many stars of French cinema, including Jean Gabin, Michèle Morgan, Raimu, Jeanne Moreau, Danielle Darrieux, Micheline Presle, Paul Meurisse, Gérard Philipe, Louis Jouvet, Michel Simon, Simone Signoret, Fernandel, and Jean-Louis Barrault. In Hollywood, she co-starred with Charles Boyer, Maurice Chevalier and Buster Keaton and worked with directors such as William Dieterle (September Affair, 1949), Martin Ritt (The Sound and the Fury, 1958), Ronald Neame (The Seventh Sin, 1956), and Peter Glenville (Me and the Colonel, 1957) with Danny Kaye. In England she appeared in The Alien Corn, a segment of the W. Somerset Maugham anthology film Quartet. A highly accomplished pianist herself in real life, she played the role of a famous piano virtuoso who gives aspiring pianist Dirk Bogarde a compassionate but honest and devastating critical appraisal of his likelihood of becoming a great musician – which results in his suicide. She performs in the film Schubert's Impromptu in E flat.

In 1950 she appeared on stage at London's Winter Garden Theatre, playing the title role in 'Madame Tic Tac' but it had only a short run.

It was not until 1938 that her biological father, Count François Louis Bandy de Nalèche, acknowledged her as his daughter.

Her final appearance on film was in the Maximilian Schell-directed Academy Award-nominated and Golden Globe-winner for Best Foreign-Language Foreign Film of 1974, Der Fußgänger (English title: The Pedestrian).

She died in Montgeron, Île-de-France, near Paris. Her grave is located in Sorel-Moussel, Île-de-France, where she is buried with her husband, movie director Jacques Feyder. They had three sons.

There are streets named after Françoise Rosay in Limoges, Montpellier, Chevry-Cossigny, Launaguet and Martigues.

== Partial filmography ==
- Les Vampires (1915)
- Crainquebille (1922)
- Gribiche (1926)
- Les Deux Timides (Two Timid Souls) (1928)
- Madame Récamier (1928)
- La Chance (Luck) (1931)
- Le Petit Café (The Little Cafe) (1931)
- Papa sans le savoir (A Father Without Knowing It) (1932)
- L'Abbé Constantin (The Abbot Constantine) (1933)
- Le Grand Jeu (1934)
- Die Insel (The Island) (1934)
- Coralie et Compagnie (1934)
- Pension Mimosas (1935)
- Maternité (Motherhood) (1935)
- Marchand d'amour (Merchant of Love) (1935)
- Remous (Whirlpool of Desire) (1935)
- La Kermesse héroïque (Carnival in Flanders) (1935)
- Jenny (1936)
- Die letzten Vier von Santa Cruz (The Last Four on Santa Cruz) (1936)
- Le Secret de Polichinelle (The Secret of Polichinelle) (1936)
- Un carnet de bal (Life Dances On) (1937)
- Drôle de drame (Bizarre, Bizarre) (1937)
- Mein Sohn, der Herr Minister (My Son the Minister) (1937)
- Les Gens du voyage (People Who Travel) (1938)
- Fahrendes Volk (People Who Travel) (1938)
- Ramuntcho (1938)
- Paix sur le Rhin (Peace on the Rhine) (1938)
- Le Joueur d'échecs (The Chess Player) (1938)
- Serge Panine (1939)
- The Wedding Trip (1939)
- Elles étaient douze femmes (They Were Twelve Women) (1940)
- Une femme disparaît (1942)
- The Halfway House (1944)
- Johnny Frenchman (1945)
- Macadam (Back Streets of Paris) (1946)
- Saraband for Dead Lovers (1948)
- Quartet (1948)
- Le Mystère Barton (The Barton Mystery) (1949)
- September Affair (1950)
- On n'aime qu'une fois (One Only Loves Once) (1950)
- Donne senza nome (Women Without Names) (1950)
- Maria Chapdelaine (The Naked Heart) (1950)
- The 13th Letter (1951)
- I figli di nessuno (Nobody's Children) (1951)
- L'Auberge rouge (The Red Inn) (1951)
- Wanda la peccatrice (The Shameless Sex) (1952)
- Chi è senza peccato (Who is Without Sin) (1952)
- Le Banquet des fraudeurs (The Smugglers' Banquet) (1952)
- Les Sept Péchés capitaux (The Seven Deadly Sins) (1952)
- La Reine Margot (Queen Margot) (1954)
- That Lady (1955)
- Ragazze d'oggi (Girls of Today) (1955)
- Me and the Colonel (1958)
- Die Gans von Sedan (The Goose of Sedan) (1959)
- The Sound and the Fury (1959)
- Les Yeux de l'amour (Eyes of Love) (1959)
- Between Love and Duty (1960)
- Stefanie in Rio (1960)
- The Full Treatment (1960)
- Frau Cheneys Ende (The Last of Mrs. Cheyney) (1961)
- Full Hearts and Empty Pockets (1964)
- La Métamorphose des cloportes (1965)
- Faut pas prendre les enfants du bon Dieu pour des canards sauvages (Leontine) (1968)
- Trois milliards sans ascenseur (1972)
- Not Dumb, The Bird (1972)
- Der Fußgänger (The Pedestrian) (1973)

== Bibliography ==
- Feyder, Jacques; Françoise Rosay (1944). Le Cinéma, notre métier. Genève: Skira.
- Rosay, Françoise (1974). La Traversée d'une vie. Paris: Robert Laffont.
