= Jacques Feyder =

Belgian actor, screenwriter and film director

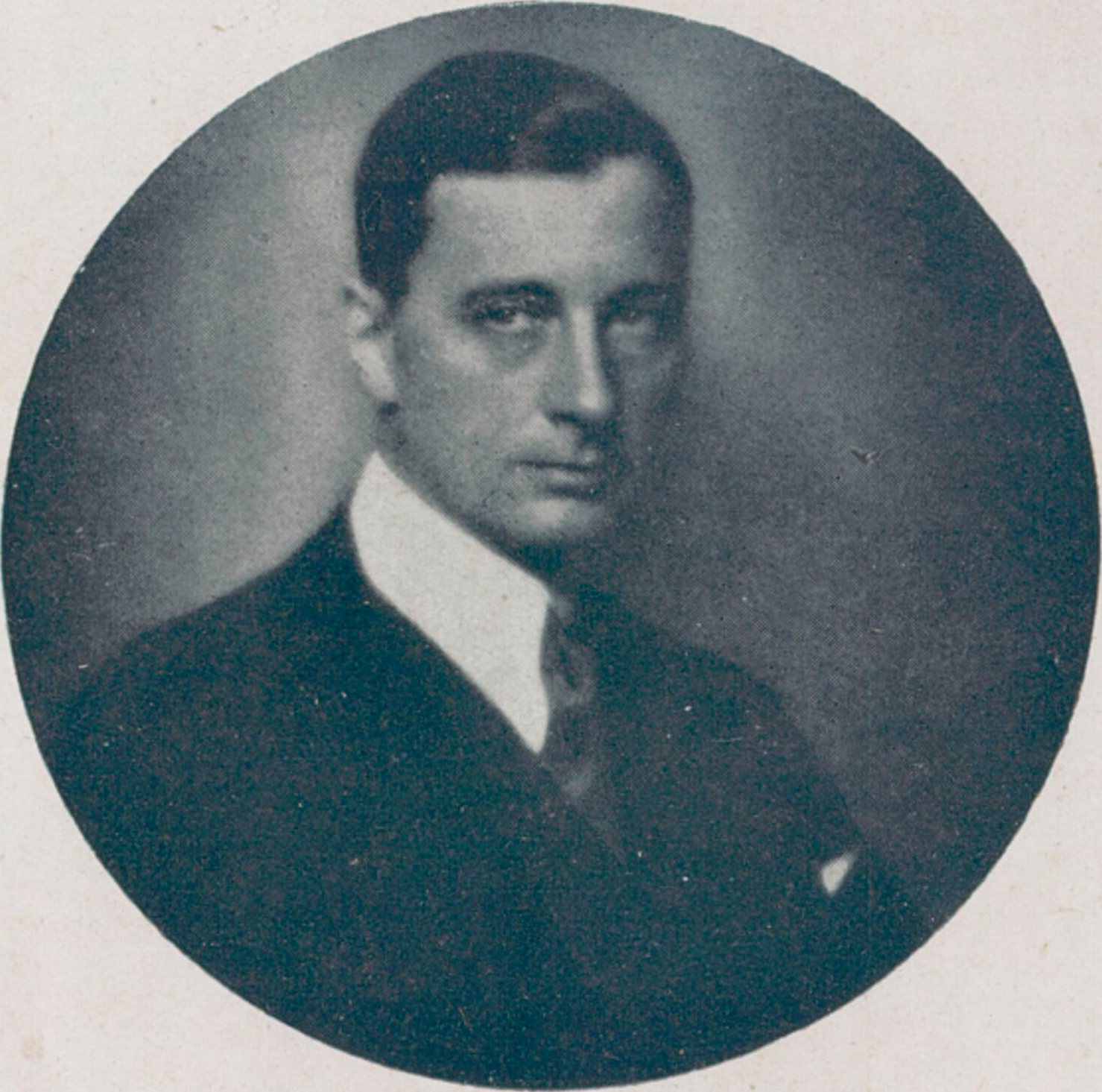
- Feyder in 1925
- Born: Jacques Léon Louis Frédérix; 21 July 1885; Ixelles, Belgium
- Died: 24 May 1948 (aged 62); Prangins, Switzerland
- Spouse: Françoise Rosay (m. 1917)

Jacques Feyder (French: [fɛ.dɛʁ]; 21 July 1885 – 24 May 1948) was a Belgian film director, screenwriter and actor who worked principally in France, but also in the US, Britain and Germany. He was a director of silent films during the 1920s, and in the 1930s he became associated with the style of poetic realism in French cinema. He adopted French nationality in 1928.

== Career ==
Born Jacques Léon Louis Frédérix in Ixelles, Belgium, he was educated at the École régimentaire in Nivelles, and was destined for a military career. At age twenty-five however he moved to Paris where he pursued an interest in acting, first on stage and then in film, adopting the name Jacques Feyder. He joined Gaumont and in 1914 he became an assistant director with Gaston Ravel. He started directing films for Gaumont in 1916, but his career was interrupted by service with the Belgian Army from 1917 to 1919 during World War I.

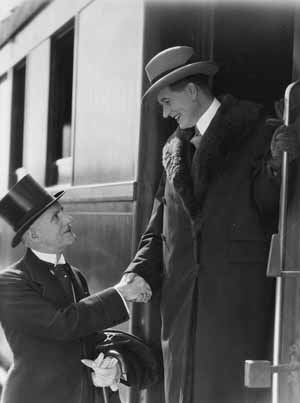
Henry Roussel and Albert Préjean (right) in Les Nouveaux Messieurs (1929)

After the end of the war, he returned to filmmaking and quickly built a reputation as one of the most innovative directors in French cinema. L'Atlantide (1921) (based on the novel by Pierre Benoit), and Crainquebille (1922) (from the novel by Anatole France) were his first major films to achieve public and critical attention. He followed these with Visages d'enfants (filmed in 1923 but not released until 1925) which proved to be one of his most personal and enduring films. Shortly after this, Feyder was offered a post as artistic director of a new film company, Vita Films, in Vienna, along with a contract to make three films. He made Das Bildnis (L'Image) (1923), but the company failed and he returned to Paris. He re-established himself with Gribiche (1926) and the literary adaptations of Carmen (1926) and Thérèse Raquin (1928). He also contributed screenplays of films for other directors, notably Poil de carotte (1925) for Julien Duvivier, and Gardiens de phare (1929) for Jean Grémillon. His last silent film in France was Les Nouveaux Messieurs, a topical political satire which provoked calls for it to be banned in France for "insulting the dignity of parliament and its ministers".

By this time Feyder had accepted an offer from MGM to work in Hollywood, where in 1929 his first project was directing Greta Garbo in The Kiss, her last silent film. It was in Hollywood that he made the transition to sound films; even before he had worked with sound films, Feyder declared himself to be a firm believer in their future, in contrast with some of his French contemporaries. In 1930, he directed Jetta Goudal in her only French language film made in Hollywood, Le Spectre vert. His subsequent work in the US consisted mainly of directing foreign-language versions of American films, including a German version of Anna Christie, again with Garbo.

Disillusioned with the Hollywood system, Feyder returned to France in 1933. During the next three years he made three of his most successful films, all of them in collaboration with screenwriter Charles Spaak and featuring Françoise Rosay in a leading role. Le Grand Jeu (1934) and Pension Mimosas (1935) were both significant creations in the style of poetic realism; La Kermesse héroïque (1935) (also known as Carnival in Flanders) was a meticulously staged period film which aroused some contemporary political resonances; it earned Feyder several international awards.

Feyder went on to direct films in England and Germany prior to the outbreak of World War II, but with diminishing success. Following the Nazi occupation in 1940, which led to the banning of La Kermesse héroïque, he left France for the safety of Switzerland, and directed a last film there, Une femme disparaît (1942).

In 1917, Feyder had married Parisian-born actress Françoise Rosay with whom he had three sons; she acted in many of his films and collaborated with him as writer and assistant director on Visages d'enfants. Jacques Feyder died in 1948 at Prangins, Switzerland, and he was buried in the Cimetière de Sorel Moussel, Eure et Loir, France. A school (lycée) in Épinay-sur-Seine in the north of Paris was named in his honour in 1977; Épinay was the location of the Tobis film studios where Feyder made Le Grand Jeu and Pension Mimosas.

== Reputation ==
In 1944 Feyder and Françoise Rosay published Le Cinéma, notre métier, an autobiographical memoir of their work together in the cinema, in which Feyder stated that he regarded himself as an artisan, a craftsman of filmmaking. Some critics have been content to take him at his word and to look no further for any underlying vision of the world. He was however insistent upon his creative independence, demonstrated by his willingness to make his films in so many different countries if the conditions of production appeared favourable. Recurrent themes in his work include the reckless love of a mysterious or unknown woman (L'Atlantide, L'Image, Carmen, Le Grand Jeu), the gap between reality and the vision that someone has of it (Crainquebille, Gribiche, Les Nouveaux Messieurs, La Kermesse héroïque), and maternal love (Gribiche, Visages d'enfants, Pension Mimosas).

His style was characterised by a classical balance and moderation, composition of images that was beautiful without becoming gratuitous, and a sympathetic rapport with actors. Above all his films achieved an atmosphere of realism, whether through the accumulation of judiciously chosen detail, the use of location shooting, or the use of elaborately designed sets; (he worked closely with Lazare Meerson on several of his films). In this respect, his adherence to a realistic tradition in French cinema was contrasted with the 'impressionist' style of some contemporaries in the 1920s such as Abel Gance, Marcel L'Herbier, and Jean Epstein, and it pointed the way to the vogue for poetic realism which found its fullest expression in the films of Marcel Carné: Carné worked as assistant director to Feyder in the mid-1930s.

Feyder's relatively early death may have contributed to a fading of interest in his films, reinforced by the hostility of some influential critics associated with Cahiers du cinéma in the 1950s. His younger contemporary René Clair judged in 1970, "Jacques Feyder does not occupy today the place his work and his example should have earned him". Any subsequent reassessment has tended to be hampered by the limited availability of his films in English-speaking countries, with the exception of La Kermesse héroïque which some reckon to have aged less well than other examples of his work. These factors have contributed to a sometimes ambivalent attitude to his work as a whole.

== Filmography ==
- 1915: Des pieds et des mains (assistant director)
- 1916: Monsieur Pinson policier
- 1916: Le Bluff
- 1916: Le Pied qui étreint
- 1916: Biscot se trompe d'étage
- 1916: Têtes de femmes, femmes de tête
- 1916: Un conseil d'ami
- 1916: L'Homme de compagnie
- 1916: Tiens, vous êtes à Poitiers?
- 1916: Le Frère de lait
- 1916: La Pièce de dix sous
- 1917: L'Instinct est maître
- 1917: Le Billard cassé
- 1917: Le Pardessus de demi-saison
- 1917: Abrégeons les formalités
- 1917: La Trouvaille de Buchu
- 1917: Les Vieilles Femmes de l'hospice
- 1917: Le Ravin sans fond (co-director)
- 1919: La Faute d'orthographe
- 1921: L'Atlantide
- 1922: Crainquebille
- 1923: Das Bildnis (L'Image/The Portrait)
- 1925: Visages d'enfants
- 1926: Gribiche
- 1926: Carmen
- 1926: Au pays du roi lépreux (uncompleted)
- 1928: Thérèse Raquin
- 1929: Les Nouveaux Messieurs
- 1929: The Kiss
- 1930: Le Spectre vert
- 1930: Si l'empereur savait ça
- 1930: Olympia (German version of Si l'empereur savait ça)
- 1930: Anna Christie (German version)
- 1931: Daybreak
- 1931: Son of India
- 1934: Le Grand Jeu
- 1935: Pension Mimosas
- 1935: La Kermesse héroïque
- 1936: Die Klugen Frauen (German version of La Kermesse héroïque)
- 1937: Knight Without Armour
- 1938: Les Gens du voyage (People Who Travel)
- 1938: Fahrendes Volk (German version of Les Gens du voyage) (Travelling People)
- 1939: La Loi du nord
- 1942: Une femme disparaît
- 1946: Macadam (supervision only)

== Bibliography ==
- Feyder, Jacques and Rosay, Françoise, Le cinéma, notre métier, (Genève: A. Skira, 1944). [In French]
- Gili, Jean A. & Marie, Michel [eds.], Jacques Feyder, (Paris: Association française de recherche sur l'histoire du cinéma, 1998. 1895, numéro hors série.) [In French]
