= People Who Travel (1938 French-language film) =

- Directed by: Jacques Feyder
- Written by: Jacques Feyder; Jacques Viot
- Starring: Françoise Rosay; André Brulé; Marie Glory; Sylvia Bataille
- Cinematography: Josef Illig; Franz Koch
- Edited by: Roger Spiri-Mercaton
- Music by: Wolfgang Zeller
- Production company: Tobis Film
- Distributed by: Tobis Film
- Release date: 4 March 1938 (France)
- Running time: 108 minutes
- Countries: France; Germany
- Language: French

People Who Travel (French: Les Gens du voyage) is a 1938 French-German film directed by Jacques Feyder. The film was a co-production with a separate German version Travelling People also released. It is a circus film.

It was shot at the Bavaria Studios in Munich. The film's sets were designed by the art director Jean D'Eaubonne.

== Plot ==
Due to an accident at the Barlay Circus, animal trainer Flora finds Fernand, a former prison escapee, and refers him to manager, Edouard Barlay. The son of Flora (and Fernand), Marcel, does the acrobatics with the manager's daughters, Suzanne and Yvonne. In love with the latter, Suzanne becomes jealous. Squire Pepita is also interested in the young man.

== Cast ==
- Françoise Rosay: La dompteuse Flora
- André Brulé: Fernand
- Marie Glory: Pepita
- Guillaume de Sax: Le directeur Edouard Barlay
- Sylvia Bataille: Yvonne Barlay
- Louise Carletti: Suzanne Barlay
- Fabien Loris: Marcel
- André Roanne: Le lieutenant de gendarmerie
- Yves Deniaud: Le bonimenteur
- Daniel Mendaille: Jo
- Georges Prieur: Gaëtan
- Yvonne Gall: Laëtitia
- André Nicolle: Le vétérinaire
- Lucien Brulé: Tino
- Alfred Adam: le médecin (not credited)
- And Raymond Aimos, Maurice Baquet, Jean Sinoël, Pierre Labry, Madeleine Sologne (not credited) ...

== Crew ==
- Written: Jacques Feyder and Jacques Viot
- Dialogue: Bernard Zimmer
- Photography: Franz Koch
- Décor: Jean d'Eaubonne
- Editing: Roger Mercanton
- Music: Wolfgang Zeller
- Assistant technician: André Roanne
- Producers: Société Films Sonores Tobis - Filmkunst Berlin
- Genre: Tragedy - Black and white - 121 mn

== German version ==
As was common at the time, the film was also filmed at studios in Munich in an alternative version, French and German, the technical team and stars being more or less different in each version.

Only Françoise Rosay kept her role as Flora in the German version, while other stars were: Hans Albers (Fernand), Camilla Horn (Pepita), Herbert Hübner (Edouard Barlay), Irene von Meyendorff (Yvonne Barlay), Ulla Ganglitz (Suzanne Barlay), Hannes Stelzer (Marcel), Aribert Mog (Le lieutenant).

== Production ==
Françoise Rosay refused to have a stunt double in scenes in which she was confronted by lions (cited by Jacques Siclier in Télérama in 1992).
