= Lazare Meerson =

French art director

- Born: 8 July 1900; Warsaw, Russian Empire (now Poland)
- Died: 28 June 1938 (aged 37); London, England
- Occupation: Art director
- Years active: 1925-1938
- Spouse: Mary Meerson
- Relatives: Harry Meerson (brother)

Lazare Meerson (1900–1938) was a French cinema art director. After emigrating from Soviet Russia in the early 1920s, he worked on French films of the late silent cinema and the early 1930s, particularly those directed by René Clair and Jacques Feyder. He worked in England during the last two years of his life. He had great influence on film set design in France in the years before World War II.

== Career ==
=== Early life ===
Lazare Meerson was born in Warsaw, which in 1900 was part of the Russian Empire. He may have begun studying painting and architecture in Russia, but after the revolution of 1917 he moved to Germany and by 1919 he had registered as an art student in Berlin. While in Berlin, he gained some experience of designing for the theatre, before leaving for Paris in 1923 or 1924.

=== In France ===
His first job in France in 1924 was at Films Albatros in Montreuil (a company which had been formed by Russian exiles in France) where he worked initially as a scene-painter and then as an assistant to some more experienced designers: Boris Bilinski (for L'Affiche), Alberto Cavalcanti (for Feu Mathias Pascal), and Pierre Kéfer (for Le Double Amour). By 1926, Meerson was appointed head of design at Albatros, and during the next three years he was responsible for the art direction on ten films. He formed particularly fruitful partnerships with Jacques Feyder (on Gribiche, Carmen, and Les Nouveaux Messieurs) and with René Clair (on La Proie du vent, Un chapeau de paille d'Italie, and Les Deux Timides).

In several of his set designs of the 1920s, Meerson employed a 'restrained modernism', as in the spacious art-deco home of the wealthy Mme Maranet in Gribiche, or the architectural interior of a dancer's apartment, with its big white surfaces and sparse ornaments in Les Nouveaux Messieurs, or the sumptuous premises of the banker Saccard in L'Argent, in which the large open spaces facilitated long camera movements and the complex interplay of light and shadow. Meerson, in 1927, said of his work: "It is an art of self-denial. The designer should constantly conceal himself before the other elements of the production. The frame should never encroach upon the work itself. The setting harmonises with the film. Released from it is that atmosphere which is so important both to the director and to the performers."

With the end of the silent film era, Lazare Meerson moved with René Clair to Films Sonores Tobis at Épinay-sur-Seine, where he was appointed chef-décorateur (head of design). Together Clair and Meerson worked on four of the most influential early sound films of French cinema, starting with Sous les toits de Paris (1930). These films created an image of Paris which came to be seen by the world as quintessential, filled with picturesque urban neighbourhoods and easily recognisable 'types' of character, stylised in presentation and already anachronistic. Meerson's designs moved away from the monumental architectural sets which had characterised some 1920s productions, to favour a more intimate and painterly style which employed realistic detail and the play of lighting to create atmosphere. Marcel Carné praised the impact of these artificial film sets, when created by filmmakers of talent: "If it is true that we would swear we had met in the street, in the course of our daily life, the varied characters of Sous les toits de Paris or of 14 Juillet, it is no less true that we would also swear we had suddenly found ourselves, while happily wandering around the city suburbs one day, face to face with one of the popular streets invented by Meerson. The blind-alley of the street singers, the dark lane which runs beside the Petite Ceinture railway, the little square for the dance in 14 Juillet, even though we know they are entirely constructed, they move us with their unrestrained authenticity, even more perhaps than if Clair and his team had actually taken us to the real locations of the story."

When Jacques Feyder returned to France in 1933 after spending several years in Hollywood, he renewed his working relationship with Meerson on three sound films in France. Their partnership reached its peak with La Kermesse héroïque in 1935, for which Meerson created, in a suburban Paris studio, the 16th century Flemish town of Boom, with its streets, canals, public buildings and house interiors making reference to the paintings of Brueghel, Hals, and de Hoogh. Even in this historical context, he sought to combine realism with stylization: "Here Meerson put to the test all his experiments using iron, glass, and oil paint on a large scale, and he found ingenious ways to adapt parts of the studio factory to give his fantasies ballast. Here he achieved that balance between authenticity and the imaginary that was his goal and trademark and that would set the tone for the work of his many disciples". In addition to his film work at this period, Meerson also undertook other design projects such as the refurbishment of the Paris home of Jacques Feyder and Françoise Rosay, and the creation of murals for the Casino in Monte Carlo.

=== In England ===
In 1936, Meerson moved to England, first at the invitation of Paul Czinner to work on a film of As You Like It, and then joining Alexander Korda at London Films for a further six films, commencing with Fire Over England. Most of these were made at Korda's newly built Denham Film Studios, whose huge resources initially impressed Meerson; subsequently however he began to have reservations about working for such a big studio with its Hollywood-style methods, and he missed the more intimate scale and personal relationships of his French productions. While he was working on the sets for The Citadel in 1938, Meerson contracted meningitis and died suddenly, shortly before his 38th birthday. Among those who attended his funeral were René Clair and Jacques Feyder.

== Reputation and influence ==
Shortly after his death, the director Alberto Cavalcanti wrote a tribute to Meerson in which he highlighted his personal qualities as a loyal and adaptable collaborator. He was described as "quiet, even taciturn; dependable, brilliant when brilliance was required, but having none of the instability which so often goes with brilliance."

Among the assistants or trainees who worked with Meerson on his French films during the 1930s were Alexandre Trauner, Jean d'Eaubonne and Georges Wakhévitch; they absorbed many of his ideas and their subsequent work in films saw the flowering of a style which has been given the label of poetic realism.

Meerson's influence upon the development of film set design was considerable. His personal style, marked by his Russian background and his experiences in Berlin, encouraged several trends in the cinema including that of poetic realism. His use of natural materials in the construction of sets, his carefully researched scenic recreations and his inventive use of false perspectives, always personally supervised at every stage of the work, established new standards in the art of film design.

== Personal life ==
Meerson was married to the ballet dancer and model Mary Meerson, who was Bulgarian born. (After his death she became the partner of Henri Langlois, founder of the Cinémathèque française.)

== Filmography ==
In the following films Meerson acted as set designer or art director.

Year	Original title	English title	Director	Notes
1924	L'Affiche	The Poster	Jean Epstein	LM assisting Boris Bilinsky
1924	Feu Mathias Pascal		Marcel L'Herbier	LM assisting Alberto Cavalcanti
1925	Le Double Amour		Jean Epstein	
1925	Le Nègre blanc		Nicolas Rimsky, Henry Wulschleger	
1925	Paris en cinq jours	Paris in Five Days	Nicolas Rimsky, Pierre Colombier	
1925	Les Aventures de Robert Macaire	The Adventures of Robert Macaire	Jean Epstein	
1926	Gribiche	Gribiche; Mother of Mine	Jacques Feyder	
1926	Carmen	Carmen	Jacques Feyder	
1927	Nocturne		Marcel Silver	Short film
1927	La Proie du vent	The Prey of the Wind	René Clair	
1927	Le Chasseur de chez Maxim's	The Porter from Maxim's	Nicolas Rimsky, Roger Lion	
1928	La condesa María		Benito Perojo	
1928	Un chapeau de paille d'Italie	The Italian Straw Hat	René Clair	
1928	Souris d’hôtel		Adelqui Migliar	
1928	Les Deux Timides	Two Timid Souls	René Clair	
1928	L'Argent		Marcel L'Herbier	LM with André Barsacq
1929	Les Nouveaux Messieurs	The New Gentlemen	Jacques Feyder	
1929	Cagliostro		Richard Oswald	LM with Alexander Ferenczy
1930	Le Requin	The Shark	Henri Chomette	
1930	Sous les toits de Paris	Under the Roofs of Paris	René Clair	LM assisted by Alexandre Trauner
1930	Le Mystère de la chambre jaune	The Mystery of the Yellow Room	Marcel L'Herbier	LM with André Barsacq and Lucien Jaquelux
1930	Romance sentimentale	Sentimental Romance	Sergei Eisenstein, Grigori Aleksandrov	Short film
1931	David Golder	David Golder	Julien Duvivier	
1931	L'Étrangère	The Foreigner	Gaston Ravel	Also Italian version La straniera (1930), and German version Die Fremde (1931)
1931	La Fin du monde	End of the World	Abel Gance	LM with César Lacca, Jean Perrier, Walter Ruttmann
1931	La Fine Combine		André Chotet	Short film.
1931	Le Million	Le Million; The Million	René Clair	LM assisted by Alexandre Trauner
1931	À nous la liberté	À nous la liberté; Freedom for Us	René Clair	LM assisted by Alexandre Trauner. Academy Award nomination for Best Art Direction.
1931	Le Monsieur de minuit	The Man at Midnight	Harry Lachman	
1931	Jean de la lune		Jean Choux	LM assisted by Alexandre Trauner
1931	Le Bal		Wilhelm Thiele	LM assisted by Alexandre Trauner
1931	Les Cinq Gentlemen maudits	The Five Accursed Gentlemen; Moon over Morocco	Julien Duvivier	LM assisted by Alexandre Trauner
1932	Un coup de téléphone	A Telephone Call	Georges Lacombe	LM with Eugène Lourié
1932	Prisonnier de mon cœur		Jean Tarride	
1932	La Femme en homme	The Woman Dressed as a Man	Augusto Genina	
1932	Conduisez-moi, Madame	Antoinette	Herbert Selpin	
1932	La Femme nue	The Nude Woman	Jean-Paul Paulin	
1932	Il a été perdu une mariée		Léo Joannon	
1933	Quatorze juillet	Bastille Day	René Clair	LM assisted by Alexandre Trauner
1933	Ciboulette	Ciboulette	Claude Autant-Lara	LM assisted by Alexandre Trauner
1933	La Femme invisible	The Invisible Woman	Georges Lacombe	
1934	Primerose		René Guissart	
1934	L'Ange gardien		Jean Choux	
1934	Lac aux dames	Lake of Ladies	Marc Allégret	LM assisted by Alexandre Trauner
1934	Le Grand Jeu		Jacques Feyder	LM assisted by Alexandre Trauner
1934	Poliche		Abel Gance	
1934	Amok		Fyodor Otsep	LM assisted by Alexandre Trauner
1934	La Banque Némo	Nemo's Bank	Marguerite Viel	
1934	L'Hôtel du libre échange	Hotel Free Exchange	Marc Allégret	LM assisted by Alexandre Trauner
1934	Zouzou		Marc Allégret	LM assisted by Alexandre Trauner
1935	Justin de Marseille		Maurice Tourneur	LM assisted by Alexandre Trauner
1935	Pension Mimosas		Jacques Feyder	LM assisted by Alexandre Trauner
1935	Princesse Tam-Tam	Princess Tam Tam	Edmond T. Gréville	LM assisted by Alexandre Trauner
1935	Les Beaux Jours	Beautiful Days	Marc Allégret	LM assisted by Jean d'Eaubonne
1935	La Kermesse héroïque	Carnival in Flanders	Jacques Feyder	LM assisted by Alexandre Trauner and Georges Wakhévitch (uncredited)
1936	As You Like It	As you Like It	Paul Czinner	LM assisted by Alexandre Trauner
1937	Fire Over England	Fire Over England	William K. Howard	
1937	Knight Without Armour	Knight Without Armour	Jacques Feyder	
1937	The Return of the Scarlet Pimpernel	The Return of the Scarlet Pimpernel	Hanns Schwarz	
1938	South Riding	South Riding	Victor Saville	
1938	Break the News	Break the News	René Clair	
1938	The Divorce of Lady X	The Divorce of Lady X	Tim Whelan	LM assisted by Paul Sheriff and Alec Waugh.
1938	The Citadel	The Citadel	King Vidor	Art direction completed by Alfred Junge after LM's death.
