= Le Grand Jeu (1934 film) =

1934 film

- Theatrical release poster
- Directed by: Jacques Feyder
- Written by: Jacques Feyder; Charles Spaak
- Produced by: Alexandre Kamenka
- Starring: Pierre Richard-Willm; Marie Bell; Charles Vanel; Françoise Rosay
- Cinematography: Maurice Forster; Harry Stradling
- Edited by: Jacques Brillouin
- Music by: Hanns Eisler
- Production company: Films de France
- Distributed by: Pathé-Natan
- Release date: 2 May 1934
- Running time: 111 minutes (on DVD 2007); original runtime quoted as 115 or 120 minutes
- Country: France
- Language: French

Le Grand Jeu is a 1934 French drama film directed by Jacques Feyder and starring Pierre Richard-Willm, Marie Bell, Charles Vanel and Françoise Rosay. It is a romantic drama set against the background of the French Foreign Legion, and the film was an example of poetic realism in the French cinema. The title Le Grand Jeu refers to the practice of reading the cards. Blanche asks whether her client wants the 'full works', the whole story: "Alors... je te fais le grand jeu?"

== Plot ==
Pierre Martel (Pierre Richard-Willm), a young Parisian businessman, is brought to financial ruin and disgrace through the extravagant lifestyle that he pursues with his lover Florence (Marie Bell). Forced to leave the country, he joins the Foreign Legion, as Pierre Muller, and seeks to submerge his own despair in a new life in North Africa alongside other unhappy refugees such as the Russian Nicolas (Georges Pitoëff). When not on campaign, they lodge in a cheap hotel run by the greedy and lecherous Clément (Charles Vanel) and his sadly stoical wife Blanche (Françoise Rosay), who passes the time by reading the cards to tell her customers their fortunes.

When Pierre encounters Irma (Marie Bell) working in a local bar as a singer and a prostitute, he finds her almost identical to his former lover Florence, except for her voice and the colour of her hair. Irma is vague about her past and Pierre becomes ever more obsessed with the apparent reincarnation of his old love. They live together at the hotel, and when Clément forces himself on Irma, Pierre kills him in a struggle; Blanche makes it appear to be an accident.

When Pierre's term of service finishes, he and Irma plan a new life together back in France where he has now inherited some money. But on the eve of their embarkation in Casablanca, Pierre happens to meet again the real Florence, now mistress to a wealthy Arab, and his feelings for Irma are shattered. Having duped Irma into returning to France alone, he re-enlists in the Legion. Blanche's cards foretell a brave death for him in his next campaign.

== Cast ==
- Marie Bell as Florence / Irma
- Pierre Richard-Willm as Pierre Martel / Pierre Muller
- Charles Vanel as Clément
- Françoise Rosay as Blanche
- Georges Pitoëff as Nicolas Ivanoff
- Camille Bert as Le colonel
- André Dubosc as Bernard Martel
- Pierre Larquey as Gustin
- Lyne Clevers as La môme Dauville
- Harry Nestor as Aziani
- Pierre de Guingand as Le capitaine
- Louis Florencie as Fenoux
- Pierre Labry as Le cantinier
- Claude Marcy as La voix d'Irma
- Olga Velbria as Aïchouch
- Jacques Normand as Le capitaine du recrutement

== Production ==
Jacques Feyder had been working in Hollywood since 1929. However, in 1932, when he and MGM failed to reach an agreement on any new projects, he returned to France. One of his last unrealized projects in Hollywood had been to direct Greta Garbo in an adaptation of Pirandello's Come tu mi vuoi (As You Desire Me), in which he proposed to give a different voice to Garbo for part of her role. He carried this same idea into the scenario for Le Grand Jeu, in which two different roles would be played by the same actress, but with one of them dubbed by a different voice to create a disconcerting dramatic effect. Marie Bell's own voice was used in the role of Florence, but Claude Marcy dubbed her voice in the character of Irma. (Marcy also regularly dubbed the dialogue of Greta Garbo for French distribution of her films.)

With Charles Spaak as his scenarist, Feyder developed a romantic drama set in the colonial world of French North Africa, which he had previously explored in his silent film L'Atlantide. For the central character of Pierre, Feyder had originally wanted Charles Boyer, but after a disagreement between them he chose the popular film and theatre actor Pierre Richard-Willm. The supporting cast included Charles Vanel and Feyder's wife Françoise Rosay.

It was filmed at the Epinay Studios in Paris and on location around Agadir in French Morocco. Filming took place in the autumn of 1933, and the film was released in May 1934. In addition to the atmospheric set designs of art director Lazare Meerson, Feyder wanted to film some scenes on location. When however he took his cast and crew to Morocco, he failed to obtain the cooperation of the Legion for his story, and he was obliged to film some scenes of legionnaires at work and on the march in real life as though he were making a documentary.

One of the assistant directors on this film (and others by Feyder) was Marcel Carné, some of whose later films (Le Quai des brumes, Le jour se lève) would create a similar mood of romantic fatalism.

The film was rejected by the British Board of Film Censors when it was originally submitted in 1934; it was subsequently shown at London's Academy cinema in 1946 with an "A" certificate.

== Reception ==
On its release in France, the film enjoyed considerable success, and was rated one of the best French films of 1934 by both the public and the press. In addition to its superior production values, there was much interest in the technical device of the double role with a dubbed voice. A contemporary film historian wrote: "Le Grand Jeu is one of the few films to have made use of a new idea since talkies came in. This might not have been sufficient to hold our attention but for a certain vulgar brutality which sustained the interest of the plot. Though the film was overromantic, we had the impression of seeing real people. ...There is a rare quality of truthfulness which always saves Feyder, and his rather vulgar characters exude a strange atmosphere of destiny and death." The same author concluded that "out of this rather absurd plot, Feyder made a profoundly human film".

Critics have subsequently tended to find weaknesses in the acting of the two principals, now overshadowed by the supporting contributions of the better-known Charles Vanel and Françoise Rosay, but the vivid portrayal of a colonial garrison has continued to impress.

== Influence ==
Le Grand Jeu contributed to the series of films which used the French Foreign Legion as a colourful background. It was followed in 1935 by Julien Duvivier's La Bandera, also scripted by Charles Spaak, though actually about the Spanish Foreign Legion. Other French films with similar background were Un de la légion (1936, dir. Christian-Jaque - a comedy with Fernandel) and Les Hommes sans nom (1937, dir. Jean Vallée). Meanwhile, American cinema showed a continuing interest in the Foreign Legion with remakes of Beau Geste and Under Two Flags, among many others.

Le Grand Jeu was also one of the films which defined a characteristic mood of romantic despair in the French cinema of the 1930s, a mood shared by films such as Pépé le Moko, Hôtel du Nord, Le Quai des brumes, and Le jour se lève.

Although there is no reason to claim a connection, the theme of a man re-inventing a new lover in the image of his old one was later explored by Alfred Hitchcock in Vertigo.

A 1954 remake of Le Grand Jeu was directed by Robert Siodmak and featured Gina Lollobrigida and Arletty. It was released in the USA as Flesh and the Woman and in the UK as The Card of Fate.
