= Charles Spaak =

Belgian screenwriter (1903–1975)

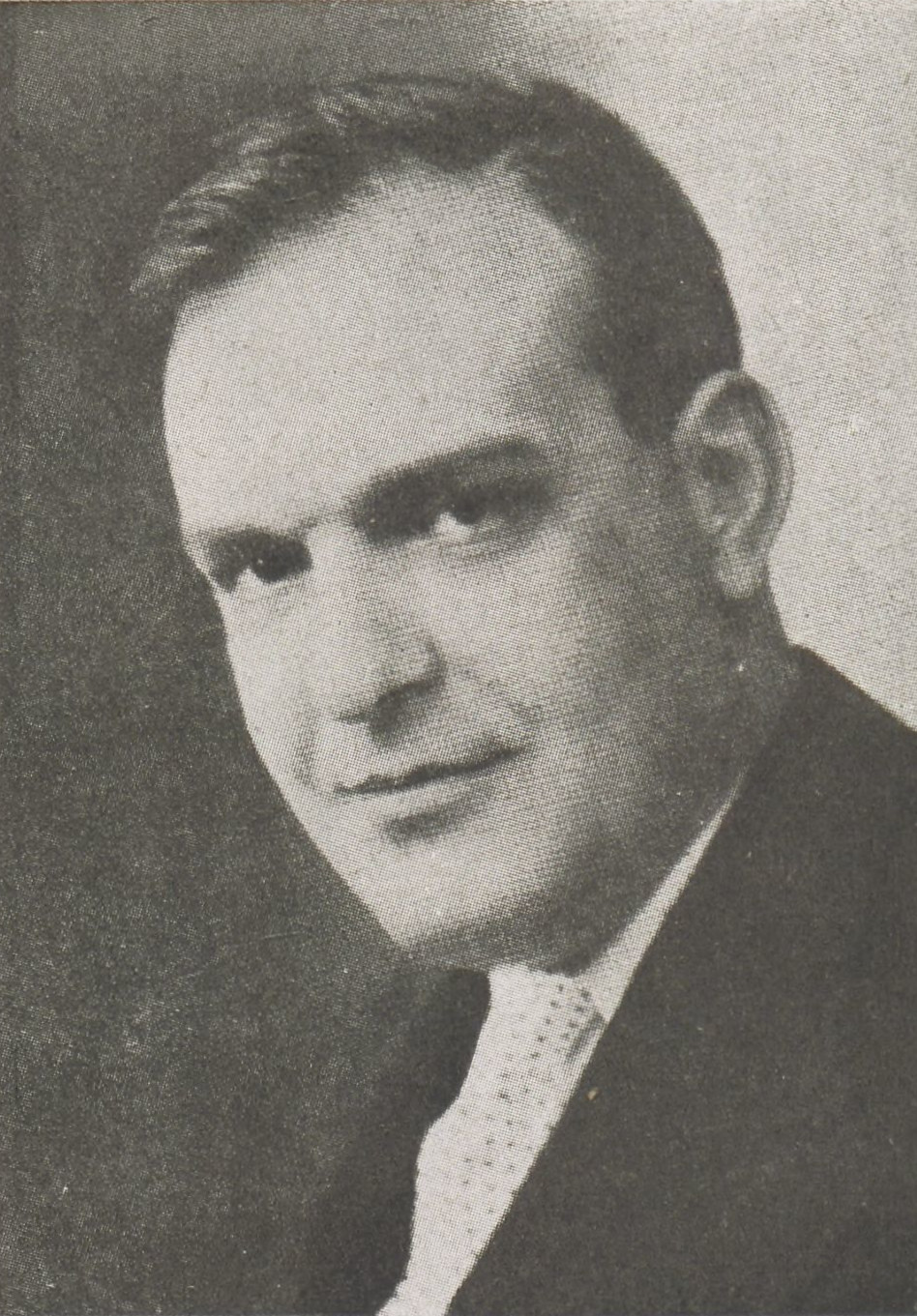
- Born: 25 May 1903; Brussels, Belgium
- Died: 4 March 1975 (aged 71); Vence, Alpes-Maritimes, France
- Occupation: Screenwriter

Charles Spaak (25 May 1903 – 4 March 1975) was a Belgian screenwriter who was noted particularly for his work in the French cinema during the 1930s. He was the son of the dramatist and poet Paul Spaak, the brother of the politician Paul-Henri Spaak, and the father of the actresses Catherine Spaak and Agnès Spaak.

== Career ==
Charles Spaak was born in Brussels in 1903 into a prominent Belgian family. In 1928 he moved to Paris and took a post as secretary to the film-maker Jacques Feyder, who then asked him to work on the adaptation of a stage play for his film Les Nouveaux Messieurs. He also worked as head of publicity for the production company Albatros. He went on to write the screenplays for Feyder's most important films of the 1930s: Le Grand Jeu, Pension Mimosas, and La Kermesse héroïque. Spaak was also in demand to work with other leading directors. During the 1930s he worked with Julien Duvivier on La Bandera (1935) and La Belle Équipe (1936), and with Jean Grémillon on La Petite Lise (1930) and Gueule d'amour (1937). He also collaborated with Jean Renoir on two of his major films, Les Bas Fonds (1936) and La Grande Illusion (1937).

Many of these films of the 1930s are marked by a concern for realistic detail with sharply written dialogue, often pessimistic in tone, and several of them provided leading roles which were played by Jean Gabin. He established himself, alongside Jacques Prévert and Henri Jeanson, as a leading screenwriter during one of the French cinema's richest periods.

During the German occupation of France, Spaak chose to return to Paris and found work on a number of the wartime productions that were made there, including further films with Duvivier and Grémillon. (In Bertrand Tavernier's film Laissez-passer (2001) which gives a detailed picture of how film-making continued in occupied Paris, Spaak is portrayed in 1943 when he was working on a film for the Continental Films production company while in prison.)

After the war Spaak worked with new directors and in a wider range styles, and he formed a particular association with André Cayatte in a series of films set against a background of the French judicial system: Justice est faite (1950), Nous sommes tous les assassins (1951), Avant le deluge (1953), and Le Dossier noir (1955). He also undertook some of the literary adaptations which marked the 'quality cinema' of the 1950s, including Thérèse Raquin (1953) and Crime et Châtiment (1956).

In 1949 Spaak made his only venture into directing with Le Mystère Barton, but the film met with little success.

Charles Spaak continued working selectively on scenarios until the early 1970s, and he died in 1975 in Vence in the South of France.

== Selective list of screenplays ==
Charles Spaak wrote or contributed to more than 100 film screenplays, including the following:

- Les Nouveaux Messieurs / The New Gentlemen (1929, d. Jacques Feyder)
- La Petite Lise / Little Lise (1930, d. Jean Grémillon)
- Daïnah la métisse / Dainah the Mulatto (1932, d. Jean Grémillon)
- Un coup de téléphone / 'A Telephone Call (1932, d. Georges Lacombe)
- Ce cochon de Morin / That Scoundrel Morin (1932, d. Georges Lacombe)
- Le Grand Jeu (1934, d. Jacques Feyder)
- Pension Mimosas (1935, d. Jacques Feyder)
- La Bandera (1935, d. Julien Duvivier)
- Les Beaux Jours / Beautiful Days (1935. d. Marc Allégret)
- Adémaï au Moyen-Âge / Adémaï in the Middle Ages (1935, d. Jean de Marguenat)
- Les Époux scandaleux / The Scandalous Couple (1935, d. Georges Lacombe)
- La Kermesse héroïque / Carnival in Flanders (1935, d. Jacques Feyder)
- Veille d'armes (1935, d. Marcel L'Herbier)
- Les Bas-fonds / The Lower Depths (1936. d. Jean Renoir)
- La Belle Équipe / They Were Five (1936, d. Julien Duvivier)
- Les Loups entre eux / Wolves Between Them (1936, d. Léon Mathot)
- La Porte du large (1936, d. Marcel L'Herbier)
- L’Homme du jour / The Man of the Hour (1937, d. Julien Duvivier)
- Aloha, le chant des îles (1937, d. Léon Mathot)
- La Grande Illusion (1937, d. Jean Renoir)
- Gueule d'amour / Lady Killer (1937, d. Jean Grémillon)
- Mollenard (1938, d. Robert Siodmak)
- L'Étrange Monsieur Victor / The Strange Monsieur Victor (1938, d. Jean Grémillon)
- La Fin du jour / The End of the Day (1939. d. Julien Duvivier)
- Le Récif de corail / Coral Reefs (1939, d. Maurice Gleize)
- Le Dernier Tournant / The Last Turning (1939, d. Pierre Chenal)
- Remorques / Stormy Waters (1939, released 1941, d. Jean Grémillon)
- Untel père et fils / The Heart of a Nation (1940, released 1943, d. Julien Duvivier)
- L'Assassinat du père Noël / Who Killed Santa Claus? (1941, d. Christian-Jaque)
- Péchés de jeunesse / Sins of Youth (1941, d. Maurice Tourneur)
- Le Lit à colonnes (1942, d. Roland Tual)
- Le ciel est à vous / The Woman Who Dared (1944, d. Jean Grémillon)
- Les Caves du Majestic / Majestic Hotel Cellars (1944, d. Richard Pottier)
- L'Affaire du collier de la reine / The Queen's Necklace (1946, d. Marcel L'Herbier)
- Panique / Panic (1946, d. Julien Duvivier)
- Éternel Conflit / Eternal Conflict (1948, d. Georges Lampin)
- Le Mystère Barton The Barton Mystery (1949, d. Charles Spaak)
- Black Jack (1950, d. Julien Duvivier)
- Justice est faite / Justice Is Done (1950, d. André Cayatte)
- Adorables créatures (1952, d. Christian-Jaque)
- Le Banquet des fraudeurs / The Smugglers' Banquet (1952, d. Henri Storck)
- Nous sommes tous des assassins / We Are All Murderers (1952, d. André Cayatte)
- Thérèse Raquin (1953, d. Marcel Carné)
- Avant le déluge / Before the Deluge (1954, d. André Cayatte)
- Le Dossier noir / Black Dossier (1955, d. André Cayatte)
- Scuola elementare (1955, d. Alberto Lattuada)
- Crime et Châtiment / Crime and Punishment (1956, d. Georges Lampin)
- Paris, Palace Hotel (1956, d. Henri Verneuil)
- Charmants Garçons / Charming Boys ( (1957, d. Henri Decoin)
- Quand la femme s'en mêle / Send a Woman When the Devil Fails (1957, d. Yves Allégret)
- Cartouche (1962, d. Philippe de Broca)
- La Chambre ardente / The Burning Court (1962, d. Julien Duvivier)
- Le Glaive et la Balance / Two Are Guilty (1962, d. André Cayatte)
- Germinal (1963, d. Yves Allégret)
- Mathias Sandorf (1963, d. Georges Lampin)
- La Main à couper (1974, d. Étienne Périer)
