= Arthur Meyerson =

American photographer (born 1949)

- Born: February 22, 1949 (age 77); Houston
- Education: University of Oklahoma
- Known for: Photography

Arthur Meyerson (born February 22, 1949) is an American photographer who specializes in advertising, editorial, and fine art photography.

== Life and work ==
He graduated from the University of Oklahoma in 1971 with a degree in journalism.

Since 1974 he has embarked on photographic assignments and projects across the world while working for such companies as Coca-Cola, Apple, Travel + Leisure, and United Airlines. He has produced photographic series on such places as Antarctica, China, Cuba, Iceland, Portugal, Turkey, and Japan. His books The Color of Light (2012) and The Journey (2017) feature selections of images from across his career.

Meyerson won a gold medal from the New York Art Directors Club in 1985 and the Stephen Kelly Award in 1990 for his images for a Nike advertising campaign; Adweek named him "Southwest Photographer of the Year" three times—in 1983, 1988, and 1990. In 1999 Nikon added him to its list of "Legends Behind the Lens."

Meyerson previously served on the advisory council for the Santa Fe Center for Photography and on the board of advisors for the Houston Center for Photography; he has served on the board of advisors for Santa Fe Photographic Workshops since 1997.

== Collections ==
Meyerson's work is held in the following permanent collections:

- Gaylord College of Journalism and Mass Communication at the University of Oklahoma
- The Grace Museum (Abilene, Texas)
- Harry Ransom Center (Austin)
- Library of Congress
- Museum of New Zealand Te Papa Tongerewa
- Portland Museum of Art (Maine)
- Wittliff Collection of Southwestern and Mexican Photography (Texas State University)
- Museum of Fine Arts, Houston
