= Carmen (1926 film) =

1926 film

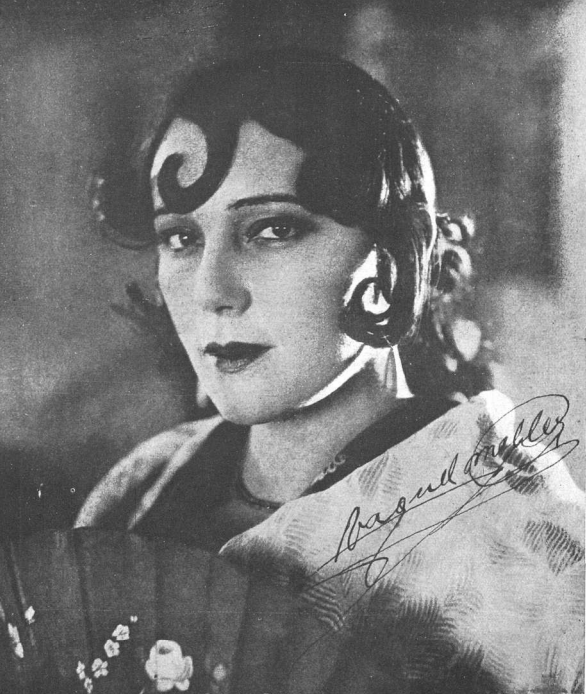
- Raquel Meller as Carmen
- Directed by: Jacques Feyder
- Written by: Jacques Feyder; Prosper Mérimée (novel)
- Produced by: Alexandre Kamenka
- Starring: Raquel Meller; Fred Louis Lerch; Gaston Modot
- Cinematography: Maurice Desfassiaux; Paul Parguel
- Edited by: Henriette Caire; Jacques Feyder
- Music by: Ernesto Halffter
- Production company: Films Albatros
- Distributed by: Les Films Armor
- Release date: November 5, 1926
- Running time: 160 minutes
- Country: France
- Languages: Silent; French intertitles

The 1926 film Carmen is a French silent drama based on Prosper Mérimée's 1845 novel Carmen, directed by Jacques Feyder and starring Raquel Meller, Fred Louis Lerch and Gaston Modot. The film's art direction was by Lazare Meerson. Luis Buñuel, later famous as a director, had a small role.

Full film

== Cast ==
- Raquel Meller as Carmen
- Fred Louis Lerch as José Lizarrabengoa
- Gaston Modot as García 'El Tuerto'
- Jean Murat as Officier
- Victor Vina as Le Dancaire
- Guerrero de Xandoval as Lucas, le picador
- Charles Barrois as Lillas Pastia
- Georges Lampin as Contrebandier
- Raymond Guérin-Catelain as Duc d'El Chorbas
- Andrée Canti as a woman
- Luis Buñuel as Contrebandier chez lillas pastia
- Pedro de Hidalgo as El Remendado
- Arthur Duarte
- Charles Morat as Officier
- Joaquim Peindo as Guitar player
- Hernando Vines as Guitar player
- Roy Wood as Officier anglais

== Bibliography ==
- Zanger, Anat. Film Remakes as Ritual and Disguise: From Carmen to Ripley. Amsterdam University Press, 2006.
