= The Citadel (1938 film) =

1938 British film by King Vidor

- Directed by: King Vidor
- Screenplay by: Ian Dalrymple; Frank Wead; Elizabeth Hill
- Based on: The Citadel; 1937 novel by A. J. Cronin
- Produced by: Victor Saville
- Starring: Robert Donat; Rosalind Russell; Ralph Richardson; Rex Harrison
- Cinematography: Harry Stradling
- Edited by: Charles Frend
- Music by: Louis Levy; Charles Williams
- Production company: Metro-Goldwyn-Mayer British
- Distributed by: Metro-Goldwyn-Mayer
- Release date: 3 November 1938
- Running time: 110 minutes
- Country: United Kingdom
- Language: English
- Budget: $1,012,000 or £222,386
- Box office: $2,598,000

The Citadel is a 1938 British drama film based on the 1937 novel of the same name by A. J. Cronin. The film was directed by King Vidor and produced by Victor Saville for Metro-Goldwyn-Mayer British at Denham Studios. It stars Robert Donat and Rosalind Russell. The film and book helped the creation of Britain's NHS in 1947.

== Plot ==
Dr. Andrew Manson is an idealistic, newly qualified Scottish doctor dedicated to treating the Welsh miners suffering from tuberculosis in the Welsh mining village of Blaenelly and is an apprentice to Dr. Page. Initially, he has many lofty scientific goals, but meets local resistance in his research. After his laboratory and notes are destroyed by the miners, he moves to London, treating working-class patients in impoverished conditions. There, his purpose erodes when a chance encounter with a medical school friend, Dr. Frederick Lawford leads to his quiet seduction by an unethical medical establishment, treating rich hypochondriacs. Christine, his wife, tries to set him back on the original path. When Dr. Philip Denny, Manson's best friend and still working for improved working-class health, dies at the hands of an incompetent, social-climbing surgeon, Manson realises that he has been pursuing money and comfort at the expense of his medical ideals.

== Differences from other versions ==
The film is based on the novel, but departs from it in certain vital respects. In the original text, the character of Christine Manson is killed off in a road accident at the point when she and her husband have begun to address problems in their relationship. The incident involving the incompetent surgeon occurs, but it is a minor character who dies. Denny survives, and the understanding (not related in the book but implied) is that he and Manson went into practice together. A 1982 BBC radio adaptation of the novel stays closer to the original text.

== Cast ==
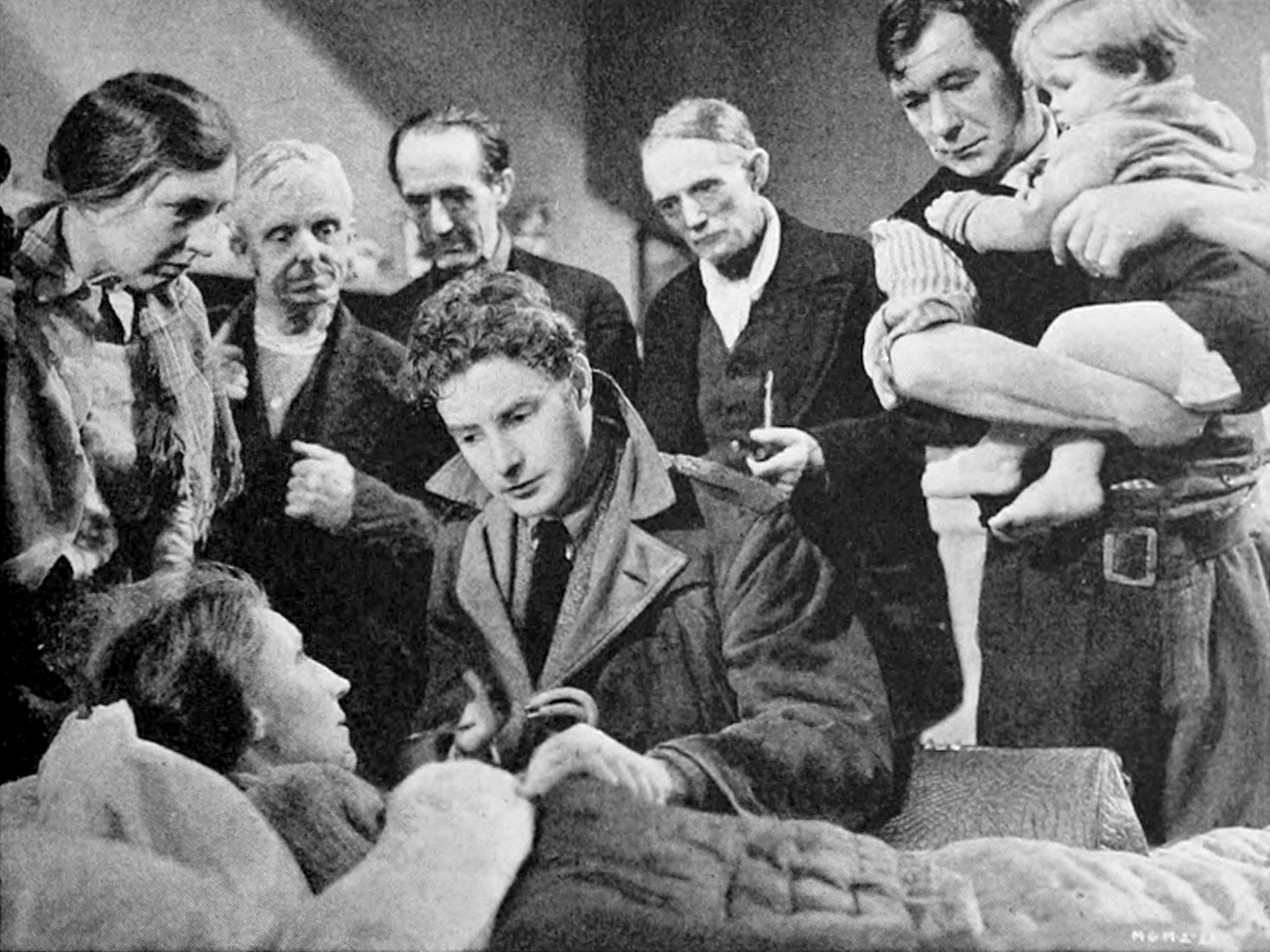
Robert Donat in The Citadel

- Robert Donat as Dr. Andrew Manson
- Rosalind Russell as Christine Barlow
- Ralph Richardson as Dr. Philip Denny
- Rex Harrison as Dr. Frederick Lawford
- Emlyn Williams as Mr. Owen
- Penelope Dudley Ward as Toppy LeRoy
- Francis L. Sullivan as Ben Chenkin
- Mary Clare as Mrs. Orlando
- Cecil Parker as Charles Every
- Percy Parsons as Richard Stillman
- Basil Gill as Dr. Edward Page
- Dilys Davis as Blodwen Page
- Joss Ambler as Dr. Llewellyn
- Nora Swinburne as Mrs. Thornton
- Edward Chapman as Joe Morgan
- Athene Seyler as Lady Raebank
- Felix Aylmer as Mr. Boon
- Elliott Mason as District Nurse
- Joyce Bland as Nurse Sharp
- Eliot Makeham as Dai Jenkins
- D.J. Williams as Old Thomas
- Ruth Morgan as a worried family member (extra)

== Box office ==
The film earned $987,000 in the US and Canada and $1,611,000 elsewhere.

== Awards ==
The film was nominated for Oscars in four categories: Best Picture, Best Actor (Robert Donat), Directing, and Adapted Screenplay.

The film won the Best Picture Award from both the New York Film Critics Circle and the National Board of Review. It is a New York Times Critics' Pick and is also listed in The New York Times Guide to the Best 1,000 Movies Ever Made.

== Legacy ==
A Hindi-language film, Tere Mere Sapne, based on the A.J. Cronin novel, was released in 1971.

In February 2020, the film was shown at the 70th Berlin International Film Festival, as part of a retrospective dedicated to King Vidor's career.
