= People Who Travel (1938 German-language film) =

1938 film

Travelling People
- Directed by: Jacques Feyder
- Written by: Jacques Feyder; Jacques Viot; Bernard Zimmer
- Produced by: Robert Leistenschneider; Helmut Schreiber
- Starring: Hans Albers; Françoise Rosay; Camilla Horn; Hannes Stelzer
- Cinematography: Josef Illig; Franz Koch
- Edited by: Wolfgang Wehrum
- Music by: Wolfgang Zeller
- Production company: Tobis Film
- Distributed by: Tobis Film
- Release date: 1 July 1938
- Running time: 106 minutes
- Country: Germany
- Language: German

Travelling People (German: Fahrendes Volk) is a 1938 German drama film directed by Jacques Feyder and starring Hans Albers, Françoise Rosay and Camilla Horn. It is a circus film.

It was shot at the Bavaria Studios in Munich. A separate French-language version People Who Travel (Les gens du voyage) was also released. While it was also directed by Feyder and starred Rosay, the rest of the cast were different. It premiered in Hamburg on 1 July 1938 and then at the Ufa-Palast am Zoo on 18 July.

== Cast ==
- Hans Albers as Fernand
- Françoise Rosay as Madame Flora
- Camilla Horn as Pepita
- Hannes Stelzer as Marcel
- Irene von Meyendorff as Yvonne Barlay
- Ulla Gauglitz as Suzanne
- Herbert Hübner as Zirkusdirektor Edward Barlay
- Alexander Golling as Ganove Tino
- Otto Stoeckel as Charlot
- Aribert Mog as Gendarmerieleutnant
- Hedwig Wangel as Wirtschafterin Yvonnes im Zirkus
- Willem Holsboer as Verehrer Pepitas
- Franz Arzdorf as Präfekt
- Bob Bauer as Raubtierverkäufer
- Lilo Bergen as Autogrammjägerinnen
- Willy Cronauer as Inspizient im Zirkus in Paris
- Toni Forster-Larrinaga as Ledhrerin
- Friedrich Gnaß as Bosko
- Walter Holten as Joe
- Magda Lena as Yvonnes Tante
- Karl Platen as Registrarbeamter
- Erwin van Roy as Mann, der den Zirkus ankündigt
- Tilly Wedekind as Reiche Amerikanin
- Herbert Weissbach as Pepitas Verehrer
- Philipp Veit as Älterer Verehrer Pepitas
- Franz Schönemann as Gendarm
- Elsa Andrä Beyer as Autogramjägerinen
- Hans Alpassy as Raubtierwärter
- Elise Aulinger as Löwenfellgerberin
- Hans Hanauer as Alte Arzt
- Hermann Kellein as Gigolo
- Richard Korn as Schneidermeister bei der Zirkusparade
- Reinhold Lütjohann as Fleischlieferant für die Tiere im Zirkus
- Luise Morland as Mädchen bei Hotel du Nord
- Theodolinde Müller as Tanzschülerin
- Rudolf Raab as Personalchef im Kaufhaus
- Eugen Schöndorfer as Kassierer bei Barlay
- Edith von Wilpert as Tanzschullehrerin

== Bibliography ==
- Schoeps, Karl-Heinz. Literature and Film in the Third Reich. Camden House, 2004.
