= Harry Meerson =

French photographer

Harry Ossip Meerson (1910 or 1911 – 7 May 1991) was a French photographer.

Harry Ossip Meerson was born in Warsaw, Poland in either 1910 or 1911.

His elder brother Lazare Meerson was an influential art director in French cinema of the 1920s and 1930s.
