= Christophe Colomb =

Opera by Darius Milhaud

- Opera by Darius Milhaud
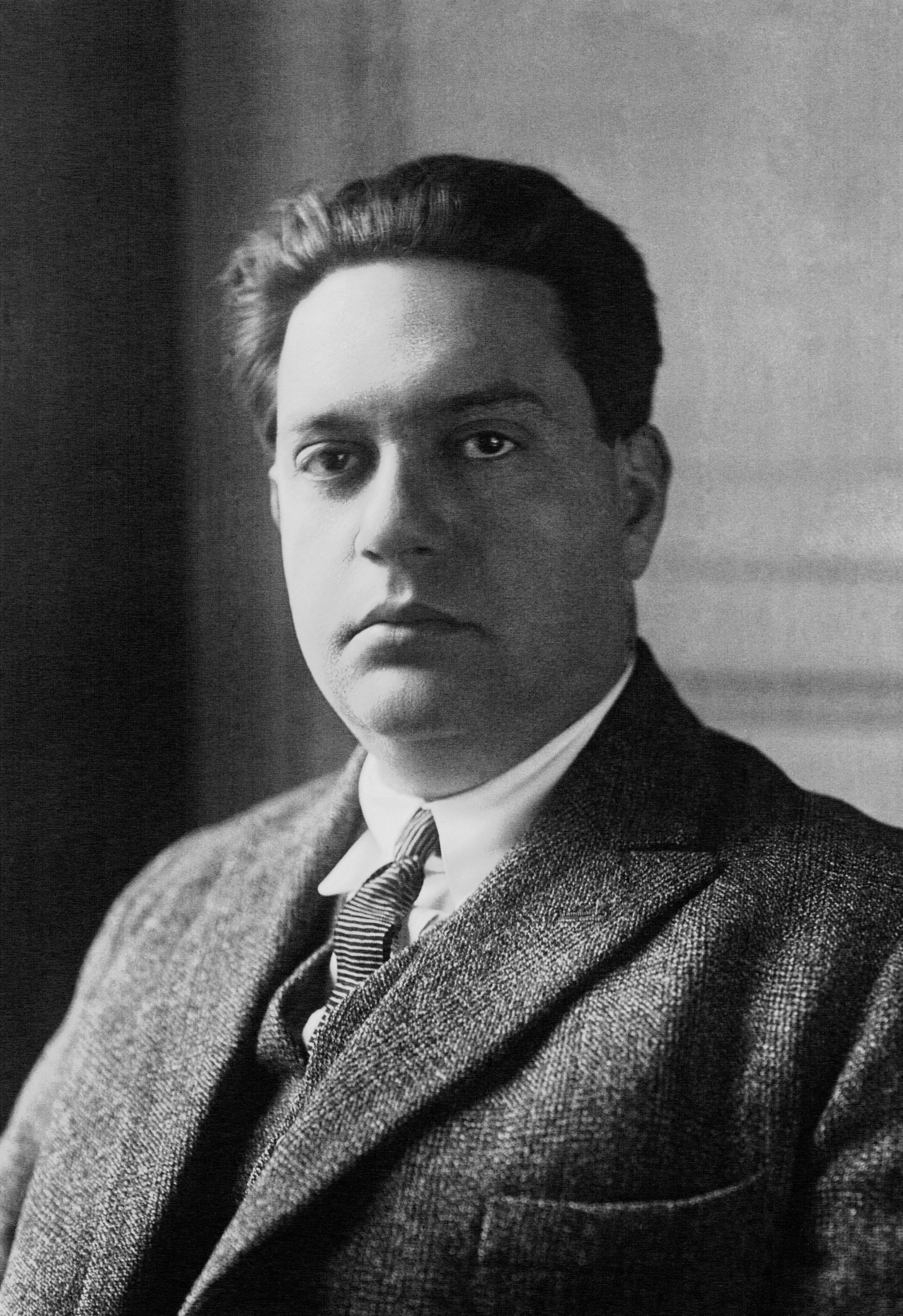
- Milhaud in 1923
- Librettist: Paul Claudel
- Language: French
- Based on: Life of Christopher Columbus
- Premiere: 5 May 1930; Berlin State Opera

Christophe Colomb (Christopher Columbus) is an opera in two parts by the French composer Darius Milhaud. The poet Paul Claudel wrote the libretto based on his own play about the life of Christopher Columbus, Le Livre de Christophe Colomb. The opera was first performed at the Staatsoper, Berlin, on 5 May 1930 in a German translation by Rudolph Stephan Hoffmann. Milhaud thoroughly revised the work and produced a second version around 1955. The opera is on a large scale and requires many resources for its staging. As in many of his other works, Milhaud employs polytonality in parts of the score.

== Roles ==
Roles, voice types, premiere cast
Role	Voice type	Premiere cast, 5 May 1930 Conductor: Erich Kleiber
Young Columbus	baritone	Theodor Scheidl
Old Columbus	bass	Emanuel List
Queen Isabella of Spain	soprano	Delia Reinhardt
The wife of Columbus	soprano	Margherita Perras
Majordomo	tenor	Fritz Soot
The King of Spain	bass	
Master of ceremonies	tenor	
Narrator	spoken role	

== Synopsis ==
The opera tells the life of Christopher Columbus in a series of episodes which avoid chronological order and are sometimes allegorical.

== Recording ==
Janine Micheau (Reine Isabelle), Claudine Collart (Duchesse Medina Sidonia), Robert Massard (Christophe Colomb), Xavier Depraz (Christophe Colomb II, Messenger, etc.), Jean Giraudeau (Majordome, Cuisinier, Valet, Sultan), Lucien Lovano (Roi d'Espagne, Commandant, Aubergiste etc.), Orchestre Radio Lyrique, Chœurs de la RTF, conducted by Manuel Rosenthal. Disques Montaigne CE 8750 (from the INA), released 1987; recorded at the Théâtre des Champs-Élysées on 31 May 1956.

(A 1954 recording "conducted by Pierre Boulez" is of the Claudel play, with different incidental music by Milhaud, and a cast including Jean-Pierre Granval, Jean Desailly, Jean-Louis Barrault, Pierre Bertin, and Madeleine Renaud).
