= White Paws =

1949 film

- Directed by: Jean Grémillon
- Written by: Jean Anouilh; Jean Bernard-Luc
- Produced by: Roger De Venloo
- Starring: Suzy Delair; Fernand Ledoux; Paul Bernard
- Cinematography: Philippe Agostini
- Edited by: Louisette Hautecoeur
- Music by: Elsa Barraine
- Production company: Majestic Films
- Distributed by: DisCina
- Release date: 13 April 1949
- Running time: 92 minutes
- Country: France
- Language: French

White Paws (French: Pattes blanches) is a 1949 French drama film directed by Jean Grémillon and starring Suzy Delair, Fernand Ledoux and Paul Bernard. The Paws of the title refer to the white spats wore by the protagonist, the aristocratic owner of an estate on the French coast.

It was shot at the Neuilly Studios in Paris and on location in Erquy in Brittany. The film's sets were designed by the art director Léon Barsacq. Grémillon had attempted to produce several film projects since the financial failure of The Woman Who Dared in 1944, but this was the first feature he had managed to make. Similar in plot and atmosphere to his wartime film Summer Light, this resulted in another commercial failure and Grémillon's eclipse as a leading French director by other filmmakers such as Henri Georges-Clouzot.

== Synopsis ==
In Brittany, inn owner Jock Le Guen brings his mistress Odette back to town with him, but she soon takes up with the aristocratic eccentric Julien de Keriadec, derisively known to the inhabitants as "White Paws". Their relationship ultimately ends tragically.

== Cast ==
- Suzy Delair as Odette Kerouan
- Fernand Ledoux as Jock Le Guen
- Paul Bernard as Julien de Keriadec- Pattes Blanches
- Arlette Thomas as Mimi la bossue
- Michel Bouquet as Maurice
- Geneviève Morel as Marguerite
- Paul Barge as Un invité
- Betty Daussmond as La tante de Julien
- Philippe Sergeol as Un invité
- Sylvie as La mère de Maurice
- Jean Debucourt as Le juge d'instruction

== Bibliography ==
- Williams, Alan. Republic of Images: A History of French Filmmaking. Harvard University Press, 1992.
