= Granval =

Granval is a surname. Notable people with the surname include:

- Charles Granval (1882–1943), French actor
- Jean-Pierre Granval (1923–1998), French actor
