= Alexis Roland-Manuel =

French composer and critic

Alexis Roland-Manuel (22 March 1891 – 1 November 1966) was a French composer and critic, remembered mainly for his criticism.

== Biography ==
He was born Roland Alexis Manuel Lévy in Paris, to a family of Belgian and Jewish origins. He studied composition under Vincent d'Indy and Albert Roussel. As a young man he befriended composer Erik Satie, who helped him to make numerous influential connections. In 1911, Satie introduced Roland-Manuel to Maurice Ravel, whose pupil, friend and biographer he soon became.

In 1947, he was appointed Professor of Aesthetics at the Conservatoire de Paris, where he remained until his retirement in 1961, making many contributions to musical theory and criticism, even assisting Igor Stravinsky by ghost-writing the theoretical work "The Poetics of Music". In addition to theoretical works, he wrote and composed various works for stage, especially comic operas, and screen, developing a partnership with director Jean Grémillon, for five of whose films he composed the scores.

Roland-Manuel's criticism included several monographs on the music of Ravel from the perspective of a respectful pupil and a lifetime friend. The titles include "Ravel", "Ravel et son oeuvre" and "Ravel et son oeuvre dramatique".

Arthur Honegger dedicated Pastorale d'été to Roland-Manuel.

He died in Paris in 1966.

== Selected works ==
=== Stage ===
- Isabelle et Pantalon (1922)
- Canarie (1927; for the children's ballet L'éventail de Jeanne, to which ten French composers each contributed a dance)
- Le Diable amoureux (1929), opera based on the novel The Devil in Love by Jacques Cazotte
- Canarie (1952: for the collaborative orchestral work La guirlande de Campra)
- Jeanne d'Arc (1955)

=== Film scores ===
- Little Lise (1930)
- The Dream (1931)
- Partir (Departure, 1931)
- Crainquebille (1934)
- King of the Camargue (1935)
- The Brighton Twins (1936)
- The Strange Monsieur Victor (1938)
- Remorques, (Stormy Waters, 1941)
- Summer Light (1943)
- Lucrèce (1943)
- Le Ciel est à vous (The Woman Who Dared, 1944)
