= Louisette Hautecoeur =

French film editor (1914–2004)

- Born: 23 May 1914; Sevran, France
- Died: 18 May 2004 (aged 89); Chaumont-en-Vexin, France
- Occupation: Film editor
- Years active: 1934–1976 (film)

Louisette Hautecoeur (French pronunciation: [lwizɛt otkɔœʁ]; 1914–2004) was a French film editor. Active from the 1930s to the 1970s, she worked on productions by directors such as René Clair, Jean Grémillon, André Berthomieu, Luis Buñuel, Georg Wilhelm Pabst and Marcel L'Herbier. She was married to fellow film editor Henri Taverna.

== Selected filmography ==
- The Last Billionaire (1934)
- Street of Shadows (1937)
- The Kiss of Fire (1937)
- The Shanghai Drama (1938)
- Girls in Distress (1939)
- The White Slave (1939)
- Miquette (1940)
- Serenade (1940)
- The Acrobat (1941)
- Romance of Paris (1941)
- Prince Charming (1942)
- The Murderer is Afraid at Night (1942)
- Bolero (1942)
- Summer Light (1943)
- The Woman Who Dared (1944)
- Farandole (1945)
- Happy Go Lucky (1946)
- Gringalet (1946)
- Man About Town (1947)
- White Paws (1949)
- King Pandora (1950)
- The Chocolate Girl (1950)
- Mademoiselle Josette, My Woman (1950)
- The Strange Madame X (1951)
- The King of Camelots (1951)
- Never Two Without Three (1951)
- The Long Teeth (1953)
- Wonderful Mentality (1953)
- The Father of the Girl (1953)
- The Love of a Woman (1953)
- Children of Love (1953)
- The Grand Maneuver (1955)
- Scandal in Montmartre (1955)
- Paris, Palace Hotel (1956)
- The Bride Is Much Too Beautiful (1956)
- Maid in Paris (1956)
- Gates of Paris (1957)
- A Kiss for a Killer (1957)
- And Your Sister? (1958)
- That Night (1958)
- Magnificent Sinner (1959)
- Les Scélérats (1960)
- All the Gold in the World (1961)
- Captain Fracasse (1961)
- Le Masque de fer (1962)
- Shéhérazade (1963)
- Diary of a Chambermaid (1964)
- Les amitiés particulières (1964)
- Gibraltar (1964)
- The Lace Wars (1965)
- Living It Up (1966)
- Belle de Jour (1967)
- The Milky Way (1969)
- The Dominici Affair (1973)
- Piaf (1974)
- Emilienne (1975)
- The Margin (1976)

== Bibliography ==
- Durgnat, Raymond. Luis Bunuel. University of California Press, 1977.
- McGerr, Celia. René Clair. Twayne Publishers, 1980.
