= The Strange Madame X =

- Theatrical poster
- Directed by: Jean Grémillon
- Written by: Marcelle Maurette; Pierre Laroche (dialogue); Albert Valentin (adaptation)
- Produced by: Claude Dolbert; André Collignon (co-producer)
- Starring: Michèle Morgan; Henri Vidal
- Cinematography: Louis Page
- Edited by: Louisette Hautecoeur
- Music by: Vincent Scotto
- Production companies: Codo Cinéma; S. G. G. C.
- Release date: 22 June 1951
- Running time: 91 minutes
- Country: France
- Language: French

The Strange Madame X (French: L'Étrange Madame X) is a 1951 French drama film directed by Jean Grémillon. The screenplay was written by Marcelle Maurette, Pierre Laroche (dialogue) and Albert Valentin (adaptation). It stars Michèle Morgan and Henri Vidal. Morgan's gowns were designed by Pierre Balmain.

== Synopsis ==
It tells the story of a housemaid who marries an aristocrat, then falls in love with a low-born laborer and becomes pregnant by him.

== Cast ==
- Michèle Morgan as Irene
- Henri Vidal as Etienne
- Maurice Escande as Jacques
- Arlette Thomas as Jeanette
- Louise Conte as Angèle
- Robert Vattier as Moissac
- Paul Barge as uncle Léon
- Roland Alexandre as Marcel
