= Stormy Waters (1941 film) =

1941 French film directed by Jean Grémillon

Remorques Stormy Waters
- Theatrical poster
- Directed by: Jean Grémillon
- Written by: Jacques Prévert (scenario & dialogue); André Cayatte (adaptation)
- Based on: Troubled Waters by Roger Vercel
- Starring: Jean Gabin; Madeleine Renaud; Michèle Morgan
- Cinematography: Armand Thirard
- Edited by: Yvonne Martin
- Music by: Alexis Roland-Manuel
- Production companies: MAIC; Sedis
- Distributed by: Films Sonores Tobis
- Release dates: 27 November 1941 (France); 15 June 1946 (U.S.)
- Running time: 81 minutes
- Country: France
- Language: French

Remorques (literally 'towlines'; English title: Stormy Waters) is a 1941 French drama film directed by Jean Grémillon. The screenplay was written by Jacques Prévert (scenario and dialogue) and André Cayatte (adaptation), based on the novel Troubled Waters by Roger Vercel. The film stars Jean Gabin, Madeleine Renaud and Michèle Morgan.

It was shot at the Billancourt Studios in Paris and on location around Finistère in Brittany including at Brest. The film's sets were designed by the art director Alexandre Trauner. It was distributed in France by the Paris subsidiary of the German Tobis Film company. After the Second World War it was given an American release by MGM.

== Plot ==
André is the dedicated captain of a tugboat, his mission being to salvage vessels in distress before competitors do, but his wife Yvonne is weary of being a sea-widow and wants him to spend more time with her. Called out to save a cargo ship in a violent storm, he takes on board most of the crew, including the captain's wife, and is towing the vessel towards harbour when its captain cuts the towline to avoid having to pay for rescue. André returns the crew, except for the wife who refuses to go back, and fells the crooked captain with a punch.

The wife takes a room in a hotel, where André calls to make sure she is all right: her name is Catherine and currents flow between the two. As Yvonne becomes more demanding, the prospect of visiting Catherine becomes more appealing and soon André is neglecting both wife and job. The crisis comes when it is revealed that Yvonne's obsessive behaviour is because she is mortally ill. Catherine hastily packs and leaves town, while Yvonne dies in André's arms. Having lost both lover and spouse, all André has left is his boat as he departs in a storm to answer another SOS call.

== Cast ==
- Jean Gabin as Captain André Laurent
- Madeleine Renaud as Yvonne Laurent
- Michèle Morgan as Catherine
- Charles Blavette as Gabriel Tanguy
- Jean Marchat as Marc, captain of the 'Mirva'
- Nane Germon as Renée Tanguy
- Jean Dasté as Le radio
- René Bergeron as Georges
- Henri Poupon as Le docteur Maulette
- Anne Laurens as Marie Poubennec
- Marcel Pérès as Le Meur
- Marcel Duhamel as Pierre Poubennec
- Henri Pons as Roger
- Sinoël as L'armateur
- Fernand Ledouxas Kerlo, the boatswain

Jean Gabin as André Laurent is a strong and effective captain because of his confidence portrayed to the audience. Madeleine Renaud as Yvonne, his wife, is stoic about Andre's devotion to his job rather than to their marriage. Michèle Morgan, as Catherine, is desire personified because she is opposite to Yvonne's character, she embodies all the traits Yvonne rejectsand “appears to fear nothing”. Catherine exists between the worlds of both men and women as “a creature of the sea” aligning herself in a workforce that is not open to women. In Yvonne and Andre's relationship there exists a conflict between “work … and love”. When Catherine and André meet on a beach, this scene represents “liberty without limits” a contrast to the entrapment of Yvonne's apartment and the rigors of Andre's position as captain.

== Style ==
Remorques has developed a reputation as a film that defies simple categorization. "[Remorques] is a work that dons many different genre guises and then quickly abandons them." The film grazes multiple genres without settling neatly into any one, be it drama, melodrama, tragedy, action-adventure, poetic realist film, war-time film, histoire d'amour fou, or simply romance. This evasion of precise classification may well have its basis in Grémillon himself, having formerly been trained as a musician before his discovery of filmmaking. Akin to other filmmakers given to experimentation and the avant-garde, Grémillon "was inclined to liken cinema to poetry and music, rather than to other narrative art forms." Rather than to view filmmaking as possessing clear guidelines, Grémillon ostensibly chose to view the production of his work as manifestly an exercise in creativity, setting out "rather to mix naturalistic aspects, including location photography and realistic storylines, with careful visual and dramatic stylisation."

Despite Grémillon's musical background, however, it is said that Prévert resented the director's decision to impose "a rather religious music" upon the poet's text appearing on-screen at the end of the film.

Grémillion uses camera angles to show the hard work performed on salvage ships, and he does this by filming multiple scenes of the ship at work. He utilizes different parts of the boat like the engine room, the deck, and the kitchen to create a “narrative emphasis on the importance of work”. He expands on this through the quality of food he has the actors eat in the kitchen scene having them eat “loaves of peasant bread” to portray the everyday life of the crew on a salvage ship.

== Personnel ==
The creative powers behind Remorques were not secured from the beginning. Only upon the insistence of lead actor Jean Gabin was the nationally beloved and celebrated poet Jacques Prévert recruited for the film's scriptwriting, who would in turn replace the previous attempts of Charles Spaak and then André Cayette. Prévert's unique creative efforts found fortuitous compatibility with Grémillon's vision for the film's realization while Gabin himself was "the biggest box office draw in French Cinema at the time and had given [Grémillon] his first commercial success with [1937's] Gueule d'amour."

Gabin's celebrity, as well as his singular proficiency in bringing to life the sort of male character typical of a Grémillon film, found a harmonious match with up-and-coming co-lead Michèle Morgan. Aside from the vocational competence shared by each, the actors' on-screen chemistry evidently found some basis within their personal, off-screen lives. When it had become known to each that the other had been cast for their respective roles, Gabin had offered to meet Morgan privately before the film's shooting had begun. Morgan herself recalled: "We flirted like lovers: our eyes never lost contact, our hands grazed without daring to really touch. Our laughter was forced and embarrassed, the silences dense. Every word was full of undertones."

== Release ==
The release date of Remorques had been pushed back to the Second World War. It was released in United States on June 15, 1946, five years after the initial French release.

Although the film could stand confidently upon the capabilities and public recognition of its cast, the release of Remorques unhappily coincided with the then recent invasion and occupation of the Third Reich. Once in power, the Nazis had demanded that the film be withdrawn from theaters.

In the end, however, the film would win its deserved acclaim and would secure "Grémillon's place as one of France's leading filmmakers during its darkest years."
