= Roger Vercel =

French writer (1894–1957)

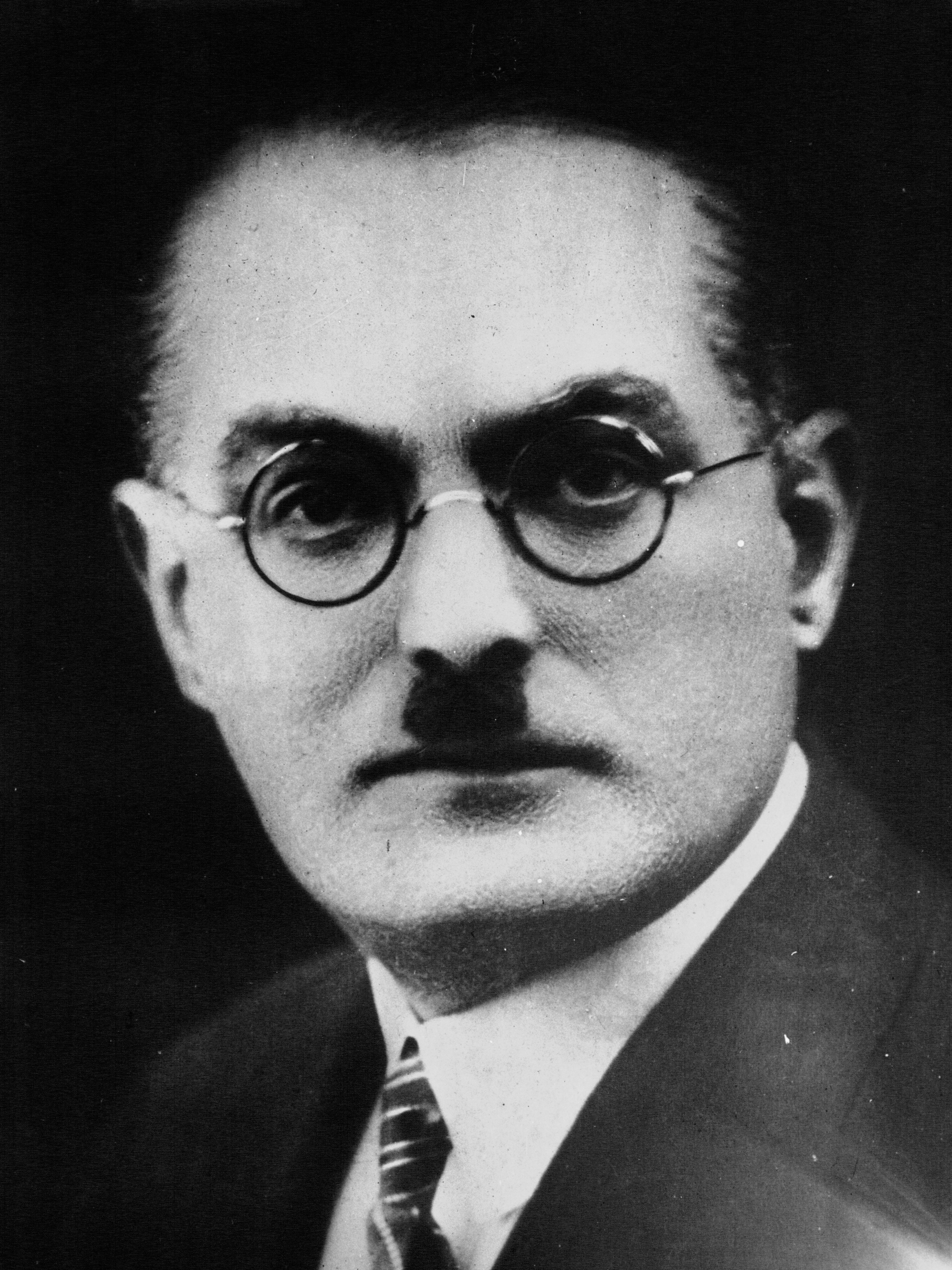
- Vercel in 1934
- Born: Roger Cretin; 8 January 1894; Le Mans, Pays de la Loire, France
- Died: 26 February 1957 (aged 63); Dinan, Brittany, France
- Occupation: Writer
- Writing career
- Notable awards: Prix Goncourt (1934)

Roger Vercel (French pronunciation: [ʁɔʒe vɛʁsɛl]; born Roger Cretin; 8 January 1894, in Le Mans – 26 February 1957, in Dinan) was a French writer.

== Biography ==
Vercel was fascinated by the sea and marine life. Although he virtually never went to sea, most of his novels featured a maritime setting.

World War I interrupted his studies of letters. Early in the war his poor eyesight left him a stretcher-bearer on the battlefields of northern and eastern France. Because of a shortage of army officers, he returned to Saint-Cyr. He ended the war on the eastern front, and was discharged a year after the Armistice.

He returned to Dinan, where in 1921 he was appointed professor at the College of Letters. He earned a doctorate in letters in 1927, with a thesis entitled: "The images in the work of Corneille". The Académie française awarded it the Saintour prize of literary history. Dinan extinguished it in 1957.

His war memories inspired some of his earlier books: Our Father Trajan, Captain Conan, Lena, but the maritime world makes up the heart of his work. Off Eden earned him the Prix Femina from the France-America Committee in 1932. He received the Prix Goncourt in 1934 for Captain Conan.

Several of his works were brought to the screen:

- Stormy Waters, 1941 (dir. Jean Gremillion, with Jean Gabin, Michèle Morgan, Madeleine Renaud, Fernand Ledoux)
- Du Guesclin, 1949 (dir. Bernard de Latour, with Gisele Casadesus, Louis de Funès Gérard Oury)
- The murky waters, 1949 (dir. Henri Calef, with Jean Vilar, Ginette Leclerc, André Valmy, Mouloudji) is based on the new blades Deaf.
- The great bulwarks, 1954 (dir. Jacques Pinoteau Courcel Nicole Marie Mansard, Jean-Pierre Mocky)
- Captain Conan, 1996 (dir. Bertrand Tavernier, Philippe Torreton, Samuel Le Bihan, Bernard Le Coq)

== Sources ==
- Simone Vercel, "Roger Vercel, my father." in L'Humanite, September 19, 1996.
- Erwann Letilleul Roger Vercel, maritime writer, Chasse-tidal No. 142, p. 24-35, April 2001.
- Jacques Georgel, "Roger Vercel" biography. Apogee Publishing, 2006, 189 p.

== Works ==
=== Studies ===
- Les images dans l'œuvre de Corneille, thèse pour le doctorat ès lettres, A. Olivier, 1927.
- Lexique comparé des métaphores dans le théâtre de Corneille et de Racine, thèse complémentaire pour le doctorat ès-lettres, A. Olivier, 1927.
- Un programme d'éducation générale in Disciplines d'action, Vichy, Paris, Commissariat général à l'éducation générale et aux sports, 1942.

=== Novels ===
- Notre père Trajan, Albin Michel, 1930.
- En Dérive, Albin Michel, 1931.
- Au Large de l'Eden, Albin Michel, 1932.
- Le maître du rêve, Albin Michel, 1933.
- Capitaine Conan, Albin Michel, 1934. (Film: 1996)
- Remorques, Albin Michel, 1935. Les Bibliophiles de France, 1957 (Film: 1941)
- Léna, Albin Michel, 1936.
- Sous le pied de l'archange, Albin Michel, 1937.
- Jean Villemeur, Albin Michel, 1939.
- La Hourie, Albin Michel, 1942.
- Aurore boréale, Albin Michel, 1947.
- La caravane de Pâques, Albin Michel, 1948. (illustrations par Frédéric Back)
- La fosse aux vents :
  - I.- Ceux de la Galatée, Albin Michel, 1949.
  - II.- La peau du Diable, Albin Michel, 1950.
  - II.- Atalante, Albin Michel, 1951.
- Visage perdu, Albin Michel, 1953.
- L'Île des revenants, Albin Michel, 1954.
- Été indien, Albin Michel, 1956.

== Biographies ==
- Du Guesclin, Albin Michel, 1932; Éditions Arc-en-ciel, 1944 (illustrations by Frédéric Back); Editions de la Nouvelle France, 1944 (illustration by Jacques Lechantre).
- Le Bienheureux Charles de Blois, Albin Michel, 1942.
- Nos vaillants capitaines, Impr. de Curial-Archereau, 1945.
