= Troubled Waters (Vercel novel) =

1935 novel by Roger Vercel

- Author: Roger Vercel
- Original title: Remorques
- Language: French
- Publisher: éditions Albin Michel
- Publication date: 1935
- Publication place: France
- English publication date: 1937
- Pages: 252

Troubled Waters (French: Remorques, lit. 'Tug-boats') is a novel by the French writer Roger Vercel, published in 1935 through éditions Albin Michel. It has also been published in English as Salvage. It follows life on a deep sea fishing trawler and the emotional struggle of its captain, who worships his unfaithful wife.

The book was adapted into the film Stormy Waters, directed by Jean Grémillon and released in 1941. The film stars Jean Gabin and Michèle Morgan and is considered a major work within the poetic realism movement. In 1957, Les Bibliophiles de France published Troubled Waters in an edition illustrated with colour lithographs by René Genis.
