= Captain Conan (novel) =

1934 novel by Roger Vercel

- Title page for Captain Conan (1935)
- Author: Roger Vercel
- Original title: Capitaine Conan
- Language: French
- Publisher: éditions Albin Michel
- Publication date: 1934
- Publication place: France
- English publication date: 1940
- Pages: 255

Captain Conan (French: Capitaine Conan) is a novel by the French writer Roger Vercel, published in 1934 through éditions Albin Michel. It follows a French captain as he leads his men in the Balkans during World War I and portrays the effects the war has on his character. It was inspired by Vercel's personal experiences from the war.

The book was awarded the 1934 Prix Goncourt. It was adapted into the film Captain Conan, directed by Bertrand Tavernier and released in 1996.
