= Dainah the Mulatto =

1932 film

- Directed by: Jean Grémillon
- Written by: Pierre Daye; Charles Spaak
- Starring: Charles Vanel; Habib Benglia; Gaston Dubosc
- Cinematography: Louis Page; Georges Périnal
- Production company: Gaumont-Franco Film-Aubert
- Distributed by: Gaumont-Franco Film-Aubert
- Release date: 19 August 1932
- Running time: 51 minutes
- Country: France
- Language: French

Dainah the Mulatto (French: Daïnah la métisse) is a 1932 French drama film directed by Jean Grémillon and starring Charles Vanel, Habib Benglia and Gaston Dubosc. Location shooting took place around Nice and Corsica. The film's sets were designed by the art director Jean Lafitte. The original length was of 90 minutes, but it was cut down by the distribution company Gaumont to a shorter 51 minute version for release. This is the only version that survives in film archives.

== Cast ==
- Charles Vanel as Le mécanicien Michaux
- Habib Benglia as Le mari
- Gaston Dubosc as Le commandant
- Lucien Guérard as Le docteur
- Laurence Clavius as Dainah Smith
- Gabrielle Fontan as Berthe
- Maryanne as Alice

== Bibliography ==
- Crisp, Colin. Genre, Myth and Convention in the French Cinema, 1929-1939. Indiana University Press, 2002.
- Goble, Alan. The Complete Index to Literary Sources in Film. Walter de Gruyter, 1999.
- Neupert, Richard. French Film History, 1895–1946. University of Wisconsin Pres, 2022.
- Rège, Philippe. Encyclopedia of French Film Directors, Volume 1. Scarecrow Press, 2009.
