= Madeleine Robinson =

French actress

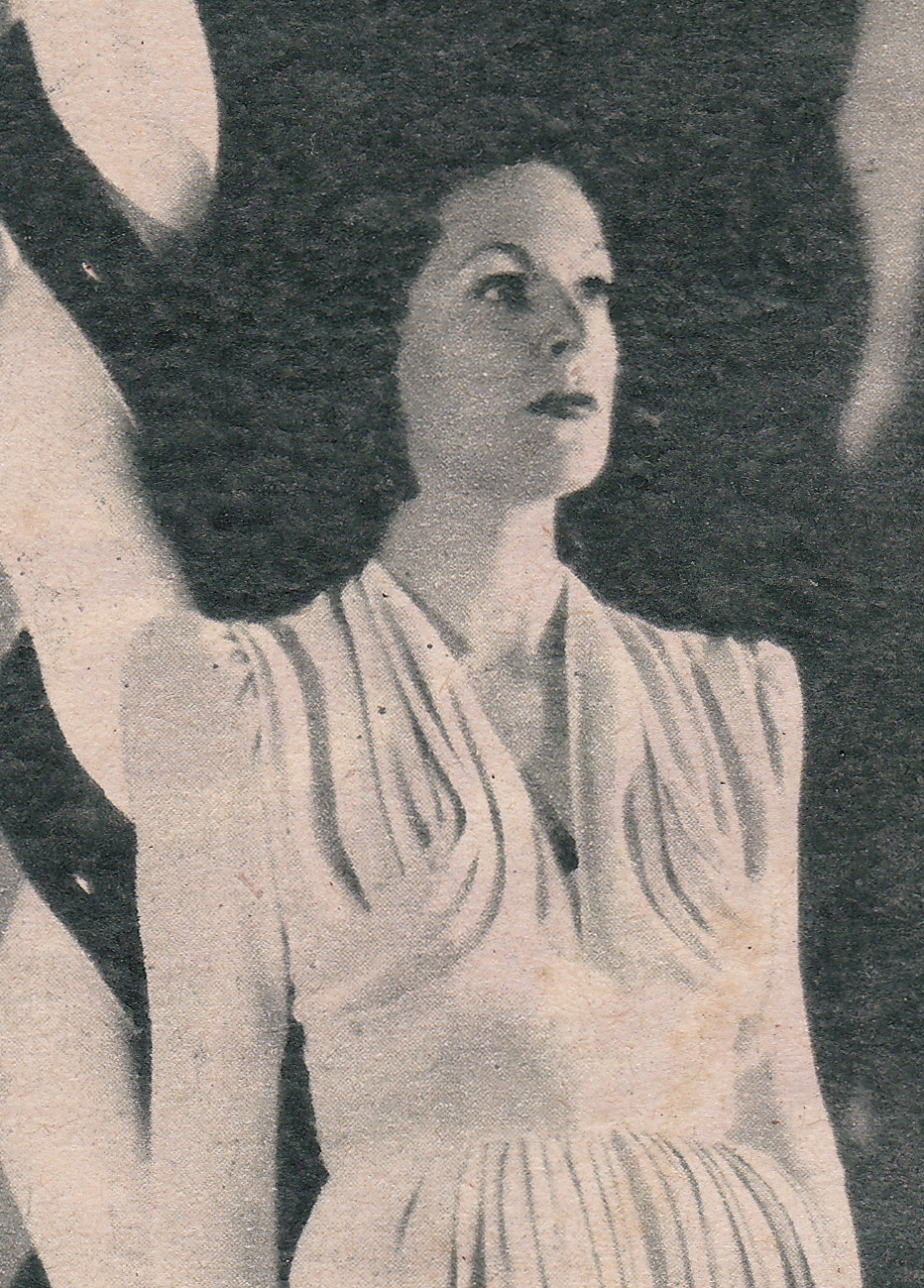
- Born: 5 November 1917; Paris, Ile-de-France, France
- Died: 1 August 2004 (aged 86); Lausanne, Vaud, Switzerland
- Other name: Madeleine Svoboda
- Occupation: Actress
- Years active: 1935–1995 (film & TV)

Madeleine Robinson (born Madeleine Svoboda; 5 November 1917 – 1 August 2004) was a French actress. She was born to a French mother and Czech father near Paris. She was orphaned at the age of 14, and worked to support herself and her two younger brothers, but enjoyed watching plays. She then studied under Charles Dullin. Her first lead role was in Forty Little Mothers (1936). During the Occupation of France, she had a prominent role in Love Story and Summer Light (both 1943), and The Bellman (1945). Because she had acted during the Occupation, Robinson found it difficult to get work afterwards, but again came to prominence in Une si jolie petite plage (1949). Madeleine Robinson won the Volpi Cup for Best Actress in 1959 for her role in À double tour. In 2001, she was awarded a Molière d'honneur for her contribution to the field.

== Selected filmography ==
- Tartarin of Tarascon (1934)
- Madame Angot's Daughter (1935)
- Forty Little Mothers (1936)
- The Assault (1936)
- A Man to Kill (1937)
- Storm Over Asia (1938)
- Captain Benoit (1938)
- The City of Lights (1938)
- The Innocent (1938)
- The Marvelous Night (1940)
- Promise to a Stranger (1942)
- The Crossroads (1942)
- Summer Light (1943)
- Love Story (1943)
- The Bellman (1945)
- The Royalists (1947)
- The Bouquinquant Brothers (1947)
- The Great Maguet (1947)
- The Fugitive (1947)
- The Cavalier of Croix-Mort (1948)
- The Story of Dr. Louise (1949)
- Such a Pretty Little Beach (1949)
- Between Eleven and Midnight (1949)
- The Barton Mystery (1949)
- Tuesday's Guest (1950)
- God Needs Men (1950)
- Savage Triangle (1951)
- The Man in My Life (1952)
- Alone in the World (1952)
- Their Last Night (1953)
- On Trial (1954)
- Mannequins of Paris (1956)
- Passionate Summer (1956)
- The She-Wolves (1957)
- À double tour (Web of Passion) (1959)
- Day by Day, Desperately (1961)
- Dark Journey (1961)
- The Trial (1962) - Mrs. Grubach
- The Gentleman from Epsom (1962)
- The Mad Heart (1970)
- Seven Days in January (1979)
- The Teddy Bear (1994)
