= Forty Little Mothers (1936 film) =

- Directed by: Léonide Moguy
- Written by: André Cerf; Jean Guitton; Daniel Maya; Léonide Moguy; Charles Spaak
- Produced by: Ayres d'Aguiar
- Starring: Lucien Baroux; Gabrielle Dorziat; Pauline Carton
- Cinematography: Philippe Agostini; Michel Kelber; Louis Page
- Music by: Michel Michelet
- Production company: Gray-Film
- Distributed by: Delta-Films
- Release date: 6 November 1936 (France)
- Running time: 98 minutes
- Country: France
- Language: French

Forty Little Mothers (French: Le mioche) is a 1936 French comedy film directed by Léonide Moguy and starring Lucien Baroux, Gabrielle Dorziat and Pauline Carton. The 1940 Hollywood film Forty Little Mothers was based on the same story.

== Cast ==
- Lucien Baroux as Prosper Martin
- Gabrielle Dorziat as Mme Granval, La directrice
- Pauline Carton as Mlle Clotilde
- Milly Mathis as Gervaise
- Madeleine Robinson as Denise Mériel, la mère
- Jane Pierson as La gérante
- Georges Vitray as Dalbret
- Marcel Maupi as Marius Rabut
- Jean Périer as L'aumônier
- Pierre Labry as Bourgeon, le père
- Gilbert Gil as Robert Bourgeon, le fils
- Marcel Carpentier as Le cuisinier
- René Bergeron as Le garagiste
- André Siméon as Le pochard
- Pierre Juvenet as Le coadjuteur
- Philippe as Le mioche
- Nane Germon as Simone
- Anne Doria as Valentine
- Wally Carveno as Geneviève
- Claire Gérard as Le lingère
- Elisabeth Aumont as Une élève
- Jenny Carol as Une élève
- Léonce Corne as Le brocanteur
- Janine Darcey
- Aline Debray
- Foun-Sen as Une élève
- May Francine
- Gary Garland
- Liliane Gauthier
- Paulette Houry
- René Lacourt
- Michèle Morgan as Une élève
- Jacqueline Pacaud as Une élève
- Roger Rosen

== See also ==
- Forty Little Mothers (1940)
- Cento piccole mamme (1952)

== Bibliography ==
- Jonathan Driskell. The French Screen Goddess: Film Stardom and the Modern Woman in 1930s France. I.B.Tauris, 2015.
