= The Bellman (film) =

1945 film

- Directed by: Christian-Jaque
- Written by: Claude Boncompain (novel); Christian-Jaque; Jacques Prévert
- Produced by: Michel Manégat
- Starring: Fernand Ledoux; Renée Faure; Madeleine Robinson
- Cinematography: Louis Page
- Edited by: Jacques Desagneaux
- Music by: Henri Verdun
- Production company: Moulin D'Or
- Distributed by: DisCina
- Release date: 5 December 1945
- Running time: 100 minutes
- Country: France
- Language: French

The Bellman (French: Sortilèges) is a 1945 French drama horror film directed by Christian-Jaque and starring Fernand Ledoux, Renée Faure and Madeleine Robinson. The film portrays a village haunted by superstition and fears. Although released after the Liberation, the film was shot during the German Occupation. The film's sets were designed by the art director Robert Gys. The film was popular and recorded admissions in France of 2,552,165.

== Cast ==
- Fernand Ledoux as Fabret, le 'lièvre'
- Renée Faure as Catherine Fabret
- Madeleine Robinson as Marthe
- Roger Pigaut as Pierre
- Georges Tourreil as Le brigadier
- Léonce Corne as Le cordonnier
- Marcel Pérès as Le villageois
- Jacques Butin
- Léon Larive
- Pierre Labry as L'idiot du village
- Sinoël as La grand-mère
- Lucien Coëdel as Jean-Baptiste, le campanier
- Michel Piccoli as Un villageois
