= The Bride Is Much Too Beautiful =

- Directed by: Pierre Gaspard-Huit
- Written by: Philippe Agostini; Juliette Saint-Giniez
- Based on: The Bride Is Much Too Beautiful by Odette Joyeux
- Produced by: Christine Gouze-Rénal
- Starring: Brigitte Bardot; Micheline Presle; Louis Jourdan
- Cinematography: Louis Page
- Edited by: Louisette Hautecoeur
- Music by: Norbert Glanzberg
- Production companies: Generale de Films; Société Nouvelle Pathé Cinéma
- Distributed by: Pathé Consortium Cinéma
- Release date: 26 October 1956
- Running time: 95 minutes
- Country: France
- Language: French
- Box office: 2,366,799 admissions (France)

The Bride Is Much Too Beautiful (French: La mariée est trop belle) is a 1956 French comedy film directed by Pierre Gaspard-Huit and starring Brigitte Bardot, Micheline Presle and Louis Jourdan. It is also known by the alternative title of Her Bridal Night.

The film is based on the 1954 novel of the same title by Odette Joyeux. It was shot at the Billancourt Studios in Paris and on location in Saint-Émilion in Southern France. The sets were designed by art director Jean d'Eaubonne, with costumes by Pierre Balmain.

== Plot ==
A rural girl discovered by a Paris magazine becomes an urban supermodel.

== Cast ==
- Brigitte Bardot as Catherine Ravaud, aka Chouchou
- Micheline Presle as Judith Aurigault
- Louis Jourdan as Michel Bellanger
- Marcel Amont as Toni
- Jean-François Calvé as Patrice
- Roger Dumas as Marc
- Madeleine Lambert as Agnès
- Marcelle Arnold as Mme Victoire
- Colette Régis as Yvonne
- Roger Tréville as M. Designy
- Annie Roudier as La cuisinière
- Nicole Gueden as Juliette
- Dominique Boschero

== Reception ==
Variety wrote "Possessed of a pouting pigeon personality, she [Bardot] does not seem up to dishing out either the beauteous firebrands or the wavering virgins. She appears to have been pushed too fast for her real thespic talents."

== Bibliography ==
- Phillips, Alastair & Vincendeau, Ginette. Journeys of Desire: European Actors in Hollywood. British Film Institute, 2006.
