= Storm over Asia =

Storm over Asia may refer to:

- Storm over Asia (1928 film)
- Storm over Asia (1938 film)
