= Arlette Thomas =

French actress

- Born: 5 November 1927; Paris, France
- Died: 13 May 2015 (aged 87); Antony, Hauts-de-Seine, France
- Occupation: Actress
- Years active: 1946–2008
- Children: Pierre Jolivet

Arlette Thomas (5 November 1927 – 13 May 2015) was a French actress. She also worked frequently as a voice actress in dubbing foreign films for their French release.

She was awarded the Prix Suzanne Bianchetti in 1949. She is the mother of the actor Pierre Jolivet.

== Selected filmography ==
- Land Without Stars (1946)
- White Paws (1949)
- Le paradis des pilotes perdus (1949)
- The Strange Madame X (1951)
- Huis clos (1954)
- The Grand Maneuver (1955)
- Girl and the River (1958)
- Naked Hearts (1966)
- A Time for Dying (1969)
- Céleste (1970)
- Les Misérables (1982)

== Bibliography ==
- Bessy, Maurice & Chirat, Raymond. Histoire du cinéma français: encyclopédie des films, 1940–1950. Pygmalion, 1986
- Rège, Philippe. Encyclopedia of French Film Directors, Volume 1. Scarecrow Press, 2009.
