= The Strange Monsieur Victor =

1938 French film directed by Jean Grémillon

- Directed by: Jean Grémillon
- Written by: Marcel Achard; Charles Spaak; Albert Valentin
- Produced by: Raoul Ploquin
- Starring: Raimu; Pierre Blanchar; Madeleine Renaud
- Cinematography: Werner Krien
- Music by: Roland Manuel
- Production companies: UFA; L'Alliance Cinématographique Européenne
- Distributed by: L'Alliance Cinématographique Européenne
- Release date: 4 May 1938
- Running time: 103 minutes
- Countries: France; Germany
- Language: French

The Strange Monsieur Victor (French: L'Étrange Monsieur Victor) is a 1938 French-German drama film directed by Jean Grémillon and starring Raimu, Pierre Blanchar and Madeleine Renaud. It was shot at the Tempelhof Studios in Berlin. The film's sets were designed by the art directors Otto Hunte and Willy Schiller. The film was made by major German studio Universum Film AG in collaboration with its French subsidiary. It was the thirteenth most popular film at the French box office in 1938.

== Synopsis ==
Victor Agardanne, a respectable businessman in Toulon, secretly works as a fence receiving stolen goods. When a man threatens to reveal his clandestine activities, he murders the blackmailer. He allows an innocent man to be arrested for the crime and be sent to a South American penal colony. When the wronged man escapes from prison, he heads back to Toulon to seek revenge against whoever really committed the murder.

== Cast ==
- Raimu as Victor Agardanne
- Pierre Blanchar as Bastien Robineau
- Madeleine Renaud as Magdeleine Agardanne
- Marcelle Géniat as La mère de Victor
- Andrex as Robert Cerani
- Georges Flamant as Amédée
- Charles Blavette as Le premier inspecteur
- Marcel Maupi as Rémi
- Charblay as M. Noir
- Armand Larcher as L'inspecteur #2
- Viviane Romance as Adrienne Robineau
- Roger Peter as Un enfant
- Daniel Kahya as Un enfant
- Odette Roger as Mme Marie
- Édouard Delmont as Paroli

== Bibliography ==
- Driskell, Jonathan. The French Screen Goddess: Film Stardom and the Modern Woman in 1930s France. I.B.Tauris, 2015.
