= Web of Passion =

- Directed by: Claude Chabrol
- Written by: Claude Chabrol; Paul Gégauff
- Based on: The Key to Nicholas Street by Stanley Ellin
- Produced by: Robert and Raymond Hakim
- Starring: Antonella Lualdi; Jean-Paul Belmondo; Bernadette Lafont; Madeleine Robinson
- Cinematography: Henri Decaë
- Edited by: Jacques Gaillard
- Music by: Paul Misraki
- Distributed by: Compagnie Commerciale Française Cinématographique (CCFC)
- Release date: 1959
- Running time: 110 minutes
- Country: France
- Language: French
- Box office: 1,446,479 admissions (France)

Web of Passion (also released as Leda, original French title: À double tour) is a 1959 French/Italian psychological thriller film directed by Claude Chabrol and based on the novel The Key to Nicholas Street by American writer Stanley Ellin. It was Chabrol's first film in colour and his first thriller, which would be his genre of choice for the rest of his career. The film had a total of 1,445,587 admissions in France.

== Plot ==
In a country mansion in Provence, Henri and Thérèse live in grand style with their two grown-up children, Richard and Élisabeth. A small villa next door is taken by a beautiful young Italian artist called Leda, who turned up with an ebullient Hungarian friend Laszlo. Leda has started a romance with Henri while Laszlo has got engaged to Élisabeth, to the dismay of her mother. Seeing Leda's pain at being in love with a married man who still shares his wife's bed, Laszlo urges Henri to leave home and make a new life with Leda. The son Richard, seeing his mother's pain and shame if she loses her husband, goes secretly to the villa and kills Leda. After a peremptory investigation, the police arrest the innocent milkman. Working out that the person with motive and opportunity was Richard, Laszlo waterboards him in a pond and extracts a confession for the ears of Richard's family only. Thérèse wants the secret kept in the family but Élisabeth says he must confess to the police and save the milkman. After asking Henri if he can forgive him, which the father cannot, Richard goes off to the police.

== Cast ==
- Madeleine Robinson as Thérèse Marcoux
- Antonella Lualdi as Leda
- Jean-Paul Belmondo as Laszlo Kovacs
- Jacques Dacqmine as Henri Marcoux
- Jeanne Valérie as Élisabeth Marcoux
- Bernadette Lafont as Julie, the maid
- André Jocelyn as Richard Marcoux
- Mario David as Roger, the milkman
- László Szabó as Laszlo's friend

== Production ==
Produced by Robert and Raymond Hakim, it was Chabrol's first big-budget color film. It was shot by cinematographer Henri Decaë on location in Aix-en-Provence.

== Reception ==
Madeleine Robinson won the Volpi Cup for Best Actress in 1959 for her role in this film. With 1,445,587 admissions in France, it was Chabrol's third most popular film in his career.

The Film Quarterly reviewer wrote: "Chabrol here shows himself as a sort of cross between Hitchcock... and Minnelli", and praised the film's "flamboyant, glorious color" and "astonishing tours de force camerawork." Time Out commented: "Chabrol's third film, greeted at the time as a Hitchcock pastiche,... has gained considerably in stature," and added that "the climactic murder of the mistress... reveals the first glimpses of the Fritz Lang influence later to flower in Chabrol's work." Roy Armes was more critical, saying that "Chabrol's lack of feeling for his characters and love for overacting becomes evident in his handling of the minor characters, and the love scenes which should be moving are simply cinematic clichés."
