= The Love of a Woman =

1953 film

- Directed by: Jean Grémillon
- Written by: René Wheeler; René Fallet; Jean Grémillon
- Produced by: Mario Gabrielli; Pierre Gérin
- Starring: Micheline Presle; Massimo Girotti; Gaby Morlay
- Cinematography: Louis Page
- Edited by: Louisette Hautecoeur; Marguerite Renoir
- Music by: Elsa Barraine; Henri Dutilleux
- Production companies: Les Productions Cinématographiques; Film Costellazione Produzione
- Distributed by: Ciné Sélection
- Release date: 13 December 1953
- Running time: 104 minutes
- Countries: France; Italy
- Language: French

The Love of a Woman (French: L'amour d'une femme, Italian: L'amore di una donna) is a 1953 French-Italian drama film directed by Jean Grémillon and starring Micheline Presle, Massimo Girotti and Gaby Morlay. It was Grémillon's final feature film as director, although he made a handful of documentaries and short films.

The film's sets were designed by the art director Robert Clavel with costumes by Pierre Balmain. It was shot at the Billancourt Studios in Paris and on location on the Île d'Ouessant off Finistère.

== Synopsis ==
A young female doctor settles in a village on an island off the coast of Brittany, where she engages in a relationship with an engineer working on a project on the island.

== Main cast ==
- Micheline Presle as Dr. Marie Prieur
- Massimo Girotti as André Lorenzi
- Gaby Morlay as Germaine Leblanc
- Paolo Stoppa as Le curé
- Marc Cassot as Marcel
- Marius David as Lulu, l'adjoint d'André
- Yvette Etiévant as Fernande de Malgorny
- Roland Lesaffre as Yves
- Robert Naly as Dr. Morel
- Madeleine Geoffroy as Isabelle Morel

== Bibliography ==
- Dayna Oscherwitz & MaryEllen Higgins. The A to Z of French Cinema. Scarecrow Press, 2009.
