= Captain Conan =

- Film poster
- Directed by: Bertrand Tavernier
- Written by: Jean Cosmos; Bertrand Tavernier
- Based on: Captain Conan by Roger Vercel
- Produced by: Yvon Crenn
- Starring: Philippe Torreton; Samuel Le Bihan; Catherine Rich (in French)
- Cinematography: Alain Choquart
- Edited by: Luce Grunenwaldt; Laure Blancherie; Khadicha Bariha-Simsolo
- Music by: Oswald d'Andréa
- Distributed by: BAC Films
- Release date: 16 October 1996
- Running time: 130 minutes
- Country: France
- Language: French
- Budget: $10 million
- Box office: $4.4 million

Captain Conan (original title: Capitaine Conan) is a 1996 French drama film directed by Bertrand Tavernier. It is based on the 1934 Prix Goncourt-winning novel Captain Conan (Fr. Capitaine Conan) by Roger Vercel.

== Plot ==
In the French infantry on the Macedonian front during the First World War, Conan, an officer of the elite Chasseurs Alpins, is the charismatic leader of a special squad, many from military prisons, who raid enemy lines at night taking no prisoners. Despising career soldiers, his only friend is the young academic, Norbert.

When the Armistice with Bulgaria is signed in September 1918, his unit is sent to Bucharest, capital of France's ally Romania, as part of the Allied intervention in the Russian Civil War. Neither fighting nor demobilised, idleness and low morale leads to criminality and indiscipline and courts-martials begin. After being appointed a defence attorney, despite his protests and having no legal expertise, and performing well, Norbert is coerced into filling to place of the departing prosecutor to protect Conan, who is facing multiple charges, from the danger of unjust and severe punishment.

In an armed robbery of a crowded nightclub, some of Conan's men, disguised, seize the takings, in the process badly injuring a female singer and fatally wounding the female cashier. With the help of the Romanian police and a French prostitute, Norbert finds and prosecutes the culprits but ensures they receive light sentences.

A widow arrives from France looking for her son, whom she finds awaiting trial for desertion. After listening to her story, Norbert thinks that the boy may be blameless and that his officer is seeking to have him shot. Conan, who hates the officer, agrees and takes Norbert to the old front line where the boy was lost in action. Both become convinced of his innocence but he is convicted nonetheless.

Despite the soldiers wishing to return home, the French move up to the Dniester as part of the Allied intervention in the Russian Civil War and come under attack from the Red Army. During the action, Conan empties the stockade of mutineers and drives off the attackers.

In a sombre epilogue, years later back in France, Norbert visits Conan to find him no longer the dashing hero but the terminally ill owner of a small haberdashers, his profession before the war, disappointed with his neighbours and wife.

== Cast ==
- Philippe Torreton: Conan
- Samuel Le Bihan: Norbert
- Bernard Le Coq: Lieutenant de Scève
- Catherine Rich : Madeleine Erlane
- François Berléand: Commandant Bouvier
- Claude Rich: General Pitard de Lauzier
- Cécile Vassort: Georgette
- André Falcon: Colonel Voirin
- Claude Brosset: Father Dubreuil
- Crina Muresan: Ilyana
- Cécile Vassort: Georgette
- François Levantal: Forgeol
- Pierre Val: Jean Erlane
- Roger Knobelspiess: Major Cuypene
- Frédéric Pierrot: Conductor
- Jean-Claude Calon: officier Loisy
- Laurent Schilling: Beuillard
- Jean-Yves Roan: Rouzic
- Philippe Héliès: Grenais
- Tonio Descanvelle: Caboulet
- Eric Savin: Gunsmith
- Olivier Loustau: Mahut
- Jean-Marie Juan: Lethore
- Laurent Bateau: Perrin, soldier
- Eric Dufay: Lieutenant Fideli
- Philippe Frécon: Ménard, the cook
- Patrick Delage: Messinge, the waiter
- Patrick Brossard: Riquiou
- Yvon Crenn: Floch
- Christophe Odent: Cabanel
- Franck Jazédé: Havrecourt
- Dominique Compagnon: Morel
- Frédéric Diefenthal: sergeant gare Bucarest
- Luminiţa Anghel: singer in a bar
- Radu Duda: Insp. Stefanesco

== Reception ==
The film has two out of three fresh reviews on Rotten Tomatoes, even though there are more reviews listed.

Janet Maslin, of The New York Times, said that Mr. Torreton powerfully embodies the film's central questions of what a fighter becomes without combat and where the values inherent in savage battle may lead. Ken Fox, of TV Guide, said beautiful as it is brutal and that it is one of the best war films of recent years. Alex Albanese, of Box Office, said that the film is finely wrought—as hard, precise and heartbreaking as its title character.

== Awards and nominations ==
Bertrand Tavernier won the César Award for Best Director and Phillippe Torreton won the César Award for Best Actor. The film was also nominated for six other César Awards including Best Film, Best Original Screenplay or Adaptation and Most Promising Actor. The film was nominated for Film Presented at the Telluride Film Festival.

== DVD release ==
The DVD is in French with English subtitles, widescreen, and has a 2.0-channel PCM audio mix. The only special feature on the DVD is Un Film Sur Bertrand Tavernier, a fifty-four-minute documentary about the making of the film. The release date of the DVD was December 19, 2000.
