= Forty Little Mothers =

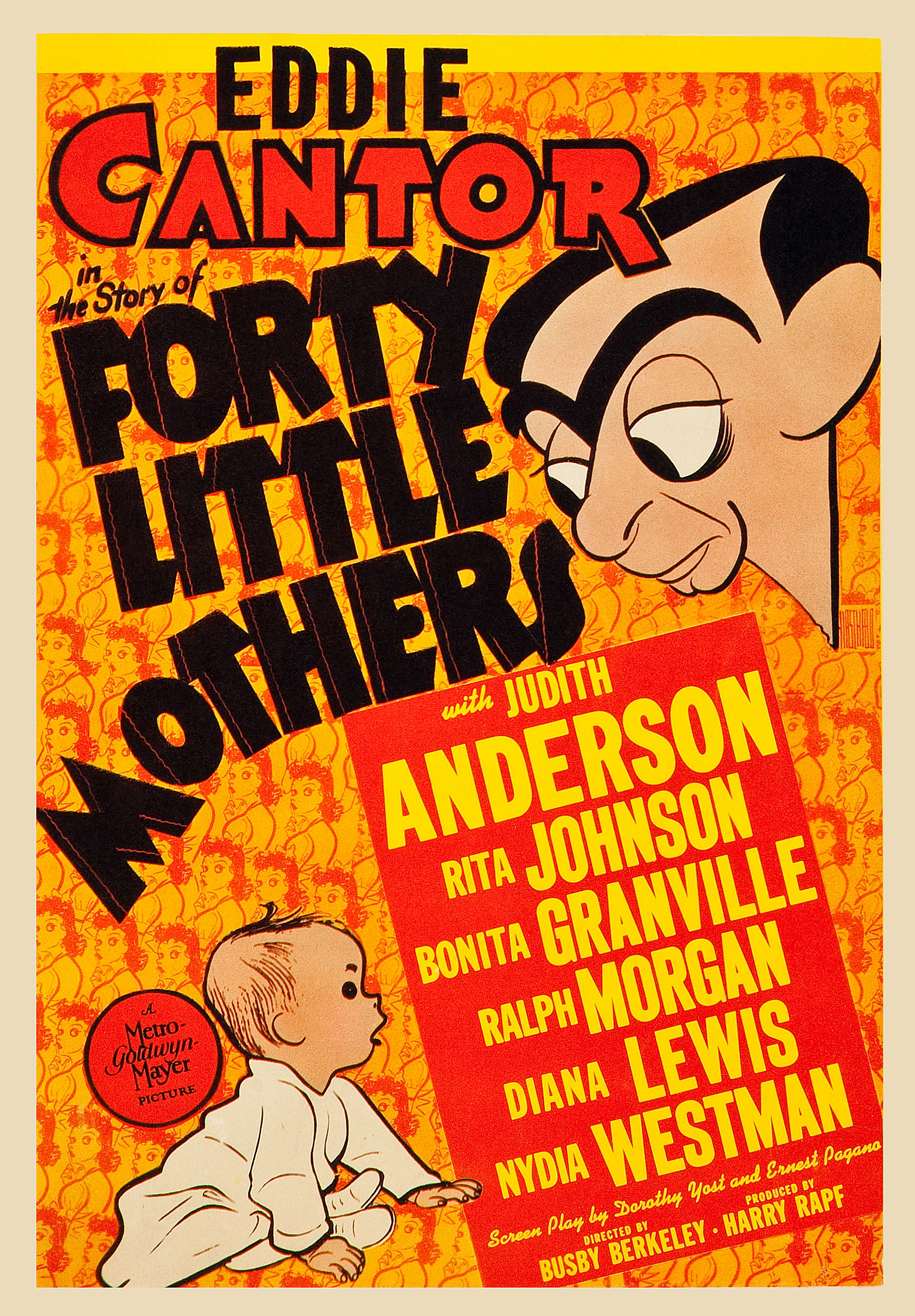
- Poster
- Directed by: Busby Berkeley
- Screenplay by: Dorothy Yost; Ernest Pagano
- Based on: Le mioche 1936 film by Jean Guitton
- Produced by: Harry Rapf
- Starring: Eddie Cantor; Judith Anderson; Ralph Morgan
- Cinematography: Charles Lawton Jr.
- Edited by: Ben Lewis
- Music by: Georgie Stoll
- Production company: Metro-Goldwyn-Mayer
- Distributed by: Loew's Inc.
- Release date: April 26, 1940
- Running time: 90 minutes
- Country: United States
- Language: English

Forty Little Mothers is a 1940 American comedy-drama film directed by Busby Berkeley and starring Eddie Cantor.

== Plot ==
Out-of-work professor Gilbert Jordan Thompson stops a suicidal stranger named Marian Edwards from jumping off a pier and helps her get a job so she can support herself. Then, he finds an abandoned baby with a note asking someone to give him a good home. When he cannot find anyone to claim the baby, Gilbert "adopts" him so he will not end up in an orphanage.

Meanwhile, the baby's mother, Marian, arrives a few minutes too late to reclaim her son, and frantically tries to find him, not knowing that the man who saved her life is taking care of her child.

Soon Gilbert gets a teaching job with live-in quarters at an all-girls school that does not allow teachers to have families. This forces him to hide the baby, whom he calls "Chum". The students harass the professor and try one scheme after another to get him fired because they are angry at him for replacing the heartthrob professor they loved.

When the girls discover Chum and hear his story, they become his "forty little mothers" and fight for the privilege of taking care of him, also deciding that the professor is not so bad after all.

After staff members see the girls making baby clothes and assume the worst, they alert the strict, no-nonsense headmistress, who finds Chum and fires Professor Thompson for breaking the rules. The girls stage a mutiny and barricade themselves in their dormitory, vowing that they will not come out until the professor gets his job back. The professor talks sense into them and prepares to leave, not knowing that Marian has shown up and reclaimed her son.

Because she thinks Professor Thompson is the husband who deserted Marian and her baby, the headmistress tries to turn his students against him by bringing the mother and child to the classroom to tell them about it. However, the professor comes in before she can tell them the story, and Marian and he recognize each other.

Marian explains that she had to give up her baby after being deserted by her husband, and Thompson explains that he took the baby in. He says the baby had the "best care in the world and the love of forty little mothers." Marian thanks the girls for taking such good care of her baby. The professor walks outside and Marian follows so he can say goodbye to Chum. As the professor is leaving the campus, the remorseful headmistress, with all the students in tow, gives him his job back.

== Cast ==
- Eddie Cantor as Gilbert Jordan Thompson
- Judith Anderson as Madame Granville
- Ralph Morgan as Judge Joseph M. Williams
- Rita Johnson as Marian Edwards
- Bonita Granville as Doris
- Diana Lewis as Marcia
- Nydia Westman as Mademoiselle Cliché
- Margaret Early as Eleanor
- Martha O'Driscoll as Janette
- Barbara Quintanilla (billed as Baby Quintanilla) as Chum

The "Granville Girls" students seen here include many of MGM's starlets of the time, including Connie Keane (who later became a star as Veronica Lake) and the deadpan singer Virginia O'Brien. In addition, many established character players are uncredited, including Joe Yule, Adrienne D'Ambricourt, Esther Dale, Selmer Jackson, and Virginia Sale.

== Production ==
Forty Little Mothers was a personal project for Eddie Cantor. He and his wife had seen a French film about a downtrodden schoolteacher, Forty Little Mothers (Le Mioche), and he prevailed upon MGM to buy the American rights for a remake, starring Cantor. In an effective change of pace from his usual bouncing, songs-and-jokes performances, the now restrained Cantor had several dramatic scenes and sang only one song. Production was set for November 1939 but was postponed at least twice before going before the cameras in January 1940.

The director was Busby Berkeley, a master at staging elaborate dance pageants. There were none to be had in the new Cantor picture, but Berkeley surprised critics with his disciplined direction of the dramatic vignettes: "To Busby Berkeley goes unstinted praise for the sympathetic direction which makes the picture so appealing," said Hollywood Spectator. "A swell job of direction," agreed The Exhibitor.

== Reception ==
Critical response was unanimously positive. "Forty Little Mothers is precisely the kind of picture the world needs now, one as far away in mood from the depressing international occurrences as it is possible to get. It is a healthy, clean, joyous picture," wrote Hollywood Spectator; "[Cantor] plays the foster-father role with feeling and sympathy which make his performance perhaps the most ingratiating of his career." The Movies commented: "Eddie plays Professor Gil with broad emphasis, rising loyally to the gag lines, shifting rapidly from burlesque to pathos and back." Motion Picture Reviews, reviewing films in terms of suitability for youngsters, remarked, "Eddie Cantor plays a straight role simply and convincingly." The Exhibitor wrote: "This is Eddie Cantor's first screen appearance in a dramatic role and he scores in a big way with a human interest story. Cantor is the name for the marquee, but Baby Quintanilla will be best remembered by the patrons when they are homeward bound, having received full value in entertainment from every angle. Audience reaction was excellent." Showmen's Trade Review summed it up: "One of the most appealing, heartwarming pictures ever produced, everything about it is excellent -- there's a new Eddie Cantor playing his first dramatic role and playing it exceptionally well. It is surefire entertainment and should score a hit at the box office."

The Hollywood preview went well, as William R. Weaver of Motion Picture Herald reported in detail: "Audience reaction to the smiles, frowns, gurgling, and gesturing of the baby was audibly favorable. Laughter evoked by lines and business pertaining to the feigned amours of the college girls, and the unfeigned preoccupation of the feminine faculty members with these, was louder but less unanimous. A lot of whistling and humming of the song sung by Cantor in the picture was being done by the departing audience."

Yet somehow the film failed to find an audience. Exhibitor response was mixed: some liked the new Cantor but noticed that fans of the traditional Cantor stayed away. "As good a picture as you will show in a long time but still the public was afraid of it." "Kept the audience laughing from start to finish and pleased one hundred percent. The baby is almost too good to be true. A few more like this one and I might keep out of the bread line." "This was an entirely different Cantor picture. That fellow really has the job in hand." One report was more pointed: "Fairly good picture but Eddie Cantor does not mean a thing anymore." Disappointed by the film's less than stellar performance, Cantor himself came to regard Forty Little Mothers as a flop. He would not return to motion pictures for three years, and he never returned to serious characterizations on the screen.

== See also ==
- Forty Little Mothers (1936)
- Cento piccole mamme (1952)
