= Alain Choquart =

French cinematographer

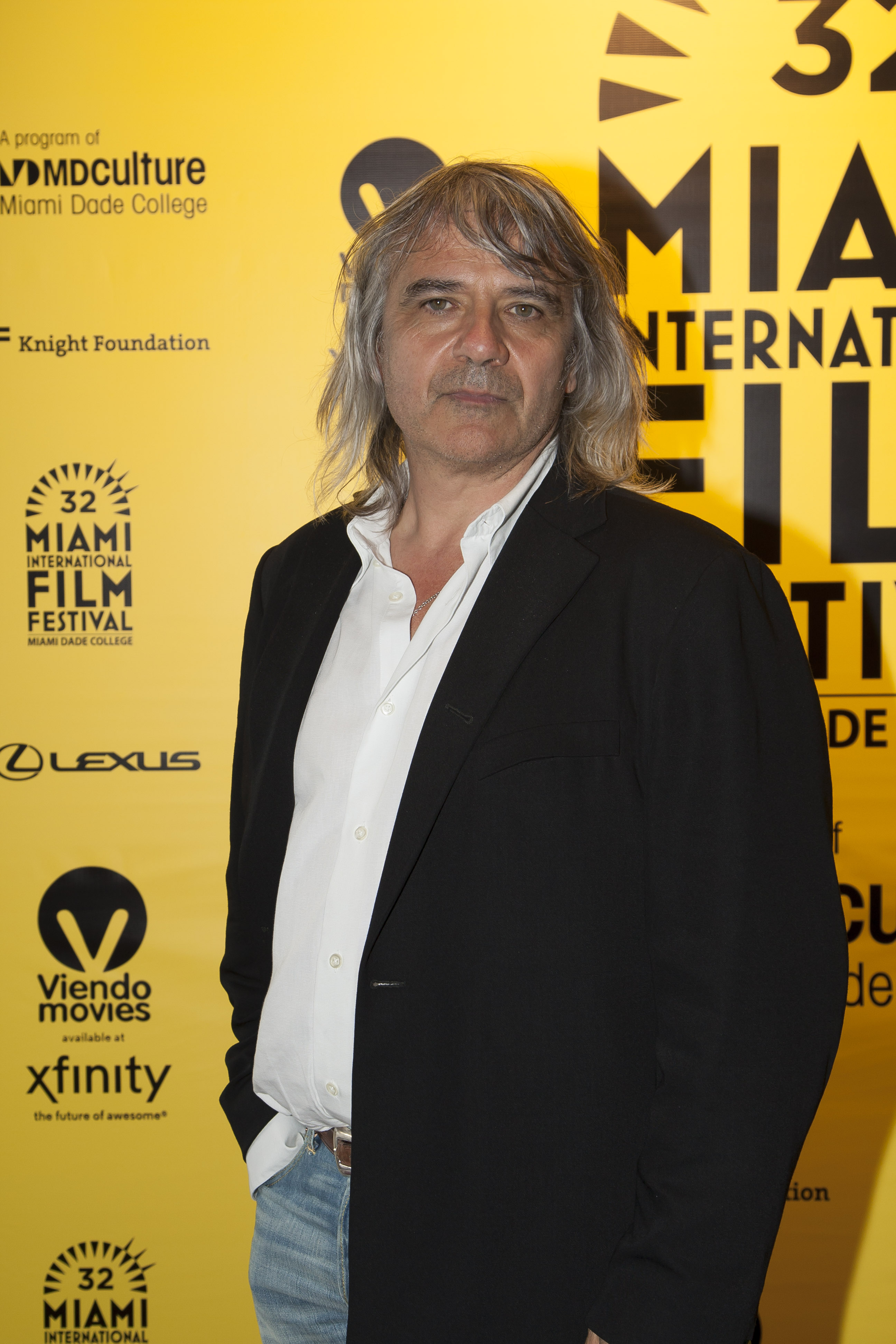
- Born: September 26, 1960 (age 64); Sablé-sur-Sarthe, France
- Occupation(s): Cinematographer, director, screenwriter, author

Alain Choquart (born September 26, 1960, in Sablé-sur-Sarthe) is a French cinematographer who later became a director and screenwriter, and then an author. He is particularly known for his collaboration with Bertrand Tavernier, with whom he has worked on ten films.

== Filmography ==
=== Cinematographer ===
- 1992: L.627 by Bertrand Tavernier
- 1995: The Bait by Bertrand Tavernier
- 1995: The Three Brothers by Didier Bourdon and Bernard Campan
- 1996: Captain Conan by Bertrand Tavernier
- 1999: It All Starts Today by Bertrand Tavernier
- 2000: Boesman & Lena by John Berry
- 2002: Safe Conduct by Bertrand Tavernier
- 2004: Holy Lola by Bertrand Tavernier

=== As director ===
- 2005: La vie devant nous (TV series)
- 2006: Même âge, même adresse (TV series)
- 2008: R.I.S, police scientifique (TV series)
- 2010: Vidocq (TV series)
- 2015: Lady Grey

== Publications ==
- Cette terre que je croyais mienne, Les Arènes, October 20, 2022 ISBN 1-037-50598-0
