= Little Lise =

1930 film directed by Jean Grémillon

- Directed by: Jean Grémillon
- Written by: Charles Spaak
- Produced by: Bernard Natan; Emile Natan
- Starring: Nadia Sibirskaïa
- Cinematography: Jean Bachelet
- Music by: Roland Manuel
- Production company: Pathé-Natan
- Distributed by: Pathé-Natan
- Release date: 5 December 1930
- Running time: 73 minutes
- Country: France
- Language: French

Little Lise (French: La Petite Lise) is a 1930 French drama film directed by Jean Grémillon and starring Nadia Sibirskaïa. It was shot at the Joinville Studios of Pathé in Paris. The film's sets were designed by Guy de Gastyne.

It was Grémillon's first sound film, and also one of the first for the production company Pathé-Natan. The film was the first of multiple collaborations between Grémillon and composer Alexis Roland-Manuel.

The film has been described as an early piece of poetic realism.

== Synopsis ==
Little Lise (1930)

The film begins with the release of Victor Berthier from prison. He immediately goes to visit his daughter Lise, who is overjoyed to see him. Ashamed to tell him that she is working as a prostitute, Lise tells her father that she is a typist. Victor gives her a watch bearing his initials before going to look for work. Soon after, Lise's lover André arrives and urges her to sell the watch to a loan shark. A fight ensues between André and the loan shark, resulting in Lise accidentally killing the man. Lise and her lover leave the apartment. She returns home to find her father, who tells her that he has found a job. Later Victor sees a receipt from the loan shark on the floor and realizes that she is in need of money. He goes to retrieve the watch from the loan shark, instead finding the man's dead body. Victor returns home with the watch and accuses André of killing the loan shark. Lise tells her father that she was the one who killed the loan shark. Wanting his daughter to be happy and free, Victor decides to tell the police that he is the murderer.

== Cast ==
- Pierre Alcover as Victor Berthier
- Joe Alex as Le danseur noir
- Alex Bernard as Un client de Lise
- Julien Bertheau as André
- Raymond Cordy as Un joueur de billiard
- Lucien Hector as Un bagnard
- Alexandre Mihalesco as L'usurier
- Pierre Piérade as M. Bazet
- Nadia Sibirskaïa as Lise Berthier
- Ernest Léardée as Le violoniste dans la rue

== Bibliography ==
- Andrews, Dudley. Mists of Regret: Culture and Sensibility in Classic French Film. Princeton University Press, 1995.
