= Habib Benglia =

French actor (1895–1960)

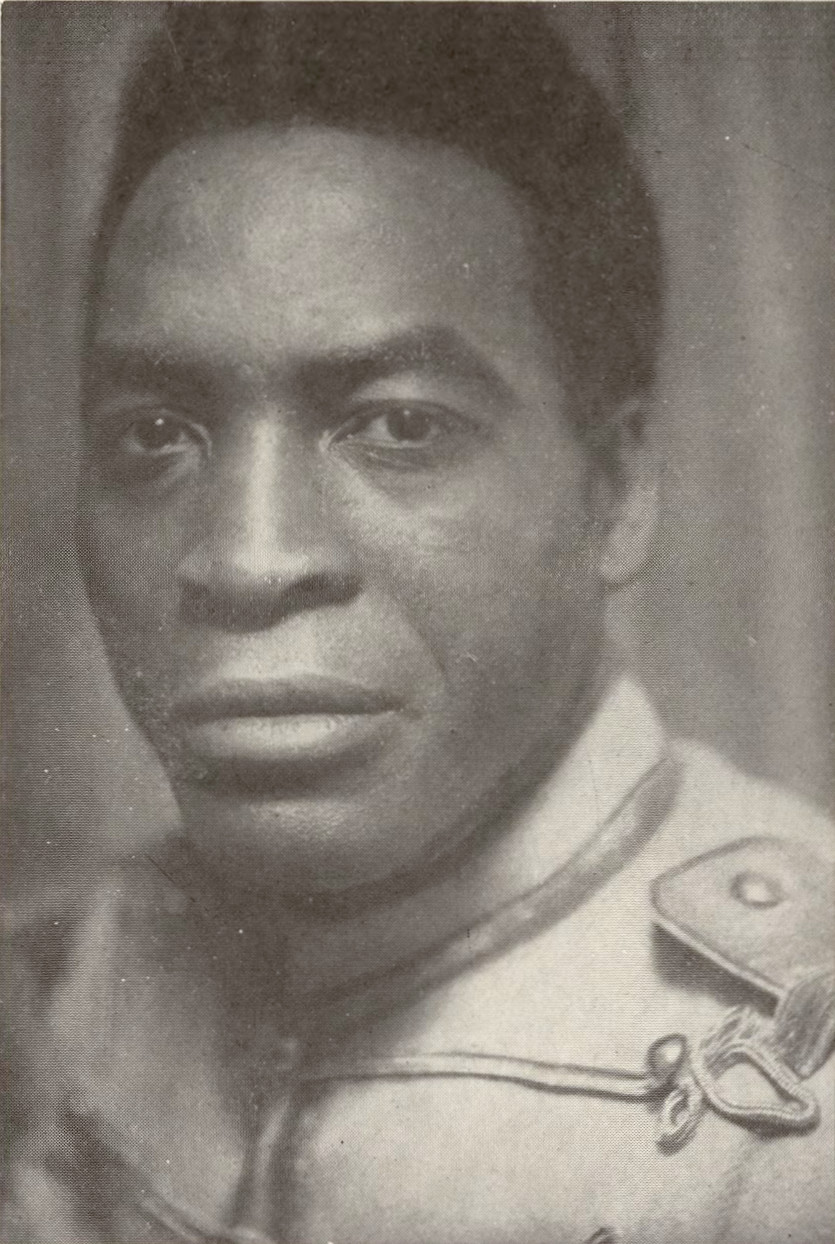
- Born: 25 August 1895; Oran, French Algeria
- Died: 2 December 1960 (aged 65); Paris, France
- Occupation: Actor
- Years active: 1925–1960 (film)

Habib Benglia (25 August 1895 – 2 December 1960) was a French film actor. He was the first French-African actor to land major roles in both cinema (he acted in Renoir and Pujol movies among others) and theater (performing in over 100 plays), having his first successes in the 1920s.

== Early life ==
Habib Benglia was born on 25 August 1895 in Oran, Algeria to caravaniers parents originally from French Sudan (now Mali), he spent his childhood in Timbuktu. He travelled with his parents to mainland France in 1912 to deliver camels to the Jardin d'Acclimatation, where the colonial exhibition ‘Les Nègres’ was being held in 1912.

== Career ==
Benglia decided to stay in France and began his career in 1913, in both theatre and film, after meeting the actress and dancer Régine Flory, who introduced him to Cora Laparcerie, director of the Théâtre de la Renaissance.

Mobilised during the First World War, Benglia then joined Firmin Gémier's theatre company, which became the Théâtre National de l'Odéon under Gaston Baty in 1922.

Benglia was the first Black actor to play roles in the classical repertoire. He also played the title role in The Emperor Jones at the Odéon in 1923, at the age of 27. However, he explored other aspects of his art: in dance, revues and vaudeville. Theatre in all its forms remained his passion for over 36 years. It was primarily through theatre that he played a major role in Parisian cultural life between the wars. He became good friends with Aïcha Goblet, a Black artists' model and performer who was one of the figure of the Années folles in 1920s Montparnasse, Paris.

Benglia was also interested in the cinema, but French cinema offered him few good roles. He was most often seen in small roles in second-rate films, but also in a few colonial propaganda films, sometimes in ridiculously exotic roles. There were a few exceptions: Benglia starred in Daïnah la métisse, had interesting passages in Sola or Les Mystères de Paris, then made a brief appearance in Les Enfants du Paradis, a film on which he only worked for two days (5 and 6 December 1943). In all, he appeared in around sixty films. It was the range of his deep voice that was most remarkable and that determined the roles he was given.

He was married and had two children. Habib Benglia died on 2 December 1960 at l'hôpital Hôtel-Dieu in Paris.

== Commemoration ==
On 25 August 2023, Habib Benglia's 128th birthday was marked with a Google Doodle in his honour.

== Selected filmography ==
- My Priest Among the Rich (1925)
- Yasmina (1927)
- Alone (1931)
- You Will Be a Duchess (1932)
- Dainah the Mulatto (1932)
- The Mysteries of Paris (1935)
- Nitchevo (1936)
- The Secrets of the Red Sea (1937)
- Storm Over Asia (1938)
- Les Enfants du Paradis (1945)
- The Renegade (1948)
- The Dancer of Marrakesh (1949)
- Tom Toms of Mayumba (1955)
- A Missionary (1955)
- The Roots of Heaven (1958)
- Certains l'aiment froide (1960)
- Candide (1960)

== Bibliography ==
- Sylvie Chalaye, Du Noir au Nègre, l'image du Noir au théâtre (1550–1960), Paris, L'Harmattan, 1998.
- Nathalie Coutelet, «Habib Benglia: quand le Noir entre en scène», Présence africaine, n° 170, 2004, pp. 89–209.
- Nathalie Coutelet, «Habib Benglia et le cinéma colonial», Cahiers d'études africaines, n° 191, 2008, pp. 531–548.
- Jean-Philippe Dedieu, «Les comédiens. Universalisme ou protectionnisme artistique?», La parole immigrée. Les migrants africains dans l'espace public en France (1960–1995) , Paris, Klincksieck, 2012, pp. 149–187.
- Miliani Hadj, «Diasporas musiciennes et migrations maghrébines en situation coloniale», Volume, n° 2, 2015, pp. 155–169.
- Susan Hayward, French Costume Drama of the 1950s: Fashioning Politics in Film, Chicago, Chicago Press University, 2010.
- Lucien Lemoine, «Maître, prenez la parole», Présence Africaine, n° 3, 1995, pp. 35–47.
