= The Grand Maneuver =

1955 film directed by René Clair

Les Grandes Manœuvres The Grand Maneuver
- Film poster
- Directed by: René Clair
- Written by: René Clair (screenplay and dialogue); Jérôme Géronimi (adaptation); Jean Marsan (adaptation)
- Produced by: René Clair; André Daven
- Starring: Michèle Morgan; Gérard Philipe
- Cinematography: Robert Lefebvre
- Edited by: Louisette Hautecoeur; Denise Natot
- Music by: Georges Van Parys
- Production companies: Filmsonor; Rizzoli Film; S.E.C.A. Cinétel
- Distributed by: Cinédis
- Release date: 26 October 1955
- Running time: 107 minutes
- Country: France
- Language: French
- Box office: 5,302,963 admissions (France)

The Grand Maneuver (French: Les Grandes Manœuvres) is a 1955 French comedy-drama romance film written and directed by René Clair, and starring Michèle Morgan and Gérard Philipe. It was released in the United Kingdom and Ireland as Summer Manoeuvres, and in the United States under the title The Grand Maneuver. It is a romantic comedy-drama set in a French provincial town just before World War I, and it was René Clair's first film to be made in colour.

== Plot ==
Armand de la Verne, a lieutenant in the French cavalry and a notorious seducer, undertakes a bet that he will "obtain the favours" of a woman selected secretly by lot, before his company departs for its summer manoeuvres in a month's time. His target turns out to be Marie-Louise Rivière, a Parisian divorcée who runs a milliner's shop, and who is also being courted by the serious and respectable Victor Duverger. Marie Louise's growing attraction towards Armand is tempered by her discoveries about his reputation, while Armand's calculated strategy becomes undermined by his genuine emotions. A subplot follows the parallel but simpler courtship of Armand's friend and fellow officer Félix and Lucie, the young daughter of a photographer.

== Cast ==
- Michèle Morgan as Marie-Louise Rivière
- Gérard Philipe as Le lieutenant Armand de la Verne
- Jean Desailly as Victor Duverger
- Pierre Dux as Le Colonel
- Jacques Fabbri as L'ordonnance d'Armand
- Jacques François as Rodolphe
- Yves Robert as Le lieutenant Félix Leroy
- Brigitte Bardot as Lucie
- Lise Delamare as Juliette Duverger
- Jacqueline Maillan as Jeanne Duverger, une soeur de Victor
- Magali Noël as Thérèse, la chanteuse (as Magali Noel)
- Simone Valère as Gisèle Monnet (as Simone Valere)
- Catherine Anouilh as Alice, la fille du préfet
- Madeleine Barbulée as La dame au chapeau jaune
- Dany Carrel as Rose-Mousse
- Gabrielle Fontan as Mélanie, la bonne des Duverger
- Viviane Gosset as La colonelle
- Judith Magre as Emilienne
- Arlette Thomas as Amélie, la bonne de Marie-Louise
- Raymond Cordy as Le photographe
- Olivier Hussenot as Le préfet
- Jacques Jouanneau as L'ordonnance de Félix
- Jacques Morel as Monsieur Monnet
- Palau as Arthur (as Pierre Palau)
- Claude Rich as Le fiancé d'Alice
- Daniel Sorano as Le maître d'armes

== Production ==
In René Clair's own words, "Love is the only concern of Les Grandes Manœuvres", and he added that the film was one of the countless variations to be made on the inexhaustible theme of Don Juan. The film is set in a French garrison town in the period just before the First World War, the end of the Belle Époque. Describing the origins of the film, Clair said, "Having passed a part of my childhood near Versailles, I could not forget the cavalry officers, their galloping in the forest of Viroflay, the rumors of their adventures, a duel which the newspapers talked about and in which two of those officers died...." Elsewhere he commented, "For me it is a very sentimental film, even more sentimental because it is situated in the period of my childhood. I put into it things that I saw."

Clair's aim was to create a portrait of provincial life in the years before 1914, and close attention was paid to the fashions of the period and the rituals of military life. Les Grandes Manœuvres was Clair's first film in colour, a medium he had wanted to use since his time in England in the late 1930s, because, he stated, "it would enable him to keep reality at a distance" The production designer, Léon Barsacq, created sets in which muted colours were dominant, with furniture and accessories in black or white, and costumes mainly in beige or brown; they even sprayed the leaves of trees with yellow so that their shade of green would not be too bright. The only bold colour permitted was red, the red of the military uniforms.

The film's budget was 222 million old francs; of this, Clair's salary was 20 million and Gérard Philipe's was 18 million.

Filming began at the Studios de Boulogne on 28 April 1955, and continued until 2 July, after which the film was completed rapidly; editing had been largely determined during shooting, with few alternative shots being taken. However, Clair hesitated between different endings for the film, two of which were actually filmed and shown to groups of friends to gauge their reaction. Although several favoured the more bitter and tragic ending, Clair adopted the one that was more delicate and low-key, as being more in keeping with his own manner. Even so, it was the first of his films which "ended badly", and thus marked a departure in his style.

== Reception ==
The first screening of Les Grandes Manœuvres took place in Moscow, on 17 October 1955, as part of the first "French Film Week" (Semaine du cinéma français). (This provoked one attack in a French newspaper which criticised its selection for the USSR because it suggested that the French army had nothing better to do than to pursue female conquests. Clair had fuelled this complaint by declaring at his Moscow press conference that in life there was nothing more serious than love.) The French première took place in Paris on 26 October 1955, and was generally well received by both press and public. Those critics who were less than enthusiastic were at any rate respectful. Several of Clair's longtime supporters thought that it was his best film. One of the few hostile reactions came from Claude Mauriac who objected that the performance of Gérard Philipe made a sympathetic character out of a complaisant seducer.

André Bazin observed that the film was "like those classics which do not claim originality in their material, only in the manner in which they move the pieces on the chess-board.... Les Grandes Manœuvres begins as vaudeville, continues as comedy, reaches drama, and culminates in tragedy." A positive review by Jacques Doniol-Valcroze appeared in France-Observateur in November 1955 in which he wrote that everything about the film reminded him of an operetta: "We smile, laugh, are astonished, smile again and feel our hearts ache [-] it would be a mistake to underestimate Les Grandes Manoeuvres, as I understand some people have."

The film won two important French prizes, the Prix Louis-Delluc and the Prix Méliès.

Among English-language reviewers, there was consistency in their appreciation of Clair's wit and the visual elegance of his use of colour on the one hand, but on the other a disappointment at his perceived failure to bring sufficient emotional engagement to the film's later scenes. In the words of one British review, Les Grandes Manœuvres was "an exceptionally finished and civilised entertainment [and] not the least of its assets is the impeccable taste with which Clair, for the first time, manipulates colour"; but, "in negotiating the change to a serious ending, the film is less than wholly satisfactory".

Another said, "The film begins beautifully... The gently stylised movements, the light and even rhythm, set [Clair's] own personal tone of comedy.... Later developments, however, demand more than he seems prepared to give... it fails to convey human passions suddenly taking over."

This was echoed by an American reviewer: "[Clair] has shown true artistry in his use of pastel and vivid hues to capture even the nuances of dress, décor and elegance of a pre-World War I garrison town.... [The film] is a fragile and compassionate but rarely moving delineation of the grand passion."

Variety wrote "Clair's clever notations on the era give the film its main appeal." A later review in the same magazine called it a "thoughtful bit of Gallic fluff."

An Irish review agreed that, "Rene Clair's Summer Manoeuvres is anything but a deeply "committed" film, and survives chiefly for its evocation of period.... [The film] does not quite compass the violent change from manners to passion...". A more sympathetic summary appeared in The Times: "Les Grandes Manoeuvres is a sigh for lost youth, for a lost generation, and for, perhaps, l'amour, as against love, and its only failing is that, in enchanting the senses, it fails to touch the heart."

In 1974, the film was given an out-of-competition screening at the Cannes Film Festival.

Clair himself considered Les Grandes Manœuvres (along with Le silence est d'or) to be the best of his post-war films. However, it appeared at a time when the classical studio-bound style of French cinema which Clair represented was coming under attack from a new generation of French critics and filmmakers, and henceforth his films were generally less well received.
