= The Bouquinquant Brothers =

1947 film

- Directed by: Louis Daquin
- Written by: André Cerf; Louis Daquin; Roger Vailland
- Based on: The Bouquinquant Brothers by Jean Prévost
- Produced by: Pierre Blancheville; André Cornu; Alexandre Kamenka
- Starring: Albert Préjean; Madeleine Robinson; Roger Pigaut
- Cinematography: Louis Page
- Edited by: Claude Nicole
- Music by: Jean Wiener
- Production companies: Radio Cinéma; Société des Films Alkam
- Distributed by: Radio Cinéma
- Release date: 15 September 1947
- Running time: 99 minutes
- Country: France
- Language: French

The Bouquinquant Brothers (French: Les frères Bouquinquant) is a 1947 French drama film directed by Louis Daquin and starring Albert Préjean, Madeleine Robinson and Roger Pigaut. It is based on the 1930 novel The Bouquinquant Brothers by Jean Prévost. It premiered at the 1947 Venice Film Festival and went on general release in France the following year. The film's sets were designed by the art director Paul Bertrand. It marked the film debut of the actress Juliette Gréco.

== Synopsis ==
Julie Moret arrives in Paris from the provinces looking for work. She meets and marries Léon Bouquinquant who initially seems charming, but turns out to be a drunken brute. She soon begins to develop feelings for his brother Pierre.

== Cast ==
- Albert Préjean as Léon Bouquinquant
- Madeleine Robinson as Julie Bouquinquant née Moret
- Roger Pigaut as Pierre Bouquinquant
- Mona Dol as Madame Leclerc
- Paul Frankeur as Le commissaire
- Juliette Gréco as Une religieuse
- Abel Jacquin as Louis
- Denise Kerny as Une détenue
- Charles Lavialle as Monsieur Thomas
- Louis Seigner as Le juge d'instruction
- Jean Vilar as Le prêtre
- Victor Vina as Le médecin

== Bibliography ==
- Goble, Alan. The Complete Index to Literary Sources in Film. Walter de Gruyter, 1999.
