= Lady Killer (1937 film) =

1937 film

- Film poster
- French: Gueule d'amour
- Directed by: Jean Grémillon
- Written by: André Beucler; Charles Spaak
- Produced by: Raoul Ploquin
- Starring: Jean Gabin; Mireille Balin; Marguerite Deval
- Cinematography: Günther Rittau
- Edited by: Jean Grémillon
- Music by: Lothar Brühne
- Production companies: L'Alliance Cinématographique Européenne; UFA
- Distributed by: L'Alliance Cinématographique Européenne
- Release date: 13 October 1937
- Running time: 94 minutes
- Country: France
- Language: French

Lady Killer (French: Gueule d'amour) is a 1937 French drama film directed by Jean Grémillon and starring Jean Gabin, Mireille Balin and Marguerite Deval. It has been classified as both a film noir and an entry into the poetic realist group of films of the late 1930s. It was produced by the German company UFA in conjunction with its own French subsidiary ACE. Like Port of Shadows it drew on the tradition of German expressionism in its lighting and set design, although the Nazi authorities were opposed to the expressionist style.

It was shot at the Babelsberg Studios in Berlin and on location around Cannes, Orange and Paris. The film's sets were designed by the art directors Hermann Asmus and Max Mellin. The film was selected for screening as part of the Cannes Classics section at the 2016 Cannes Film Festival.

== Cast ==
- Jean Gabin as Lucien Bourrache, 'Gueule d'Amour'
- Mireille Balin as Madeleine
- Pierre Etchepare as hotel owner
- Henri Poupon as Monsieur Cailloux
- Jean Aymé as Le valet de chambre
- Pierre Magnier as Commandant
- Marguerite Deval as Madame Courtois
- René Lefèvre as René
- Jane Marken as Madame Cailloux (as Jeanne Marken)
- Paulette Noizeux
- André Siméon as restaurant manager (as Siméon)
- Pierre Labry as printer
- Lucien Dayle as client
- Louis Florencie as waiter (as Florencie)
- Paul Fournier as client
- André Carnège as Captain
- Maurice Baquet as the sick soldier
- Frédéric Mariotti as Le cantonnier (as Mariotti)

== Bibliography ==
- Driskell, Jonathan . The French Screen Goddess: Film Stardom and the Modern Woman in 1930s France. I.B.Tauris, 2015.
- Spicer, Andrew (ed.) European Film Noir. Manchester University Press, 2019.
- Walker-Morrison, Deborah. Classic French Noir: Gender and the Cinema of Fatal Desire. Bloomsbury Publishing, 2020.
- Williams, Alan Larson. Republic of Images: A History of French Filmmaking. Harvard University Press, 1992.
