= The Mysteries of Paris (1935 film) =

1935 film

- Directed by: Félix Gandéra
- Written by: Félix Gandéra
- Based on: The Mysteries of Paris by Eugène Sue
- Produced by: Félix Gandéra
- Starring: Lucien Baroux; Madeleine Ozeray; Marcelle Géniat
- Cinematography: Fédote Bourgasoff; Jean Isnard
- Edited by: Marcel Cravenne; Yvonne Martin; Marguerite Renoir
- Music by: Georges Auric
- Production company: Productions Félix Gandéra
- Distributed by: Les Films Osso
- Release date: 14 October 1935
- Running time: 110 minutes
- Country: France
- Language: French

The Mysteries of Paris (French: Les mystères de Paris) is a 1935 French historical drama film directed by Félix Gandéra and starring Lucien Baroux, Madeleine Ozeray and Marcelle Géniat. It is based on the novel The Mysteries of Paris by Eugène Sue. The film's sets were designed by the art directors André Barsacq and Robert Gys.

== Synopsis ==
In the mid-nineteenth century, the Duke of Gérolstein returns to Paris to try and find his daughter who was taken from his by her mother sixteen years earlier.

== Cast ==
- Lucien Baroux as Monsieur Pipelet
- Madeleine Ozeray as Fleur-de-Marie
- Marcelle Géniat as La Chouette
- Roger Karl as Le grand-duc de Gérolstein
- Constant Rémy as Le maître d'école
- Raymond Cordy as Cabrion
- Habib Benglia as Le docteur noir
- François Rodon as Tortillard – le gamin
- Georges Vitray as Murph
- Rolla Norman as Tom
- Lydie Villars as Madame Pipelet
- Lucienne Le Marchand as Sarah
- Raoul Marco as Le Chourineur
- Marthe Mussine as Rigolette
- Henri Rollan as Rodolphe
- Nadia Sibirskaïa as Madame Mont Saint-Jean
- Léon Arvel
- Jean Clarens
- Noël Darzal
- Hélène Dastry
- Marie-Hélène Dasté
- Jeanne de Fava
- Albert Gercourt
- André Marnay
- Claude May
- Maurice Méric
- Laurence Rivoire
- Molly Robert
- Mary Serta
- Made Siamé
- André Siméon

== Bibliography ==
- Goble, Alan. The Complete Index to Literary Sources in Film. Walter de Gruyter, 1999.
