= Tuesday's Guest =

- Film poster
- Directed by: Jacques Deval
- Written by: Jacques Deval (play La Femme de ta jeunesse); Jean Ferry
- Produced by: Raoul Ploquin; Alain Poiré
- Starring: Bernard Blier; Michel Auclair; Madeleine Robinson
- Cinematography: Louis Page
- Edited by: Germaine Fouquet
- Music by: Georges Van Parys
- Production companies: Gaumont; Les Films Raoul Ploquin
- Distributed by: Gaumont Distribution
- Release date: 21 June 1950
- Running time: 100 minutes
- Country: France
- Language: French

Tuesday's Guest (French: L'invité du mardi) is a 1950 French drama film directed by Jacques Deval and starring Bernard Blier, Michel Auclair and Madeleine Robinson. It was adapted by Deval from his own play.

The film's sets were designed by the art director Robert Clavel.

== Cast ==
- Bernard Blier as Charles Josse
- Michel Auclair as Maurice Vineuse
- Madeleine Robinson as Fernande Josse
- Nadine Alari as Ginette
- Lucien Guervil
- Bernadette Lange
- Geneviève Morel as La patronne
- Suzanne Courtal
- Paul Azaïs
- Jacques Dynam as Jean Gompers
- Jean Berton as Un agent
- Christine Covil as Petit rôle
- Paule Launay
- Lucienne Legrand as Petit rôle
- Jean Sylvère as L'employé de la SNCF

== Bibliography ==
- Philippe Durant. Bernard Blier, itinéraire. Favre, 2009.
