= Madeleine Renaud =

French actress (1900–1994)

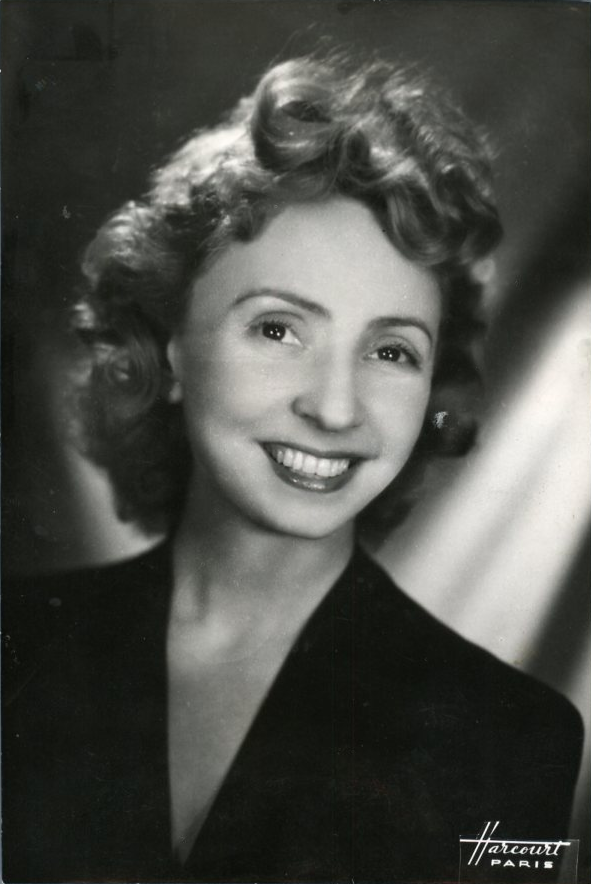
- Renaud in 1945
- Born: Lucie Madeleine Renaud; 21 February 1900; Paris, France
- Died: 23 September 1994 (aged 94); Neuilly-sur-Seine, Île-de-France, France
- Years active: 1922–1990
- Spouse(s): Charles Granval (m. 1922–?); Jean-Louis Barrault (m. 1940–1994)
- Children: Jean-Pierre Granval

Lucie Madeleine Renaud (French: [ʁəno]; 21 February 1900 – 23 September 1994) was a French actress best remembered for her work in the theatre. She did though appear in several films directed by Jean Grémillon including Remorques (Stormy Waters, 1941) and Lumière d'été (Summer Light, 1943).

== Personal life ==
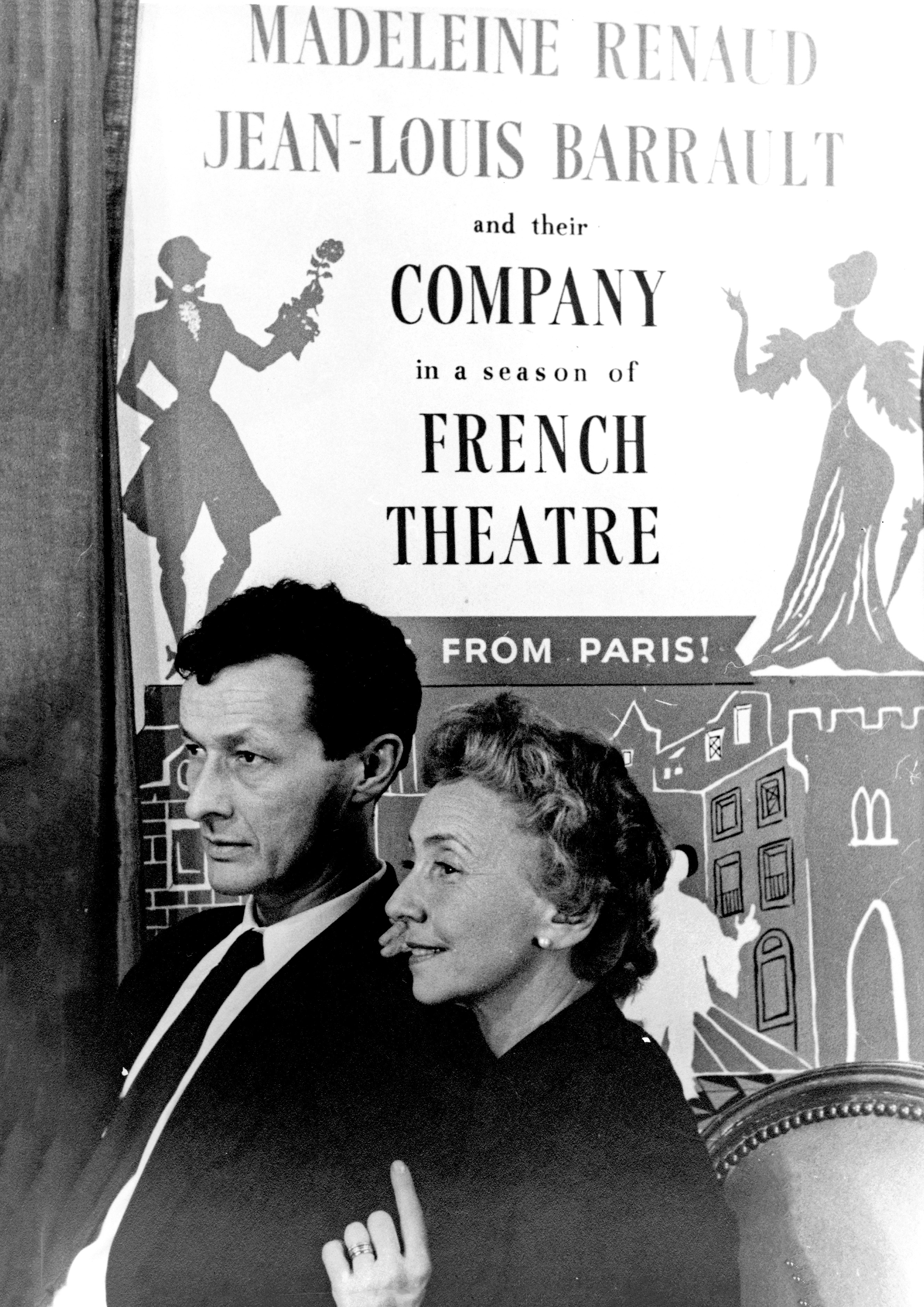
Renaud and husband Jean-Louis Barrault in 1952 (photo by Carl Van Vechten)

Renaud had a son, Jean-Pierre Granval (10 December 1923 – 28 May 1998), by her first marriage to Charles Granval. In 1940, Renaud married her second husband, actor-director Jean-Louis Barrault (born in 1910). The couple acted together and co-founded a number of theater companies, touring extensively throughout North and South America.

== Selected filmography ==
- Vent debout (1923)
- The Dying Land (1927) - Roussille Lumineau
- Jean de la Lune (1929) - Marceline
- Serments (1931) - Maria
- Mistigri (1931) - Nell 'Mistigri' Marignan
- La couturière de Lunéville (1932) - Anna Tripied / Irene Salvago
- The Beautiful Sailor (1932) - Marinette
- La Maternelle (1933) - Rose
- The Tunnel (1933) - Mary Mac Allan
- Maria Chapdelaine (1934) - Maria Chapdelaine
- Primerose (1934) - Primerose
- Helene (1936) - Hélène Wilfur
- The Strange Monsieur Victor (1938)
- Stormy Waters (1941) - Yvonne Laurent (as Madeleine Renaud de la Comédie Francaise)
- Summer Light (1943)
- The Stairs Without End (1943)
- The Woman Who Dared (1944) - Thérèse Gauthier
- Le Plaisir (1952) - Julia Tellier (segment "La Maison Tellier")
- Dialogue of the Carmelites (1960) - La première prieure
- The Longest Day (1962) - Mother Superior
- The Devil by the Tail (1969)
- Sweet Deception (1972)
