= Fritz Soot =

German opera singer

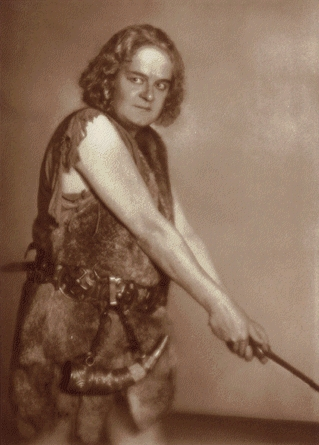
Fritz Soot as Siegfried, photograph by Nicola Perscheid

Friedrich Wilhelm Soot (20 August 1878 - 9 June 1965) was a German opera singer (tenor).

== Life ==
Born in Wellesweiler, Soot became an early member of the Badisches Staatstheater Karlsruhe ensemble. At the same time he studied singing between 1900 and 1907 and made his official debut as Tonio in 1908. In 1909 he also took part in the sensational premiere of Strauss' Elektra at the Semperoper in Dresden.

After the First World War Soot was engaged at the Staatstheater Stuttgart. There he was able to make a name for himself as an interpreter of Richard Wagner. Between 1922 and 1944 Soot was regarded as the "star" of the Staatsoper Unter den Linden. At the same time he had regular appearances at the summer festival of Sopot between 1924 and 1931.

In the winter of 1924/25 Soot made an extremely successful guest appearance at the Covent Garden Theatre in London. In 1935 he was brought to the State Opera in Berlin as the "director of the artistic office". In 1941 he took part in the Zarah Leander movie Der Weg ins Freie as a "singer at the rehearsal" (Zarah Leander played an opera singer).

After the Second World War Soot appeared again as a singer from 1946 to 1952, but could not quite continue his earlier successes.

In the winter of 1952/53 Soot gave his farewell performance and retired from public life. At age 86 Fritz Soot died on June 9, 1965, in Berlin and found his last resting place there.

== Roles (selection) ==
- Tonio – La fille du régiment (Donizetti)
- Mephistofeles – Doktor Faust (Busoni)
- Young Servant – Elektra (Strauss)
- Italian Singer – Der Rosenkavalier (Strauss)
- Tambourmajor – Wozzeck (Berg)
- Asmodi – Das Herz (Hans Pfitzner)
- Hoffmann – The Tales of Hoffmann (Offenbach)
- Speaker of the Court of the Dead – Die Verurteilung des Lukullus (Dessau)

== Bibliography ==
- Walther Killy among others (editor): Deutsche Biographische Enzyklopädie, p. 377.
