= The Woman Who Dared (1944 film) =

- Movie poster
- Directed by: Jean Grémillon
- Written by: Albert Valentin; Charles Spaak
- Produced by: Raoul Ploquin
- Starring: Madeleine Renaud; Charles Vanel
- Cinematography: Roger Arrignon; Louis Page
- Edited by: Louisette Hautecoeur
- Music by: Roland Manuel
- Release date: 1944
- Running time: 105 minutes
- Country: France
- Language: French

The Woman Who Dared (French title: Le Ciel est à vous) (English: The Sky is Yours) is a 1944 French drama film directed by Jean Grémillon and starring Madeleine Renaud and Charles Vanel. In April 2019, a restored version of the film was selected to be shown in the Cannes Classics section at the 2019 Cannes Film Festival.

== Plot ==
The mechanic Pierre Gauthier runs his own garage until he gets disappropriated because his grounds are required for a new airport. Together with his wife Thérèse, their two children and his moody mother-in-law he has to move. Due to his friendly nature he renders all kinds of services to everybody who asks him for a favour. When he helps a businessman whose car has broken down in the middle of the night, he and his wife are offered a new job, managing an auto dealership and service business in another town. Thérèse takes the new job on a trial basis, leaving Pierre to care for their children. During her absence, Pierre, an ex WWI flyer, returns to his love for aviation and neglects his work and family. When Thérèse returns, there is conflict until eventually she too discovers the joy of aviation and learns to understand Pierre. After they mutually struggle to follow their dream of aviation success, Thérèse decides to attempt to break a long-distance flight record, and succeeds.

== Cast ==
- Madeleine Renaud – Thérèse Gauthier
- Charles Vanel – Pierre Gauthier
- Jean Debucourt – Larcher
- Raymonde Vernay – Madame Brissard
- Léonce Corne – Doctor Maulette
- Raoul Marco – Monsieur Noblet
- Albert Rémy – Marcel
- Robert Le Fort – Robert
- Anne-Marie Labaye – Jacqueline
- Michel François – Claude
- Gaston Mauger – the successor to Doctor Maulette
- Paul Demange – Petit ("Little")
- Henry Houry – a member of the administration council
- Anne Vandène – Lucienne Ivry

== Bibliography ==
- Higbee, Will & Leahy, Sarah. Studies in French Cinema: UK Perspectives, 1985–2010. Intellect Books, 2011.
