= Margherita Perras =

Greek soprano (1908–1984)

Margherita Perras (sometimes Margarita Perra) (15 January 1908 – 2 February 1984) was a Greek soprano.

Born in Thessaloniki or Monastiri, Perras sang in church from childhood, performing solos for weddings and funerals. She studied at the state conservatory in Thessaloniki and then at the Berlin University of the Arts, where a 1927 performance as Norina attracted the attention of Bruno Walter, who hired her for the Städtische Oper. There she sang the role of Nuri in Tiefland and Cupid in Orfeo ed Euridice in 1927; the following year she sang the title role in the local premiere of Hanneles Himmelfahrt by Paul Graener. After touring in Spain, Argentina, and Brazil, she took up residence at the Berlin Staatsoper, and in 1935 she received acclaim for her performance of Konstanze under Felix Weingartner at the Vienna State Opera, a role which she repeated for Salzburg in 1935 and at Glyndebourne in 1937. Other Mozart roles, such as the Queen of the Night, Susanna, and Pamina, soon followed. In 1936 she sang Gilda for the Royal Opera House. In 1937 she married and settled in Zürich until her death in 1984, aged 76.

Until 1944, she was exclusively a recitalist, but for the 1946–47 season she returned to the stage in Vienna. She was highly regarded for her performances of the songs of Othmar Schoeck.
