= Summer Light (film) =

1943 film

- Directed by: Jean Grémillon
- Written by: Pierre Laroche; Jacques Prévert
- Produced by: André Paulvé
- Starring: Madeleine Renaud; Pierre Brasseur; Madeleine Robinson
- Cinematography: Louis Page
- Edited by: Louisette Hautecoeur
- Music by: Roland Manuel
- Production company: Films André Paulvé
- Distributed by: DisCina
- Release date: 26 May 1943
- Running time: 112 minutes
- Country: France
- Language: French

Summer Light (French: Lumière d'été) is a 1943 French drama film directed by Jean Grémillon and starring Madeleine Renaud, Pierre Brasseur and Madeleine Robinson.

It was shot at the Victorine Studios in Nice and on location in Soursac. The film's sets were designed by the art director André Barsacq.

== Cast ==
- Madeleine Renaud as Cricri
- Pierre Brasseur as Roland
- Madeleine Robinson as Michèle
- Paul Bernard as Patrice Le Verdier
- Georges Marchal as Julien
- Léonce Corne as Tonton
- Charles Blavette as Vincent
- Jane Marken as Louise Martinet
- Henri Pons as Amédée
- Gérard Lecomte as Dany
- Marcel Lévesque as Monsieur Louis
- Raymond Aimos as Ernest

== Bibliography ==
- Crisp, Colin. French Cinema—A Critical Filmography: Volume 2, 1940–1958. Indiana University Press, 2015.
