= Louis Page (cinematographer) =

French cinematographer

- Born: 1905; Lyon, France
- Died: 3 March 1990 (aged 84–85); Soucy, France
- Occupation: Cinematographer
- Years active: 1931–1966 (film)

Louis Page (1905 – 3 March 1990) was a French cinematographer.

== Selected filmography ==
- The Perfume of the Lady in Black (1931)
- Dainah the Mulatto (1932)
- Sanders of the River (1935)
- Marinella (1936)
- Girls of Paris (1936)
- Forty Little Mothers (1936)
- The Silent Battle (1937)
- The Lafarge Case (1938)
- Summer Light (1943)
- Florence Is Crazy (1944)
- The Bellman (1945)
- François Villon (1945)
- The Bouquinquant Brothers (1947)
- The Loves of Colette (1948)
- The Walls of Malapaga (1949)
- Old Boys of Saint-Loup (1950)
- Tuesday's Guest (1950)
- Young Love (1951)
- Skipper Next to God (1951)
- She and Me (1952)
- The Love of a Woman (1953)
- The Bride Is Much Too Beautiful (1956)
- Plucking the Daisy (1956)
- Maigret Sets a Trap (1958)
- Maigret and the Saint-Fiacre Case (1959)
- Rue des prairies (1959)
- The Gentleman from Epsom (1962)
- Maigret Sees Red (1963)
- Monsieur (1964)

== Bibliography ==
- H. Mario Raimondo-Souto. Motion Picture Photography: A History, 1891–1960. McFarland, 2006.
