= Le Livre de Christophe Colomb =

Le Livre de Christophe Colomb (The Book of Christopher Columbus) is a theatre play in two parts by the French author Paul Claudel. The play was commissioned by the German theatre director Max Reinhardt, and originally conceived as an opera.

A first version written in 1927 was premiered at the Staatsoper Unter den Linden on 30 June 1930 with music by Darius Milhaud.

In 1953, for the mise-en-scène by Jean-Louis Barrault at the théâtre Marigny, Darius Milhaud composed new incidental music different from that of the opera.

== Notable mises en scène ==
- 1960 : Christophe Colomb, directed by Jean-Louis Barrault, théâtre de l'Odéon
- 1975 : Christophe Colomb, directed by Jean-Louis Barrault, théâtre d'Orsay
