= Charles Granval =

French actor (1882–1943)

- Born: Charles Louis Gribouval; 21 December 1882; Rouen, Seine-Maritime, France
- Died: 28 July 1943 (aged 60); Honfleur, Calvados, France
- Occupation: Actor
- Years active: 1918-1944 (film )
- Spouse: Madeleine Renaud (m. 1922, divorced)
- Children: Jean-Pierre Granval

Charles Granval (born Charles Louis Gribouval; December 21, 1882 – July 28, 1943) was a French stage and film actor. He was Jean-Pierre Granval's father.

== Selected filmography ==
- Boudu Saved from Drowning (1932)
- Golgotha (1935)
- La belle équipe (1936)
- Sarati the Terrible (1937)
- The Terrible Lovers (1936)
- Blanchette (1937)
- A Woman of No Importance (1937)
- Pépé le Moko (1937)
- The Man from Nowhere (1937)
- White Cargo (1937)
- The End of the Day (1939)
- First Ball (1941)
- Monsieur La Souris (1942)
- Colonel Pontcarral (1942)
- The Woman I Loved Most (1942)
- La Nuit fantastique (1942)
- The Benefactor (1942)
- The Count of Monte Cristo (1943)

== Bibliography ==
- Nicholas Macdonald. In Search of La Grande Illusion: A Critical Appreciation of Jean Renoir's Elusive Masterpiece. McFarland, 2013.
