= Jean-Pierre Granval =

French actor (1923–1998)

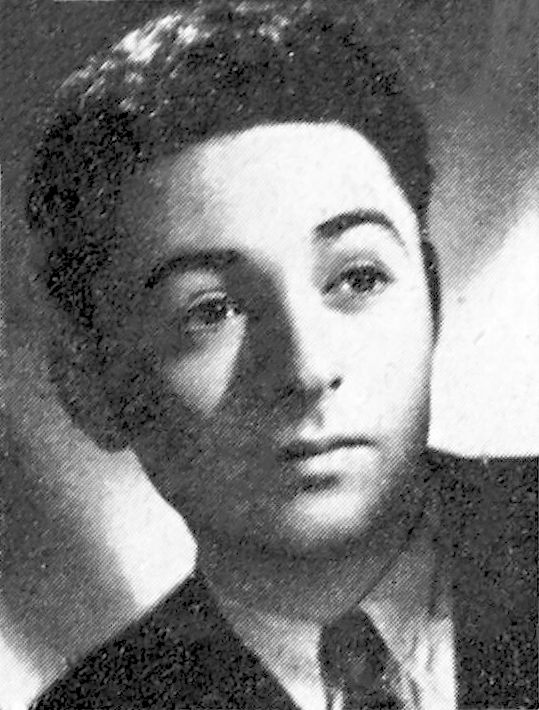
- Image of Jean-Pierre Granval
- Born: Jean-Pierre Charles Gribouval; 10 December 1923
- Died: 28 May 1998 (aged 74); Poissy
- Occupations: Actor, theatre director
- Parent(s): Charles Granval; Madeleine Renaud
- Relatives: Jean-Louis Barrault (step-father)

Jean-Pierre Granval, stage name of Jean-Pierre Charles Gribouval, (10 December 1923 – 28 May 1998) was a 20th-century French stage and film actor as well as a theatre director.

Jean-Pierre Granval is the son of Charles Granval and Madeleine Renaud, both sociétaires of the Comédie-Française. He appeared in 4 feature films and some TV films, including some classics : The Satin Slipper, Harold and Maude, The Cherry Orchard, Double Inconstancy.

He is buried in Pennedepie (Calvados).

== Filmography ==
=== Film ===
- 1959: Maigret and the Saint-Fiacre Case (by Jean Delannoy) - the journalist
- 1959: Picnic on the Grass (by Jean Renoir) - Ritou
- 1969: Life Love Death

=== Television ===
- 1959: The Doctor's Horrible Experiment (TV Movie, by Jean Renoir) - le patron de l'hôtel de passe
- 1972: Les Fossés de Vincennes (TV Movie, by Pierre Cardinal) - le conseiller Réal

== Theatre ==
=== Comedian ===
- 1946: Hamlet by William Shakespeare, directed by Jean-Louis Barrault, Théâtre Marigny
- 1946: Les Fausses Confidences by Marivaux, directed by Jean-Louis Barrault, Théâtre Marigny
- 1946: Baptiste by Jacques Prévert & Joseph Kosma, directed by Jean-Louis Barrault, Théâtre Marigny
- 1947: Les Fausses Confidences by Marivaux, directed by Jean-Louis Barrault, Théâtre des Célestins
- 1947: Baptiste by Jacques Prévert & Joseph Kosma, directed by Jean-Louis Barrault, Théâtre des Célestins
- 1947: La Fontaine de jouvence by Boris Kochno, directed by Jean-Louis Barrault, Théâtre Marigny
- 1947: The Trial after Franz Kafka, directed by Jean-Louis Barrault, Théâtre Marigny
- 1948: The State of Siege by Albert Camus, directed by Jean-Louis Barrault, Théâtre Marigny
- 1948: Occupe-toi d'Amélie by Georges Feydeau, directed by Jean-Louis Barrault, Théâtre Marigny
- 1949: Le Bossu by Paul Féval and Auguste Anicet-Bourgeois, directed by Jean-Louis Barrault, Théâtre Marigny
- 1951: The Satin Slipper by Paul Claudel, directed by Jean-Louis Barrault, Théâtre des Célestins
- 1953: Occupe-toi d'Amélie! by Georges Feydeau, directed by Jean-Louis Barrault, Théâtre des Célestins
- 1955: Intermezzo by Jean Giraudoux, directed by Jean-Louis Barrault, Théâtre Marigny, Théâtre des Célestins
- 1955: The Cherry Orchard by Anton Chekhov, directed by Jean-Louis Barrault, Théâtre des Célestins
- 1955: Le Chien du jardinier by Georges Neveux after Lope de Vega, directed by Jean-Louis Barrault, Théâtre Marigny
- 1955: Occupe-toi d'Amélie by Georges Feydeau, directed by Jean-Louis Barrault, Théâtre Marigny
- 1956: The Misanthrope by Molière, directed by Jean-Louis Barrault, Théâtre des Célestins
- 1956: Le Chien du jardinier by Lope de Vega, directed by Jean-Louis Barrault, Théâtre des Célestins
- 1956: Histoire de Vasco by Georges Schehadé, directed by Jean-Louis Barrault, Théâtre des Célestins
- 1958: The Satin Slipper by Paul Claudel, directed by Jean-Louis Barrault, Théâtre du Palais-Royal
- 1959: Les Fausses Confidences by Marivaux, directed by Jean-Louis Barrault, Odéon-Théâtre de France
- 1960: The Cherry Orchard by Anton Chekhov, directed by Jean-Louis Barrault, Odéon-Théâtre de France
- 1960: Christophe Colomb by Paul Claudel, directed by Jean-Louis Barrault, Odéon-Théâtre de France
- 1960: Occupe-toi d'Amélie by Georges Feydeau, directed by Jean-Louis Barrault, Odéon-Théâtre de France
- 1961: Amphitryon by Molière, directed by Jean-Louis Barrault, Odéon-Théâtre de France
- 1963: The Cherry Orchard by Anton Chekhov, directed by Jean-Louis Barrault, Odéon-Théâtre de France
- 1965: Amerika by Max Brod after Franz Kafka, directed by Antoine Bourseiller, Odéon-Théâtre de France
- 1973: Harold and Maude by Colin Higgins, directed by Jean-Louis Barrault, Théâtre Récamier
- 1974: Thus Spoke Zarathustra by Friedrich Nietzsche, directed by Jean-Louis Barrault, Théâtre d'Orsay
- 1975: Christophe Colomb by Paul Claudel, directed by Jean-Louis Barrault, Théâtre d'Orsay
- 1975: Les Nuits de Paris after Rétif de la Bretonne, directed by Jean-Louis Barrault, Théâtre d'Orsay
- 1980: Harold and Maude by Colin Higgins, directed by Jean-Louis Barrault, Théâtre d'Orsay

=== Theatre director ===
- 1974: Sous le vent des îles Baléares by Paul Claudel, Théâtre Récamier
- 1983: Lettres d'une mère à son fils by Marcel Jouhandeau, La Criée, Théâtre Renaud-Barrault
- 1984: Pense à l’Afrique after Think of Africa by Gordon Dryland, Théâtre Renaud-Barrault
- 1986: Les Salons by Bernard Minoret and Claude Arnaud, Théâtre Renaud-Barrault
