= Raoul Ploquin =

French film producer and screenwriter (1900–1992)

Raoul Edouard Ploquin (20 May 1900 – 29 November 1992) was a French film producer, production manager and screenwriter. He was co-nominated for the Academy Award for Best Story for the film The Sheep Has Five Legs (1954).

== Selected filmography ==
- The Adventures of Robert Macaire (1925)
- Paris in Five Days (1926)
- The Girl and the Boy (1931)
- About an Inquest (1931)
- Court Waltzes (1933)
- The Star of Valencia (1933)
- A Day Will Come (1934)
- Night in May (1934)
- At the End of the World (1934)
- The Devil in the Bottle (1935)
- The Decoy (1935)
- Counsel for Romance (1936)
- The Heart Disposes (1936)
- Donogoo (1936)
- The Blue Mouse (1936)
- S.O.S. Sahara (1938)
- The Strange Monsieur Victor (1938)
- The Mondesir Heir (1940)
- The Woman Who Dared (1944)
- The Loves of Colette (1948)
- Tuesday's Guest (1950)
- Without Leaving an Address (1951)
- Love, Madame (1952)
- Twelve Hours of Happiness (1952)
- The Sheep Has Five Legs (1954)
- Le Tracassin or Les Plaisirs de la ville (1961)
- Naked Hearts (1966)
