= Jean Grémillon =

French film director

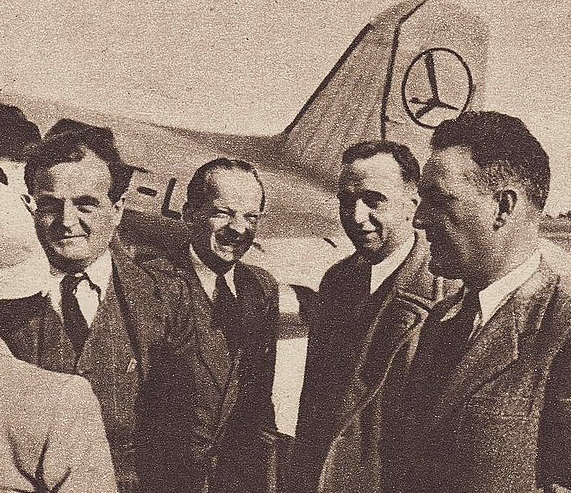
- From L to R: Georges Sadoul, William Dieterle, Michel Fourré-Cormeray, and Jean Grémillon at the Okęcie airport in Warsaw, 1945
- Born: Jean Alexandre Louis Eugène Grémillon; 3 October 1901; Bayeux, Calvados, France
- Died: 25 November 1959 (aged 58); Paris
- Occupations: Film director, screenwriter, composer, author
- Years active: 1923–1959
- Notable work: Gardiens de phare; Gueule d'amour; L'Étrange Monsieur Victor; Remorques; Lumière d'été; Le ciel est à vous
- Spouse: Christiane Grémillon

Jean Grémillon (French: [gʁemijɔ̃]; 3 October 1901 – 25 November 1959) was a French film director.

== Biography ==
Grémillon was born in Bayeux and spent his early years in Cerisy-la-Forêt in Normandy. His father was employed by the Ouest railway company. During his school years he developed an interest in music, and although his father wanted him to become an engineer, in 1920 he went to the Schola Cantorum in Paris. There he studied violin and composition under Vincent d'Indy and met other musicians including Ravel and Stravinsky; he was particularly influenced by the music of Debussy. He also found work in cinemas as a violinist with orchestras accompanying silent films, which provided his introduction to the world of the cinema.

Maldone (1928)

He met the cameraman Georges Périnal who introduced him to the film studios and he started working as an editor and writer of intertitles. In 1923 he began making a series of commissioned short documentary films, especially on the subject of work, with Périnal as his regular cameraman. Another encounter which proved significant for Grémillon's career was with the actor and theatre manager Charles Dullin. In 1927 Dullin was interested in producing and starring in a film and had set up his own production company. He asked Grémillon to direct what would be his first full-length feature, Maldone (Misdeal), with a screenplay by the novelist and playwright Alexandre Arnoux. Although the film suffered cuts when it went into distribution and was not a financial success, it was well-received by critics.

The chance to direct a second silent film was offered to Grémillon by Jacques Feyder who had written a script for Gardiens de phare (The Lighthouse Keepers) (1929), a story of a father and son looking after an isolated Brittany lighthouse, based on a melodrama from the Grand Guignol theatre. Working again with members of Dullin's Atélier theatre company, Grémillon brought together a fascination with the documentary detail of the workings of a lighthouse with the poetic effects of photography and editing which were offered by the drama of the location.

Grémillon's first sound films, La Petite Lise (1930) and Daïnah la métisse (1932), were not commercially successful despite their originality, and for the next few years he had to move abroad to find further work. After several films made in Spain, he was given the opportunity of making another French film by the producer Raoul Ploquin, but financed by the German company UFA and filmed principally in their Berlin studios. The film, Gueule d'amour (Lady Killer) (1937) starring Jean Gabin and Mireille Balin, was well received by the public and marked the start of a sequence of Grémillon's most successful films. It was followed by L'Étrange Monsieur Victor (1938), Remorques (Stormy Waters) (1941), Lumière d'été (Summer Light) (1943), and Le ciel est à vous (The Woman Who Dared) (1944). All four of these starred Madeleine Renaud, and the last two were made under the strict censorship conditions of the German Occupation.

Le ciel est à vous was Grémillon's most popular film of this period (though the expense of its production prevented it from being a commercial success) and it came to be seen as a key film of the Occupation years. It was interpreted by some as promoting the moral code favoured by the Vichy government (family, small town values, hard work), while others saw it as a representation of indomitable French spirit which would not be subdued by the temporary political restraints of the Occupation.

Immediately after the Liberation, Grémillon embarked on Le 6 juin à l'aube (1945), a documentary about D-Day and the Normandy landings which was both poetic and personal. He also wrote the music for the film. Two years later in 1947, he began work on another project, Le Printemps de la liberté. It was commissioned by the Ministère de l'éducation national to mark the 100th anniversary of the 1848 revolution, but it was then cancelled by the government after Grémillon had spent 14 months on preparation for it.

In the years after WW2, Grémillon found it increasingly difficult to get funding for his projects, and there were few completed feature films. They included Pattes blanches (White Paws) (1949), the direction of which he took over from its author Jean Anouilh at a few days notice, and L'Amour d'une femme (The Love of a Woman) (1953); both of these films involved location filming on the coast of Brittany in areas familiar to him from his youth. His other work in the 1950s was mainly devoted teaching and to filming short documentary subjects, but there were still several aborted projects and he was obliged to create his own production company (Les Films du Dauphin) to fund his last works. His final completed film was André Masson et les Quatre Éléments (1959), in which he reflected on artistic creativity through the work of the French painter.

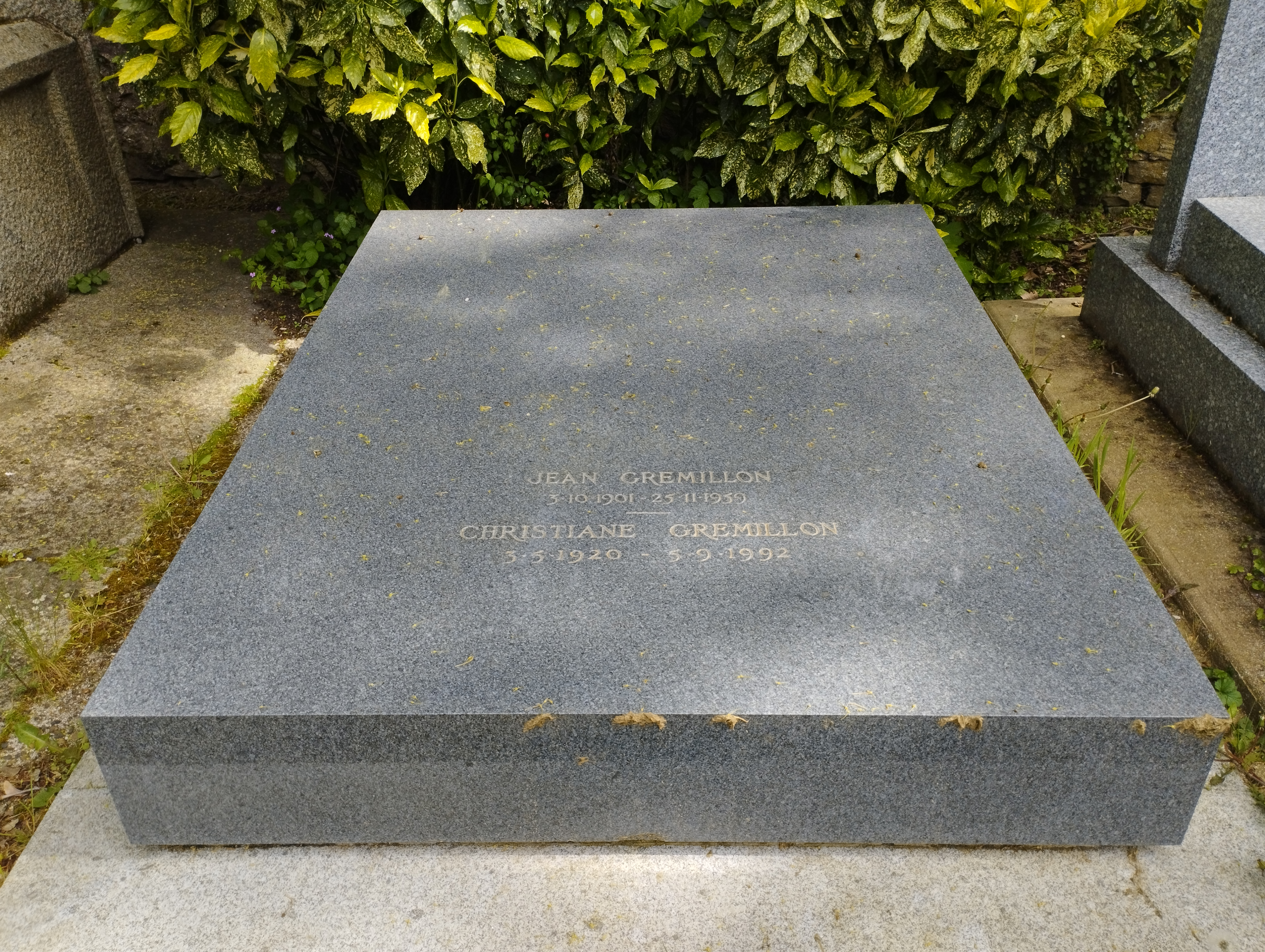
The grave of Jean Grémillon in the cemetery at Saint-Sulpice-de-Favières

In 1944 Grémillon was appointed as president of the Cinémathèque française and one of his projects in that role was the revival of the film societies. After the Liberation he also became president of the film technicians' union, the Syndicat des techniciens. In 1944 during the Occupation he became a member of the French Communist Party. At that time he was also a member of the underground Comité de libération du cinéma français which was planning for the future of the post-war French cinema. In 1958 he served as the president of the Venice Film Festival.

Jean Grémillon died in 1959, at the age of 58, on the same day as the actor Gérard Philipe, and he was buried in the cemetery at Saint-Sulpice-de-Favières in Essonne.

== Reputation ==
Histories and dictionaries of cinema have often described Grémillon as an “unlucky” filmmaker (or cinéaste maudit), whose qualities have never achieved the recognition they deserved. Many of his films featured popular stars but few of them managed to be commercially successful. His difficulties in finding financial backing from film producers, particularly in the post-war period, have been attributed to his reluctance to adapt his ideas to the demands of the film industry, as well as to his affinity with left-wing causes.

One of the distinguishing features of Grémillon’s films is his depiction of the details of working lives especially among those who practised crafts or physical trades. This concern for realism in his characters and their environment was mingled with a feeling for visual poetry and a sense of everyday tragedy, and it permeated both his documentaries and his feature films.

Although the reception of some of his most successful films may have been muted by the conditions of the war years, he was nevertheless appreciated by some critics as the best representative of the realist tradition in French cinema during the period 1930-1945, and the equal of his contemporaries such as Clair, Feyder, Renoir, or Carné.

== Films directed by Jean Grémillon ==
=== Fiction films ===
- 1928: Maldone, (silent)
- 1929: Gardiens de phare (The Lighthouse Keepers), (silent)
- 1930: La Petite Lise (Little Lise)
- 1931: Daïnah la métisse
- 1932: Pour un sou d'amour (For One Cent's Worth of Love)
- 1933: Gonzague (a.k.a. L'Accordeur)
- 1934: La Dolorosa (Our Lady of Sorrows)
- 1936: Valse royale
- 1936: Les Pattes de mouches
- 1937: ¡Centinela, alerta! (completed by Luis Buñuel)
- 1937: Gueule d'amour (Lady Killer)
- 1938: L'Étrange Monsieur Victor (The Strange Monsieur Victor)
- 1941: Remorques (Stormy Waters)
- 1943: Lumière d'été (Summer Light)
- 1944: Le ciel est à vous (The Woman Who Dared)
- 1949: Pattes blanches (White Paws)
- 1951: L'Étrange Madame X (The Strange Madame X)
- 1953: L'Amour d'une femme (The Love of a Woman)

=== Documentary films ===
Most of Grémillon's documentaries were short films, with the exception of Le 6 juin à l'aube (1945). Those marked with an asterisk * are believed lost.

- 1923: Chartres
- 1923: Le Revêtement des routes *
- 1924: La Fabrication du fil *
- 1924: Du fil à l'aiguille *
- 1924: La Bière *
- 1924: Le Roulement à billes *
- 1924: Les Parfums *
- 1924: L'Étirage des ampoules électriques *
- 1924: La Photogénie mécanique *
- 1925: L'Éducation professionnelles des conducteurs de tramway *
- 1925: L'Électrification de la ligne Paris-Vierzon *
- 1925: L'Auvergne *
- 1925: La Naissance des cigognes *
- 1925: Les Acieries de la marine et d'Homecourt *
- 1926: La Vie des travailleurs italiens en France *
- 1926: La Croisière de l'Atalante *
- 1926: Tour au large *
- 1927: Gratuités *
- 1928: Bobs *
- 1932: Le Petit Babouin *
- 1945: Le 6 juin à l'aube
- 1949: Les Charmes de l'existence (The Charms of Life)
- 1951: Les Désastres de la guerre [dir. Pierre Kast; text by Grémillon]
- 1952: Astrologie, ou le Miroir de la vie
- 1952: Alchimie
- 1954: Au cœur de l'Île de France
- 1955: La Maison aux images
- 1956: Haute lisse
- 1959: André Masson et les Quatre Éléments
