= Imperial Violets =

Imperial Violets (French:Violettes impériales) may refer to:

- Imperial Violets (1924 film), a French silent film
- Imperial Violets (1932 film), a French film
- Imperial Violets (operetta), a 1948 musical version
- Imperial Violets (1952 film), a French-Spanish film based on the operetta
- Operation Violettes Imperiales, a 1965 military offensive in the Democratic Republic of the Congo
