= Bouif's Daughter =

1931 film

- Directed by: René Bussy
- Based on: Bouif's Daughter by Georges de La Fouchardière
- Produced by: René Bussy
- Starring: Félicien Tramel
- Music by: René Bussy; Henri Poupon
- Production company: Franco-Belge Cinéma
- Release date: 11 September 1931
- Running time: 60 minutes
- Country: France
- Language: French

Bouif's Daughter (French: La fille du Bouif) is a 1931 French comedy film directed by René Bussy and starring Félicien Tramel. It was based on a play by Georges de La Fouchardière. Tramel had already played the character of Bouif in the 1921 play of the same title and its 1922 silent film version. He reprised it again for a 1933 sound remake.

== Synopsis ==
Having taken some money from the housekeeping fund without his wife's knowledge and then lost it gambling at the horseracing, Bouif seeks sanctuary with his daughter. From her wealthy admirer Isaac, a baron whose racehorses he had lost the money betting on, he manages to recover the lost sum.

== Main cast ==
- Félicien Tramel as Bicard dit 'le Bouif'
- Henri Léoni as Le baron Isaac - l'ami sérieux d'Estelle
- Loulou Hégoburu as Estelle Bicard - la fille du Bouif
- Marthe Derminy as Mme Bicard - la femme du Bouif
- Tarquini d'Or as Un propriétaire
- René Hiéronimus as Un jockey

== Bibliography ==
- Bessy, Maurice & Chirat, Raymond. Histoire du cinéma français: 1929-1934. Pygmalion, 1988.
- Crisp, Colin. Genre, Myth and Convention in the French Cinema, 1929-1939. Indiana University Press, 2002.
- Goble, Alan. The Complete Index to Literary Sources in Film. Walter de Gruyter, 1999.
- Rège, Philippe. Encyclopedia of French Film Directors, Volume 1. Scarecrow Press, 2009.
