= Imperial Violets (operetta) =

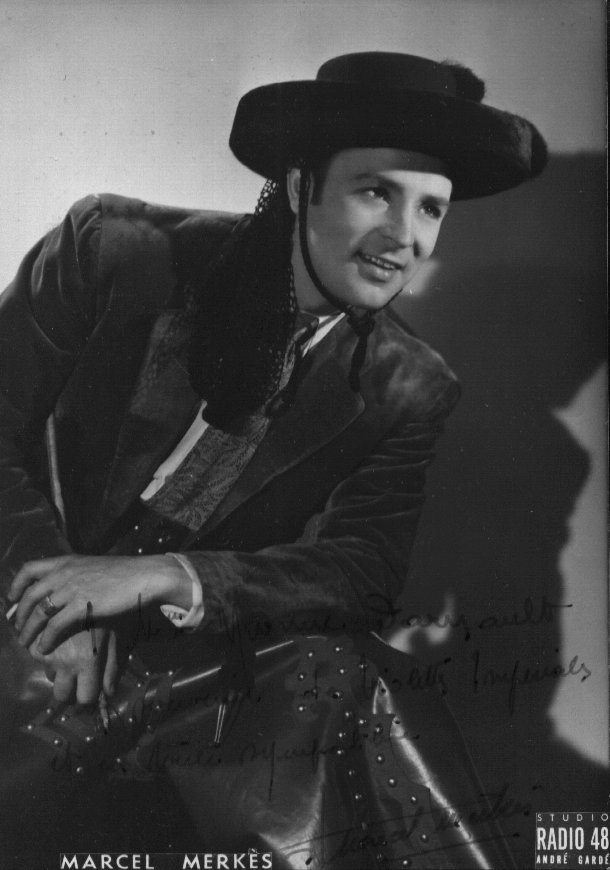
Marcel Merkes was the male star in the original run of Imperial Violets.

Imperial Violets (French:Violettes impériales) is a 1948 French operetta which premiered at the Theatre Mogador in Paris. Its plot follows the screenplay written by Henry Roussel for the 1924 silent film Imperial Violets and its 1932 sound remake, both of which had been popular hits. The operetta was set to music composed by Jacques Météhen with lyrics written by Paul Achard, René Jeanne and Henri Varna.

It is set in the mid-nineteenth century when a young flower girl in Seville falls in love with a man only to find he is involved with another woman, the aristocrat Eugénie de Montijo. Several years later Eugénie gives up the man so that she can herself marry the French Emperor Napoleon III, allowing the heroine to be reunited with her true love.

== Film adaptation ==
In 1952 the operetta itself served as the basis for a film Imperial Violets directed by Richard Pottier and starring Luis Mariano and Carmen Sevilla.

== Bibliography ==
- Lamb, Andrew. 150 Years of Popular Musical Theatre. Yale University Press, 2000.
