= André Roanne =

French actor (1896–1959)

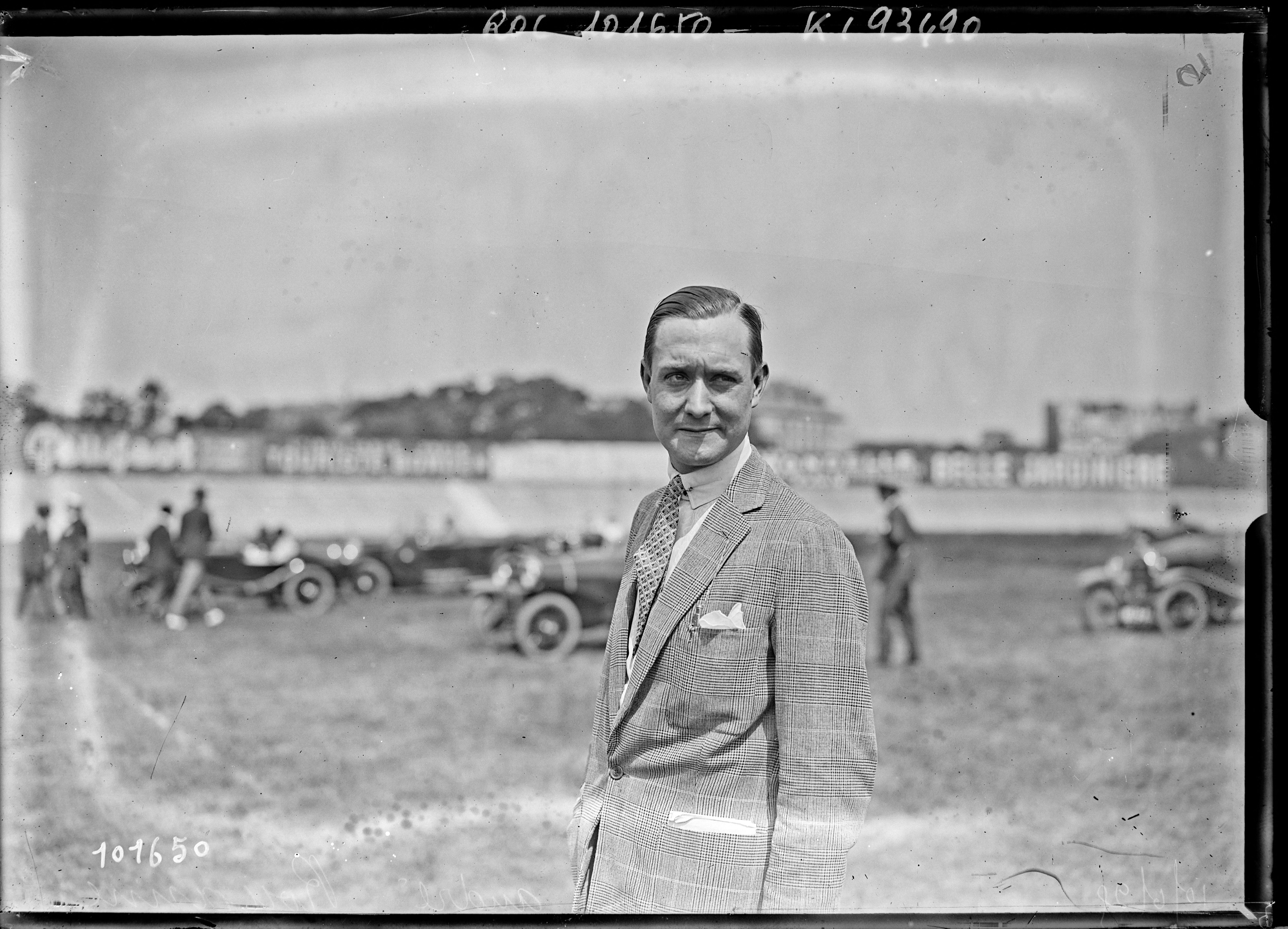
André Roanne in 1925

André Roanne (born André Albert Louis Rahou; 22 September 1896, in Paris – 4 September 1959, in Cannes) was a French actor. He began his career playing in short films, and acted in 91 films in total, most notably those of Fernandel. Most of his films were French; he did, however, also appear in German and Italian works, especially co-productions with French companies. He also served occasionally as an assistant director, screenwriter, technician, and film editor.

== Filmography ==
- 1914 : Le Fils de la divette by Gaston Ravel (short subject)
- 1915 : Madame Fleur-de-Neige by Gaston Ravel (short subject)
- 1915 : Le Même Sang by Gaston Ravel (short subject)
- 1915 : En musique by Gaston Ravel (short subject)
- 1915 : Autour d'une bague by Gaston Ravel (short subject)
- 1915 : La Manœuvre amoureuse or Une erreur by Labruyère (short subject)
- 1916 : Le Pied qui étreint by Jacques Feyder (short subject)
- 1916 : Monsieur Pinson policier by Jacques Feyder and Gaston Ravel (short subject)
- 1916 : Le Consentement de la marquise by Édouard-Émile Violet (short subject)
- 1916 : Têtes de femmes, femmes de tête by Jacques Feyder (short subject)
- 1921 : L'Ombre déchirée by Léon Poirier
- 1921 : Hantise by Jean Kemm
- 1921 : Les ailes s'ouvrent by Guy du Fresnay
- 1921 : L'Atlantide by Jacques Feyder
- 1922 : L'Évasion by Georges Champavert
- 1922 : Maman Pierre by Maurice Chaillot
- 1923 : Tote by Camille de Morlhon (short subject)
- 1923 : Les Opprimés by Henry Roussel
- 1924 : Imperial Violets by Henry Roussel
- 1925 : The Promised Land by Henry Roussel
- 1926 : A Gentleman of the Ring by Gaston Ravel
- 1926 : La Petite Fonctionnaire by Roger Goupillières
- 1926 : The Maid at the Palace by Louis Mercanton
- 1926 : Cinders by Louis Mercanton
- 1926 : The Queen of Moulin Rouge (Die Königin von Moulin Rouge) by Robert Wiene
- 1926 : Mademoiselle Josette, My Woman (Fräulein Josette, meine frau) by Gaston Ravel
- 1926 : Le Berceau de Dieu by Fred LeRoy Granville
- 1926 : Le Fauteuil 47 by Gaston Ravel
- 1927 : The Chocolate Girl by René Hervil
- 1927 : Mademoiselle's Chauffeur by Henri Chomette
- 1927 : The Golden Abyss or Rapa-Nui by Mario Bonnard
- 1928 : The Wonderful Day by René Barberis
- 1928 : La Femme du voisin by Jacques de Baroncelli
- 1928 : Dolly by Pierre Colombier
- 1928 : The Unknown Dancer by René Barberis
- 1928 : Tote et sa chance (German title : Die geschichte einer kleinen Pariserin; Italian title : La storia de una piccola Parigina) by Augusto Genina
- 1929 : Sinful and Sweet (Sündig und süss) de Karel Lamač
- 1929 : Venus by Louis Mercanton
- 1929 : Diary of a Lost Girl (Tagebuch einer Verlorenen) by Georg Wilhelm Pabst
- 1929 : Women on the Edge by Georg Jacoby
- 1930 : La Lettre by Louis Mercanton
- 1930 : Cendrillon de Paris by Jean Hémard
- 1930 : The Caviar Princess by Karel Lamač
- 1930 : Accused, Stand Up! by Maurice Tourneur
- 1930 : Quand nous étions deux by Léonce Perret
- 1931 : Le Joker by Erich Waschneck
- 1931 : La Chanson des nations by Maurice Gleize and Rudolf Meinert
- 1931 : My Cousin from Warsaw by Carmine Gallone
- 1931 : Tout s'arrange by Henri Diamant-Berger
- 1931 : Calais-Douvres by Jean Boyer and Anatole Litvak
- 1931 : Gloria by Hans Behrendt and Yvan Noé
- 1932 : The Triangle of Fire by Edmond T. Gréville and Johannes Guter
- 1932 : Ne sois pas jalouse by Augusto Genina
- 1932 : Colette et son mari or Les amoureux de Colette by André Pellenc (short subject)
- 1932 : Nicole and Her Virtue by René Hervil
- 1932 : Beauty Spot by Pierre Caron
- 1932 : L'Amour en vitesse by Johannes Guter and Claude Heymann
- 1932 : Cognasse by Louis Mercanton
- 1932 : My Priest Among the Rich by E.B Donatien
- 1933 : Baby by Pierre Billon and Karel Lamač
- 1933 : Pour être aimé by Jacques Tourneur
- 1933 : Le Coq du régiment by Maurice Cammage
- 1934 : Le Voyage de Monsieur Perrichon by Jean Tarride
- 1934 : Paris-Deauville by Jean Delannoy
- 1934 : The Imberger Mystery by Jacques Séverac
- 1934 : L'Aristo by André Berthomieu
- 1934 : Une nuit de folies by Maurice Cammage
- 1934 : Le Cavalier Lafleur by Pierre-Jean Ducis
- 1934 : L'Affaire Sternberg by Robert Péguy
- 1935 : La Mariée du régiment by Maurice Cammage
- 1935 : Quelle drôle de gosse by Léo Joannon
- 1935 : Un soir de bombe by Maurice Cammage
- 1935 : Mademoiselle Lucie, comtesse (short subject)
- 1935 : L'École des vierges by Pierre Weill
- 1936 : Girls of Paris by Claude Vermorel
- 1936 : Les Demi Vierges by Pierre Caron
- 1937 : Gigolette by Yvan Noé
- 1937 : Police mondaine by Michel Bernheim and Christian Chamborant
- 1937 : The Club of Aristocrats by Pierre Colombier
- 1937 : Mon député et sa femme by Maurice Cammage
- 1937 : Ne tuez pas Dolly by Jean Delannoy (short subject)
- 1938 : Petite Peste by Jean de Limur
- 1938 : Café de Paris by Yves Mirande and Georges Lacombe
- 1938 : Gibraltar by Fedor Ozep
- 1938 : Les cinq sous de Lavarède by Maurice Cammage
- 1938 : People Who Travel by Jacques Feyder
- 1939 : Entente cordiale by Marcel L'Herbier
- 1939 : Pièges by Robert Siodmak
- 1939 : The Porter from Maxim's by Maurice Cammage
- 1940 : Monsieur Hector by Maurice Cammage
- 1943 : Finance noire by Félix Gandéra
- 1946 : Macadam by Marcel Blistène
- 1951 : The Sleepwalker by Henri Lavorel and (uncredited) John Berry
- 1953 : It Happened in Paris by Maurice Cammage
- 1954 : Mam'zelle Nitouche by Yves Allégret
- 1954 : The Lost Girl by Jean Gourguet
- 1955 : Les Clandestines by Raoul André
- 1955 : Napoléon by Sacha Guitry
- 1955 : The Babes Make the Law by Raoul André
- 1956 : Si Paris nous était conté by Sacha Guitry
- 1956 : Les Indiscrètes by Raoul André
- 1957 : A Kiss for a Killer by Henri Verneuil
