= Raquel Meller =

Spanish singer

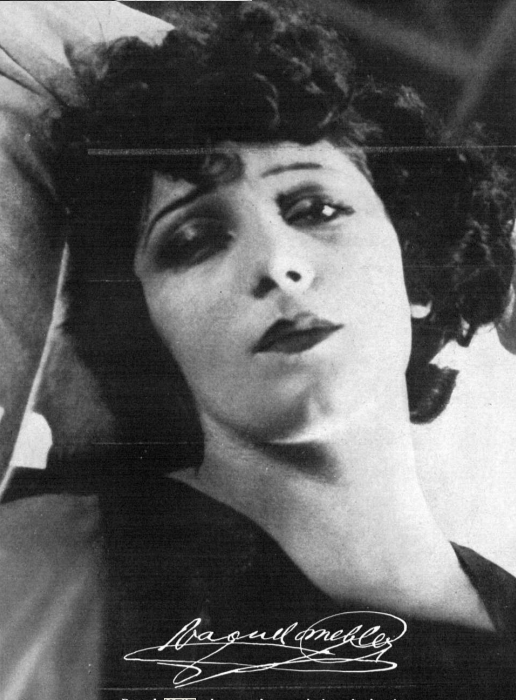
- Raquel Meller in Imperial Violets (1924)
- Born: Francisca Romana Marqués López; 9 March 1888; Tarazona (Zaragoza), Spain
- Died: 26 July 1962 (aged 74); Barcelona, Spain
- Resting place: Montjuïc Cemetery, Barcelona
- Other name: La Bella Rachel
- Occupations: Singer, actress
- Years active: 1908–1936
- Notable work: Imperial Violets, Carmen, songs: "La Violetera", "El relicario"
- Spouse(s): Enrique Gómez Carrillo (m. 1919; div. 1922); Edmond Saiac

Francisca Romana Marqués López (9 March 1888 – 26 July 1962), better known as Raquel Meller, was a Spanish diseuse, cuplé, and tonadilla singer and actress.

She was an international star in the 1920s and 1930s, appearing in several films and touring Europe and the Americas. A vaudeville performer, she sang the original versions of well known songs such as "La Violetera" and "El relicario", both written by José Padilla Sánchez.

== Early life and career ==
Meller was born in Tarazona, Zaragoza province, Aragón in the neighborhood of Cinto. Her father, Telésforo Marqués Ibañez, worked as a blacksmith and her mother, Isabel López Sainz, ran a grocery store.

Her family was one of the oldest in Aragón and were quite wealthy before becoming impoverished during the Carlist Wars. At the age of four, her family moved to Barcelona. Her father died when she was not yet 10 years old and she was placed under the care of her aunt, Sister María del Carmen, an abbess in the convent at Figueras. When her aunt asked her to become a nun, she escaped from the convent with the help of a gardener's ladder.

Meller moved back to Barcelona, where she worked as a seamstress, embroidering the robes of priests and bishops. She sang as she worked, eventually drawing crowds who would stand on the street outside of the dressmaker's shop. Aged 13, she sang at a small cabaret in Valencia. She later appeared in Madrid where she attracted the attention of the King and Queen of Spain.

Painting of Raquel Meller by Joaquín Sorolla (1918)

Around that time she met a famous singer, Marta Oliver, a regular at the clothes shop. Under the tutelage of Oliver, the young singer made her debut in the lounge La Gran Peña in February 1908 under the name La Bella Rachel. Subsequently, she changed her name to Raquel Meller. On 16 September 1911, she made her grand debut at the Teatro Arnau in Barcelona.

In 1917, she met the Guatemalan journalist and diplomat Enrique Gómez Carrillo, whom she married in 1919. As Meller was unable to bear children, the couple adopted. The same year, Meller held her first concerts in Paris (Olympia), Argentina, Uruguay and Chile. Meller secured a divorce from Carrillo in 1922.

In 1919, Meller appeared in her first film, Los arlequines de seda y oro. In the next few years, she would star in her most successful and silent films Violettes impériales (1924) and Carmen (1926). She quickly became popular throughout the Western world and was a darling of the media. Meller was known to wear slender gold bracelets on her right wrist, each representing a significant step in her stage career.

Spanish senator Emilio Junoy alleged that Meller betrayed the spy Mata Hari to the French police in an apparent fit of jealousy over her husband Gómez Carrillo, who had penned a biography of Mata Hari. He denied the rumor, pointing out that Mata Hari was executed in 1917, two years before he married Meller.

The Russian firm Films Albatros conceived of the 1926 film Carmen as a star vehicle for Meller, whose portrayal of the main character was a great success despite being at odds with the vision of director Jacques Feyder. Though she rose to fame singing bawdy cuplés, Meller was known to be prudish. Feyder later recalled how Meller's attitude led to problems while filming:

One morning, in the famous stone bullring of Ronda, pearl of Andalusia, we argued over a kiss she thought inappropriate just when we were about to shoot. Maybe because I felt for the 600 walk-ons waiting under a leaden sun, or maybe it was the sun's effect on me, unusually for me I raised my voice. She raised her arms to the sky, her bracelets tinkling, and cried out: "I don't give a fig about this Mr. Mérimée; anyway, where does he live, this Mérimée? I'll phone him!"

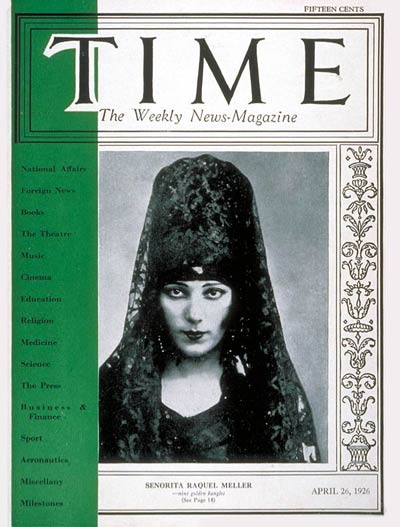
Meller appeared on the 26 April 1926 cover of Time magazine.

Meller was twice booked to perform in the United States but canceled both appearances. In 1926 she finally arrived under contract to theatrical producer E. Ray Goetz, who assured her appearance by requiring her to put up a bond of $100,000. Meller arrived via the SS Leviathan, on which she attempted to book a deluxe suite for her five Pekingese. She visited New York, Philadelphia, Chicago, Boston, Baltimore and Los Angeles.

The sight and sound of Meller were captured for the Fox Movietone sound system, first demonstrated to the public at the Sam H. Harris Theatre in New York City on 21 January 1927. The clip, not quite synchronized, was shown by a movie projector equipped to play sound-on-film, and preceded the feature film What Price Glory? originally released by Fox in November 1926.

On her 1926 visit to Los Angeles, Meller attracted the attention of Charlie Chaplin, who tried to secure her to costar with him. Though he was unsuccessful, Chaplin did incorporate the melody of the song "La Violetera" as a major theme in his 1931 film City Lights.

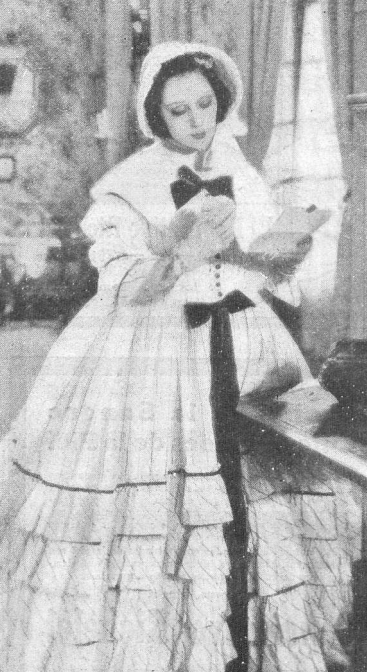
Raquel Meller as Violetta in the 1932 version of Violettes impériales.

In 1932 Meller shot a second version of Violettes impériales for the talkies, and in 1936 began shooting Lola Triana, whose production was interrupted by the Spanish Civil War. In the 1930s Meller lived in France. She was friends with Maurice Chevalier and Sarah Bernhardt, who described Meller as the "greatest actress in Europe—after myself."

In 1937 Meller traveled to Argentina where she remained until 1939. After the Civil War she moved to Barcelona and again achieved popularity with the play of José Padilla's Violetera, and there remarried to French businessman Edmond Saiac.

== Later years ==
Meller faded from public view after the late 1930s. Her legend was rekindled with the films The Last Torch Song (1957) and The Violet Seller (1958), which starred Sara Montiel singing songs popularized by Meller.

Other notable "Queens of Cuplé" were La Chelito and La Fornarina.

== Death and legacy ==
In 1962, Meller suffered a heart attack. She died a month later on 26 July after falling into a coma, aged 74. Her funeral procession in Barcelona the following day numbered 100,000 people. She is interred in the Montjuïc Cemetery in Barcelona.

Meller's hometown of Tarazona houses a permanent museum exhibition for Meller in the Fine Arts Theater of the town hall.

She is featured in an AI generated video found on Youtube, Mambo de Stendhal, by Jorge Pique, composed of animated segments from paintings by various artists, hers being a 1918 painting by Joaquin Sorolla y Bastida, La Bella Raquel (The Beautiful Raquel).

== Filmography ==
- La gitana blanca or Los arlequines de seda y oro (1919), as Gitana Blanca
- Les opprimés (1922) by Henry Roussell, as Conception de la Playa Serra
- Imperial Violets (1924)
- The Night Watch (1925)
- The Promised Land (1925)
- Carmen (1926), as Carmen
- Nocturne (1927)
- La venenosa (1928)
- Imperial Violets (1932)
