= In Old Alsace =

In Old Alsace may refer to:

- In Old Alsace (1933 film), a French drama film
- In Old Alsace (1920 film), a French silent film
