= Maurice de Féraudy =

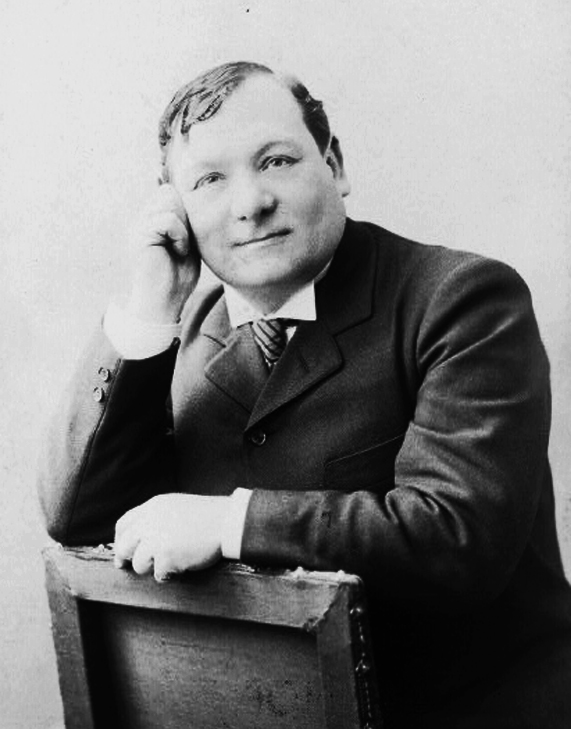
Maurice de Féraudy

Maurice de Féraudy (born in Joinville-le-Pont on December 3, 1859 – died in Paris May 12, 1932) was a French songwriter, stage and film director, and actor at the Comédie-Française. He was the father of actor Jacques de Féraudy.

== Life and career ==
He joined the Théâtre Français in 1880, the company in 1887, and became dean in 1929. His best-known role, which he played 1200 times in thirty years and on which he had a monopoly, is that of Isidore Lechat in Octave Mirbeau's Les affaires sont les affaires (1903). As part of the Comédie-Française in 1922 he toured Quebec, Montreal, and New York, performing two plays by Molière. He has been applauded in the use of comedy, his playing full of cheerfulness.

Féraudy also wrote the lyrics of many songs for Paulette Darty, including the famous "Fascination," taken up by later by Suzy Delair and Diane Dufresne.

== Selected filmography ==
- 1926 : The Clown as circus director James Bunding
- 1929 : Ça aussi!... c'est Paris
- 1928 : Two Timid Souls as Thibaudier
- 1927 : Fleur d'amour as Maître Sourgueil
- 1926 : Lady Harrington as Bréhaut
- 1926 : The Clown as James Bunding
- 1925 : Le Cœur des gueux as Père Larue
- 1923 : The Secret of Polichinelle as Mr. Jouvenel
- 1923 : Cousin Pons (directed by Jacques Robert) as Pons
- 1922 : Crainquebille as Crainquebille
- 1921 : Blanchette as Père Rousset
- 1920 : In Old Alsace
- 1913 : The Gaieties of the Squadron
- 1913 : The Last Pardon
