= André Jorrand =

French composer and organist

André Jorrand (27 November 1921 – 15 December 2007) was a French composer and organist, 1st titular of the Sainte-Croix d'Aubusson church. He was also a magistrate.

== Career ==
Born in Aubusson, Jorrand was a student of Maurice Duruflé, Roland-Manuel (Conservatoire de Paris), Henri Dutilleux (École Normale de Musique de Paris where he obtained his composition and orchestration diplomas) and Arthur Hoérée. In 1978, he established the "Association des Amis de l'orgue d'Aubusson". In 1983, he inaugurated an organ workshop and created the first Aubusson Music Festival in 1988: Musique au cœur de la Tapisserie.

== Works ==
He composed five symphonies, the first three of which had been recorded on CD (Gérard Billaudot Éditeur), five string quartets, a first concerto for organ (State commission) and a second concerto for organ, strings and timpani, a cantata for baritone, mixed choir and organ (commissioned by Radio France): In Paradisum, which was the subject of another CD recording (Skarbo Edition), as well as several instrumental and chamber music scores. He recorded a cassette of Bach's Chorals on the Aubusson organ.

Jorrand died at age 86 in Belvès (Dordogne) on 15 December 2007. He is buried in Ahun (Creuse).
