= Thérèse Kolb =

French actress

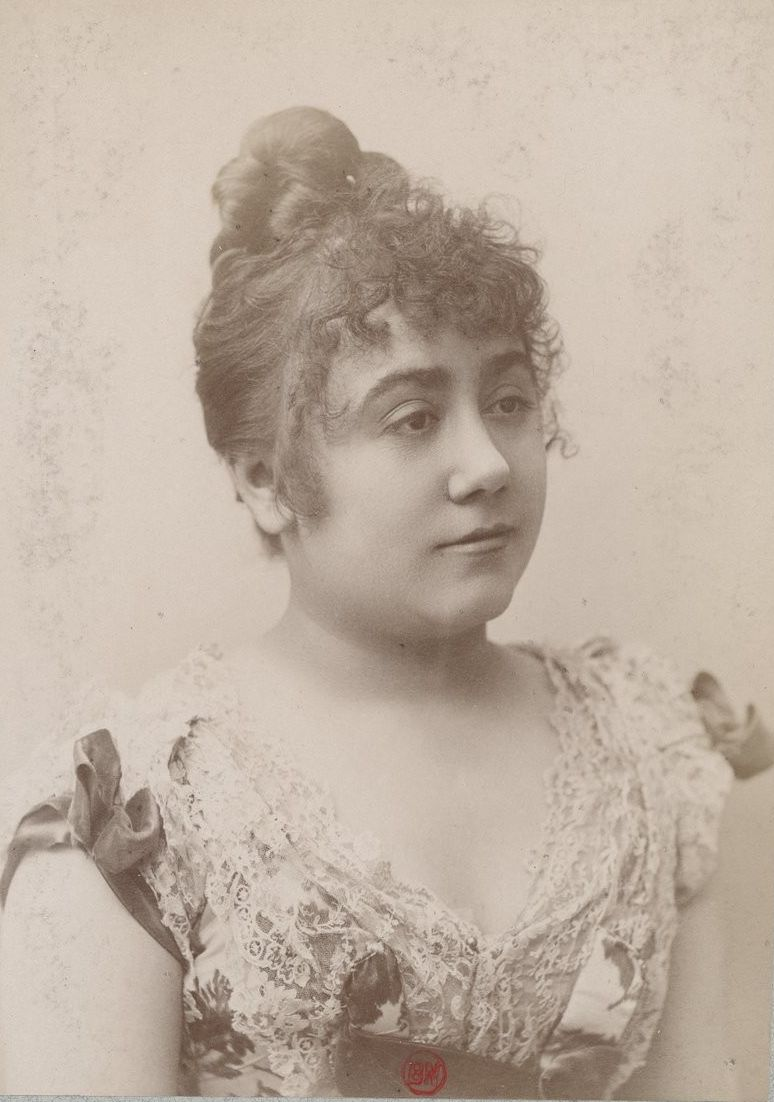
- Born: 19 January 1856; Altkirch, Haut-Rhin, France
- Died: 19 August 1935 (aged 79); Levallois-Perret, Hauts-de-Seine, France
- Occupation: Actress
- Years active: 1912–1935 (film)

Thérèse Kolb (1856–1935) was a French stage and film actress.

== Selected filmography ==
- In Old Alsace (1920)
- Blanchette (1921)
- The Crime of Bouif (1922)
- Jack (1925)
- Yasmina (1927)
- In the Shadow of the Harem (1928)
- The Ladies in the Green Hats (1929)
- The Crime of Sylvestre Bonnard (1929)
- An Ideal Woman (1929)
- Island of Love (1929)
- His Excellency Antonin (1935)

== Bibliography ==
- Goble, Alan. The Complete Index to Literary Sources in Film. Walter de Gruyter, 1999.
