= Arthur Hoérée =

Belgian musicologist, critic, conductor and composer

- Born: 16 April 1897; Brussels, Belgium
- Died: 2 June 1986 (aged 89); Paris, France
- Occupation(s): Musicologist; Critic; Composer; Conductor

Arthur Hoérée (16 April 1897 in Brussels – 2 June 1986 in Paris) was a Belgian musicologist, critic, conductor and composer.

He studied at the Royal Conservatory of Brussels from 1908 to 1912, then at the Conservatoire de Paris.

He was a lecturer and a professor at the École normale de musique, École de la radio à Montrouge and the Sorbonne University.

He wrote music reviews in many French periodicals including the prestigious and famous La Revue Musicale of Henry Prunières.

A specialist in French music, Hoérée has transcribed and produced several works by François Couperin, and he has published two monographs on Albert Roussel (Paris, 1938, 1969).

His activities as a composer extend to film and stage music. He often collaborated with Arthur Honegger. He had the composer and organist André Jorrand as student in his course of instrumentation.

== Film music ==
- 1934: Rapt, by Dimitri Kirsanoff
- 1937: Passeurs d'hommes by René Jayet
- 1938: Liberty by Jean Kemm
- 1938: L'Ange que j'ai vendu by Michel Bernheim
- 1939: L'Or dans la montagne by Max Haufler
- 1939: Musicians of the Sky (Les Musiciens du ciel) by Georges Lacombe
- 1942: À la belle frégate by Albert Valentin
- 1942: Eight Men in a Castle by Richard Pottier
- 1942: Malaria by Jean Gourguet
- 1943: La Main de l'homme by Jean Tedesco and François Ardoin (short film)
- 1945: Dawn Devils by Yves Allégret
- 1945: Enquête du 58 by Jean Tedesco (short film)
- 1946: A Lover's Return (Un revenant) by Christian-Jaque (cast member)
- 1950: Arrière-saison by Dimitri Kirsanoff
- 1951: Les Hommes de l'acier by Jean Tedesco (short film)
- 1955: L'Art d'être heureux by Armand Chartier (documentary)
- 1956: Une tâche difficile by Jean Leduc (short film)

== Works ==
- 1923: Septet (mezzo-Soprano, flute, string quartet and piano), Opus 3
