= Paul Portier (cinematographer) =

French cinematographer

- Occupation: Cinematographer
- Years active: 1923-1944 (film)

Paul Portier was a French cinematographer. He worked on around fifty films during his career.

== Selected filmography ==
- Imperial Violets (1924)
- The Woman in Gold (1926)
- The Song of the Nations (1931)
- A Happy Man (1932)
- Baroud (1932)
- Adémaï in the Middle Ages (1935)
- Wedding Night (1935)
- Count Obligado (1935)
- Wolves Between Them (1936)
- The Novel of Werther (1938)
- Clodoche (1938)
- Three Waltzes (1938)
- There's No Tomorrow (1939)
- Musicians of the Sky (1940)
- The Acrobat (1941)

== Bibliography ==
- Powrie, Phil & Rebillard, Éric. Pierre Batcheff and stardom in 1920s French cinema. Edinburgh University Press, 2009.
