= Scarlet Street =

1945 film by Fritz Lang

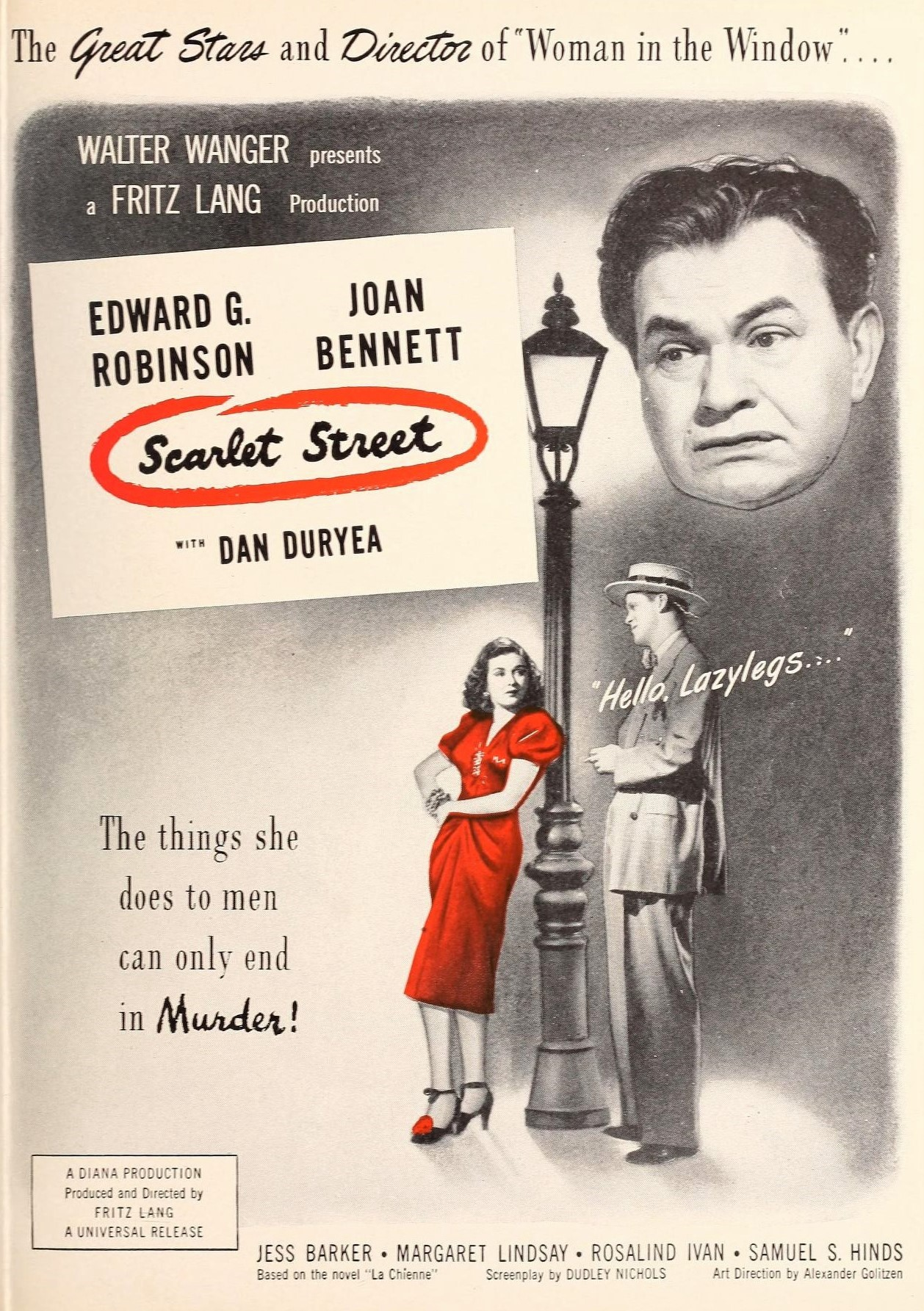
- Theatrical release poster
- Directed by: Fritz Lang
- Screenplay by: Dudley Nichols
- Based on: La Chienne; 1931 novel and play by Georges de La Fouchardière (novel) and André Mouëzy-Éon (play)
- Produced by: Walter Wanger; Fritz Lang
- Starring: Edward G. Robinson; Joan Bennett; Dan Duryea
- Cinematography: Milton R. Krasner
- Edited by: Arthur Hilton
- Music by: Hans J. Salter
- Production companies: Walter Wanger Productions; Fritz Lang Productions; Diana Production Company
- Distributed by: Universal Pictures
- Release date: December 28, 1945 (United States)
- Running time: 102 minutes
- Country: United States
- Language: English
- Budget: $1,202,007
- Box office: $2,948,386

Scarlet Street is a 1945 American film noir directed by Fritz Lang. The screenplay concerns two criminals who take advantage of a middle-aged painter in order to steal his artwork. The film is based on the French novel La Chienne (literally The Bitch) by Georges de La Fouchardière, which had been previously dramatized on stage by André Mouëzy-Éon, and cinematically as La Chienne (1931) by director Jean Renoir.

The principal actors, Edward G. Robinson, Joan Bennett and Dan Duryea, had earlier appeared together in The Woman in the Window (1944), also directed by Lang. Local authorities in New York, Milwaukee, and Atlanta banned Scarlet Street early in 1946 because of its dark plot and themes. The film is in the public domain.

== Plot ==
New York, 1934 – Christopher "Chris" Cross, a late middle-aged cashier for a clothing retailer, is fêted by his employer for 25 years of service. After presenting Chris with a gold watch and kind words, company owner J.J. Hogarth leaves the party and gets into a limousine with his beautiful blonde mistress. Chris muses to a colleague about his desire to be wanted by a young woman like that.

Walking home through Greenwich Village still in his tuxedo, Chris sees Katherine "Kitty" March being attacked by a drunk. Chris flails him with his umbrella, the man slips, and is knocked out by a curb. While Chris dashes off to summon a policeman, the assailant flees.

Chris walks Kitty to her apartment. His wistful remarks about art and formal dinner attire suggest to her that Chris must be a wealthy painter rather than the meek amateur he is. Enamored of Kitty and thinking she feels affection for him, Chris tells her about his loveless marriage. His shrewish wife Adele idolizes her previous husband, a policeman honored for drowning while trying to rescue a suicidal woman.

The disappearing drunk, it turns out, is Johnny, Kitty's boyfriend. Needing funds for a shady business deal, he proposes that Kitty feign romantic interest in Chris to swindle him. Kitty persuades the naive Chris to rent her an apartment, which he can use as an art studio. Chris falls for it, steals $500 in insurance bonds from his wife, and later $1,000 cash from his employer.

Unknown to Chris, Johnny tries selling some of his paintings, leaving them with a street vendor who believes them worth no more than $25. They attract the interest of prominent art critic Damon Janeway, who declares the work original and brilliant. After Johnny persuades Kitty to pretend that she painted them, she charms Janeway with Chris's own views about art. Captivated by the paintings and her, Janeway advances Kitty's career.

Adele sees her husband's paintings, signed "Katherine March", in the window of an exclusive art gallery and accuses Chris of copying March's work. Chris confronts Kitty, who claims that she had sold them because she needed the money. Delighted that his creations are appreciated, he lets her remain the public face of his art. It becomes a huge commercial success, but Chris never receives a dime.

A mysterious man appears at Chris's office to extort money from him. It's Higgins, who'd disappeared after discovering $2,700 in the purse of the woman he had tried to save. Already suspected of taking bribes from speakeasies, he faked his death to escape both his crimes and his marriage to a gargoyle. Chris steals another $200 from the safe for Higgins. Chris plots for Adele to ambush Higgins, delighted that his marriage will be invalidated when Higgins is found alive.

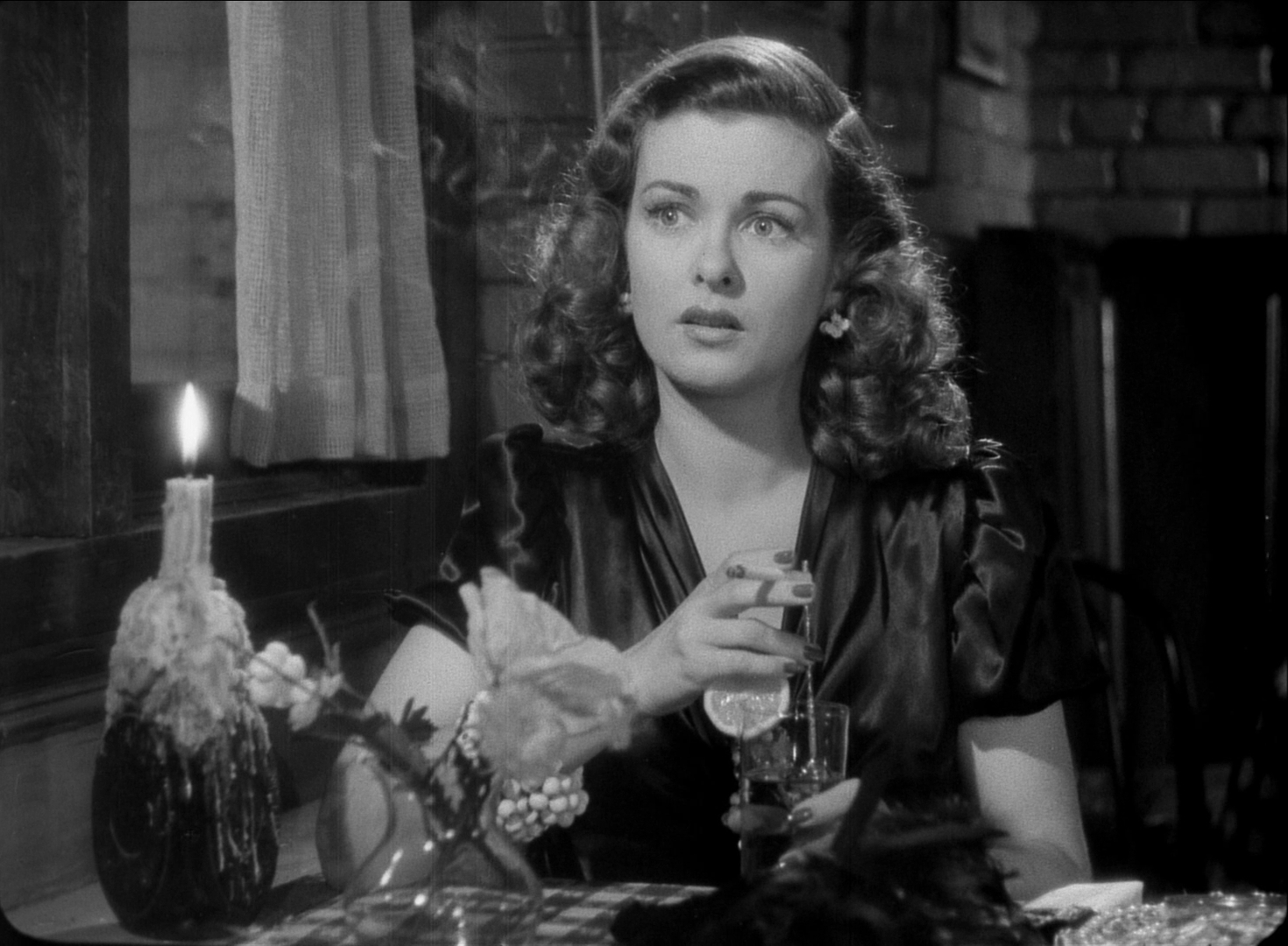
Joan Bennett as Kitty March

Chris goes to see Kitty, believing that he is now free and that she will marry him. He finds Johnny and Kitty in an embrace, confirming his worst fears. However, Chris persists in asking Kitty to marry him. She spurns him for being old and ugly, and laughs in his face. Enraged, he stabs her to death.

The police appear at Chris's office, tipped off by Higgins that Chris has embezzled money from Hogarth, who refuses to press charges, but fires Chris. Johnny is arrested for Kitty's murder.

At the trial, Chris denies painting the pictures, claiming to be an untalented artist. Several witnesses confirm Chris's testimony and attest to Johnny's past misdeeds and bad character. Johnny is convicted and put to death, and Kitty is immortalized as a great talent lost too soon.

Haunted by getting away with murder, Chris attempts to hang himself on the night of Johnny's execution, but is prevented by Good Samaritans. Five years later he is homeless and destitute, with no way of claiming credit for his own paintings. He sees his portrait of Kitty selling for $10,000. Tormented by voices of the ghosts of Kitty and Johnny, Chris wanders New York broken and mad.

== Cast ==
- Edward G. Robinson as Christopher "Chris" Cross
- Joan Bennett as Katherine "Kitty" March
- Dan Duryea as Johnny Prince
- Margaret Lindsay as Millie Ray
- Rosalind Ivan as Adele Cross
- Jess Barker as Damon Janeway
- Charles Kemper as Patch-eye Higgins
- Anita Sharp-Bolster as Mrs. Michaels (as Anita Bolster)
- Samuel S. Hinds as Charles Pringle
- Vladimir Sokoloff as Pop LeJon
- Russell Hicks as J.J. Hogarth
- Arthur Loft as Delarowe

== Production ==
=== Development ===
Scarlet Street

Following the success of The Woman in the Window (1944), director Fritz Lang formed a film company named Diana Productions with producer Walter Wanger and actress Joan Bennett, Wanger's wife and the star of The Woman in the Window. Lang owned 51%, Bennett owned 25%, and the rest was split up among other people.

Lang discovered that Ernst Lubitsch had convinced Paramount Pictures to buy the rights to Jean Renoir's 1931 French film La Chienne, which Lang saw in 1932. According to Lang, "no one [at Paramount] knew what to do with the property." He talked about it with his collaborator, screenwriter Dudley Nichols, and they bought the rights "very cheaply" from Paramount. It was Lang's idea to change the story's setting from Paris to Greenwich Village. In order to avoid copying any scenes, Lang and Nichols never looked at Renoir's version.

Before he wrote the screenplay, Nichols met with Lang, Wanger, and Bennett so all could agree on a new title for the film. Lang remembered, "We talked and talked and could not find what we wanted until I suddenly had a brainwave and said, 'Scarlet Street?' and everyone was enthusiastic." Although he did not know the title's exact meaning, Lang later said that he got it from a passage in the Bible's Book of Revelation that described the Whore of Babylon as "the woman arrayed in purple and scarlet."

=== Casting ===
By March 1945, Lang and Wanger had already signed Edward G. Robinson, Joan Bennett, and Dan Duryea for the leading roles in Scarlet Street.

=== Filming ===
Universal built sets for Scarlet Street on its backlot because Lang was not given permission to film the exterior scenes at Greenwich Village.

Scarlet Street is similar to The Woman in the Window in its themes, cast, crew and characters. Both films were photographed by Milton R. Krasner. Walter Wanger, who produced the film, had earlier produced Lang's 1937 film You Only Live Once.

Though Scarlet Street is considered a film noir classic, along with Lang's earlier film The Woman in the Window, Robinson did not enjoy making Scarlet Street. Frustrated by the thematic similarities between the two films, Robinson briefly mentioned the film in his 1973 autobiography: "I followed with Scarlet Street at Universal and hastened to finish it, so monotonous was the story and the character I played." When he made Scarlet Street, however, Robinson did consider both films to be distinct from each other. In a 1945 newspaper article, reporter Bob Thomas asked him if he had trouble finding different roles. Robinson replied, "No, when you're free-lancing you can look around for all kinds of roles. And that's what I've tried to do. Take pictures like Double Indemnity, Our Vines, Scarlet Street, Woman in the Window—they were all different. And I made each of them at a different studio."

Twelve paintings created for the film by John Decker were sent to the Museum of Modern Art in New York City for exhibition in March 1946.

Broadway producer J. B. Priestley admired the teaming of Robinson, Bennett, and Duryea in The Woman in the Window. Before the release of Scarlet Street, Priestley hired three playwrights to write a play for the three actors. He also wanted Lang to direct the play.

== Reception ==
=== Box office ===
According to Variety, Scarlet Street earned rentals of $2.5 million in the U.S. The film's box-office earnings helped finance Diana Productions' second film, Secret Beyond the Door, starring Joan Bennett.

=== Critical response ===
New York Times film critic Bosley Crowther gave the film a mixed review, writing:

But for those who are looking for drama of a firm and incisive sort, Scarlet Street is not likely to furnish a particularly rare experience. Dudley Nichols wrote the story from a French original, in which it might well have had a stinging and grisly vitality. In this presentation, however, it seems a sluggish and manufactured tale, emerging much more from sheer contrivance than from the passions of the characters involved. And the slight twist of tension which tightens around the principal character is lost in the middle of the picture when he is shelved for a dull stretch of plot. In the role of the love-blighted cashier Edward G. Robinson performs monotonously and with little illumination of an adventurous spirit seeking air. And, as the girl whom he loves, Joan Bennett is static and colorless, completely lacking the malevolence that should flash in her evil role. Only Dan Duryea as her boy friend hits a proper and credible stride, making a vicious and serpentine creature out of a cheap, chiseling tinhorn off the streets.

A review in Variety magazine stated: "Fritz Lang's production and direction ably project the sordid tale of the romance between a milquetoast character and a gold-digging blonde ... Edward G. Robinson is the mild cashier and amateur painter whose love for Joan Bennett leads him to embezzlement, murder and disgrace. Two stars turn in top work to keep the interest high, and Dan Duryea's portrayal of the crafty and crooked opportunist whom Bennett loves is a standout in furthering the melodrama."

Time magazine gave Scarlet Street a negative review, describing the plot as clichéd and with dimwitted, unethical, stock characters.

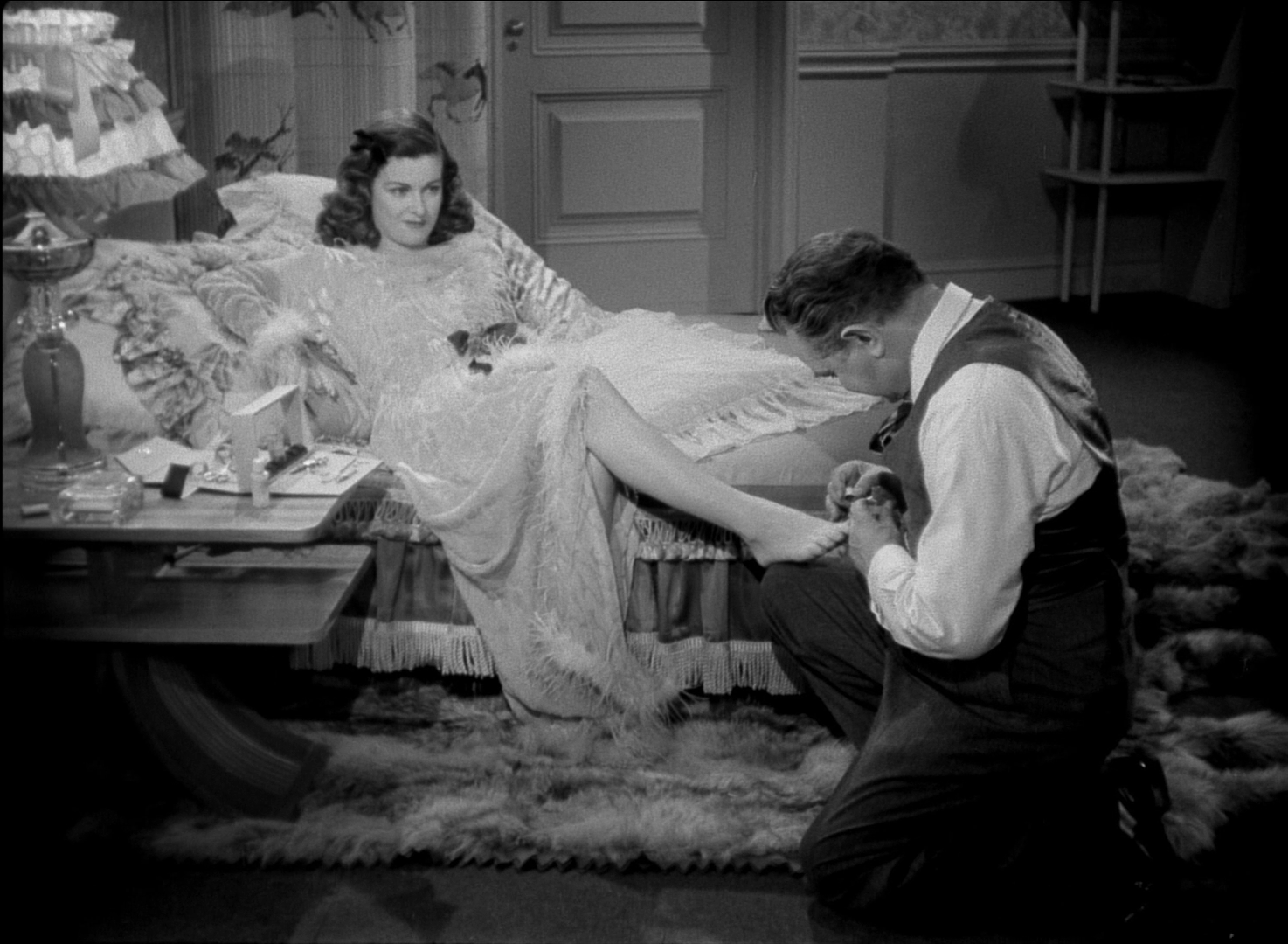
Joan Bennett and Edward G. Robinson

In 1995, Matthew Bernstein wrote in Cinema Journal: "The film is a dense, well-structured film noir and has been analyzed and interpreted numerous times. Some of the earliest interpretations came from censors in three different cities," adding:

On January 4, 1946, the New York State Censor Board banned Scarlet Street entirely, relying on the statute that gave it power to censor films that were "obscene, indecent, immoral, inhuman, sacrilegious" or whose exhibition "would tend to corrupt morals or incite to crime." As if in a chain reaction, one week later the Motion Picture Commission for the city of Milwaukee also banned the film as part of a new policy encouraged by police for "stricter regulation of undesirable films." On February 3 Christina Smith, the city censor of Atlanta, argued that because of "the sordid life it portrayed, the treatment of illicit love, the failure of the characters to receive orthodox punishment from the police, and because the picture would tend to weaken a respect for the law," Scarlet Street was "licentious, profane, obscure and contrary to the good order of the community."... Universal was discouraged from challenging the constitutionality of the censors by the protests of the national religious groups that arose as the Atlanta case went to court.

In 1998, Jonathan Rosenbaum of the Chicago Reader included the film in his unranked list of the best American films not included on the AFI Top 100.

Critic Dennis Schwartz wrote in 2003:

Scarlet Street is a bleak psychological film noir that has the same leading actors as his 1944 film The Woman in the Window. It sets a long-standing trend of a criminal not punished for his crime; this is the first Hollywood film where that happened ... The Edward G. Robinson character is viewed as an ordinary man who is influenced by an evil couple who take advantage of his vulnerability and lead him down an amoral road where he eventually in a passionate moment loses his head and commits murder. Chris's imagination can no longer save him from his dreadful existence, and his complete downfall comes about as the talented artist loses track of reality and his dignity.

On the review aggregation website Rotten Tomatoes, 100% of 17 critics gave the film a positive review, earning it a Fresh score.

Eddie Muller listed it as one of his Top 25 Noir Films.

== See also ==
- Public domain film
- List of American films of 1945
- List of films in the public domain in the United States
