= The Promised Land (1925 film) =

1925 film

- Directed by: Henry Roussel
- Written by: Henry Roussel
- Starring: Pierre Blanchar; Raquel Meller; André Roanne
- Cinematography: Jules Kruger; Raphaël Velle
- Production company: Films Jean de Merly
- Distributed by: Exclusivités Jean de Merly
- Release date: 23 January 1925
- Country: France
- Languages: Silent; French intertitles

The Promised Land (French: La terre promise) is a 1925 French silent film directed by Henry Roussel and starring Pierre Blanchar, Raquel Meller and André Roanne.

The film's sets were designed by the art director Robert Dumesnil.

== Cast ==
- Pierre Blanchar as David
- Raquel Meller as Lia
- André Roanne as André d'Orlinsky, le jeune ingénieur
- Max Maxudian as Moise Sigoulim
- Henriette Moret as La rabbitzine Binnah
- Jean De Sauvejunte as Le rabbin Samuel
- Marie-Louise Vois as Madame Sigoulim
- Albert Bras as Le rabbin Samuel Sigoulim
- Robby Guichard as André
- Pierrette Lugand as Lia
- Jean Rauzena as David
- Uribe (actress) as Esther

== Bibliography ==
- Dayna Oscherwitz & MaryEllen Higgins. The A to Z of French Cinema. Scarecrow Press, 2009.
