= The Acrobat (1941 film) =

- Directed by: Jean Boyer
- Written by: Jean Boyer; Jean Guitton; Yves Mirande
- Starring: Fernandel; Jean Tissier; Thérèse Dorny
- Cinematography: Victor Arménise; Paul Portier
- Edited by: Louisette Hautecoeur
- Music by: Georges Van Parys
- Production company: Les Films Harlé
- Distributed by: CCFC
- Release date: 27 June 1941
- Running time: 90 minutes
- Country: France
- Language: French

The Acrobat (French: L'acrobate) is a 1941 French comedy film directed by Jean Boyer and starring Fernandel, Jean Tissier and Thérèse Dorny.

It was made at the Victorine Studios in Nice, in the Unoccupied Zone of France. The film's art direction was by Paul-Louis Boutié and Guy de Gastyne.

== Cast ==
- Fernandel as Ernest Sauce
- Jean Tissier as Briquet
- Thérèse Dorny as Pauline
- Marcel Carpentier as Le dîneur
- Jean Brochard as Le commissaire
- Paulette Berger as La comtesse de Puypeux
- Lucien Callamand as Le médecin-chef
- Pierre Labry as Dubier
- Fernand Flament as Un infirmier
- Nicolas Amato
- Les Zemgano as Les frères Brindisi
- Charles Dechamps as Le comte de Puypeux
- Gaby Wagner as L'infirmière

== Bibliography ==
- Jacques Lorcey. Fernandel. Éditions Ramsay, 1990.
