= The Crime of Sylvestre Bonnard (film) =

1929 film

- Directed by: André Berthomieu
- Production company: Étoile-Film
- Release date: 1929
- Running time: 96 minutes
- Country: France
- Languages: Silent; French intertitles

The Crime of Sylvestre Bonnard (French: Le crime de Sylvestre Bonnard) is a 1929 French silent drama film directed by André Berthomieu and starring Émile Matrat, Thérèse Kolb and Gina Barbieri. It is based on the 1881 novel The Crime of Sylvestre Bonnard by Anatole France.

== Cast ==
- Émile Matrat as Sylvestre Bonnard
- Thérèse Kolb as Thérèse
- Gina Barbieri as Mlle. Préfière
- Charles Lamy as Le Mouche
- André Laurent as Gélis
- Paul Ollivier as M. de Gabry
- Germaine Noizet as Mme. de Gabry
- Simone Bourday as Jeanne Alexandre
- Julien Bertheau
- Georges Deneubourg
- Gabrielle Fontan
- Jeanne Fusier-Gir

== Bibliography ==
- Goble, Alan. The Complete Index to Literary Sources in Film. Walter de Gruyter, 1999.
