= Félicien Tramel =

French actor

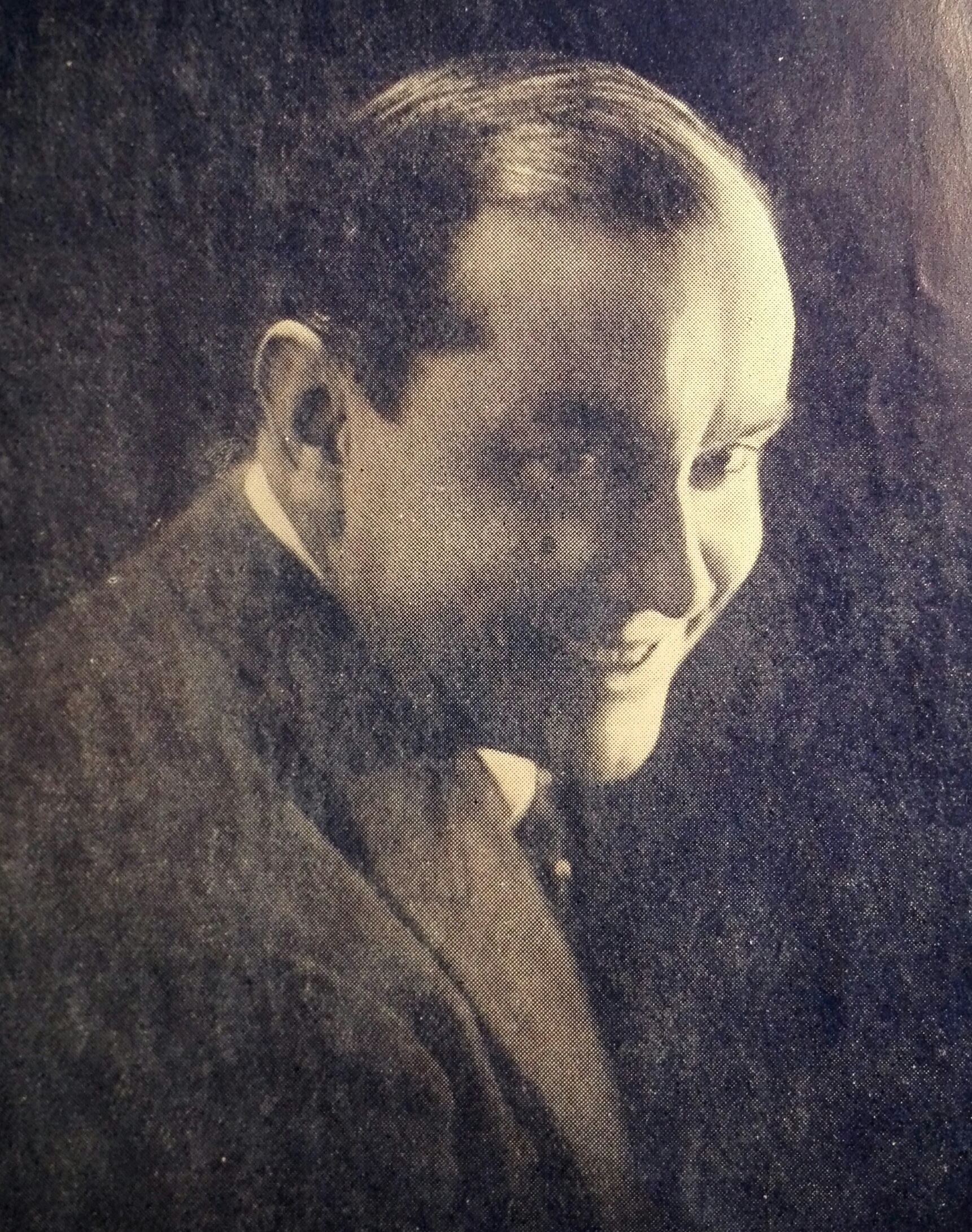
- Antoine Félicien Martel between 1924 and 1926.
- Born: Antoine Félicien Martel; 18 April 1880; Toulon, France
- Died: 11 January 1948 (aged 67); Paris, France
- Other name: Félicien Martel
- Occupation: Actor
- Years active: 1911–1948 (film)

Félicien Tramel, often known simply as Tramel, (1880–1948) was a French film actor.

== Selected filmography ==
- The Crime of Bouif (1922)
- The Crystal Submarine (1927)
- The Mystery of the Eiffel Tower (1928)
- The Best Mistress (1929)
- Bouif's Daughter (1931)
- English As It Is Spoken (1931)
- Cognasse (1932)
- Crainquebille (1933)
- The Crime of Bouif (1933)
- The Porter from Maxim's (1933)
- Crainquebille (1934)
- The Fraudster (1937)
- The Mondesir Heir (1940)
- The Italian Straw Hat (1941)
- The Inevitable Monsieur Dubois (1943)
- A Dog's Life (1943)
- Mistral (1943)
- The Idiot (1946)
- Distress (1946)
- Last Refuge (1947)
- Mirror (1947)
- Are You Sure? (1947)

== Bibliography ==
- Goble, Alan. The Complete Index to Literary Sources in Film. Walter de Gruyter, 1999.
