= Laurent Morléas =

French actor

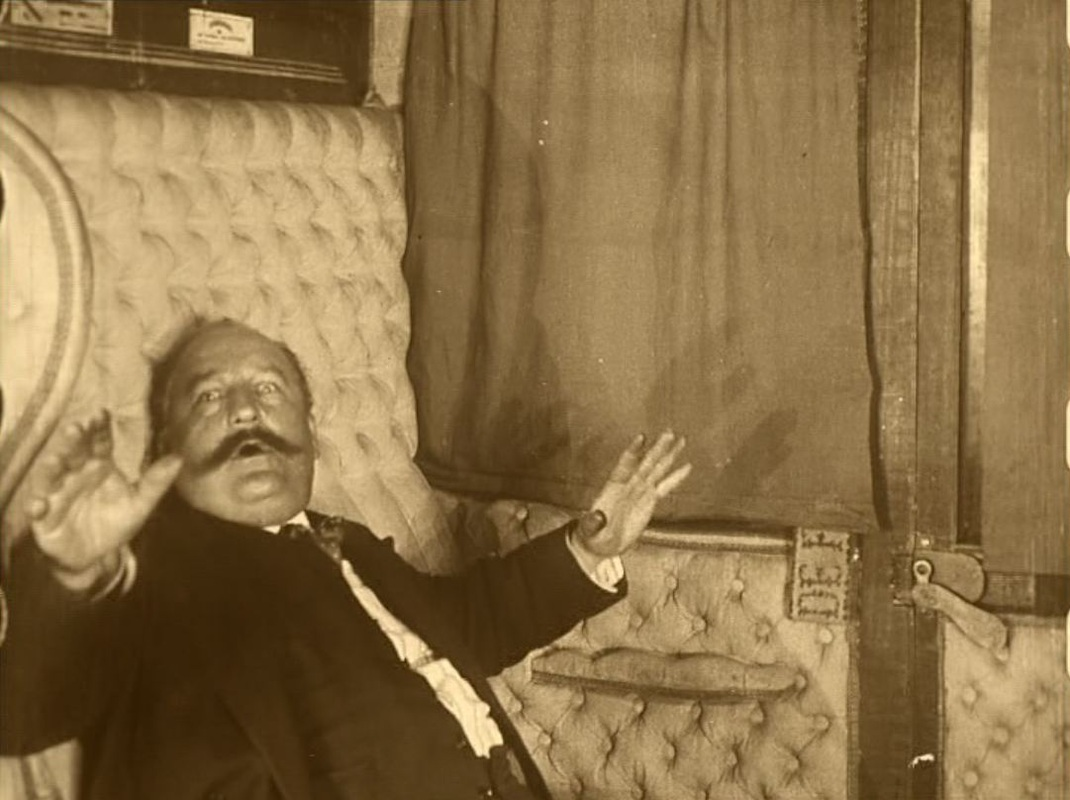
- Morléas in 1913
- Born: Laurent Trambouze; 19 May 1879; Lyon, France
- Died: 18 June 1940 (aged 61); La Chapelle-d'Angillon, France
- Occupation: Actor
- Years active: 1902–1937

Laurent Morléas (born Laurent Trambouze; 19 May 1879 – 18 June 1940) was a French actor. He was active in theatre and film between 1902 and 1937. He died in a German bombing raid during the Second World War.

== Selected filmography ==
- Les Vampires (1915–1916)
- Barrabas (1920)
- Koenigsmark (1923)
- Imperial Violets (1924)
- The Three Muskeeters (1932)
