= The Night Watch (1925 film) =

1925 film

- Directed by: Marcel Silver
- Written by: Pierre Benoît
- Starring: Suzanne Bianchetti; Vladimir Gajdarov; Raquel Meller
- Cinematography: Alphonse Gibory; Henri Gondois
- Music by: Charles Silver
- Production company: International Standard Film
- Distributed by: Mappemonde Film
- Release date: 20 November 1925
- Country: France
- Languages: Silent; French intertitles

The Night Watch (French: La ronde de nuit) is a 1925 French drama film directed by Marcel Silver and starring Suzanne Bianchetti, Vladimir Gajdarov and Raquel Meller.

The film's sets were designed by the art director Robert Mallet-Stevens.

== Cast ==
In alphabetical order

- Jacques Arnna as Duc Procope
- Léon Bary as Stello
- Suzanne Bianchetti as Princesse Hedwig
- Albert Bras as Baron Tobel
- Gilbert Dalleu as Wolfgang
- Vladimir Gajdarov as Prince Laszlo
- Raquel Meller as Princesse Stefania
- Marie-Louise Vois as Duchesse de Windischgrätz

== Bibliography ==
- David Henry Slavin. Colonial Cinema and Imperial France, 1919–1939: White Blind Spots, Male Fantasies, Settler Myths. JHU Press, 2001.
