= The Last Pardon =

1913 film

- Directed by: Maurice Tourneur
- Written by: Gyp
- Production company: Société Française des Films Éclair
- Release date: 1913
- Country: France
- Languages: Silent; French intertitles

The Last Pardon (French: Le dernier pardon) is a 1913 French silent comedy film directed by Maurice Tourneur.

== Cast ==
- Maurice de Féraudy
- Charles Krauss
- Fernande Petit
- Polaire
- Henry Roussel
- Mme. Van Doren

== Bibliography ==
- Waldman, Harry. Maurice Tourneur: The Life and Films. McFarland, 2001.
