= Thérèse Dorny =

French actress (1891–1976)

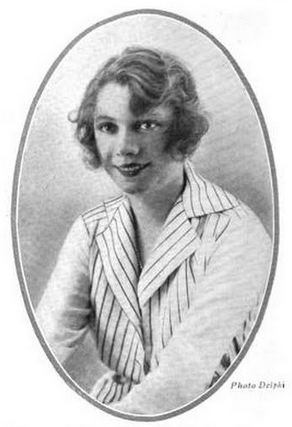
- Thérèse Dorny, from a 1921 publication
- Born: Thérèse Jeanne Longo-Dorni; 18 September 1891; Paris, Ile-de-France, French Third Republic
- Died: 14 March 1976 (aged 84); Saint-Tropez, Var, France
- Other names: Thérèse Jeanne Dunoyer de Segonzac; Thérèse-Jeanne Longo
- Years active: 1913–1958
- Spouse: André Dunoyer de Segonzac (m. 1964; died 1974)

Thérèse Dorny (born Thérèse Jeanne Longo-Dorni; 18 September 1891 – 14 March 1976) was a French film and stage actress.

== Biography ==
Thérèse Jeanne Longo-Dorni was born on 18 September 1891 in Paris, Île-de-France, France, the only child to Gaudence Jean Baptiste Marie Longo-Dorni (born 1859) and Marie Antonia Longo-Dorni (née Junghanss, born 1865).

She began her career as a stage actress in 1913, and made her debut as a film actress in the 1930 film The Sweetness of Loving. She was best known for her roles in Cognasse (1932) and Les Diaboliques (1955).

Dorny married the French painter and graphic artist André Dunoyer de Segonzac on 19 December 1964 in Viroflay, Île-de-France, France, who she remained with until his death in 1974.

Dorny died on 14 March 1976 in Saint-Tropez, Var, France.

== Filmography ==
- 1930: The Sweetness of Loving (by René Hervil) – Lorette
- 1932: Cognasse (by Louis Mercanton) – Mme. Cognasse
- 1933: Knock (by Roger Goupillières and Louis Jouvet) – La dame en violet
- 1933: Ciboulette (by Claude Autant-Lara) – Zénobie
- 1935: Monsieur Sans-Gêne (by Karl Anton) – La féministe
- 1935: The Mascot (by Léon Mathot) – Dame Turlurette
- 1935: Divine (by Max Ophüls) – La Poison
- 1935: The Hortensia Sisters (by René Guissart) – Madame Hormalin
- 1936: Passé à vendre (by René Pujol) – Marthe Dupont
- 1936: Un by la légion (by Christian Jaque) – Antoinette Espitalion
- 1936: Ménilmontant (by René Guissart) – Toinon
- 1937: À nous deux madame la vie (by Yves Mirande and René Guissart) – La femme de Toto la Vache
- 1937: La cantinier by la coloniale (by Henry Wulschleger) – Madame Piéchu
- 1937: Abus by confiance (by Henri Decoin) – La logeuse
- 1938: Katia (by Maurice Tourneur) – La baronne
- 1938: Prince of My Heart (by Jacques Daniel-Norman) – Isabelle Gatemouille
- 1938: Retour à l'aube (by Henri Decoin) – La directrice de la maison de couture
- 1938: Visages de femmes (by René Guissart) – Verdurette
- 1939: Whirlwind of Paris (by Henri Diamant-Berger) – (uncredited)
- 1941: The Acrobat (by Jean Boyer) – Pauline
- 1941: The Italian Straw Hat (by Maurice Cammage) – La baronne
- 1942: Les Petits Riens (by Raymond Leboursier) – L'habilleuse
- 1943: A Dog's Life (by Maurice Cammage) – Léocadie
- 1943: Don't Shout It from the Rooftops (by Jacques Daniel-Norman) – Madame Noblet
- 1943: Une femme disparaît (by Jacques Feyder) – Lucie
- 1943: Behold Beatrice (or Ainsi va la vie) (by Jean by Marguenat) – Tante Hermance
- 1943: Death No Longer Awaits (by Jean Tarride) – Mademoiselle Verdelier
- 1945: La boîte aux rêves (by Yves Allégret) – Une femme (uncredited)
- 1946: La Fille du diable (by Henri Decoin) – Tante Hortense / Aunt Hortense
- 1946: Mystery Trip (by Pierre Prévert) – Mademoiselle Roberta
- 1947: Troisième cheminée à droite (by Jean Mineur) – La concierge
- 1949: The Legend of Faust (by Carmine Gallone) – Marta
- 1949: La Belle Meunière (by Marcel Pagnol)
- 1950: Uniformes et grandes manoeuvres (by René Le Hénaff) – Solange Duroc
- 1950: Tire au flanc (by Fernand Rivers) – Mme Blandin d'Ombelles
- 1951: The Passage of Venus (by Maurice Gleize) – Zoé Chantoiseau
- 1953: The Beauty of Cadiz (by Raymond Bernard) – Blanche – l'habilleuse
- 1954: Adam Is Eve (by René Gaveau) – Mme Beaumont
- 1955: Les Diaboliques (by Henri-Georges Clouzot) – Mme. Herboux
- 1955: On ne badine pas avec l'amour (by Jean Desailly)
- 1956: Mitsou (by Jacqueline Audry) – Madame Papier – l'habilleuse
- 1959: Oh ! Qué mambo (by John Berry) – La belle-mère (final film role)
