= Charles Ford (film historian) =

Belgian and French writer, film historian, journalist (1908–1989)

Charles Marie Joseph Ford (14 May, 1908 – 4 December, 1989) was a Belgian and French film historian, writer, and journalist.

Charles Ford was born in Antwerp, Belgium.

Charles Ford died in Paris, France

== Works ==
- Histoire encyclopédique du cinéma (with René Jeanne, 1947) (Note: Histoire encyclopédique du cinéma, vol. I) (Note: Histoire encyclopédique du cinéma, Vol IV)
- Le cinéma au service de la foi [Cinema in the service of faith] (1954)
- Histoire populaire du cinéma (1955)
- Histoire illustrée du cinéma (with René Jeanne, 1966)
- Paris vu par le Cinéma [Paris as seen through cinema] (with René Jeanne, 1969)
- Femmes cinéastes ou le triomphe de la volonté (1972)
- Dictionnaire des cinéastes contemporains (1974)
- Histoire moderne du cinéma (1987)
- Polish Film: A Twentieth Century History (with Robert Hammond, 2005) (Note: Polish Film: A Twentieth Century History)

== Awards ==
- 1954: Prix Juteau-Duvigneaux for Le cinéma au service de la foi
- 1970: Marie-Eugène-Simon-Henri-Martin Prize of the French Academy (with René Jeanne) for their book Paris vu par le Cinéma
