= The Golden Abyss =

1927 film directed by Mario Bonnard

- Austrian poster
- Directed by: Mario Bonnard
- Written by: André Armandy (novel); Franz Schulz
- Starring: Liane Haid; André Roanne; Hans Albers
- Cinematography: Raoul Aubourdier; Mutz Greenbaum; Emil Schünemann
- Music by: Felix Bartsch
- Production company: Greenbaum-Film
- Distributed by: Filmhaus Bruckmann
- Release date: 27 September 1927
- Running time: 89 minutes
- Country: Germany
- Languages: Silent; German intertitles

The Golden Abyss (German: Der goldene Abgrund) is a 1927 German silent drama film directed by Mario Bonnard and starring Liane Haid, André Roanne and Hans Albers. It was shot at the Staaken Studios in Berlin. The film's sets were designed by the art directors Andrej Andrejew and Alexander Ferenczy.

== Cast ==
- Liane Haid as Jola und Claire
- André Roanne as Jean Hudin
- Claude Mérelle as Dolores Coreto
- Hugo Werner-Kahle as Dr. Codrus
- Hans Albers as Baron Armand
- Robert Leffler as Pater Ambrosius, der Missionar
- Raimondo Van Riel as Ein Sträflingsanführer
- Ekkehard Arendt as Claires Freund
- Oreste Bilancia

== Bibliography ==
- Hans-Michael Bock and Tim Bergfelder. The Concise Cinegraph: An Encyclopedia of German Cinema. Berghahn Books.
