= André Dunoyer de Segonzac =

French painter (1884–1974)

- Born: Albert André Marie Dunoyer de Segonzac; 7 July 1884; Boussy-Saint-Antoine, France
- Died: 17 September 1974 (aged 90); Paris, France
- Resting place: Cemetery of Saint-Tropez
- Spouse: Thérèse Dorny
- Relatives: Jean-Charles Persil (great-grandfather)

André Dunoyer de Segonzac (7 July 1884 – 17 September 1974) was a French painter and graphic artist.

== Biography ==
André Dunoyer de Segonzac, 1911, Les Boxeurs (The Boxers), location unknown, presumed destroyed by the artist. Black and white reproduction in Huntly Carter, The new spirit in drama & art, 1913

Albert André Marie Dunoyer de Segonzac was born on 7 July 1884 in Boussy-Saint-Antoine to Louis Dunoyer de Segonzac, a naval officer, and Clémence Amélie Persil. Through his father Dunoyer de Segonzac was a member of the Dunoyer de Segonzac family, and was the maternal grand-grandson of the politician Jean-Charles Persil.

Dunoyer de Segonzac spent his childhood in Boussy-Saint-Antoine and in Paris. His parents wanted him to attend the military academy of Saint-Cyr but, recognizing his strong interest in drawing, they agreed to his enrollment at the Free Academy of Luc-Olivier Merson. Merson's academic style of instruction did not suit Segonzac, however, and, following a period of military service, he studied at the Académie de La Palette, whose staff included Jacques Émile Blanche (he would later teach at La Palette with Jean Metzinger and Henri Le Fauconnier). Soon giving this up in favor of an independent course, free of any masters, he later cited 1906 as the starting date of his artistic career.

His first submission to the Salon d'Automne was in 1908; the next year he exhibited at the Salon des Indépendants, and for the next several years he exhibited regularly at both. In the early 1910s he became a member of Section d'Or. He was one of the modernists included in the Armory Show that opened in New York in 1913, with subsequent showings in Chicago and Boston.

In 1914, the year of his first solo exhibition (at the Galerie Levesque in Paris), Segonzac was drafted for military service in World War I. He saw combat in the region of Nancy and at Bois-Le-Prêtre, before being transferred to the pioneering camouflage section led by Lucien-Victor Guirand de Scévola. Between 1914 and 1918 he published and exhibited a number of war drawings, and by war's end he had earned the Croix de Guerre. He drew on his military experiences—and learned etching in 1919—in order to illustrate The Wooden Crosses by Roland Dorgelès (published in 1921). Segonzac found etching to be a congenial medium to his spontaneous drawing style, and by the end of his life he had produced some 1600 plates. His work was also part of the art competitions at the 1932 Summer Olympics and the 1948 Summer Olympics.

In 1947, he published his suite of etchings illustrating the Georgics of Virgil. In the judgement of Anne Distel, chief curator of the Musée d'Orsay, "The technical perfection and the nobility of the tone, which carried the cachet of the original, but was imbued throughout with an unfailing lyricism, make this work Segonzac's masterpiece. It must be included in a list of the most beautifully illustrated books of [the 20th] century."

The gossamer quality of his etchings stood in contrast to the thickly painted surfaces and generally somber color of his oil paintings, which reflected his admiration for Courbet and Cézanne. His subjects include landscapes, still lifes, and nudes. He influenced other artists like Samuel Peploe. Prolific until the very end of his life as a painter in oils and watercolor, and as a printmaker.

== Personal life ==
He was married to the actress Thérèse Dorny.

On 17 September Segonzac died in Paris, aged 90.

== Collections ==
Segonzac's work is held in the permanent collections of several museums worldwide, including the British Museum, the Toledo Museum of Art, the National Portrait Gallery, the Fine Arts Museums of San Francisco, the University of Michigan Museum of Art, the Fred Jones Jr. Museum of Art, the National Gallery of Denmark, the Metropolitan Museum of Art, the Tate, the Philadelphia Museum of Art, the Museum of Modern Art, the Hiroshima Museum of Art, the Hammer Museum, the Nelson-Atkins Museum of Art, the Eskenazi Museum of Art, the Memphis Brooks Museum of Art, the Fogg Art Museum, the National Museum of Western Art, the Clark Art Institute, the Hood Museum of Art, the Detroit Institute of Arts, and the Museum of Fine Arts, Boston.

== Illustrations ==
- Jean Cocteau, Bertrand Guégan (1892–1943); L'almanach de Cocagne pour l'an 1920-1922, Dédié aux vrais Gourmands Et aux Francs Buveurs
