= The Crime of Bouif (1922 film) =

1922 film

- Directed by: Henri Pouctal
- Based on: The Crime of Bouif by André Mouëzy-Éon and Georges de La Fouchardière
- Produced by: Henri Pouctal
- Starring: Félicien Tramel; Henri Gouget; Thérèse Kolb
- Release date: 20 January 1922
- Running time: 73 minutes
- Country: France
- Languages: Silent; French intertitles

The Crime of Bouif (French: Le crime du Bouif) is a 1922 French silent comedy drama film, directed by Henri Pouctal, and starring Félicien Tramel, Henri Gouget and Thérèse Kolb. It is an adaptation of the 1921 play of the same title by André Mouëzy-Éon and Georges de La Fouchardière which Tramel had appeared in. It was subsequently remade as a 1933 sound film The Crime of Bouif (1933), with Tramel again reprising the title role.

== Cast ==
- Félicien Tramel as Bicard dit Le Bouif
- Henri Gouget as Goldmayer
- Paul Gerbault as Docteur Boudon
- Thérèse Kolb as Madame Bicard
- Henriette Delannoy as Madame Hexam
- Pierre Labry as Hexam
- Charles Lamy as Chennevert
- Jeanne Saint-Bonnet as Estelle Bicard

== Bibliography ==
- Goble, Alan. The Complete Index to Literary Sources in Film. Walter de Gruyter, 1999.
- Rège, Philippe. Encyclopedia of French Film Directors, Volume 1. Scarecrow Press, 2009.
