= The Crime of Sylvestre Bonnard =

1881 novel by Anatole France

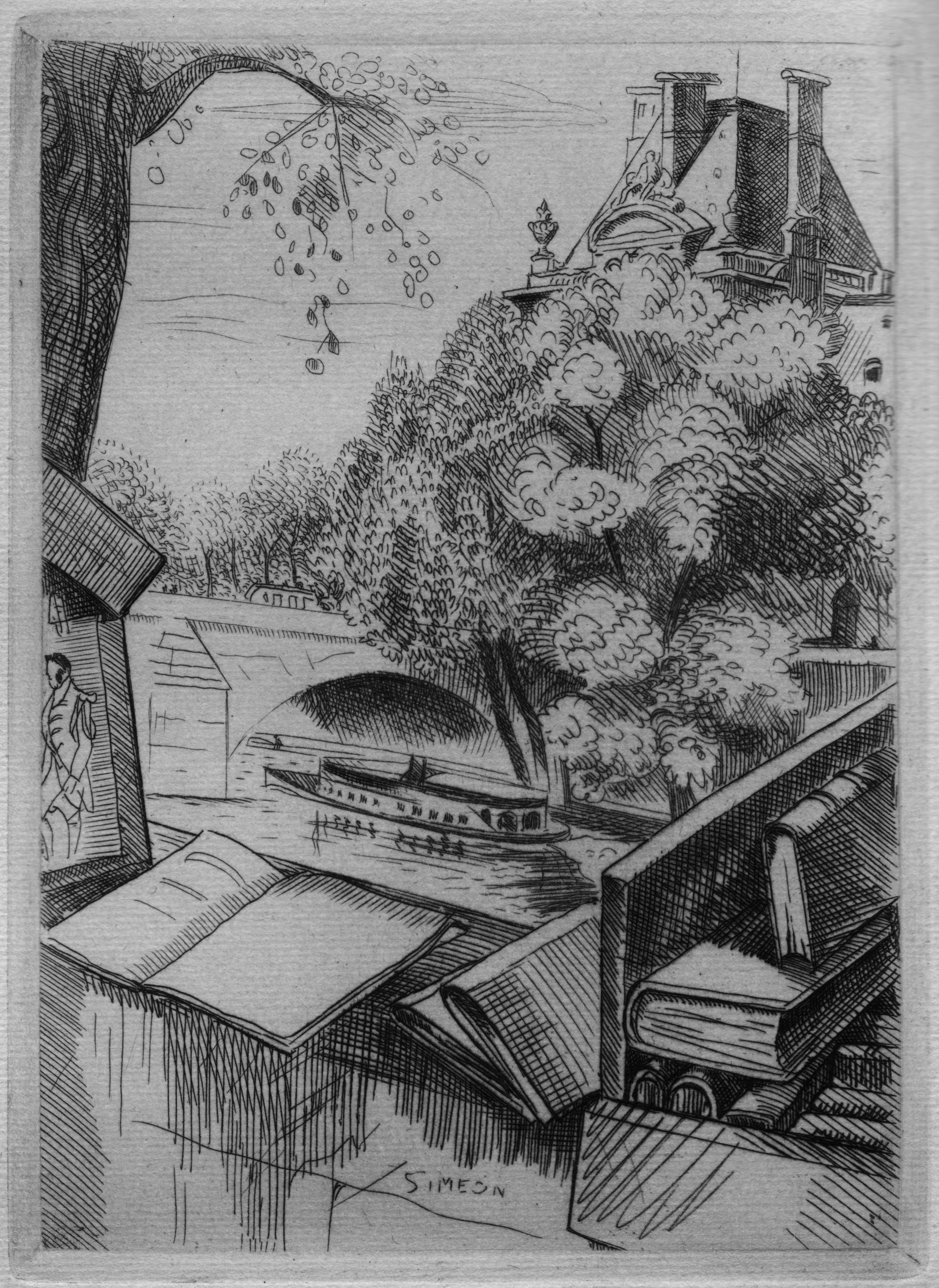
- Frontispiece by Fernand Siméon
- Author: Anatole France
- Original title: Le Crime de Sylvestre Bonnard
- Language: French
- Published: 1881
- Publication place: France
- Original text: Le Crime de Sylvestre Bonnard at French Wikisource

The Crime of Sylvestre Bonnard (French: Le Crime de Sylvestre Bonnard) is the first novel by Anatole France, published in 1881. With this, one of his first prose works, he made himself known as a novelist; he had been primarily known as a poet affiliated with Parnassianism because of his Poèmes dorés, which imitated that verse style. The novel received the Académie française prize.

In 1929 it was adapted into a French silent film of the same title.

== Summary ==
The novel contains two stories, both related through the diary entry of Sylvestre Bonnard, a member of the Institut de France, a historian and philologist who lives among books. In the first part, "La Buche", he seeks, in Sicily and Paris, a precious manuscript of the French version of the Golden Legend, which he eventually obtains. In the second, "Jeanne Alexandre", he meets by chance a young girl named Jeanne, the granddaughter of a woman he once loved. (Before the revision of 1902, Jeanne was a daughter and not a granddaughter.) To protect the child from her abusive guardian Maître Mouche, and from her employer Mme. Préfère (who herself has designs on Bonnard), Bonnard in effect kidnaps her, and she ends up marrying Henri Gelis, one of Bonnard's students.

== Character ==
Bonnard, the protagonist, is modeled on the author. Although Bonnard is an old intellectual who spends most of his time reading, he is otherwise very like the author at the time the book was written. France portrays Bonnard as naïve and candid, a passive gentle watcher without competence in the real world. Bonnard is not simple or unmoved, but reluctant to involve himself. France, like his protagonist Bonnard, spent much of his time reading, with few friends and few encounters with reality. Yet he was wise, discussing and writing about the problems of existence.

== Irony ==
The novel, told as diary entries, has been claimed to be written in the style of O. Henry and Guy de Maupassant, romantic and realist writers respectively, whose stories often have ironic endings. France was known as an ironist. In The Crime of Sylvestre Bonnard, the chief irony is that which is considered a crime. The protagonist considers the "crime" to be that he keeps some of the books he was going to sell for Jeanne's dowry. But the reader understands Bonnard's crime to be that he abducts the girl from her abusive guardian, thus rescuing her. To call a rescuer a criminal is ironic. Janko Lavrin has claimed that it was not so much that France was ironic, but that he was detached. He claimed he had a free mind and could "accept the relativity of things".

Edwin Dargan compared France's humor in the book to that of Henry Fielding, Laurence Sterne and Charles Dickens; Dickens's Pickwick and Bardell are similar to Mlle. Préfère's pursuit of Bonnard.

== Criticism ==
Dargan suggests that the second story is only loosely related to the first, "La Buche". In the first edition, they were even less related before France revised the novel in 1902. He describes "La Buche" as an anecdote and "Jeanne Alexandre" as an episode. Frank Magill feels that the "novel" is little more than a character study of Bonnard.
