= Isidore Lechat =

- First appearance: Business is business (1903)
- Created by: Octave Mirbeau

In-universe information
- Nickname: Lechat-Tigre
- Species: Human
- Gender: Male
- Occupation: Businessman
- Spouse: Mme Lechat
- Children: Xavier and Germaine
- Nationality: French

Isidore Lechat is a fictional character and the main protagonist of the play Les affaires sont les affaires (Business is business) (1903) by French writer Octave Mirbeau.

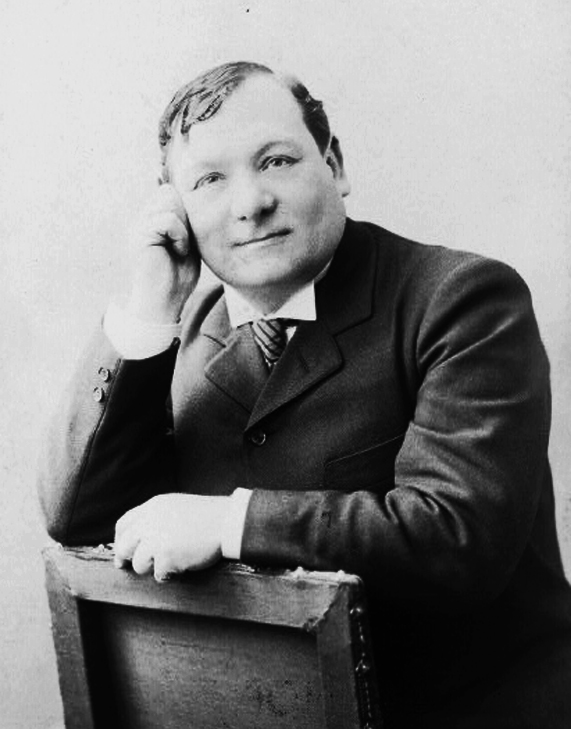
Maurice de Féraudy, who created the part of Isidore Lechat in 1903

== A businessman ==
Isidore Lechat, nicknamed "Lechat-Tigre", is a ruthless businessman, a predator without any scruples. Rather than specializing in just one branch of trade, industry or finance, he has invested in everything, for instance into the press, modern agriculture and electricity. Due to his extortion, he becomes rich and powerful in the French society of the French Third Republic. Because of the newspaper that he created and his 50 million francs, he seems untouchable and above the law, which is made only for the poor. Lechat enjoys impunity from both the government and the Catholic Church. For the playwright, Isidore Lechat is the product of an era of economic upheaval and global expansion of capitalism and the first phase of economic imperialism.

However, Octave Mirbeau recognizes that this predator, who sows misery everywhere around him, is an "idealist" in his own way and that his projects are potentially progressive, because they contribute to the development of productive forces. The old aristocracy, embodied in the play by the old Marquis de Porcellet, is nothing but a parasitic class.

== A two faced man ==
Cynical and vulgar, Isidore Lechat is a nouveau riche who hides his extraordinary capacity to rob his victims behind the silver tongue of a bon vivant and disarms them. Nevertheless, he is totally blind in his private life; he does not realize that his wife is lost and unhappy, his beloved son Xavier is a slacker, his daughter Germaine is disgusted and is having love affair right in front of him. He also does not notice that Germaine prepares to flee his golden chains, rejecting Lechat's dreams of a good marriage.

Furthermore, the libido dominandi of Lechat is powerless over love and death: his son dies in an automobile accident, and her daughter goes away with her lover, Lucien Garraud. In addition, his formerly submissive wife becomes no longer afraid of him and judges him severely. Defeated, oppressed and humiliated, Lechat finds the strength to recover his self-control in order to seal a profitable deal, crushing the two swindlers who wanted to take advantage of his grief and fool him: business is business...

In spite of the disgust inspired by his cynicism and vulgarity, Isidore Lechat can also rouse a kind of admiration for his energy and his clearness in business, and even inspire pity when he loses his daughter, his son and his submissive wife in a single day.
