= Cognasse =

1932 film directed by Louis Mercanton

- Directed by: Louis Mercanton
- Written by: Georges Rip
- Starring: Félicien Tramel; Thérèse Dorny; Marguerite Moreno
- Cinematography: Otto Heller
- Edited by: Ella Ensink
- Music by: Raoul Moretti
- Production company: Les Studios Paramount
- Distributed by: Les Films Paramount
- Release date: 1 September 1932
- Running time: 95 minutes
- Country: France
- Language: French

Cognasse is a 1932 French comedy film directed by Louis Mercanton and starring Félicien Tramel, Thérèse Dorny and Marguerite Moreno. The film was made at the Joinville Studios by the French subsidiary of Paramount Pictures.

== Cast ==
- Félicien Tramel as Cognasse
- Thérèse Dorny as Mme. Cognasse
- Marguerite Moreno as Nurse
- André Roanne as Paul Fargeot
- Christiane Tourneur as Ginette Cognasse
- Gaston Mauger as Mingret
- Marcelle Monthil
- Christiane Delyne
- Germaine Michel
- Yvonne Ducos]
- Josèphe Evelys
- Micheline Bernard
- Pierre Moreno]
- Maurice Rémy
- Jean Rozenberg
- Paul Faivre
- Georgé
- Jean Mercanton
- Henri Jullien
- Eugène Stuber
- Georges Rip
- Robert Bossis
- Robert Darthez

== Bibliography ==
- Crisp, Colin. Genre, Myth and Convention in the French Cinema, 1929-1939. Indiana University Press, 2002.
