= The Crime of Bouif (1933 film) =

1933 film

- Directed by: André Berthomieu
- Based on: The Crime of Bouif by André Mouëzy-Éon and Georges de La Fouchardière
- Produced by: Emile Dereumaux
- Starring: Félicien Tramel; Jeanne Helbling; Mady Berry
- Cinematography: Jacques Montéran
- Music by: Georges Van Parys
- Production company: Pathé Consortium Cinéma
- Distributed by: Les Films de France
- Release date: 27 January 1933
- Running time: 85 minutes
- Country: France
- Language: French

The Crime of Bouif (French: Le crime du Bouif) is a 1933 French comedy drama film directed by André Berthomieu and starring Félicien Tramel, Jeanne Helbling and Mady Berry. It was based on the 1921 play of the same title by André Mouëzy-Éon and Georges de La Fouchardière. The film's sets were designed by the art director Hugues Laurent. Tramel had previously appeared in a 1922 silent version of the story.

== Cast ==
- Félicien Tramel as Bicard dit Le Bouif
- Jeanne Helbling as Mrs. Hexam
- Mady Berry as Mme Bicard
- Louis Baron fils as Le juge Chennevert
- Marcel Vibert as Le docteur Bourdon
- Alfred Argus as Roggers
- Albert Broquin as Un agent
- Emile Dellys as Un agent de la sûreté
- Jean Diéner as Le procureur
- Geo Flandre as Spêncer
- Paul Franceschi as Goldenmayer
- Henry Houry as Mr. Hexam
- Geo Laby as Lafrite
- Fred Marche as Bidasse
- Teddy Parent as Auvent
- Ketty Pierson as Gaby
- Henri Trévoux as Le commissaire
- Paul Velsa as L'avocat

== Bibliography ==
- Bessy, Maurice & Chirat, Raymond. Histoire du cinéma français: 1929-1934. Pygmalion, 1988.
- Crisp, Colin. Genre, Myth and Convention in the French Cinema, 1929-1939. Indiana University Press, 2002.
- Goble, Alan. The Complete Index to Literary Sources in Film. Walter de Gruyter, 1999.
- Rège, Philippe. Encyclopedia of French Film Directors, Volume 1. Scarecrow Press, 2009.
