= Blanchette (1921 film) =

1921 film

- Directed by: René Hervil
- Based on: Blanchette by Eugène Brieux
- Starring: Pauline Johnson; Léon Mathot; Thérèse Kolb
- Cinematography: Amédée Morrin
- Production company: Films A. Legrand
- Distributed by: Pathé Frères
- Release date: 22 April 1921
- Country: France
- Languages: Silent; French intertitles

Blanchette is a 1921 French silent drama film directed by René Hervil and starring Pauline Johnson, Léon Mathot and Thérèse Kolb. It is based on the 1892 play of the same title by Eugène Brieux, which was later adapted again as the 1937 film Blanchette.

== Cast ==
- Pauline Johnson as Blanchette
- Léon Mathot as Auguste Morillon
- Thérèse Kolb as Madame Rousset
- Père Baptiste as Cantonnier Bonnenfant
- Julio de Romero as M. Galoux
- Jeanne Ambroise as Lucie de Romero
- Maurice de Féraudy as M. Rousset
- Jean Legrand as Georges Halma
- Pauline Carton
- Léon Bernard]

== Bibliography ==
- Goble, Alan. The Complete Index to Literary Sources in Film. Walter de Gruyter, 1999.
- Rège, Philippe. Encyclopedia of French Film Directors, Volume 1. Scarecrow Press, 2009.
