= Musicians of the Sky =

- Directed by: Georges Lacombe
- Written by: René Lefèvre; Jean Ferry
- Starring: Michèle Morgan; Michel Simon; René Lefèvre
- Cinematography: Henri Alekan; Paul Portier; Eugen Schüfftan
- Edited by: Louise Mazier
- Music by: Arthur Honegger; Arthur Hoérée
- Production company: Regina Films
- Distributed by: Filmsonor; English Films (US)
- Release dates: 10 April 1940 (Paris); 28 February 1945 (New York City)
- Running time: 98 min
- Country: France
- Language: French

Musicians of the Sky (French:Les Musiciens du ciel) is a 1940 French language motion picture drama directed by Georges Lacombe, based on novel "Musiciens Du Ceil" by René Lefèvre who co-wrote screenplay with Jean Ferry. The music score is by Arthur Honegger and Arthur Hoérée. The film stars Michèle Morgan, Michel Simon and René Lefèvre.

The principal actors Michèle Morgan and Michel Simon, had earlier appeared together in Port of Shadows (1938), but then they had not been comrades.

== Primary cast ==
- Michèle Morgan as Le lieutenant Saulnier
- Michel Simon as Le capitaine Simon
- René Lefèvre as Victor
- René Alexandre as Louis
- Auguste Bovério as Le commissaire
- Sylvette Saugé as La Louise
- Alexandre Rignault as Le grand Georges
