= Crainquebille (1934 film) =

1934 film

- Directed by: Jacques de Baroncelli
- Written by: Jacques de Baroncelli
- Based on: L'Affaire Crainquebille by Anatole France
- Produced by: Aimé Frapin
- Starring: Félicien Tramel; Rachel Devirys; Jeanne Fusier-Gir
- Cinematography: Jean Bachelet
- Edited by: Roger Leenhardt; Paula Neurisse
- Music by: Roland Manuel
- Production company: Les Films Artistiques Français
- Distributed by: Societe d'Edition et de Location de Films
- Release date: 6 March 1934
- Running time: 65 minutes
- Country: France
- Language: French

Crainquebille is a 1934 French drama film directed by Jacques de Baroncelli and starring Félicien Tramel, Rachel Devirys and Jeanne Fusier-Gir. It is based on the 1901 story L'Affaire Crainquebille by Anatole France, which had previously been adapted into a 1922 silent film Crainquebille directed by Jacques Feyder. The film's sets were designed by the art director Claude Bouxin.

== Synopsis ==
A Paris costermonger is sentence to fifteen days in prison for insulting a police officer. On his release he finds himself shunned by his former customers, loses his business and develops suicidal feelings. He is revived by the kindness of a street boy from Montmartre who inspires him to rebuild his life.

== Cast ==
- Félicien Tramel as Crainquebille
- Rachel Devirys as Madame Laure
- Jeanne Fusier-Gir as Madame Bayard
- Gaston Modot as L'agent Matra
- Émile Genevois as La Souris
- Bill Bocket as Martin
- René Hiéronimus as Maître Lemerle
- Carjol as Le président Bourriche
- Vincent Hyspa as Le docteur Mathieu
- Marcelle Monthil as Madame Masure
- Paulette Élambert as La petite Masure
- Marthe Mussine as Madame Mailloche

== Bibliography ==
- Bessy, Maurice & Chirat, Raymond. Histoire du cinéma français: 1929-1934. Pygmalion, 1988.
- Crisp, Colin. Genre, Myth and Convention in the French Cinema, 1929-1939. Indiana University Press, 2002.
- Goble, Alan. The Complete Index to Literary Sources in Film. Walter de Gruyter, 1999.
- Rège, Philippe. Encyclopedia of French Film Directors, Volume 1. Scarecrow Press, 2009.
