= Suzanne Bianchetti =

French actress (1889–1936)

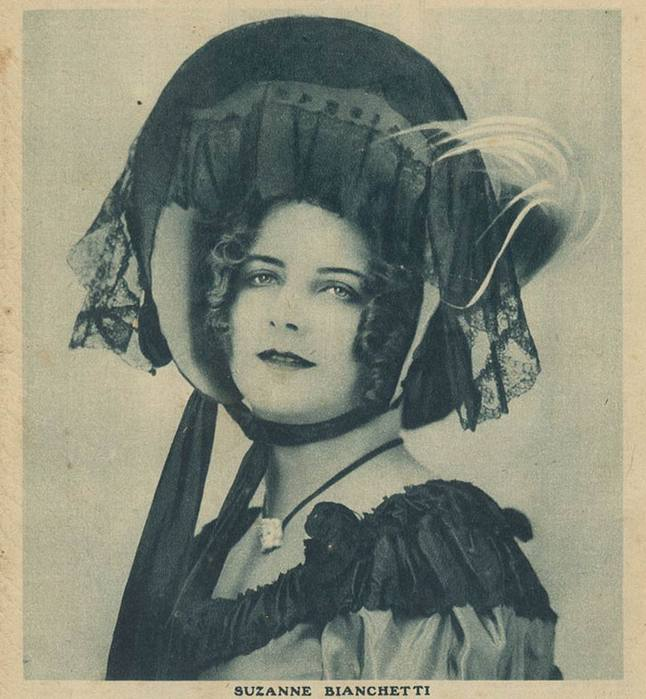
- Born: 24 February 1889; Paris, France
- Died: 17 October 1936 (aged 47); Paris, France
- Spouse: René Jeanne

Suzanne Bianchetti (24 February 1889 – 17 October 1936) was a film actress.

Suzanne Bianchetti appeared in her first film in the early 1900s and quickly became one of France's most loved and respected actresses. She appeared as Marie Antoinette in Abel Gance's 1927 epic, Napoléon and worked with many of the early notables of the silent film era such as Antonin Artaud and the singer, Damia.

She was married to writer and actor René Jeanne (1887–1969) who served as the director of L'Etablissement Cinématographique des Armées.

== Prix Suzanne Bianchetti ==
When Suzanne Bianchetti died in 1936 at the age of 47, the following year, her husband created an award in her memory to be given annually to the most promising young actress. It was given for the first time in 1937 to actress Junie Astor (1912–1967) for her performance in the film, Club de femmes. The award comes in the form of a medallion engraved with Suzanne Bianchetti's image. Since its inception, the Prix Suzanne Bianchetti has been awarded to many of the greatest names in French cinema who went on to national and international success, such as Micheline Presle, Simone Signoret, Annie Girardot, Geneviève Bujold, Audrey Tautou and Isabelle Adjani.

== Partial filmography ==
- Trois familles (1919, Short)
- Sa gosse (1919)
- Flipotte (1920)
- La marseillaise (1920) - Lise de Dietrich
- Une brute (1921)
- Le rêve (1921)
- Le père Goriot (1921)
- The Mysteries of Paris (1922) - La marquise d'Harville
- Jocelyn (1922) - Julie, la soeur de Jocelyn
- The Courier of Lyon (1923) - Clotilde d'Argence
- La légende de soeur Béatrix (1923) - Nilidor
- Imperial Violets (1924) - Eugénie de Montijo
- L'enfant des halles (1924) - Princesse Mila Serena
- La flambée des rêves (1924) - Suzanne
- L'heureuse mort (1925) - Lucie Larue
- Madame Sans-Gêne (1925) - L'Impératrice Marie-Louise
- La Brière (1925)
- Le Nègre blanc (1925) - Suzanne
- The Night Watch (1925) - Princesse Hedwig
- The Adventures of Robert Macaire (1925) - Louise de Sermèze
- Napoléon (1927) - La reine Marie-Antoinette
- The Loves of Casanova (1927) - Catherine II
- Verdun, visions d'histoire (1928) - L'épouse
- Kiss Me (1929) - Marquise Aurore
- Cagliostro (1929) - Marie-Antoinette
- Les Mufles (1929) - Laure Jantet
- The Man Without Love (1929) - Duchesse de Rogall
- Princes de la cravache (1930) - Mme d'Arbeiller
- The King of Paris (1930) - Duchesse de Marsignac
- Verdun, souvenirs d'histoire (1931) - La femme
- The Mad Night (1932) - Clotilde
- Imperial Violets (1932) - Eugénie de Montijo
- Aux portes de Paris (1935)
- Napoléon Bonaparte (1935) - Marie-Antoinette (uncredited)
- The Call of Silence (1936) - La femme du monde (final film role)
