= Robert Dartois =

French actor (1900–1959)

Robert Dartois (11 February 1900 – 13 January 1959) was a French actor. In 1948 he starred in the film The Lame Devil under Sacha Guitry.

He was born Robert Edouard Marcel Delandres in Trouville-sur-Mer, Calvados, France and died in Saint-Arnoult, Calvados, France.

== Selected filmography ==
- Imperial Violets (1932)
- The Queen's Necklace (1946)
