= René Jeanne =

French actor, writer and cinema historian

René Jeanne was a French actor, writer, and cinema historian. He was born in 1887 and died in 1969. Jeanne was married to actress Suzanne Bianchetti. Jeanne was also notable for serving on the jury of the Mostra de Venise in 1937 and 1938.

== Film Festival ==
Jeanne and fellow film artist Émile Vuillermoz had the idea of an international film festival in France. Its goal would be to compete with the Venice Film Festival, which had become politicised and was controlled at that time by Benito Mussolini. He passed the idea to Jean Zay, the French Minister of Public Instruction at the time. Zay appreciated the idea, and therefore undertook the founding of the famous Festival de Cannes.

== Filmography ==
=== As writer ===
- 1927 : Le Duel by Jacques de Baroncelli
- 1928 : Lights of Paris by Pierre Hemp
- 1932 : Imperial Violets by Henry Roussell
- 1946 : Les 3 tambours by Maurice de Canonge
- 1951 : Les Deux gamines by Maurice de Canonge

=== As actor ===
- 1927: Napoléon by Abel Gance: Jean-Charles Pichegru, a military instructor at Brienne College

== Bibliography ==
- HISTOIRE DU CINEMA de 1895 à 1929 with Charles Ford
