= René Hervil =

French actor, screenwriter and film director

- René Hervil in 1919
- Born: René Louis Dezerville; 27 March 1881; Levallois-Perret, Hauts-de-Seine, France
- Died: 1 July 1960 (aged 79); Sartrouville, Yvelines, France
- Occupations: Actor, writer, director
- Years active: 1909–1936 (film )

René Hervil (1881–1960) was a French actor, screenwriter and film director. Most of his films were made during the silent era. He directed the Maud series of films between 1912 and 1915 starring the Anglo-French actress Aimée Campton.

== Selected filmography ==
- Infatuation a.k.a. Bouclette (1918)
- In Old Alsace (1920)
- Blanchette (1921)
- Lord Arthur Savile's Crime (1922)
- The Gardens of Murcia (1923)
- The Secret of Polichinelle (1923)
- Paris (1924)
- Knock (1925)
- The Flame (1926)
- The Man with the Hispano (1926)
- The Chocolate Girl (1927)
- Prince Jean (1928)
- The Best Mistress (1929)
- The Sweetness of Loving (1930)
- The Mystery of the Villa Rose (1930)
- Azaïs (1931)
- Nicole and Her Virtue (1932)
- Our Lord's Vineyard (1932)
- Mannequins (1933)
- A Train in the Night (1934)
- The Two Girls (1936)

== Bibliography ==
- Goble, Alan. The Complete Index to Literary Sources in Film. Walter de Gruyter, 1999.
