= In Old Alsace (1920 film) =

1920 film

- Directed by: René Hervil
- Written by: Alexandre Chatrian (novel); Emile Erckmann (novel); Suzanne Devoyod; René Hervil
- Starring: Léon Mathot; Huguette Duflos; Thérèse Kolb
- Cinematography: Amédée Morrin
- Production company: Les Films Molière
- Distributed by: Roy Films
- Release date: 6 February 1920
- Country: France
- Languages: Silent; French intertitles

In Old Alsace (French:L'ami Fritz) is a 1920 French silent film directed by René Hervil and starring Léon Mathot, Huguette Duflos and Thérèse Kolb. It was based on a novel by Alexandre Chatrian and Emile Erckmann and was remade as a sound film of the same title in 1933.

== Cast ==
- Léon Mathot as Fritz Kobus
- Huguette Duflos as Suzel
- Thérèse Kolb as Catherine
- Édouard de Max as David Sichel
- Louis Kerly
- Henri Maillard
- Flamion
- Marey]
- Maurice de Féraudy

== Bibliography ==
- Dayna Oscherwitz & MaryEllen Higgins. The A to Z of French Cinema. Scarecrow Press, 2009.
