= Imperial Violets (1952 film) =

1952 film

- Directed by: Richard Pottier
- Written by: Jesús María de Arozamena; Henry Roussel; Marc-Gilbert Sauvajon
- Produced by: Cesáreo González; Emile Natan
- Starring: Luis Mariano; Carmen Sevilla; Simone Valère
- Cinematography: César Fraile; Christian Matras
- Edited by: Christian Gaudin; Gaby Peñalba
- Music by: Francis Lopez
- Production companies: Producciones Benito Perojo; Productions Emile Natan; Suevia Films
- Release date: 12 December 1952
- Running time: 94 minutes
- Countries: France; Spain
- Language: French

Imperial Violets (French: Violettes impériales, Spanish: Violetas imperiales) is a 1952 French-Spanish historical musical film directed by Richard Pottier and starring Luis Mariano, Carmen Sevilla and Simone Valère. It is an operetta film, based on the 1948 stage work of the same title. It was shot at the Saint-Maurice Studios and Joinville Studios in Paris.The film's sets were designed by Léon Barsacq and the costumes by Marcel Escoffier and Jean Zay.

It was second most popular film released in France in 1952, attracting an audience of more than eight million.

== Cast ==
- Luis Mariano as Juan de Ayala
- Carmen Sevilla as Violetta
- Simone Valère as Eugénie de Montijo
- Marie Sabouret as Mme. de Pierrefeu
- Colette Régis as Mme de Montijo
- Louis Arbessier as Napoleon III
- Micheline Francey as Clotilde
- María Riquelme as Anaïs
- Véra Norman as Mirette
- Raymond Girard as Prosper Mérimée
- Lucien Blondeau as Le grand chambellan
- Paul Faivre as L'aubergiste
- Camille Guérini as Le docteur
- René Hell as Le cocher
- Angustias Albaicín
- Rafael Arcos
- Francisco Bernal
- Jackie Blanchot
- Joseph Chaumel
- Aurora de Alba
- Lolita De Silva
- Gil Delamare
- Félix Fernández
- Mateo Guitart
- Maruja Heredia
- Lucien Nat
- Rafael Nogales
- Raphaël Patorni
- Joaquín Pujol
- Manuel Requena
- Alfonso Rojas

== See also ==
- Imperial Violets (1924)
- Imperial Violets (1932)

== Bibliography ==
- Hayward, Susan. French Costume Drama of the 1950s: Fashioning Politics in Film. Intellect Books, 2010.
