= Les affaires sont les affaires (Mirbeau play) =

French comedy in three acts

Business is business
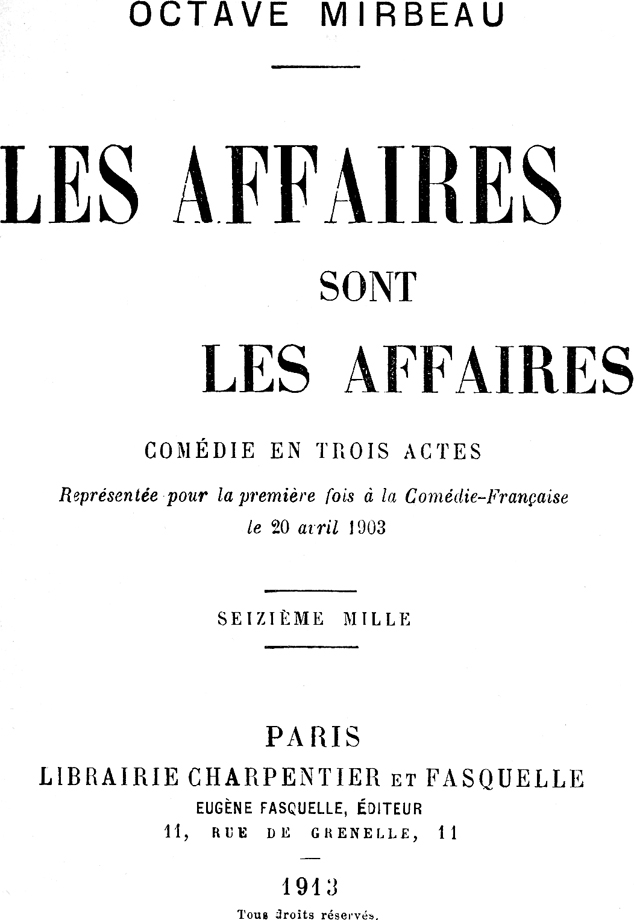
- Author: Octave Mirbeau
- Original title: 'Les affaires sont les affaires'
- Language: French
- Genre: comedy
- Publisher: Fasquelle
- Publication date: April 1903
- Publication place: France

Business Is Business (French: Les affaires sont les affaires) is a French comedy in three acts, by the novelist and playwright Octave Mirbeau, performed in April 1903 on the stage of Comédie-Française, in Paris, and worldwide acclaimed, especially in Russia, Germany and United States.

An English-language adaption by Sydney Grundy was produced in London in 1905. An English translation, by Richard J. Hand, was published by Intellect Books in Two Plays: "Business is Business" and "Charity", January 2012, 147 pages (ISBN 9781841504865).

== Comedy of manners ==
The work is a classical comedy of manners with characters, in the tradition of Molière, in which Mirbeau criticizes the French society of the Third Republic and the world of business as a legal kind of gangsterism.

When the play was presented in Paris during the 1994-5 season (400 performances), it was commented that business and scandals are no different today than they were 100 years ago.

== Main character ==
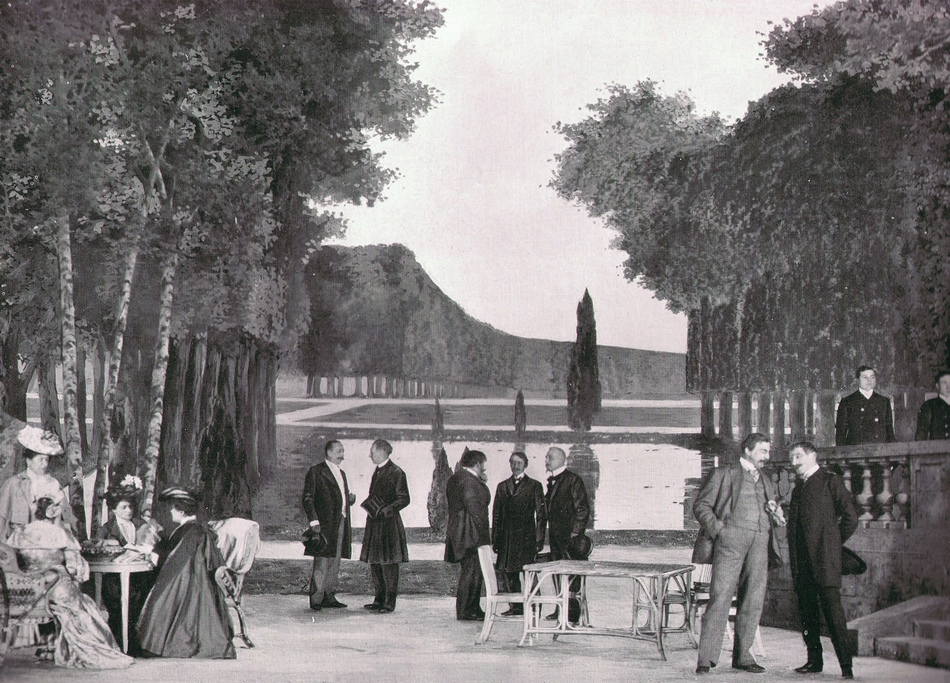
Business is business, Comédie-Française, April 1903

The fable is built around the main character, symbolically named Isidore Lechat. He is a predator without any scruples, predecessor of the modern masters of business intrigue, a "brasseur d'affaires" and money-grubber, who is a product of the new world, a figure who makes money from everything and spreads his tentacles out over the world. He sacrifices his children in his obsession to get more and more money and power: Lechat insists upon purchasing an aristocratic husband for his daughter Germaine, and upon making his corrupted son Xavier the leader of Parisian society, paying for him fabulous gambling debts. Can there be anything that money will not buy?

But almighty Lechat, in spite of his 50 million francs, is powerless in front of death (his son is killed in a motor car accident), as well as in front of love (his daughter Germaine rejects the "beautiful" marriage he arranged and runs away with her moneyless lover, Lucien Garraud). Lechat, in a Shakespearian final scene, is overwhelmed by the shattering of his plans, but even more so by the mortal blow to his vanity.
