= Imperial Violets (1932 film) =

1932 film

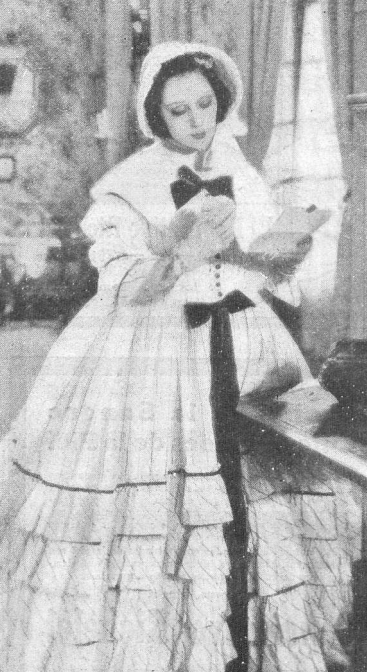
- Raquel Meller
- Directed by: Henry Roussel
- Written by: René Jeanne
- Starring: Raquel Meller; Suzanne Bianchetti; Georges Péclet
- Cinematography: Raoul Aubourdier; Fédote Bourgasoff
- Music by: José Padilla; Tiarko Richepin
- Production company: M.J. Films
- Release date: 16 December 1932
- Country: France
- Language: French

Imperial Violets (French: Violettes impériales; German: Die Veilchen der Kaiserin) is a 1932 French historical film directed by Henry Roussel and starring Raquel Meller, Suzanne Bianchetti and Georges Péclet. It is a remake of the 1924 silent film of the same title.

The film's sets were designed by the art directors René Decrais and Robert Gys.

== Cast ==
- Raquel Meller as Violetta
- Suzanne Bianchetti as Eugénie de Montijo
- Georges Péclet as Pierre de Saint-Affremont
- Émile Drain as Napoleon III
- Paule Andral as Madame de Montijo
- Carlotta Conti as Madame de Berry-Fronsac
- Marguerite Charles as La maréchale de Mondovi
- Jeannette Marcy as Mademoiselle Adélaïde
- Louisa de Mornand as Madame de la Tour-Maignan
- Robert Dartois as Le duc de Morny
- Victor Vina as Professeur Fourras
- Carlos San Martín as Le marquis Carlos Lopez Vega Santianos
- Jean Reyma as Raoul
- Fernand Mailly as L'évêque
- Jeanne de Carol
- Suzy Delair
- Myane Destrem
- Jean Guilton
- Pierre Gérald
- Made Sylvere

== International Release ==
The film was released in the United States in 1935 as La Violetera, with Spanish, rather than English, subtitles.

== See also ==
- Imperial Violets (1924)
- Imperial Violets (1952)

== Bibliography ==
- Dayna Oscherwitz & MaryEllen Higgins. The A to Z of French Cinema. Scarecrow Press, 2009.
