= Imperial Violets (1924 film) =

1924 film

- Directed by: Henry Roussel
- Written by: Henry Roussel
- Starring: Raquel Meller; Suzanne Bianchetti; André Roanne
- Cinematography: Jules Kruger; Paul Portier
- Production company: Productions Henry Roussell
- Release date: 3 February 1924
- Country: France
- Languages: Silent; French intertitles

Imperial Violets (French:Violettes impériales) is a 1924 French silent historical film directed by Henry Roussel and starring Raquel Meller, Suzanne Bianchetti and André Roanne. It was remade by Roussel as a sound film of the same title in 1932.

The film's sets were designed by the art director Robert Gys.

== Cast ==
- Raquel Meller as Violetta
- Suzanne Bianchetti as Eugénie de Montijo
- André Roanne as Comte de Saint-Affremond
- Jane Even as Comtesse de Saint-Affremond
- Jimmy O'Kelly as Juan
- Claude France as Mademoiselle de Perry-Fronsac
- Roger San Juana as Manuel
- Robert Guilbert as Duc de Morny
- Sylviane de Castillo as Madame de Montijo
- Mademoiselle Farnèse as Duchesse de Mondovi
- Daurelly as Napoleon III
- Albert Brouett as Docteur Malavert
- Girardo as José
- Danielle Vigneau as Petit frère de Violetta
- Suzy Béryl as Dame d'honneur
- Jacques Cabelli
- Léon Courtois
- Luc Dartagnan
- Pierre Delmonde
- Robby Guichard
- Jean-Paul Le Tarare
- Marais
- Paulette Marchal
- Laurent Morléas
- Hietta Stella
- Marie-Louise Voisin

== See also ==
- Imperial Violets (1932)
- Imperial Violets (1952)

== Bibliography ==
- Powrie, Phil & Rebillard, Éric. Pierre Batcheff and stardom in 1920s French cinema. Edinburgh University Press, 2009
