= Georges de La Fouchardière =

French journalist

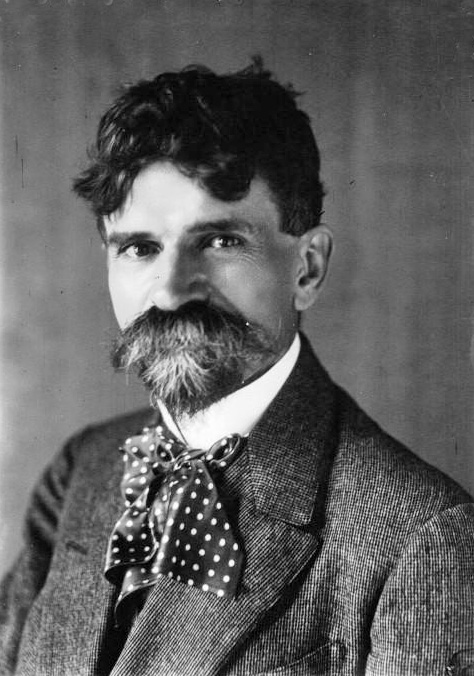
Georges de la Fouchardière, 1920

Georges Alphonse de La Fouchardière (February 1874 - 10 February 1946) was a French writer and journalist. He wrote for the Canard enchaîné (creator of the "Chronique du Bouif"), at L'Œuvre, as well as being the author of several literary works, notably La Chienne, a story adapted for film by Jean Renoir under the same title and by Fritz Lang as Scarlet Street.

Georges de La Fouchardière graduated in literature after studying at the Collège Stanislas in Paris and graduated from HEC Paris in 1901.
