= Henry Roussel =

French silent film actor, director and screenwriter (1875–1946)

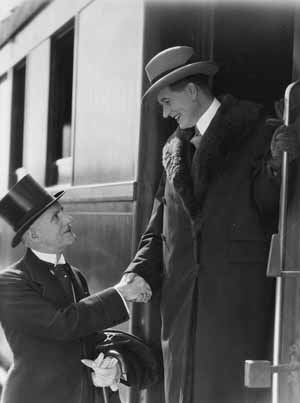
- Born: Henri Léon Roussel; 17 November 1875
- Died: 13 February 1946 (aged 70)
- Occupations: actor; film director; screenwriter
- Years active: 1912—1939

Henry Roussel (French pronunciation: [ɑ̃ʁi ʁusɛl]; 1875–1946), also known as Henry Roussell, was a French silent film actor, film director and screenwriter best known for his silent films of the 1910s and 1920s.

He starred in well over 40 films between 1912 and 1939.

== Selected filmography ==
- The Last Pardon (1913)
- The Cameo (1913)
- The Gaieties of the Squadron (1913)
- The Corsican Brothers (1917)
- L'Ame du bronze (1918)
- The Soul of Bronze (1921)
- Imperial Violets (1924) (Violettes Impériales)
- The Promised Land (1925)
- The Farewell Waltz (1928)
- Les Nouveaux Messieurs (1929)
- Fun in the Barracks (1932)
- Imperial Violets (1932)
- Orange Blossom (1932)
- Arlette and Her Fathers (1934)
- The Squadron's Baby (1935)
- Imperial Violets (1952, original story)
