= Charles Sweeny =

American soldier of fortune

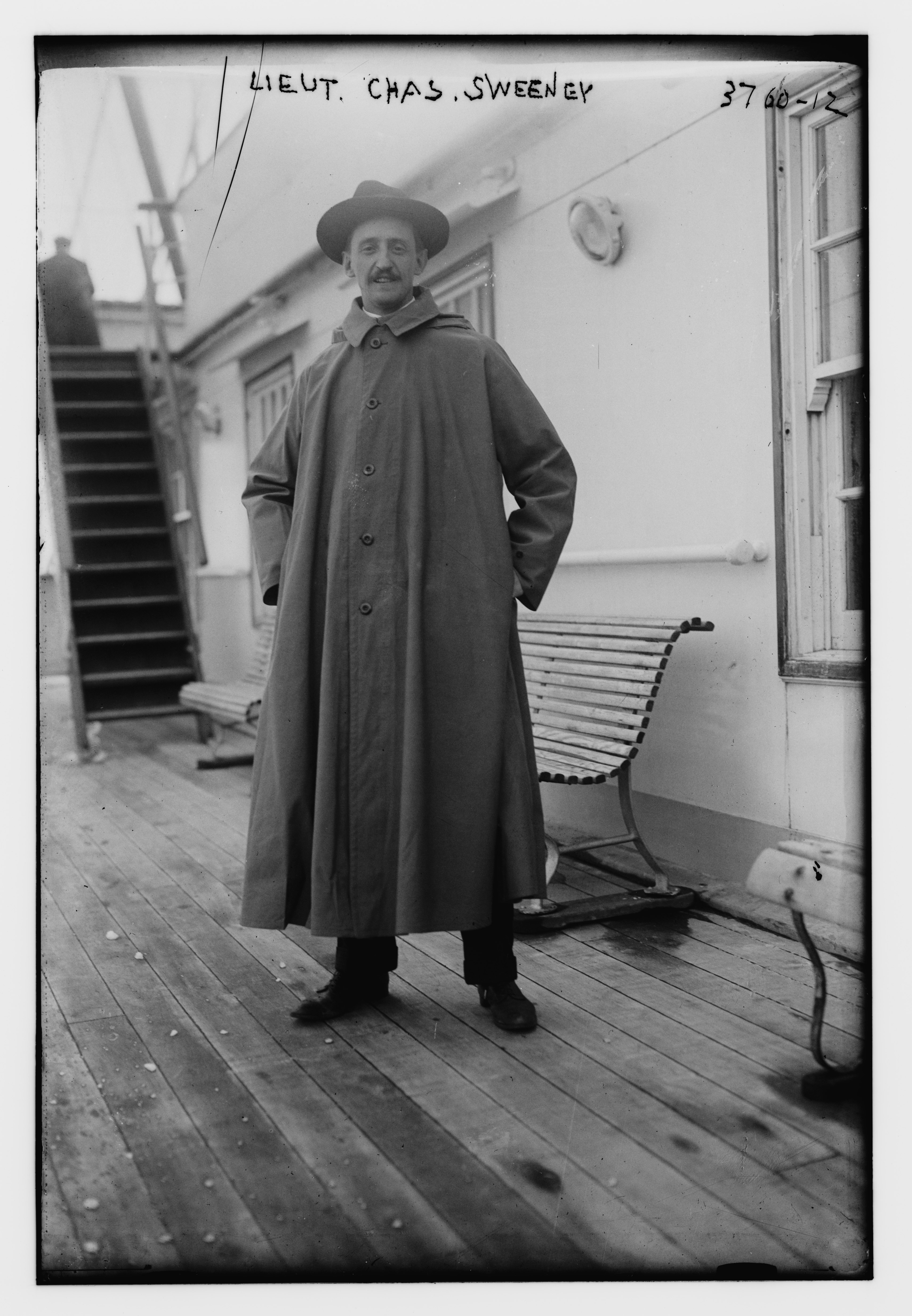
- Sweeny between c. 1915 to c. 1920
- Born: January 26, 1882; San Francisco, California, United States
- Died: February 27, 1963 (aged 81); Salt Lake City, Utah, United States
- Education: United States Military Academy
- Military career
- Allegiance: (French Third Republic) France; United States (Second Polish Republic) Poland; United Kingdom
- Branch: French Foreign Legion (1914–1917); United States Army (1917–1919); Polish army (1919?–1920); Royal Air Force
- Rank: Captain (Foreign Legion); Lieutenant colonel (US Army); Brigadier general (Polish army); Group captain, temporary group captain or honorary group captain (RAF)
- Awards: Legion of Honour

Charles Michael Sweeny (January 26, 1882 – February 27, 1963) was an American soldier of fortune, United States Army lieutenant colonel, French Foreign Legion officer, Polish army brigadier general, Royal Air Force (RAF) group captain, and journalist who fought in numerous conflicts in the 20th century. He recruited fellow Americans to fight in World War II prior to the United States entering the war.

== Early life and family ==
He was born in San Francisco to Charles and Emeline Sweeny. Charles Sr. was the son of poor Irish immigrants, but made his fortune in mining in the region around Coeur d'Alene, Idaho (see Bunker Hill Mine and Smelting Complex). The family settled in nearby Spokane, Washington. A 1920 Associated Press article called Charles Jr. a "multimillionaire's son."

He graduated from the University of Notre Dame.

One nephew, Charles Francis Sweeny (1910–1993), was the first husband of Margaret Whigham; they married in 1933 and divorced in 1947. (Afterward, she married the Duke of Argyll and became Margaret Campbell, Duchess of Argyll.) He would later be instrumental in forming the Eagle Squadrons. Another nephew, Robert "Bob" Sweeny, was an accomplished golfer on both sides of the Atlantic, playing in numerous Masters Tournaments and winning the 1937 British Amateur Championship.

== Career ==
Sweeny enrolled in the United States Military Academy at West Point in 1900, but was expelled not once but twice, in 1901 and, after being reinstated, in 1903.

He fought in several conflicts in Central and South America, including for Francisco I. Madero in Mexico and against José Santos Zelaya in Nicaragua and Cipriano Castro in Venezuela, according to his friend Ernest Hemingway.

Sweeny, by then married, fought in World War I, first with the French Foreign Legion in 1914. Starting as a private, he was eventually commissioned a lieutenant for conspicuous gallantry at the Second Battle of Champagne in September 1915, and later promoted to captain for capturing a German trench with just a dozen men, but was severely wounded. He was awarded the Legion of Honour. At his request, in 1917 he was permitted to transfer to the United States Army after America entered the war. He was commissioned a major and was later promoted to lieutenant colonel. Wounded in the Argonne offensive, he recuperated in Paris. He was discharged in July 1919.

He then organized 200 experienced former United States Army officers to fight on the Polish side in the Polish–Soviet War (1919–1920). He himself participated in the 1920 Battle of Warsaw. For his efforts, he was made a Polish army brigadier general in 1920. Later correspondence indicates he was good friends with fellow American and fighter pilot Merian C. Cooper (better known now as a Hollywood movie producer), who also fought on the Polish side; Cooper was shot down that same year and became a prisoner of war of the Soviets.

In the Greco-Turkish War (1919–1922), Sweeny was ostensibly a war correspondent, but biographer Donald McCormick claims he was actually a spy for French Intelligence. It was here that Sweeny met another war correspondent, Ernest Hemingway; they became lifelong friends. (When Hemingway died in 1961, Sweeny served as one of his honorary pallbearers.) He also landed an interview with Turkish leader Kemal Atatürk, and at the personal recommendation of French General Maxime Weygand, became one of Atatürk's military advisors. An October 1923 magazine article describes Sweeny as "now war correspondent of the New York World in the Near East".

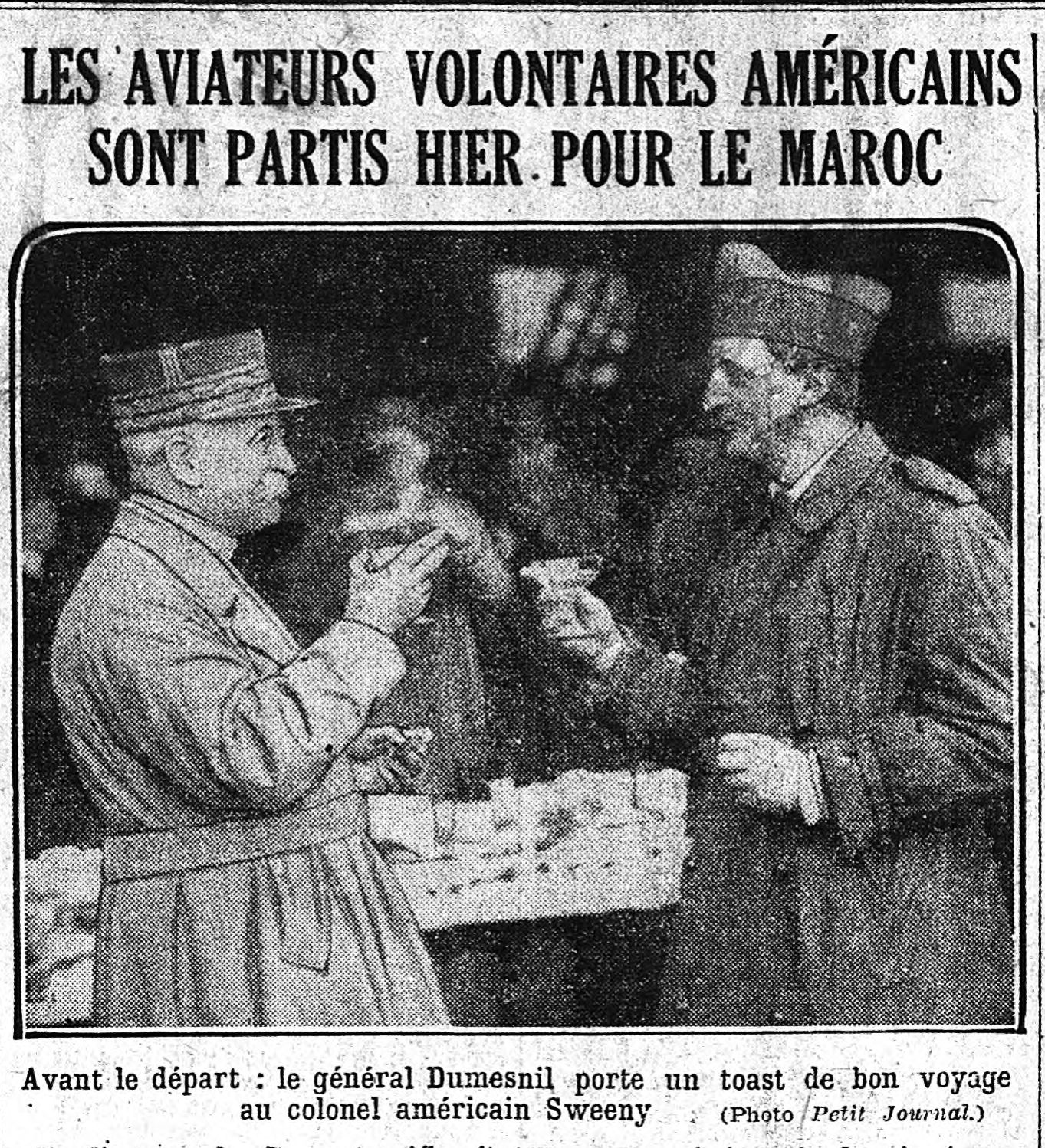
Front page of the Paris edition of Le Petit Journal, August 6, 1925. Translation: "The American volunteer pilots left yesterday for Morocco / Before departure: General Dumesnil gives the American colonel Sweeny a bon voyage toast."

In 1925, Sweeny fought in Morocco for the French in the Rif War and recruited World War I veterans for the Escadrille Cherifienne, the 19th Squadron of the Moroccan Aviation Regiment, which was responsible for the bombardment of Chefchaouen. He became the leader of the Sultan of Morocco's air force. Sweeney later explained his involvement in the war, saying, "In our view, France, in fighting Abdel Krim, is fighting the cause of the white man's civilization, and all who have formed this squadron know enough of the world to appreciate what the white man's civilization means."

After learning about the mercenaries, the U.S. Department of State issued instructions to its consul in Morocco to warn the Americans that they would risk the revocation of their citizenship, imprisonment, and fines under the Neutrality Act of 1794 if they did not end their involvement in the war. While the initial public reception to the mercenaries had been mixed back home, their involvement in bombing campaigns caused widespread outrage. The Literary Digest headlined the news as "U.S. bombs and Rif babies". The Pittsburgh Post-Gazette said it would have been one thing if the mercenaries were fighting for the Riffians, but that there was "nothing gallant or chivalrous in the rain of bombs, dropped on defenseless villages." The Christian Century, a leading Protestant magazine, remarked:

These American soldiers of fortune have no pretexts other than the exaltation of the manhunt. This is a royal sport and the fact that these women and children who have had the misfortune to be born in the Rif villages as victims has no more meaning for them than the death of a rabbit during a hunt.

The State Department repeated its threat to prosecute the pilots for violating American neutrality laws if they did not immediately cease participating in the war, but the pilots rejected the warnings. Nevertheless, after only six weeks of operations, the French disbanded the squadron under diplomatic pressure from the United States. According to Marshal Philippe Pétain, the unit carried out 350 combat missions in six weeks and dropped more than 40 tons of ammunition. According to Lieutenant Colonel Charles Kerwood, the squadron had bombed villages and caused considerable civilian casualties. There was even a proven instance of the American squadron bombing a village which had previously surrendered.

Sweeny observed and evaluated the effectiveness of French aircraft in the Spanish Civil War, and was reunited with Hemingway.

In 1939, he recruited and financed American flyers to fight in World War II in France at a time when the United States was still neutral, making his activities a violation of the Neutrality Acts of the 1930s. This earned him the ire of FBI Director J. Edgar Hoover, who tried unsuccessfully to apprehend him. The British, on the other hand, made Sweeny a Royal Air Force reserve captain, group captain temporary group captain, or honorary group captain. Thirty-two of his recruits reached France before the Germans invaded the country in May 1940, though none of them managed to fly while there. Of these, four were killed, 11 were taken prisoner, and five reached England.

Meanwhile, his nephew Charles Francis Sweeny was in London persuading the Air Ministry to gather all the Americans currently serving in the RAF, plus any new recruits, into what would become known as the Eagle Squadrons. Another of the elder Sweeny's recruits, Chesley G. Peterson, was unable to get to France, but managed to join the Eagle Squadrons instead, and eventually became an ace and a United States Air Force major general.

== Later life ==
He eventually retired and lived in Salt Lake City, Utah. He died there on February 27, 1963, and was buried at Mount Olivet Cemetery.
