= Rif War =

1921–1926 war between Spain and Riffian tribes of Morocco

- Part of the interwar period
- (clockwise from top left): Spanish Renault FT-17 stuck in a shellhole; Riffian armored car with troops; French artillery battery in action; Riffian guards in front of a command post; Soldiers of the San Fernando Regiment climbing a defense wall; Riffian fighter with his camel
Date	1921–1926
Location	Rif, Morocco
Result	Spanish-French victory
Territorial changes	Spanish conquest of the Rif

Belligerents
Spain: Spanish Morocco; France (1924–1926): French Morocco; (French Third Republic) French West Africa	Republic of the Rif • Riffians • Jebala • Ghomara • Senhaja Srair

Commanders and leaders
(Spain) Manuel Silvestre † (Spain) Francisco Franco (WIA) (Spain) Dámaso Berenguer (Spain) José Millán-Astray (WIA) (Spain) Miguel Primo de Rivera (Spain) Alfredo Kindelán (Spain) José Sanjurjo (Spain) Juan Yagüe (Spain) Leopoldo Saro (Spain) Emilio Mola (French Third Republic) Philippe Pétain (French Third Republic) Hubert Lyautey; M. Ahmed er Raisuni (POW) (surrendered)	Abdelkrim el-Khattabi; M'hamed El Khattabi; Abdel-Salam Mohammed Abdel-Karim; Haddou n' Mouh Ameziane; Bou Lahya; Ahmed Kheriro †; Mohamed Cheddi; Mohamed Bohout; Driss Khouja; Ahmed Dada; Kaddour Azirar; Mohamed n' Amar Ghul †; Kaddour n' Amar; Ismail Chadli; Caid Sarkach Houcein Tlemceni

Strength
(Spain) 60,000–100,000 soldiers or (Spain) 140,000 soldiers (French Third Republic) 160,000 soldiers in northern Morocco 1925 or (French Third Republic) 325,000 troops and 400,000 reserves (First Portuguese Republic) 1,085 - 6,000 volunteer soldiers in Spanish Legion and unknown amount in Portuguese Red Cross; Total: 221,085-871,000 (United States) 1 "Rouge Squadron" of American volunteers in the French service. (Spain) (French Third Republic) Total aircraft: +200	Spanish and French estimates: 75,000–125,000 men (According to Charles Monteil: never more than 20,000 with firearms at the same time) including fewer than 7,000 "elites" Other sources: Autumn 1925: 35,000–50,000; March 1926: fewer than 20,000

Casualties and losses
(Spain) 43,500–63,000 casualties (France) 10,000–18,000 casualties The figures include killed, wounded, missing, captured and sick.	(Republic of the Rif) 30,000 casualties (including 10,000 dead); Other sources: 40,000-80,000 killed (combatants and civilians)

The Rif War (Note: Tarifit: ⴰⵎⴻⵏⵖⵉ ⵏ ⴰⵔⵉⴼ, romanized: Amenɣi n Arif; Arabic: حرب الريف, romanized: ḥarb ar-rīf; Spanish: Guerra del Rif; French: Guerre du Rif) was an anti-colonial war fought from 1921 to 1926 between the indigenous Berber tribes of the mountainous Rif region of northern Morocco and Spain (joined by France in 1924).

Led by Abd el-Krim, the Riffians attacked workers at the Minas del Rif iron ore mine and at first inflicted several defeats on the Spanish forces by using guerrilla tactics with the help of captured European weapons. After an unprecedented large landing of Spanish troops at Al Hoceima, considered the first amphibious landing in history to involve the use of tanks and aircraft, as well as France joining the conflict, Abd el-Krim surrendered and was put into exile.

In July 1909, some Riffians attacked Spanish workers constructing a rail-bridge to provide access to iron mines near Melilla. This incident led to the summoning of reinforcements from Spain itself. A series of skirmishes over the following weeks cost the Spanish over a thousand casualties. By September, the Spanish Army had 40,000 troops in northern Morocco and had occupied the mountainous tribal regions to the south and southeast of Melilla. The military operations in Jebala, in the Moroccan west, began in 1911 with the Larache landing. Spain worked to pacify a large part of the most violent areas until 1914, a slow process of consolidation of frontiers that lasted until 1919. The following year, after the signing of the Treaty of Fez, the northern Moroccan area was adjudicated to Spain as a protectorate. The Riffian populations strongly resisted the Spanish, unleashing a conflict that would last for several years.

In 1921, in an attempt to consolidate control of the region, the Spanish troops suffered the catastrophic Disaster of Annual in addition to a rebellion led by Riffian leader Abd el-Krim. As a result, the Spanish retreated to a few fortified positions while Abd el-Krim ultimately created an entire independent state: the Republic of the Rif. The development of the conflict and its end coincided with the dictatorship of Primo de Rivera, who took on command of the campaign from 1924 to 1927. In addition, and after the Battle of Uarga in 1925, the French intervened in the conflict and established a joint collaboration with Spain that culminated in the Alhucemas landing, which proved a turning point. The Spanish also used chemical weapons during the conflict. By 1926, the area had been pacified; Abd-el-Krim surrendered to the French that year, and Spain gained effective control of the protectorate's territory at last.

The Rif War still causes much disagreement among historians. Some see in it a harbinger of the decolonization process in North Africa. Others consider it one of the last colonial wars, as it was the decision of the Spanish to conquer the Rif – nominally part of their Moroccan protectorate but de facto independent – that catalyzed the entry of France in 1924. The Rif War left a deep memory both in Spain and in Morocco. The Riffian insurgency of the 1920s can be interpreted as a precursor to the Algerian War which took place three decades later.

== Origins ==
Spain, 13 kilometres (8.1 mi; 7.0 nmi) across the Strait of Gibraltar from Africa, claimed influence over the Morocco region at the Berlin Conference (1884–1885). By the early 20th century, Morocco was divided into protectorates ruled by France and Spain. The Rif region had been assigned to Spain, but given that the sultans of Morocco had been unable to exert control over the region, Spanish sovereignty over the Rif was strictly de jure, existing only in the text of the General Act of the Berlin Conference on West Africa, to which the Riffians, who had de facto control of the land were not a party. For centuries, the Berber tribes of the Rif had fought off any attempt of outsiders to impose control on them. While the Rif mountains were visible to Europeans from ships in the Mediterranean Sea, Europeans had rarely, if ever, ventured into the area. Walter Burton Harris, the Morocco correspondent for The Times, who covered the war, wrote that as late as 1912 only "one or two Europeans had been able to visit the cedar forests that lie south of Fez. A few had travelled in the southern Atlas and pushed on into the Sus...and that was almost all". As Harris wrote, the Berbers "were often as inhospitable to the Arab as they were to the foreigner", and generally killed any outsiders who ventured into their territory.

Vincent Sheean, who covered the war for The New York Times, wrote that the Rif was a beautiful countryside of "[c]rimson mountains flung against a sky of hieratic blue, gorges magnificent and terrifying, peaceful green valleys between protecting precipices", a place that reminded him of his native Colorado. The Rif was also rich in high-grade iron ore, which could be easily extracted via open-pit mining. The promise of the Spanish state collecting revenues in the form of taxes and royalties from iron mining here was an incentive for it to bring the Rif under its control.

The Crown granted the concession to mine iron in the Rif to Horacio Echevarrieta. By 1920 he had brought out 800,000 tons of valuable high grade iron through relatively inexpensive open-pit mining. Though profitable, iron mining caused much environmental damage and required the displacement of the native people. As they received no share of the profits, the Rifians soon began to oppose the mining in their territory.

When Alfonso XIII ascended to the throne in 1886, Spain was considered a world power, with colonies in the Americas, Africa, Asia and the Pacific. But in the Spanish–American War, Spain lost Cuba, Puerto Rico, Guam and the Philippines in 1898, and sold the Mariana and Caroline Islands to Germany the following year; reducing the once great Spanish Empire to only a few footholds on the Moroccan coast and Spanish Guinea. To compensate for the losses in the Americas and Asia, there emerged a powerful Africanist faction in Spain led by Alfonso, who wanted a new empire in Africa. Finally, many within the politically powerful Catholic Church, preached the need for a new crusade to continue the Reconquista by conquering Morocco, adding their voices to the Africanist choir. For all these reasons, Spain began pushing into the Rif in 1909.

== Forces involved ==
=== Rifian forces ===
Riffian warriors in 1922

The Berber tribesmen had a long tradition of fierce fighting, combined with high standards of fieldcraft and marksmanship. They were capably led by Abd el-Krim, who demonstrated both military and political expertise. Despite never being a very large force, the Rifian regular army was highly trained and well versed in contemporary military tactics. The elite of the Rifian forces formed regular units which according to Abd el-Krim, quoted by the Spanish general Manuel Goded, numbered 6,000 to 7,000. Other sources put it much lower, at around 2,000 to 3,000.

The remaining Rifians were tribal militia selected by their Caids; they were not liable to serve away from their homes and farms for more than 15 consecutive days. General Goded estimated that at their peak, in June 1924, the Rifian forces numbered about 80,000 men, although Abd el-Krim was never able to arm more than 20,000 men at a time. However, this force was largely adequate in the early stages of the war. In the final days of the war, Rifian forces numbered about 12,000 men. In addition, Rifian forces were not well armed, with weapons badly maintained and in poor condition. A small number of the Riffian troops were Algerian deserters from the French Legion, some of them probably inspired by Emir Abdelkader's revolt against France.

=== Spanish forces ===
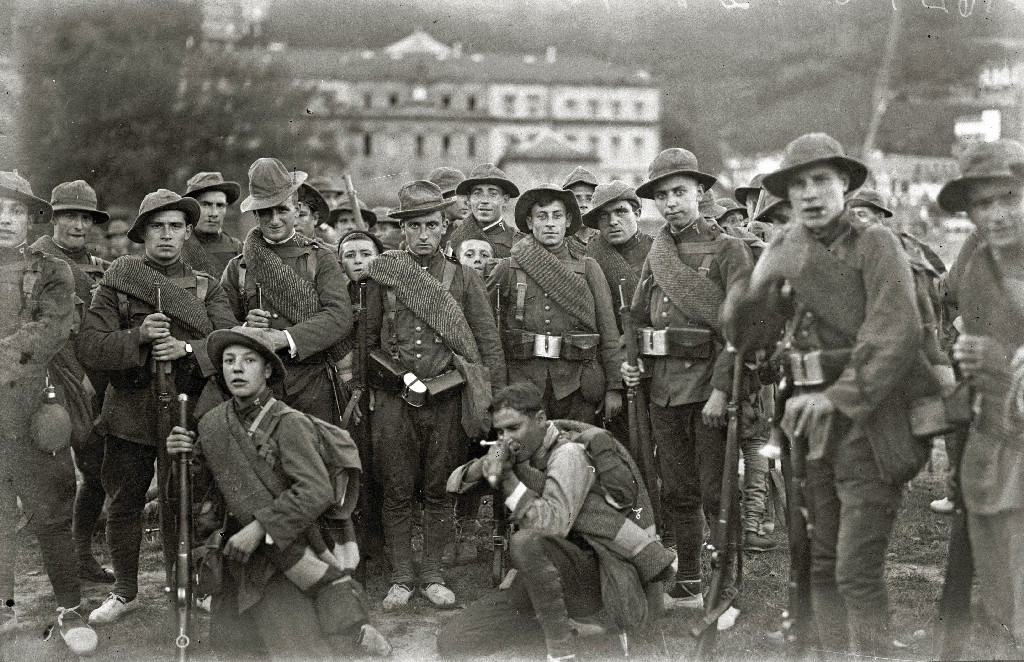
Spanish troops in San Sebastián, prior to their departure to the war

Initially, the Spanish forces in Morocco were largely composed of conscripts and reservists from Spain itself. These "Peninsular" troops were poorly supplied and prepared, few had marksmanship skills and proper battle training, and widespread corruption was reported amongst the officer corps, reducing supplies and morale. Of the Spanish troops in Morocco in 1921, well over half were completely illiterate conscripts from the poorest elements of Spanish society who had been sent to Morocco with minimal training. Despite assurances from General Manuel Fernández Silvestre that his equipment was sufficient to defeat the Rifians, in fact about three-quarters of the rifles at the Melilla arsenal were in shoddy condition due to poor maintenance, and a report from late 1920, which Spanish commanders never bothered to read, warned that many of the rifles held there were either unusable or more of a danger to the soldier firing them than to the enemy.

The average Spanish soldier in Morocco in 1921 was paid the equivalent of thirty-four US cents per day, and lived on a simple diet of coffee, bread, beans, rice and the odd piece of meat. Many soldiers bartered their rifles and ammunition at the local markets in exchange for fresh vegetables. The barracks that the soldiers lived in were unsanitary, and medical care at the few hospitals was very poor. Up in the mountains, Spanish soldiers lived in small outposts known as blocaos, which the American historian Stanley Payne observed: "Many of these lacked any sort of toilet, and the soldier who ventured out of the filthy bunker risked exposure to the fire of lurking tribesmen".

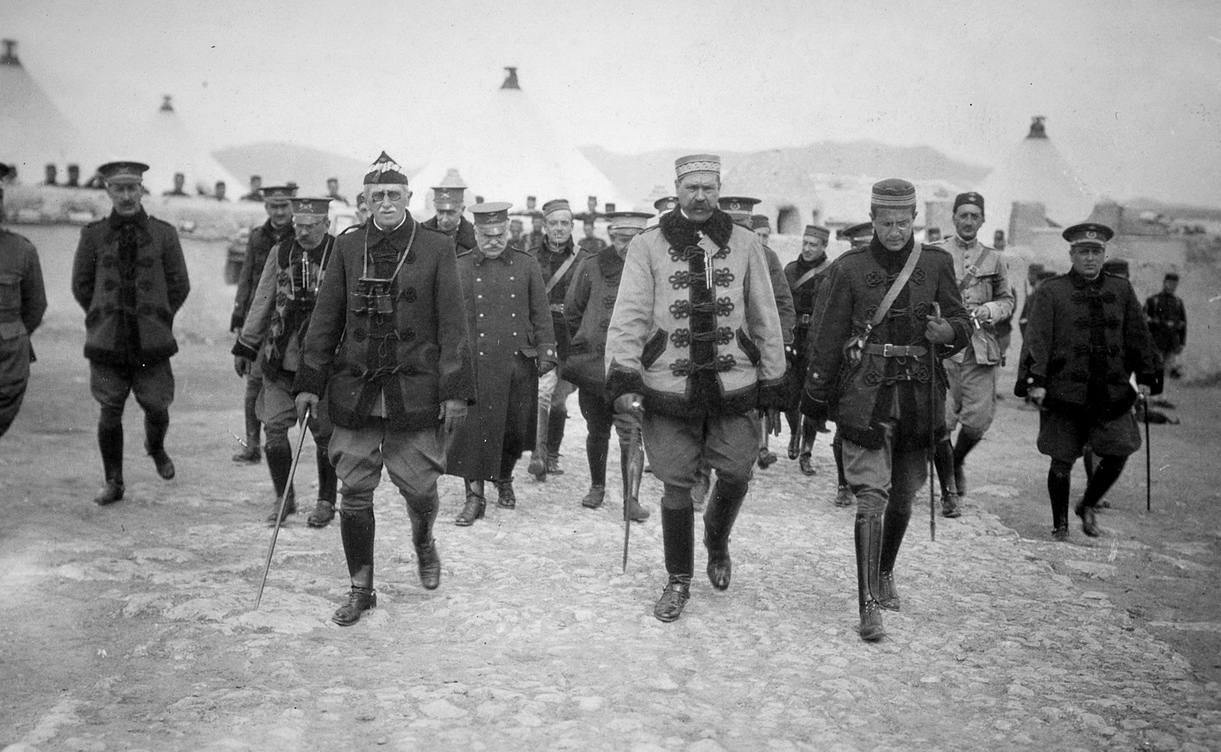
General Fernández Silvestre in Melilla, 1921

Continuing a practice first begun in Cuba, corruption flourished amongst the venal Spanish officer corps, with goods meant for the troops being sold on the black market and the funds intended to build roads and railroads in Morocco ending up in the pockets of senior officers. A high number of Spanish officers could not read maps, which explains why Spanish units so frequently got lost in the Rif mountains. In general, studying war was not considered to be a good use of an officer's time, and most officers devoted their time in Melilla in words of the American journalist James Perry to "gambling and whoring, sometimes molesting the native Moorish women". Morale in the Army was extremely poor and most Spanish soldiers just wanted to go home and leave Morocco forever. Because of the prostitutes from Spain, who attached themselves in great number to the Spanish bases in Morocco, venereal diseases were rampant in the Spanish Army. Fernández Silvestre was well aware of the poor morale of his soldiers, but he did not regard this as a problem, believing that his enemy was so inferior that the problems afflicting his troops were not an issue.

Even with their numerical superiority, the "Peninsular" troops proved no match for the highly skilled and motivated Rifian forces. Accordingly, much reliance came to be placed on the mainly professional units comprising Spain's Army of Africa. Since 1911, these had included regiments of Moroccan Regulares, who proved to be excellent soldiers.

The initiative was unpopular in parts of Spain as well. In 1909, during early conflicts with the Rif tribesmen, an attempt by the Spanish government to call up reservists led to a working-class uprising in Barcelona known as Tragic Week. The Catalan trade unions, many led by anarchists, argued that the working class of Barcelona had no quarrel with the people of the Rif.

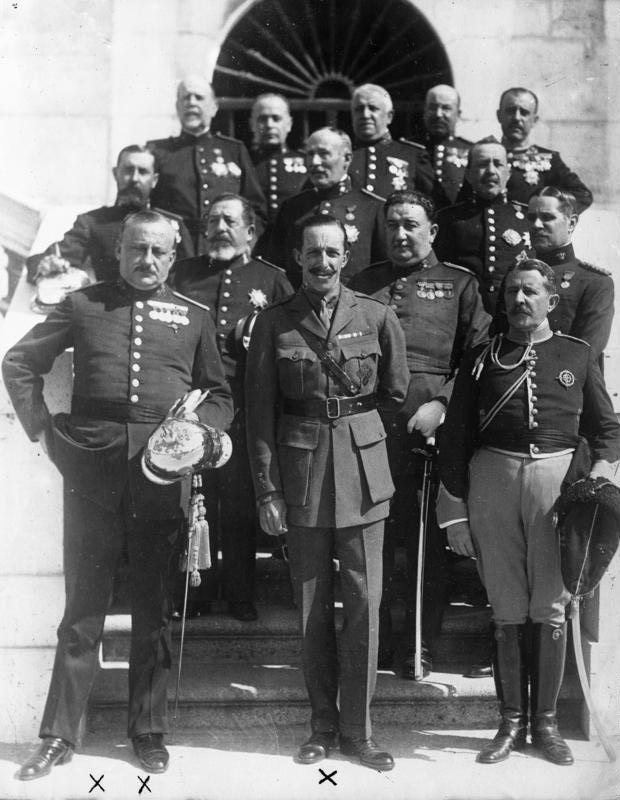
Primo de Rivera (front row left) with King Alfonso XIII and other high-ranking Spanish officers

After the Tragic Week of 1909, the Spanish government starting in 1911 tried to raise as many Regular units as possible to avoid further working class resistance to colonial wars as much of the Spanish working class had no desire to see their sons sent to Morocco, beginning a policy of what the Spanish historian Jose Alvarez called "Moroccanizing" the conquest of the Rif. Following the difficulties and setbacks that it had experienced in 1909–11, the Spanish army began to adopt much in organization and tactics from the French North African forces garrisoning most of Morocco and neighboring Algeria. Particular attention was paid to the French Foreign Legion and a Spanish equivalent, the Tercio de Extranjeros ('Foreigners' brigade'), known in English as the Spanish Legion, was formed in 1920. The regiment's second commander was then-Col. Francisco Franco, having risen rapidly through the ranks. In the Rif war, it was the Regulares and the Spanish Foreign Legion founded in 1919 that provided the elite forces that won Spain the war. Less than 25% of this "Foreign Legion" were, in fact, non-Spanish. Harshly disciplined and driven, they quickly acquired a reputation for ruthlessness. As their number grew, the Spanish Legion and the Regulares increasingly led offensive operations after the disasters that had been suffered by the conscript forces.

== Course of war ==
Localisation of the Republic of the Rif.

=== Early stages ===
As an outcome of the Treaty of Fez (1912) Spain gained possession of the lands around Melilla and Ceuta. In 1920, the Spanish commissioner, General Dámaso Berenguer, decided to conquer the eastern territory from the Jibala tribes, but had little success. The second-in-command was General Manuel Fernández Silvestre, who commanded the eastern sector. Fernández Silvestre had spread out his troops out in 144 forts and blocaos from Sidi Dris on the Mediterranean across the Rif mountains to an Annual and Tizi Azza and on to Melilla. A typical blocao held about a dozen men, while the larger forts had about 800 men. Fernández Silvestre, known for his boldness and impetuosity, had pushed his men too deep into the Rif mountains hoping to reach Alhucemas Bay without undertaking the necessary work to build a logistical support network capable of supplying his men out in the blocaos up in the Rif mountains. Abd el-Krim had sent Fernández Silvestre a letter warning him not to cross the Amekran river or else he would die. Fernández Silvestre commented to the Spanish press about the letter that: "This man Abd el-Krim is crazy. I'm not going to take seriously the threats of a little Berber caid [judge] whom I had at my mercy a short time ago. His insolence merits a new punishment". Abd el-Krim allowed Fernández Silvestre to advance deep into the Rif, knowing the Spanish logistics were in the words of the Spanish historian Jose Alvarez "tenuous" at best.

On 1 July 1921, the Spanish army in north-eastern Morocco under Fernández Silvestre collapsed when defeated by the forces of Abd el-Krim, in what became known in Spain as the disaster of Annual, some 8,000 soldiers and officers reported killed or disappeared out of some 20,000. The final Spanish death toll, both at Annual and during the subsequent rout that took Rifian forces to the outskirts of Melilla, was reported to the Cortes Generales as totaling 13,192. The Spanish were pushed back and during the following five years, occasional battles were fought between the two. The Rifian forces advanced to the east and captured over 130 Spanish military posts.

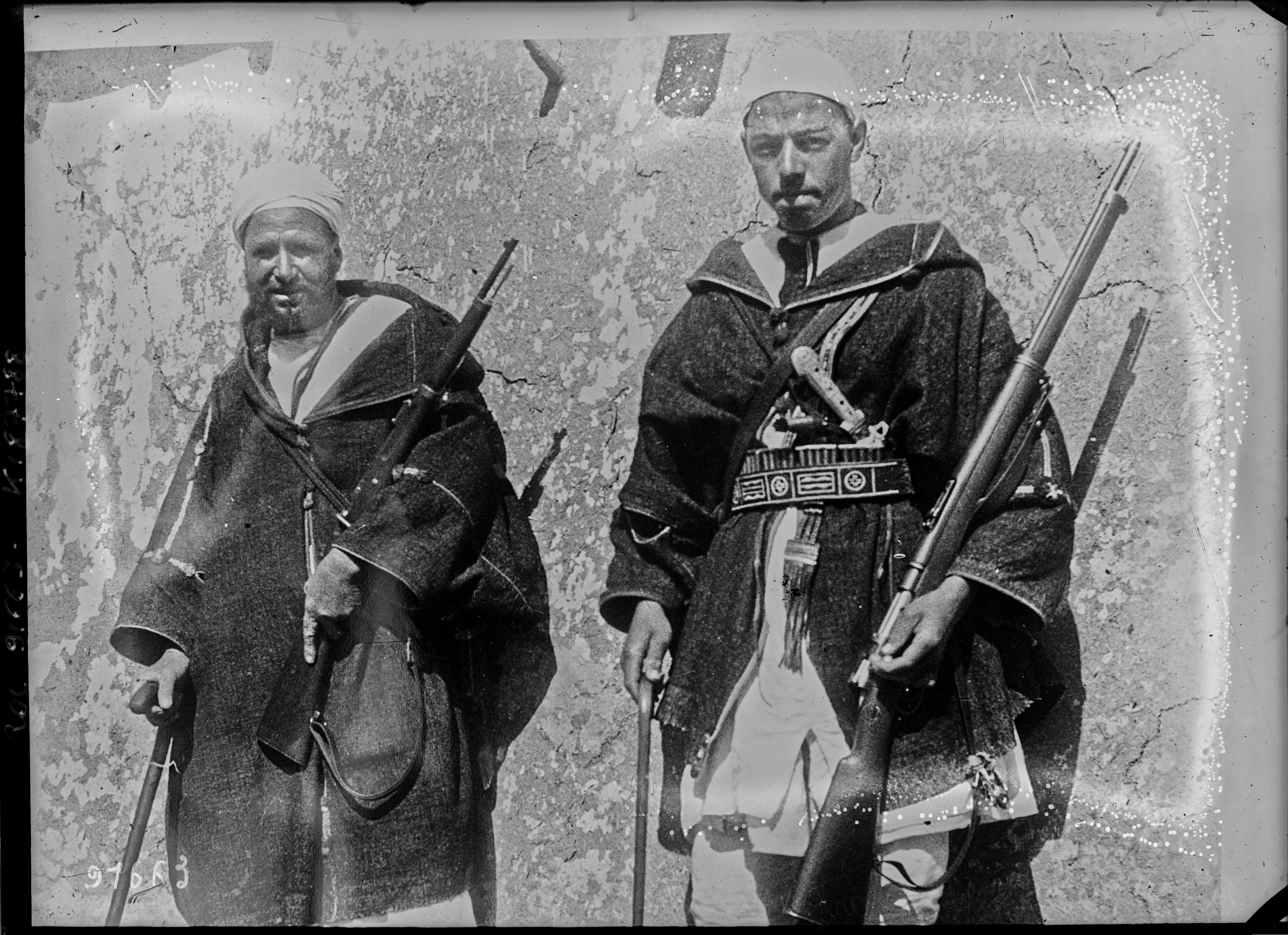
Berbers carrying captured rifles. A Spanish Mauser and a French Berthier Carbine

By late August 1921, Spain lost all the territories it had gained since 1909. Spanish troops were pushed back to Melilla, which was their biggest base in the eastern Rif. Spain still had 14,000 soldiers in Melilla. However, Abd el-Krim ordered his forces not to attack the town. He subsequently told the writer J. Roger-Matthieu that since citizens of other European nations were residing in Melilla, it was feared they would intervene in the war should their citizens come to harm. Other reasons included the dispersal of Rifian fighters from several loosely allied tribes following the victory at Annual; and the arrival in Melilla of substantial reinforcements from the Legion and other Spanish units recalled from operations in western Morocco. By the end of August Spanish forces at Melilla numbered 36,000 under General Jose Sanjurjo and the slow process of recovering the lost territory could begin. In September, Abd el-Krim proclaimed the establishment of the Republic of the Rif as an open act of rebellion against Spanish rule.

Thus the Spanish could keep their biggest base in the eastern Rif. Later Abd el-Krim would admit: "I bitterly regret this order. It was my biggest mistake. All the following tenor of events happened because of this mistake."

By January 1922 the Spanish had retaken their major fort at Monte Arruit (where they found the bodies of 2,600 of the garrison) and had reoccupied the coastal plain as far as Tiztoutine and Batel. The Riffian forces had consolidated their hold of the inland mountains and stalemate was reached.

The Spanish military suffered losses even at sea; in March the transport ship Juan de Joanes was sunk in Alhucemas Bay by Riffian coastal batteries, and in August 1923 the battleship España ran aground off Cape Tres Forcas and was eventually scrapped in situ.

In a bid to break the stalemate, the Spanish military turned to the use of chemical weapons against the Riffians.

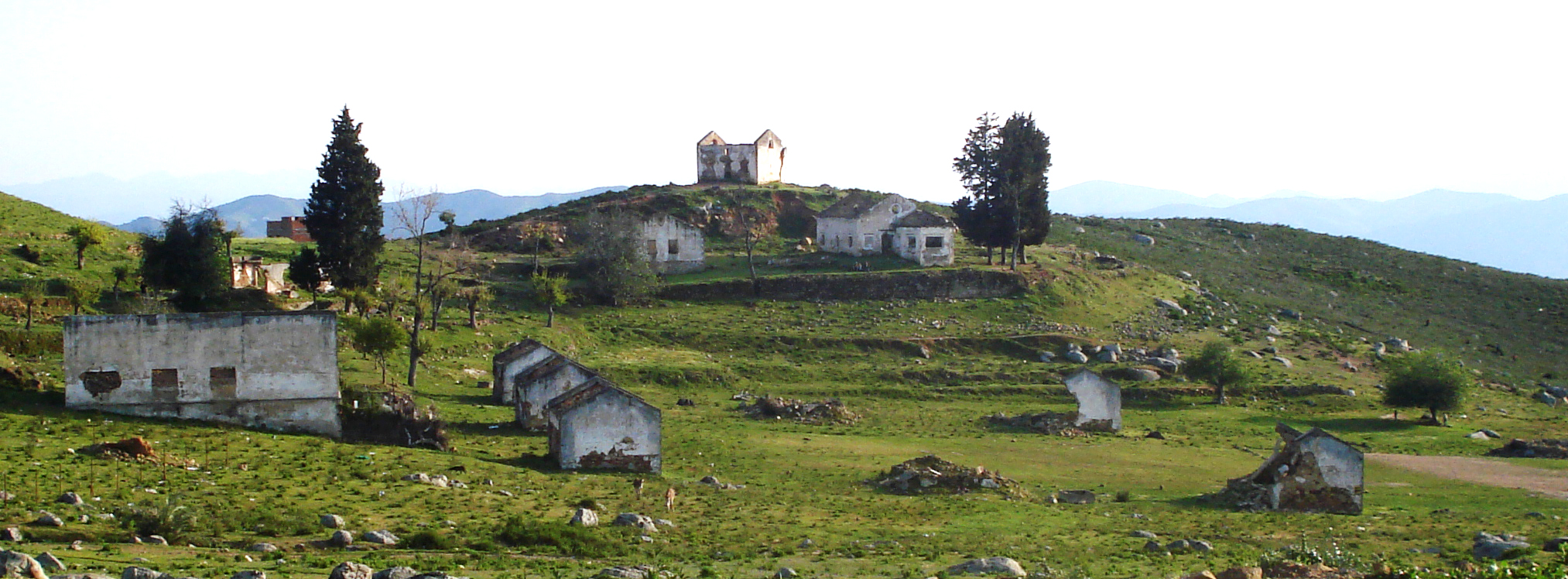
Ruins of a Spanish camp near Chefchaouen

The Rif War had starkly polarized Spanish society between the africanistas who wanted to conquer an empire in Africa vs. the abandonistas who wanted to abandon Morocco as not worth the blood and treasure. After the "Disaster of the Annual", Spain's war in the Rif went from bad to worse, and as the Spanish were barely hanging on to Morocco, support for the abandonistas grew as many people could see no point to the war. In August 1923, Spanish soldiers embarking for Morocco mutinied at the railway stations, other soldiers in Malaga simply refused to board the ships that were to take them to Morocco, while in Barcelona huge crowds of left-wingers had staged anti-war protests at which Spanish flags were burned while the flag of the Rif Republic was waved about.

With the africanistas comprising only a minority, it was clear that it was only a matter of time before the abandonistas forced the Spanish to give up on the Rif, which was part of the reason for General Miguel Primo de Rivera, seizing power in a military coup d'état on September 13, 1923. General Primo de Rivera was in the words of the American journalist James Perry a "moderate dictator" who was convinced that the divisions between the africanists vs. the abandonistas had pushed Spain to the brink of civil war, and who had seized power to find a way out of the crisis. General Primo de Rivera soon concluded that the war was unwinnable, and considered pulling back his troops to the coast with the aim of at least temporarily abandoning the Rif. In late July 1924, Primo de Rivera visited a Spanish Foreign Legion post at Ben Taieb in the Rif, and was served a banquet of eggs in different forms. In Spanish culture, eggs are a symbol of the testicles, and the dishes were intended to send a clear message. Primo de Rivera responded calmly that the army would be required to abandon only the minimum of territory and that junior officers should not dictate the measures necessary to resolve the Moroccan problem. However he subsequently modified the plans for withdrawal, pulling the Spanish forces back from Chefchaouen and the Oued Laou region to a prepared fortified boundary named the "Primo Line".

=== French intervention ===
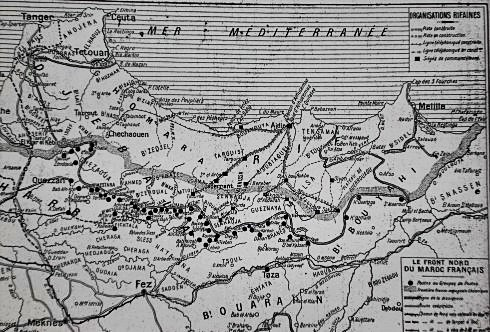
Contemporary map showing border and French military posts

In May 1924, the French Army had established a line of out-posts north of the Oureghla River in disputed tribal territory. On 12 April 1925, in an event known as the battle of Oureghla an estimated force of 8,000 Rifians attacked the line manned by 20,000 French soldiers and in two weeks over 48 of 66 French posts had been stormed or abandoned. French casualties exceeded 1,000 killed, 3,700 wounded and 1,000 missing – representing losses of over 20 percent of their forces deployed in the Rif. The French accordingly intervened on the side of Spain, appointing Marshal Philippe Pétain as commander-in-chief of an expeditionary force of up to 160,000 well-trained and -equipped troops from Metropolitan, Algerian, Senegalese and Foreign Legion units, as well as Moroccan regulars (tirailleurs) and auxiliaries (goumiers). With total Spanish forces at this point numbering about 90,000 the Rifian forces were now seriously outnumbered by their Franco-Spanish opponents. Final French deaths from battle and disease, in what had now become a major war, were to total 8,628.

On September 17, 1925, a squadron of American mercenary flyers in the service of France bombarded Chefchaouen.

== Outcome ==
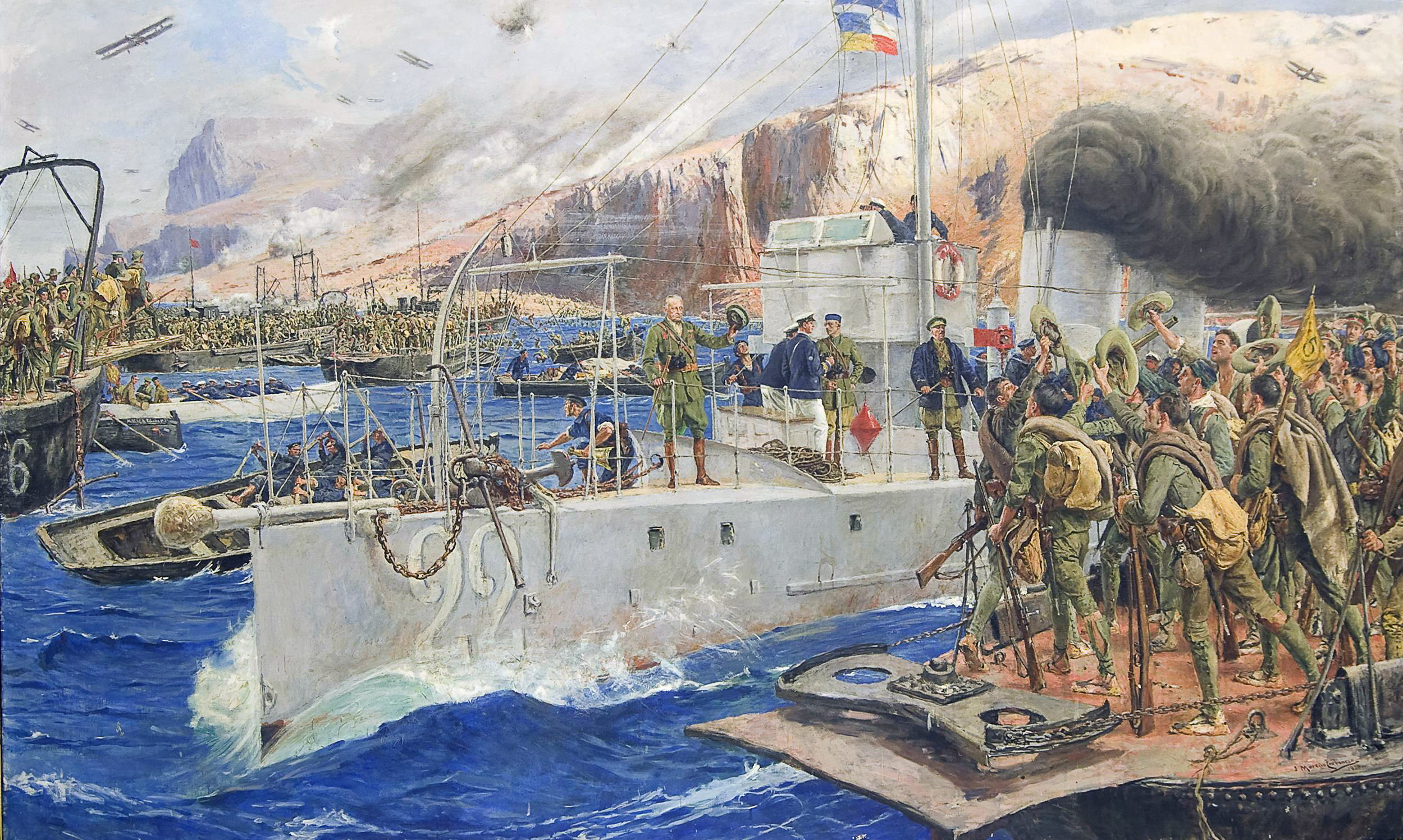
Desembarco de Alhucemas, 1929, an artistic interpretation of the Alhucemas landing, by Spanish painter José Moreno Carbonero

For the final attack commencing on 8 May 1925, the French and Spanish had ranged 123,000 men, supported by 150 aircraft, against 12,000 Rifians. Superior manpower and technology soon resolved the course of the war in favour of France and Spain. The French troops pushed through from the south while the Spanish fleet and army secured Alhucemas Bay by a landing operation in September 1925 (the first amphibious landing in history where tanks and seaborne air support were used) and began attacking from the north. After one year of bitter resistance, Abd el-Krim, the leader of the revolt, surrendered to French authorities on May 27, 1926. Even following Abd el-Krim's surrender, pockets of Rif resistance still remained, and the last of them in Akhmas was occupied by Spanish forces on July 9, 1927.

However, the unpopularity of the war in Spain and the earlier defeats of the Spanish military contributed to the instability of the Spanish government and the military coup of 1923.

== Atrocities ==
=== Massacre of Monte Arruit ===
On August 9, 1921, the Massacre of Monte Arruit occurred, in which 2,000 soldiers of the Spanish Army were killed after surrendering the Monte Arruit garrison near Al Aaroui following a 12-day siege. The atrocities subsequently committed by the Spanish Army of Africa were triggered by a 'compulsive spirit of revenge' of this and other massacres, and the desire to exact retribution on the rebel tribes.

=== Spanish atrocities and use of chemical weapons ===
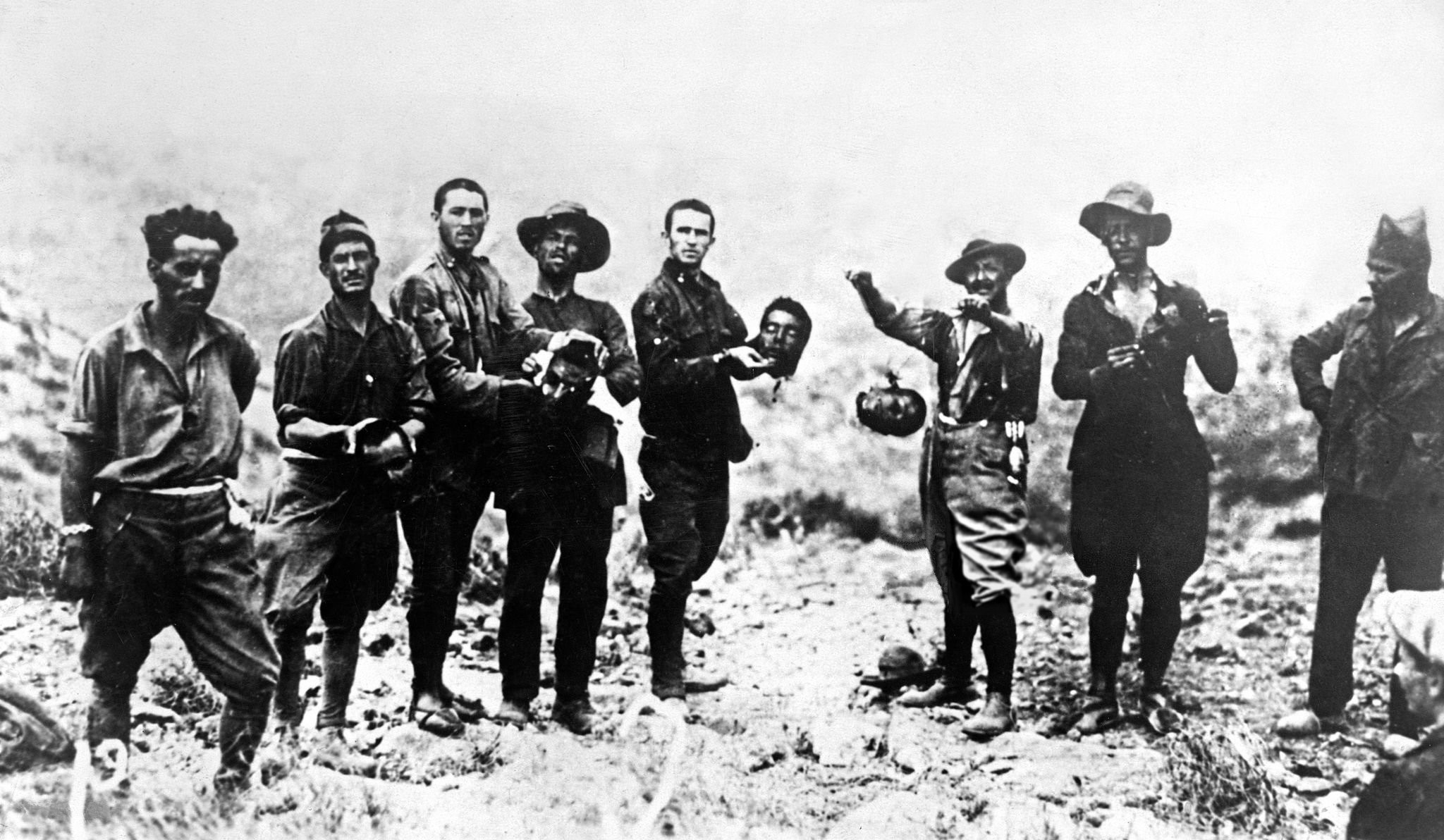
Spanish legionnaires holding up decapitated Moroccan heads, 1922

Beginning in 1924, the Spanish used chemical weapons during the conflict, which marked the first widespread employment of gas warfare in the post-WWI era. The Spanish army indiscriminately used phosgene, diphosgene, chloropicrin and mustard gas also against civilian populations, markets and rivers. While Spain signed the Geneva Protocol in 1925, which prohibited the use of chemical and biological weapons, such use was not illegal in internal conflicts.

Some have cited the Spanish chemical weapons as the main reason for a widespread cancer occurrence in the Rif region, which is still the highest in Morocco; for example, according to the Head of the Association of Toxic Gas Victims (ATGV) research has shown "there are strong indicators that the cancer is caused by the gases that were used against the resistance in the north." Writer Juan Pando, however, pointed out that areas of France and Belgium, which were gassed far more heavily during World War I, do not have abnormal cancer rates.

Miguel Alonso, Alan Kramer and Javier Rodrigo wrote in the book Fascist Warfare, 1922–1945: Aggression, Occupation, Annihilation: "Although the Rif War was no 'fascist' war, several methods used to 'pacify' the population were applied in the post-colonial reconquista of godless Republican Spain ... Apart from deciding not to use chemical weapons, Franco's campaign to 'cleanse Spain' resembled that in Morocco: intelligence-gathering through torture, summary executions, forced labour, rape, and the sadistic killing of military prisoners."

Both Spanish and Moroccan mutilations of hostages were also reported, including severing heads as retribution to the mutilations inflicted on the Spanish troops initially.

== In popular culture ==
- The Rif War directly inspired Sigmund Romberg's 1926 operetta The Desert Song, which was later adapted several times into motion pictures.
- The 1929 romance novel La riffaine, by Jewish-Algerian writer Elissa Rhaïs, was set during the Rif War.
- The 1927 novel Amy Jolly and the 1930 film Morocco adapted from it are set against the background of the Rif War.
- The action of the 1931 novel La Bandera by Pierre Mac Orlan is set during the Rif War. The novel was also turned into a 1935 movie.
- The 1951 film Ten Tall Men is set in the context of the Rif War.
- The 1977 Dick Richards film March or Die shows Foreign Legionnaires fighting Arab rebels led by "el-Krim" in the Rif in 1925.
- The 1998 film Legionnaire, starring Jean-Claude Van Damme, is set in the war in 1925, with Kamel Krifa playing Abd el-Krim.
- The 2017 television miniseries Morocco: Love in Times of War follows Spanish nurses during the Rif War.

== See also ==
- Zaian War, the 1914–21 conflict between the French and Berber tribesmen in Morocco.
- Kert campaign
