= Escadrille chérifienne =

American mercenary air unit that served France in the Rif War

- Sharif Squadron
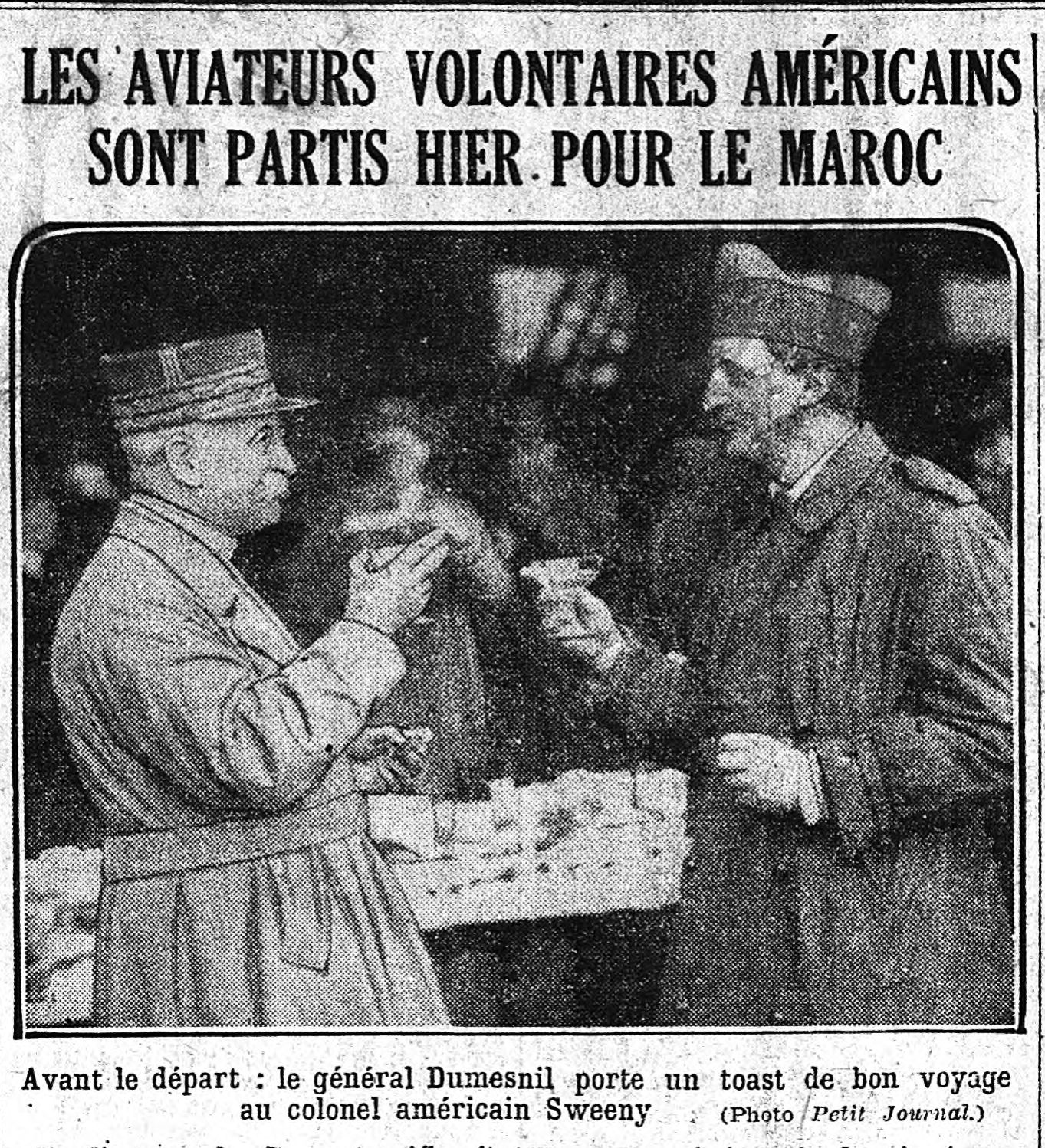
- from August 6, 1925. Translation: "The American volunteer pilots left yesterday for Morocco / Before departure: General Dumesnil gives the American colonel Sweeny a bon voyage toast."
- Active: 25 July 8 – 15 November 1925
- Country: United States
- Allegiance: France
- Branch: Moroccan Royal Guard
- Type: Air Force
- Size: 17 Pilots
- Nickname: Escadrille Américaine (American Squadron); Lafayette Squadron
- Engagements: Rif War

Commanders
- Notable commanders: Charles Sweeny

The Escadrille chérifienne (French; literally "Sharif squadron") or Escadrille américaine ("American squadron") was a air squadron affiliated to the Moroccan Royal Guard (Garde Chérifienne) under the French protectorate in Morocco during the Rif War (1924-26). It was recruited among mercenaries from the United States and commanded by Charles Sweeny.

== Formation ==
Colonel Charles Sweeny, an American pilot who had served in World War I, proposed organizing a squadron of American pilots to assist the French in Morocco, to French Prime Minister Paul Painlevé, who "warmly welcomed the Colonel’s request."

Seeking "volunteers," Sweeny sent a telegram to a number of World War I veterans in the US in June 1925. By July, he had 17 volunteers, 12 of whom were pilots, including Paul Ayres Rockwell, had served France in World War I. The American volunteers were inducted into the French Foreign Legion in July, and their squadron was named Escadrille Cherifienne, 19th Squadron of the Moroccan Aviation Regiment. It was legally attached to the Sultan's Guard, and not to French forces.

In a telegram to the French résident général in Morocco Hubert Lyautey, the Prime Minister and Minister of War of France Paul Painlevé said: "This American expression of solidarity seems particularly interesting at the moment and capable of bringing a share of American propaganda to our cause, strengthening American sentiment against the aggression of Abd el-Krim."

== Operations ==
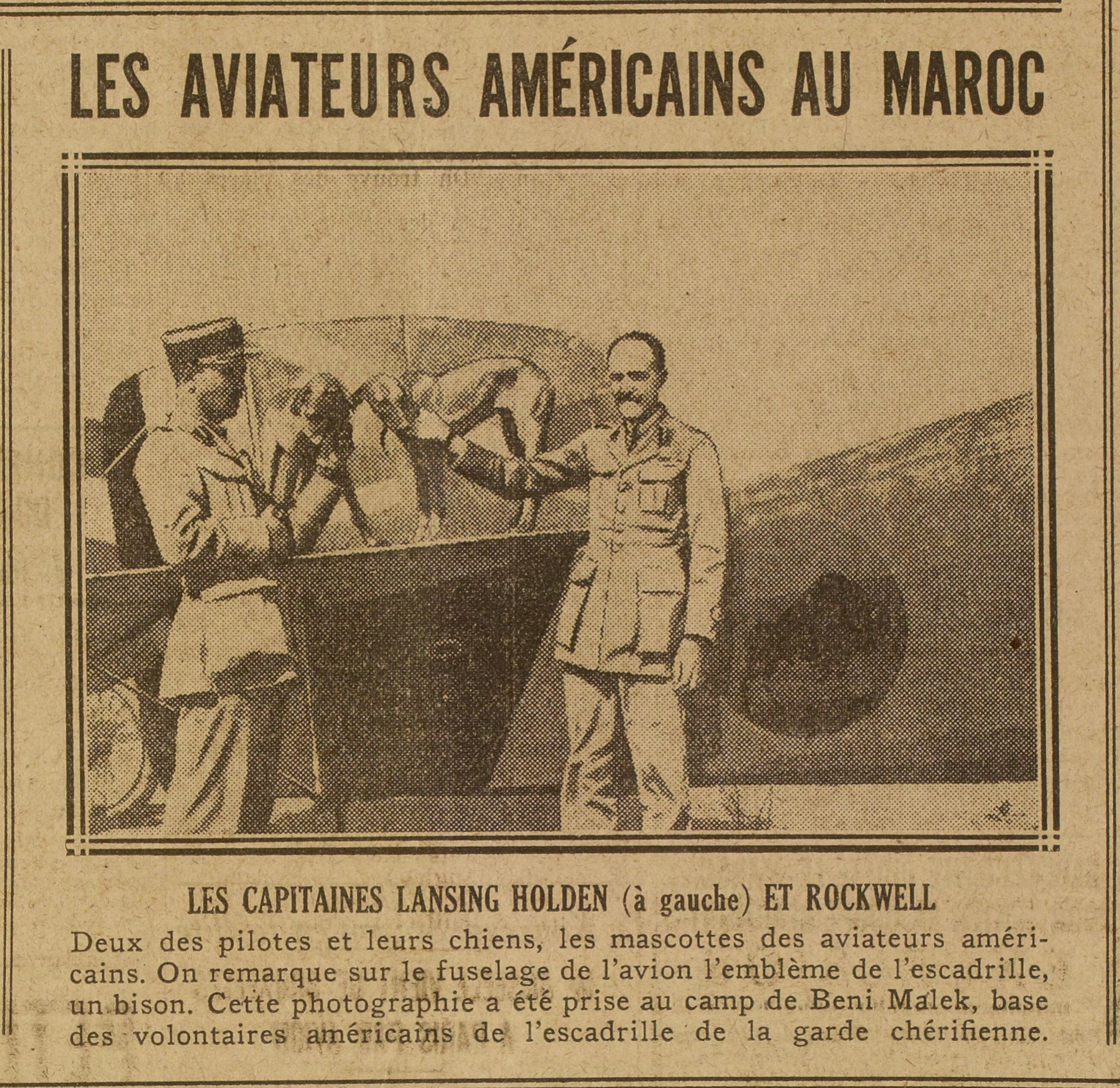
Paul Rockwell photographed at Beni Malek, where the escadrille was based. The image shows the escadrille's emblem: an American bison.

The unit was activated on August 7, 1925. It operated seven Bréguet 14 light bombers. The Squadron was assisted by a 59-man French ground crew.

In Morocco, the American volunteers of the Escadrille Cherifienne were based in Beni Malek. The Escadrille bombed the Moroccan city of Chefchaouen on September 17, 1925.

The Escadrille was cited at the order of the (French) Occupation Troops of Morocco on October 15, 1925.

The French Left also saw Rifian commander Abd el-Krim as a Republican leader fighting for liberty. The French aviators in Morocco and the French new commander Philippe Pétain disapproved the use of foreign mercenaries.

== American response ==
After learning about the mercenaries, the U.S. Department of State issued instructions to its consul in Morocco to warn the Americans that they would risk the revocation of their citizenship, imprisonment, and fines under the Neutrality Act of 1794 if they did not end their involvement in the war. Although the public reception to the mercenaries had initially been mixed back home, their involvement in bombing campaigns caused widespread outrage. The Literary Digest headlined the news as "U.S. bombs and Rif babies". The Pittsburgh Post-Gazette said it would've been one thing if the mercenaries were fighting for the Riffians, but that there was "nothing gallant or chivalrous in the rain of bombs, dropped on defenseless villages." The Christian Century, a leading Protestant magazine, remarked, "These American soldiers of fortune have no pretexts other than the exaltation of the manhunt. This is a royal sport and the fact that these women and children who have had the misfortune to be born in the Rif villages as victims has no more meaning for them than the death of a rabbit during a hunt."

The State Department repeated its threat to prosecute the pilots for violating American neutrality laws if they did not immediately cease their participation in the war, but the pilots rejected the warnings. After only six weeks of operations, however, France disbanded the squadron under diplomatic pressure by the United States. According to Marshal Philippe Pétain, the unit carried out 350 combat missions in six weeks and dropped more than 40 tons of ammunition. According to Lieutenant Colonel Charles Kerwood, the squadron had bombed villages and caused considerable civilian casualties. There was even a proven instance of the American squadron bombing a village that had surrendered.

Under diplomatic pressure from the United States, the Squadron was disbanded on November 15, 1925.

== Members ==
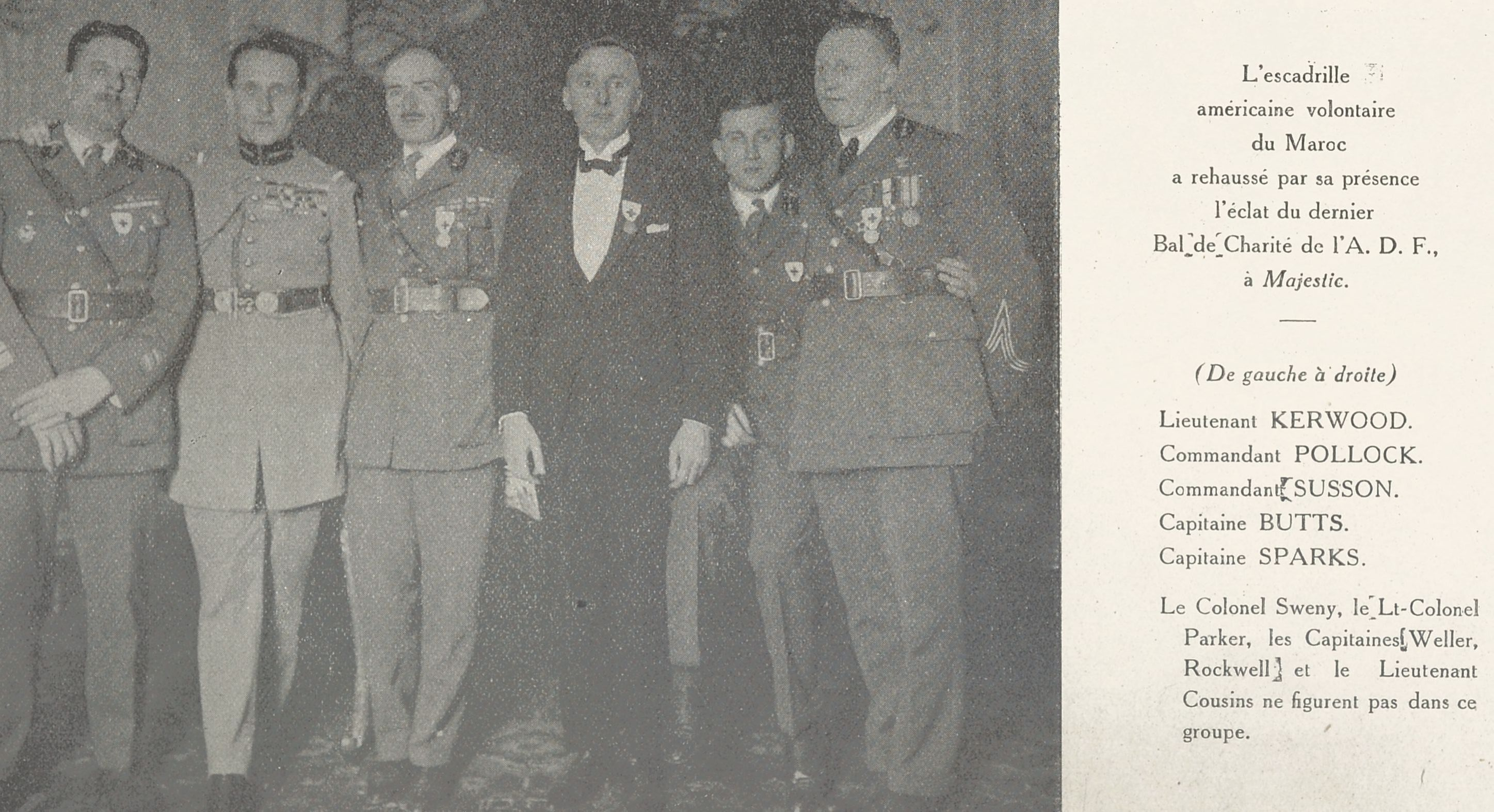
Photo of American members of the Escadrille Cherifienne, at a charity ball for the Association des Dames Françaises held at Majestic, December 12, 1925.

- Colonel Charles Michael Sweeny
- Captain Paul Ayres Rockwell
- Commander James Sussan/Susson, Canadian former commander pilot in the Royal Air Force of the United Kingdom
- Donald Mac Gibeny, former pilot of United States Air Force
- Captain Samuel J. Mustain, former pilot of United States Air Force
- Doctor James V Sparks, who enlisted as a medic
- Captain George Butts
- George Rehm
- Lieutenant Charles W. Kerwood
- Commander Grandville Pollock
- Lieutenant-Colonel Austin G. Parker
- Captain Reginald H. Weller
- Captain Graham
- Captain Lansing Colton Holden Jr.
- Captain William G. Bullin
- Lieutenant William S. Cousins

== Motivation ==
On the motivation of the rogue American volunteer pilots, Sweeny wrote, "In our view, France, in fighting Abdel Krim, is fighting the cause of the white man's civilization, and all who have formed this squadron know enough of the world to appreciate what the white man's civilization means."

Most of the pilots were interested in an adventurous life and the historian William Dean refutes the importance of the white supremacist views of the pilots.
