= La Bandera (novel) =

1931 novel by Pierre Mac Orlan

- Author: Pierre Mac Orlan
- Language: French
- Genre: Thriller novel
- Publication date: 1931
- Media type: Print

La Bandera is a 1931 French novel written by Pierre Mac Orlan.

== Synopsis ==
After committing a murder in Paris, Pierre Gilieth flees to Barcelona. Now destitute, he enlists in the Spanish Foreign Legion. Despite his fatalistic manner, he begins to fit in with his comrades as they embark for Morocco to fight in the Riff War. Once in North Africa, he falls in love and marries a local cabaret singer. His new life brings him a happiness he has never before known, but his past slowly catches up with him. He eventually seeks personal redemption by volunteering to join the doomed garrison of an outpost in the Atlas Mountains.

== Adaptation ==
In 1935, the novel was turned into a film La Bandera which was largely faithful to the book. It was directed by Julien Duvivier and starring Jean Gabin as the Legionnaire and Annabella as his wife. The film was made in the poetic realist style.

== Bibliography ==
- Coward, David. A History of French Literature: From Chanson De Geste to Cinema. John Wiley & Sons, 2008.
- Turk, Edward Baron. Child of Paradise: Marcel Carné and the Golden Age of French Cinema. Harvard University Press, 1989.
