= Port of Shadows =

1938 film by Marcel Carné

- original poster
- Directed by: Marcel Carné
- Written by: Jacques Prévert (scenario and dialogue); Pierre Mac Orlan (novel)
- Produced by: Gregor Rabinovitch
- Starring: Jean Gabin; Michel Simon; Michèle Morgan; Pierre Brasseur
- Cinematography: Eugen Schüfftan
- Edited by: René Le Hénaff
- Music by: Maurice Jaubert
- Production company: Franco London Films
- Distributed by: Osso Films (France); Film Alliance of the United States Inc. (US)
- Release date: 18 May 1938 (France)
- Running time: 91 min
- Country: France
- Language: French

Port of Shadows (French: Le Quai des brumes [lə kɛ de bʁym], "The dock of mists") is a 1938 French film directed by Marcel Carné. An example of poetic realism, it stars Jean Gabin, Michel Simon and Michèle Morgan. The screenplay was written by Jacques Prévert and based on a novel by Pierre Mac Orlan. The music score was by Maurice Jaubert. The film was the 1939 winner of France's top cinematic prize, the Prix Louis-Delluc.

According to Charles O'Brien, the film is one of the earliest to be called film noir by critics (1939, France).

== Plot ==
On a foggy night, Jean (Jean Gabin), an army deserter, catches a ride to the port city Le Havre. Hoping to start over, Jean finds himself in a lonely bar at the far edge of town. However, while getting a good meal and civilian clothes, Jean meets Nelly (Michèle Morgan), a 17-year-old who has run away from her godfather Zabel, with whom she lives. Jean and Nelly spend time together over the following days, but they are often interrupted by Zabel, who is also in love with her, and by Lucien, a gangster who is looking for Nelly's ex-boyfriend, Maurice, who has recently gone missing. Jean resents the intrusions of Lucien and twice humiliates him by slapping him. When Nelly finds out that her godfather killed Maurice out of jealousy, she uses the information to blackmail him and prevent him from telling the police that Jean is a deserter. Although the two are in love, Jean plans to leave on a ship for Venezuela. At the last minute Jean leaves the ship to say goodbye to Nelly; he saves her from the hands of Zabel, whom he kills. However, when they go out onto the street, he is shot in the back by Lucien and dies in her arms.

== Cast ==
- Jean Gabin as Jean
- Michel Simon as Zabel
- Michèle Morgan as Nelly
- Pierre Brasseur as Lucien
- Édouard Delmont as Panama
- Raymond Aimos as Quart Vittel
- Robert Le Vigan as Le peintre
- René Génin as Le docteur
- Marcel Pérès as Le chauffeur
- Léo Malet as Le soldat
- Jenny Burnay as L'amie de Lucien
- Roger Legris as Le garçon d'hôtel
- Martial Rèbe as Le client

== Style ==
The film is in the style that Carné was most associated with, poetic realism. Lucy Sante writes that "Port of Shadows possesses nearly all the qualities that were once synonymous with the idea of French cinema. Gabin—eating sausage with a knife or talking around a cigarette butt parked in the corner of his mouth or administering a backhanded slap to Brasseur—is the quintessential French tough guy, as iconic a figure as Bogart playing Sam Spade. Michèle Morgan, ethereal and preoccupied, may pale a bit in comparison to some of her sisters in Parisian movies of the time (Arletty, for example), but she comes to life in bed, in a scene you can’t imagine occurring in an American movie before 1963 or so. The hazy lights, the wet cobblestones, the prehensile poplars lining the road out of town, the philosophical gravity of peripheral characters, the idea that nothing in life is more important than passion—such things defined a national cinema that might have been dwarfed by Hollywood in terms of reach and profit but stood every inch as tall as regards grace and beauty and power."

== Reception ==
Frank S. Nugent in The New York Times wrote that the film is "one of the most engrossing and provocative films of the season"; according to him, "it's a thorough-going study in blacks and grays, without a free laugh in it; but it is also a remarkably beautiful motion picture from the purely pictorial standpoint and a strangely haunting drama. As a steady diet, of course, it would give us the willies; for a change it's as tonic as a raw winter's day." At the time of its release, the film was widely criticized for being too negative about the State and moral character of the French.

Over 60 years after its premiere, Lucy Sante, writing about the film for its DVD release by Criterion Collection, called the film a "definitive example of the style known as 'poetic realism'. The ragged outlines, the lowdown settings, the romantic fatalism of the protagonists, the movement of the story first upward toward a single moment of happiness and then down to inexorable doom—the hallmarks of the style had germinated in some form or other through the decade, but in Marcel Carné's third feature they came together as archetypes."

Danish director Carl Dreyer included Port of Shadows in his top 10 film list.

A scene from the film is seen projected in the 2007 Academy Award-winning dramatization of Ian McEwan's wartime tragic drama Atonement.

== Home media ==
Before July 2004, Criterion Collection gave the film a "bare-bones" release, with a booklet and limited on-screen special features; according to James Steffen of Turner Classic Movies, the DVD's "high-definition transfer does justice to Carné, Schufftan and Trauner's richly detailed vision", though there are issues because of the "highly variable" quality of the 35mm film used: "Within the same scene some shots can be startlingly clear, while others are very grainy and have much weaker contrast and detail. On the balance, it still looks extremely good for a film of this vintage." Steffen also noted the "mono sound is clear and without too much distortion. The characters use lots of colorful slang whose flavor is difficult to translate into English, but the subtitles do an admirable job."
