= Pierre Mac Orlan =

French novelist and songwriter (1882–1970)

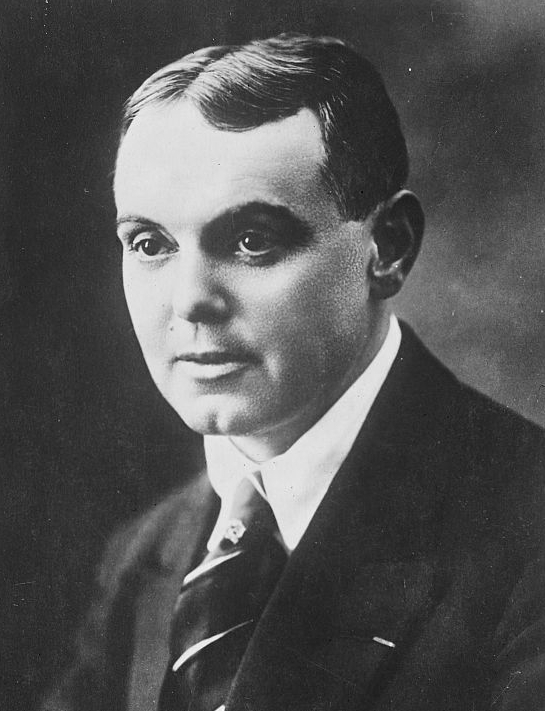
Pierre Mac Orlan

Pierre Mac Orlan, sometimes written MacOrlan (born Pierre Dumarchey; February 26, 1882 – June 27, 1970), was a French novelist and songwriter.

His novel Quai des Brumes was the source for Marcel Carné's 1938 film of the same name, starring Jean Gabin. He was also a prolific writer of chansons, many of which were recorded and popularized by French singers such as Juliette Gréco, Monique Morelli, Catherine Sauvage, Francesca Solleville, and Germaine Montero.

== Life ==
Born in Péronne, Somme, in northern France, Mac Orlan lived in Rouen and Paris as a young man, working at a variety of jobs and learning to play the accordion. In his twenties, he travelled widely in Europe, before returning to Paris and becoming a noted figure in bohemian art circles. In particular, his song performances were a regular feature at the Lapin Agile cabaret. During this period, he was part of a broad circle of writers and painters including Max Jacob, Guillaume Apollinaire, Maurice Utrillo and Francis Carco.

He fought in the war against Germany until wounded in 1916, after which he worked as a war correspondent. In later years he earned a living as a writer in Saint Cyr-sur-Morin, outside Paris. In the late 1920s he became an influential critic of film and photography, writing important essays about the work of Eugène Atget, Germaine Krull and others.

== Works ==
In addition to Quai des Brumes, his many novels included A Bord de l'Etoile Matutine, translated into English by Malcolm Cowley as On Board the Morning Star, and La Bandera (1931). Among the popular chansons written by Mac Orlan are "Fille de Londres", "Le Pont du Nord" and "Nelly". The French singer Germaine Montero released an extensive set of her interpretations of Mac Orlan songs on the CD Meilleur de Germaine Montero. Most recently, new English translations of his books A Handbook for the Perfect Adventurer, translated by Napoleon Jeffries (2013), and Mademoiselle Bambù, translated by Chris Clarke (2017), have been published in the United States by Wakefield Press.

Using his real name, Pierre Dumarchey, and various pseudonyms including: Docteur Fowler, Pierre du Bourdel, Pierre de Jusange, Sadie Blackeyes, Chevalier de X, and Sadinet, he was for several years a writer for Paris Sex-Appeal, and of pornographic novels, which frequently depicted flagellation and sado-masochism. These titles include: La Comtesse au fouet (1908), the story of a cruel dominatrix, Les Grandes Flagellées de l'histoire (1909), Lise Fessée (1910), Masochism in America (1910), Miss (1912), and Petite dactylo et autres textes de flagellation (1913). He told Pascal Pia that he used the Dumarchey name to upset an uncle of his who made his life hard.

== Influences and legacy ==
The French writer and political theorist Guy Debord, founder of the Situationist International was a constant reader of Mac Orlan's novels of urban adventure and "low life". The well-known photographer of New York in the 1930s Berenice Abbott was highly influenced by Mac Orlan's writings on the "fantastique" and the "social fantastique". The physicist Freeman Dyson, in his 2008 AMS Albert Einstein Lecture, interprets Mac Orlan's song "La Ville Morte" ("The Dead City") as an example of the "empty city archetype", a Jungian archetype as described by mathematician Yuri I. Manin.

== Filmography ==
- La Bandera, directed by Julien Duvivier (1935, based on the novel La Bandera)
- Port of Shadows, directed by Marcel Carné (1938, based on the novel Le Quai des brumes)
- Midnight Tradition, directed by Roger Richebé (1939, based on the novel La Tradition de minuit)
- Marguerite de la nuit, directed by Claude Autant-Lara (1955, based on the novel Marguerite de la nuit)

=== Screenwriter ===
- L'Inhumaine, directed by Marcel L'Herbier (1924)
- Le Choc en retour, directed by Georges Monca and Maurice Kéroul (1937)
- Voyage Without Hope, directed by Christian-Jaque (1943)
- François Villon, directed by André Zwoboda (1945)
