= Ghomara =

Ghomara may refer to:

- the Ghomara people
- the Ghomara language
