= Bombardment of Chefchaouen =

1925 bombardment

- Part of Rif War
Date	September 17, 1925
Location	Chefchaouen, Morocco

Belligerents
France: (United States) Escadrille Cherifienne	Republic of the Rif: Jebala Tribes

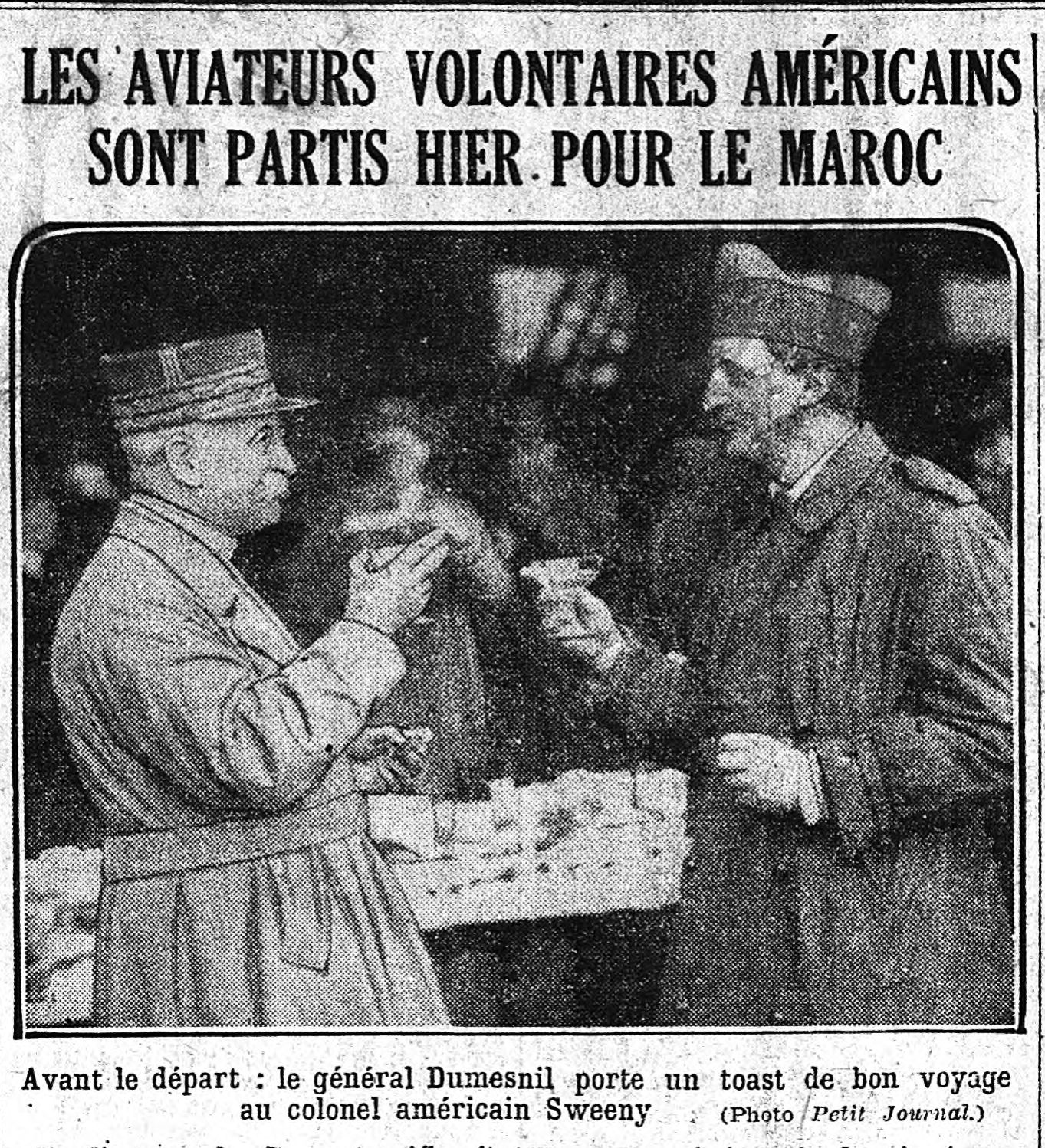
Front page of the Paris edition of Le Petit Journal from August 6, 1925. Translation: "The American volunteer pilots left yesterday for Morocco / Before departure: General Dumesnil gives the American colonel Sweeny a bon voyage toast."

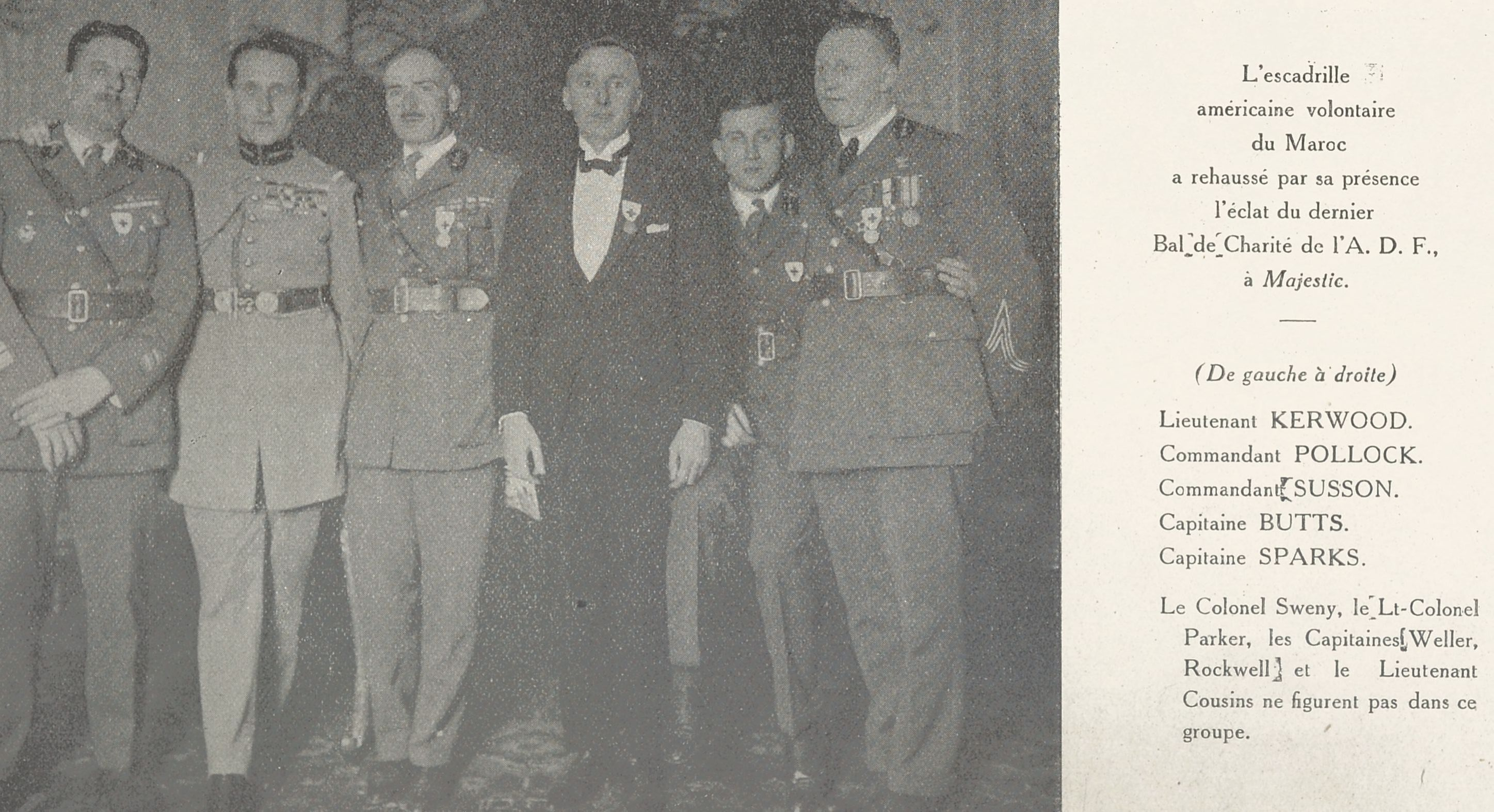
Photo of American members of the Escadrille Cherifienne, which carried out the bombardment of Chefchaouen, at a charity ball for the Association des Dames Françaises held at Majestic.

The Bombardment of Chefchaouen was an aerial bombardment of Chefchaouen, Morocco carried out in the middle of the Rif War by a rogue American squadron in the service of the French colonial empire, the Escadrille Cherifienne, on September 17, 1925. The bombing of Chefchaouen, in which civilians were largely the victims, was one of the first ever bombings of civilians by airplane in history.

== Motivation ==
The motivation to bomb Chefchaouen specifically was to drive the Jebala people out of the war, as it was a city the tribe considered holy.

== Reflections ==
Paul Ayres Rockwell later wrote: "The city looked lovely from the air, hugging its high mountain and surrounded with many gardens and green cultivations… I looked down upon the numerous sanctuaries, the six mosques, the medieval dungeon, the big square with its fountain playing and fervently hoped none of them had been damaged."
