= La Bandera (film) =

- Theatrical release poster
- Directed by: Julien Duvivier
- Written by: Pierre Dumarchais (novel); Charles Spaak; Julien Duvivier
- Produced by: André Gargour
- Starring: Annabella; Jean Gabin; Robert Le Vigan; Raymond Aimos; Pierre Renoir
- Cinematography: Jules Kruger
- Edited by: Marthe Poncin
- Music by: Roland Manuel; Jean Wiener
- Production company: Pathé-Joinville
- Distributed by: SNC
- Release date: 25 September 1935
- Running time: 96 minutes
- Country: France
- Language: French

La Bandera (released in the United States as Escape from Yesterday) is a 1935 French drama film directed by Julien Duvivier and starring Annabella, Jean Gabin and Robert Le Vigan. It was based on the 1931 novel La Bandera by Pierre Mac Orlan. After committing a brutal murder in Paris, a Frenchman flees to Barcelona where he enlists in the Spanish Foreign Legion. He is sent to fight in Morocco where he unexpectedly bonds with his comrades and marries a local woman before his past begins to catch up with him. Like Duvivier's other works of the period, the film is infused with poetic realism.

The film was made at the Joinville Studios in Paris with sets designed by the art director Jacques Krauss. Location shooting took place in Barcelona and at barracks in Tetuán in Spanish Morocco.

== Plot ==
Curfew bells are ringing at night in Paris, while a man and his drunken girlfriend Jacqueline walk down the street. Pierre Gilieth comes out of house #25 looking very frightened, both Pierre Gilieth and Jacqueline accidentally collide while consumed in their distraction. Pierre Gilieth decides to walk away but leaves a streak of blood on Jacqueline's dress. Immediately, she realizes her dress is stained with blood and gasps. The film cuts to his peering through Venetian blinds in Barcelona. A detective follows him around town, while Pierre Gilieth meets with fellow Frenchmen in a bar, who pick his pocket to give his identifications away to the detective. When Pierre Gilieth finds out he tries to fight the thieves, but then refuses to have the police investigate the matter.

Now at the end of his resources, having been rejected as a sailor on a merchant ship, he decides join the Spanish Foreign Legion on seeing a placard. The story is just before the Spanish Civil War, as the top of the placard reads "Spanish Republic" and "Law of 17 July 1934". Many of his fellow legionnaires have joined from destitution (and their pay will be five Pesetas), but the Frenchman Fernando Lucas, played by Robert Le Vigan, has money not only for cigarettes but for barhopping. The other legionnaires are on the impression that the money is being sent by his mother and that the reason for his joining the legion was his desertion from the French Army. When Lucas drops his identification card which he quickly hides, Gilieth becomes wary that Lucas is hiding something. Gilieth follows the advice from his best friend Mulot (Milo in the Spanish issue), played by Raymond Aimos, to pick Lucas pocket in the night to read it; but fails.

Thus Gilieth feeds a newspaper clipping that he had been carrying around, announcing a 50,000 Franc reward for the capture of the culprit of the "Crime of Rue St-Vincent", to the swine in the base pen; hoping to get rid of the dark memories it brings. Lucas shows up and invites him to get a drink, but soon in the bar Lucas manages to anger Gilieth to the point of a fist fight. Shortly after, his unit of legionnaires the bandera is ready to move south, Gilieth is able to convince his captain, played by Pierre Renoir, to have Lucas transferred to another location on account of violation of personal space. Indeed, once the bandera departs, the detective from Barcelona comes and talks to Lucas.

Mulot tries to cheer Gilieth up by bringing him to a local establishment with dancing girls. There he meets Aisha la Slaoui, a native who is portrayed by Annabella with marks on her forehead and chin; and immediately falls in love with her. He proposes to her as soon as he finds it appropriate, and their gypsy wedding ceremony involves their mutually making a cut in their mate's forearms and licking blood from it.

Wishing to get away from Lucas, Gilieth plans to escape with her to her people in the south at Rabat, to become one of them; but still he needs to deal with Lucas. Until that time, he commands her to lie about her love for him and to entertain Lucas, even doing whatever he asks until he tells her who he really is. Lucas tries to get Aisha to leave Gilieth and be his woman. Gilieth confronts them together and tells Aisha to spit Lucas' in the eye; which she does. Then he tells Lucas to come with him outside to settle the matter like men. Aisha gives Lucas a coin, one of her jewelry pieces, to remember her by in case something happens to him.

Lucas and Gilieth have a heated confrontation, where Lucas pulls out a knife and Gilieth is able to grasp Lucas' knife, but spares his life. There he admits that he killed a man, and says that he has given up his notion of escape with Aisha. Lucas tells Gilieth that he will surely be sleeping in jail that very night. Gilieth then shows two cartridges, telling him that he will first shoot Lucas and then himself during combat which will take place soon.

As the men finish their talk, they hear the horn from their crew to take places. An unexpected uprising needs to be put down, for which task both Gilieth's and Lucas' banderas will be required. No legionnaire wants to volunteer to be one of the twenty-four who are to hold a small outpost in advance of the main force, until the captain says that he will command it himself. Immediately they all step forward, except Lucas, who pauses a moment. The sergeant then picks the first twelve on the left and on the right, which includes the main cast.

The scene which follows has many of the stereotypes of this genre, of which the most important is that no Moroccan combatant is ever depicted; they are presented as supremely concealed snipers. Plot elements involve poisoned water and men who try to get to a safe supply but who only get shot for their valor. A fighter plane appears and several of the unit get shot either by "friendly fire" or, as the legionnaires surmise, by an enemy pilot. Captain Weller, sensing he only has a few minutes to live, tells Gilieth to take over. At this point Lucas informs Captain Weller, that he is a police spy as shown on his identification card. The captain is furious, and tells him to leave the men alone, and that as he is not a real legionnaire; he should depart if he should survive. Shortly after, the captain dies of heat stroke and exhaustion. The only two who remain are Gilieth and Lucas, as the main force charges up the hill, their machine guns blazing to sweep the enemy from their positions.

Yet at this moment of victory, Gilieth gets shot by a sniper, leaving Lucas to answer the roll call of the twenty-four with "Killed in action" for all except for Gilieth, who was "Promoted on the battlefield to corporal and killed in action". He himself is "Present". Returning to Aisha, he gives her back her coin, saying that Gilieth died thinking about her.

== Reception ==
Writing for The Spectator in 1935, Graham Greene praised the film, calling it "an intelligent melodrama saved from triteness by the character of the police spy". Greene particularly praised the "effective opening" scene of the film, offering it as "an excellent illustration of the main advantage the film possesses over the ordinary stage play; the means it has to place the drama in its general setting" – an advantage Greene attributed to the "exactitude and vividness" of the camera when compared to prose.

The film was the most popular non-English talking movie shown in Australia.
