= Beni Malek =

Beni Malek بني مالك
- Rural commune and town
- Location within Morocco
- Coordinates: 34°46′48″N 05°38′33″W
- Country: Morocco
- Region: Rabat-Salé-Kénitra
- Province: Kénitra

Population (2004)
  - Total: 43,282
- Time zone: UTC+0 (GMT)

Beni Malek is a small town and rural commune in Kénitra Province of the Rabat-Salé-Kénitra region of Morocco. At the time of the 2004 census, the commune had a total population of 43,282 people living in 6,895 households.
