= Jean Gabin =

French actor and singer (1904–1976)

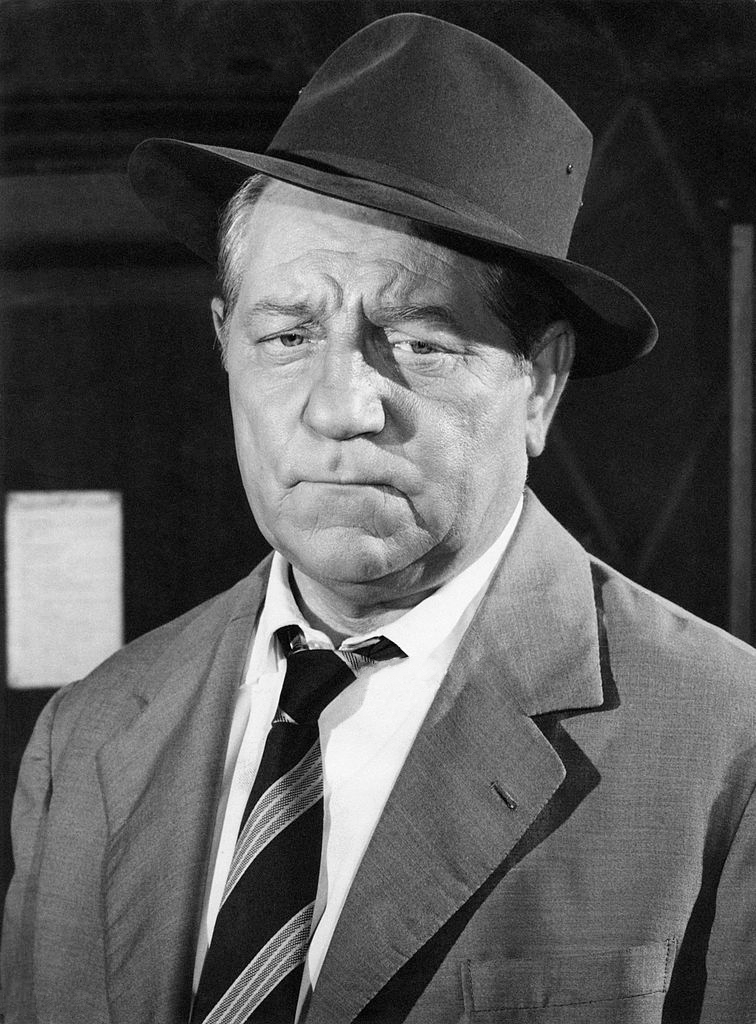
- Jean Gabin as Jules Maigret in 1958
- Born: Jean-Alexis Moncorgé; 17 May 1904; Paris, France
- Died: 15 November 1976 (aged 72); Neuilly-sur-Seine, France
- Occupations: Actor; singer
- Years active: 1923–1976
- Spouse(s): Gaby Basset (1925–30); Suzanne Marguerite Jeanne Mauchain (1933–39); Dominique Fournier (1949–76)

Jean Gabin Alexis Moncorgé (born Jean-Alexis Moncorgé), known as Jean Gabin (French: [ʒɑ̃ gabɛ̃]; 17 May 1904 – 15 November 1976), was a French actor and singer. Considered a key figure in French cinema, he starred in several classic films, including Pépé le Moko (1937), La grande illusion (1937), Le Quai des brumes (1938), La bête humaine (1938), Le jour se lève (1939), and Le plaisir (1952). During his career, he twice won the Silver Bear for Best Actor from the Berlin International Film Festival and the Volpi Cup for Best Actor from the Venice Film Festival, respectively. Gabin was made a member of the Légion d'honneur in recognition of the important role he played in French cinema.

== Biography ==
=== Early life ===
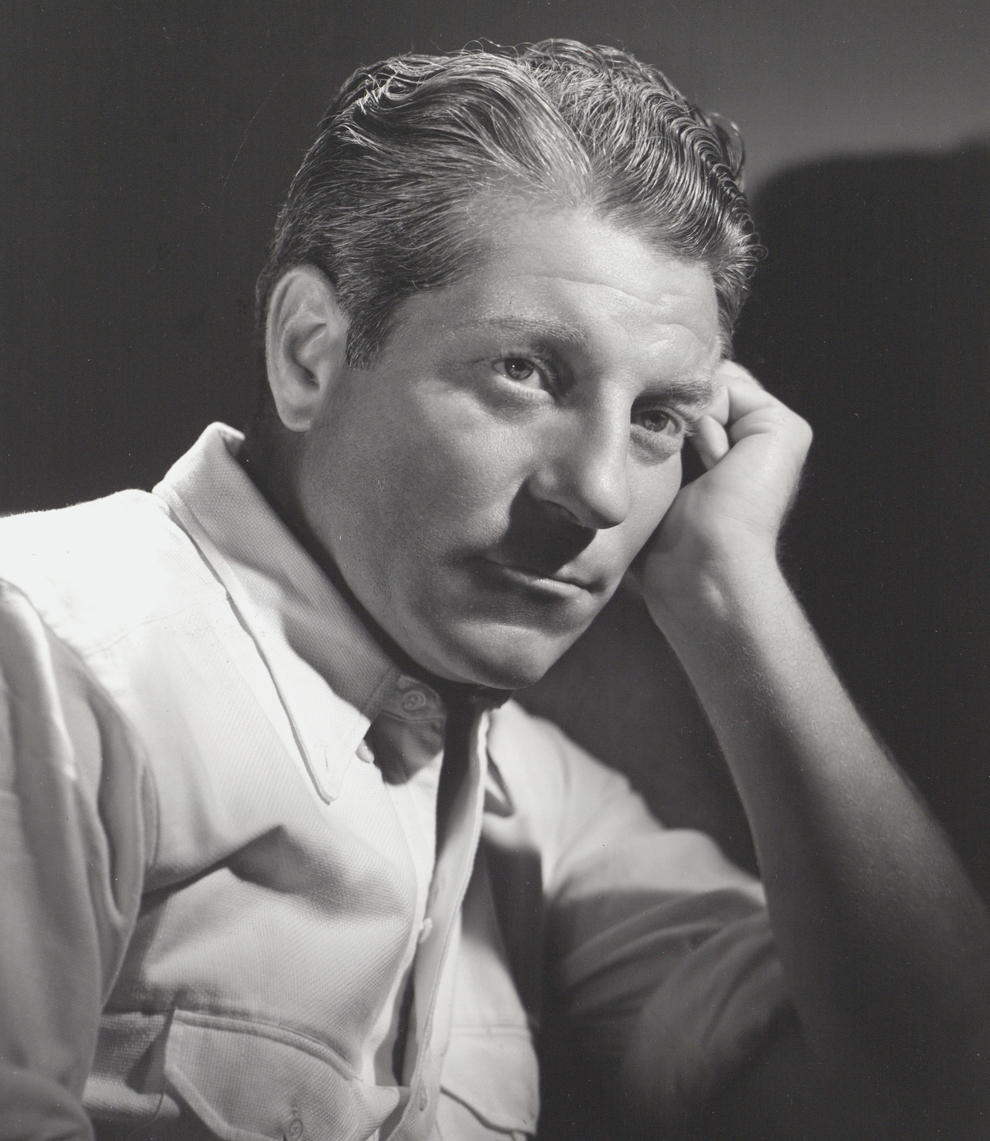
Jean Gabin, c. 1941

Gabin was born Jean-Alexis Moncorgé in Paris, the son of Madeleine Petit and Ferdinand Moncorgé, a cafe owner and cabaret entertainer whose stage name was Gabin, which is a first name in French. He grew up in the village of Mériel in the Seine-et-Oise (now Val-d'Oise) département, about 22 mi (35 km) north of Paris. He attended the Lycée Janson de Sailly. Gabin left school early, and worked as a laborer until the age of 19 when he entered show business with a bit part in a Folies Bergère production. He continued performing in a variety of minor roles before going into the military.

=== Career ===
==== Early days ====
After completing his military service in the Fusiliers marins, he returned to the entertainment business, working under the stage name of Jean Gabin at whatever was offered in the Parisian music halls and operettas, imitating the singing style of Maurice Chevalier, which was the rage at the time. He was part of a troupe that toured South America, and upon returning to France found work at the Moulin Rouge. His performances started getting noticed, and better stage roles came along that led to parts in two silent films in 1928.

Two years later Gabin made the transition to sound films in a 1930 Pathé Frères production, Chacun sa chance. Playing secondary roles, he made more than a dozen films over the next four years, including films directed by Maurice and Jacques Tourneur. But he only gained real recognition for his performance in Maria Chapdelaine, a 1934 production directed by Julien Duvivier. He was then cast as a romantic hero in the 1936 war drama La Bandera; this second Duvivier-directed film established him as a major star. The next year he teamed up with Duvivier again in the highly successful Pépé le Moko. Its popularity brought Gabin international recognition. That same year he starred in Jean Renoir's La Grande Illusion, an antiwar film that ran at a New York City theatre for an unprecedented six months. This was followed by another of Renoir's major works, La Bête Humaine (The Human Beast), a film noir tragedy based on the novel by Émile Zola and starring Gabin and Simone Simon, as well as Le Quai Des Brumes (Port of Shadows), one of director Marcel Carné's classics of poetic realism. His rugged charisma could be compared with Humphrey Bogart and James Cagney.

He divorced his second wife in 1939.

==== Hollywood ====
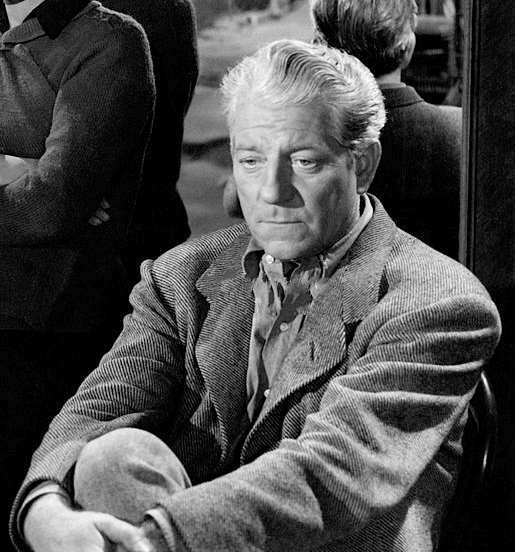
Gabin in The Walls of Malapaga (1949)

In the late 1930s Gabin was flooded with offers from Hollywood, but turned them all down until the outbreak of World War II. After the German occupation of France in 1940, he joined Renoir and Duvivier in the United States. During his time in Hollywood, Gabin began a romance with actress Marlene Dietrich that lasted until 1948. His films in America—Moontide (1942) and The Impostor (1944), the latter with Duvivier—were not successful.

==== World War II action ====
Undaunted, Gabin joined General Charles de Gaulle's Free French Forces and earned the Médaille militaire and a Croix de Guerre for his wartime valor fighting with the Allies in North Africa. Following D-Day, Gabin served with the 2nd armored division that liberated Paris.

==== Career slump ====
In 1945 Carné chose Gabin to star in the film Gates of the Night with Dietrich as his co-star. She disliked the screenplay and feared her German accent would not go over well with postwar French audiences. When she withdrew from the project, Gabin followed suit, leading to a falling out with Carné. He found a French producer and director willing to cast him and Dietrich together, but the film, Martin Roumagnac, was not a success and their personal relationship soon ended. In 1948 Gabin starred in René Clément's poetic realist film The Walls of Malapaga (Au-delà des grilles), which won an Oscar for Best Foreign Language Picture but garnered little recognition for Gabin. In 1949 he starred in his only role in legitimate theatre in Henri Bernstein's La Soif. It ran in Paris for six months, with Gabin critically praised as "a first-rate stage actor." Despite this recognition, his subsequent films did not do well at the French box office, and the next five years brought repeated failures.

==== Comeback ====
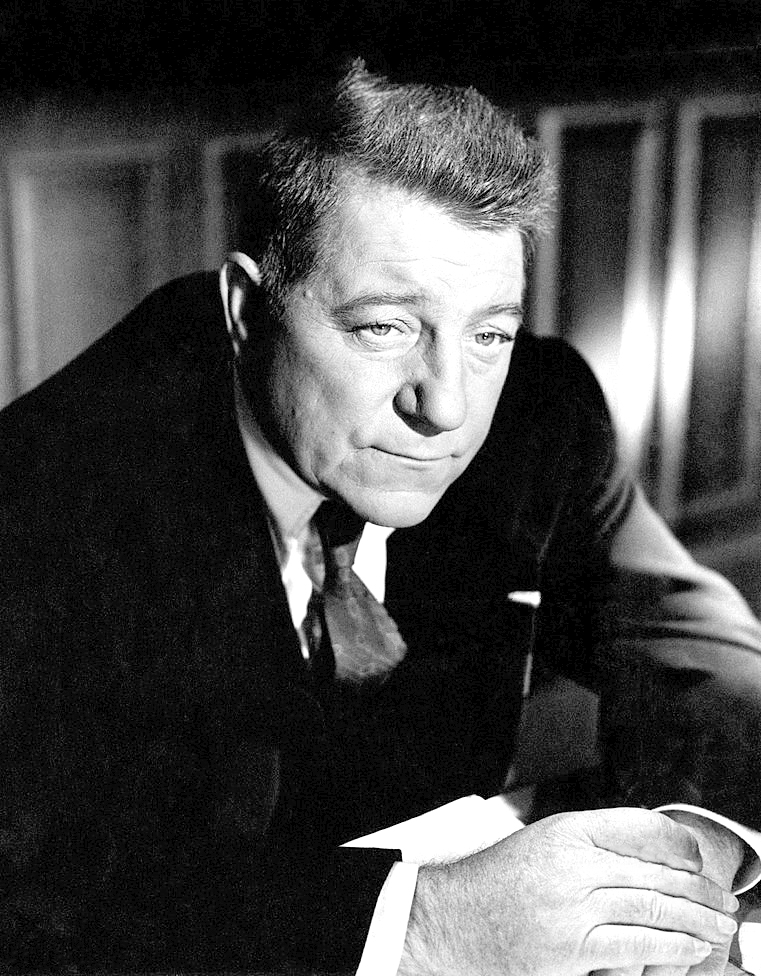
Gabin in The Little Rebels (1955)

Gabin's career seemed headed for oblivion until the 1954 film Touchez pas au grisbi (Don't Touch the Loot), directed by Jacques Becker, earned him critical acclaim. The film was very profitable internationally. He then worked once again with Renoir in French Cancan, with María Félix and Françoise Arnoul. Gabin played Georges Simenon's detective Jules Maigret in three films in 1958, 1959 and 1963. Over the next 20 years, he made almost 50 more films, most of them very successful commercially and critically, including many for Gafer Films, his production partnership with fellow actor Fernandel. His co-stars included such leading figures of postwar cinema as Brigitte Bardot (En cas de malheur), Alain Delon (Le Clan des Siciliens, Mélodie en sous-sol and Deux hommes dans la ville), Jean-Paul Belmondo (Un singe en hiver) and Louis de Funès (Le Tatoué).

=== Death ===
Gabin died of leukemia at the American Hospital of Paris, in the Parisian suburb of Neuilly-sur-Seine. His body was cremated, and—with full military honours—his ashes were scattered at sea from a military ship.

== Legacy ==
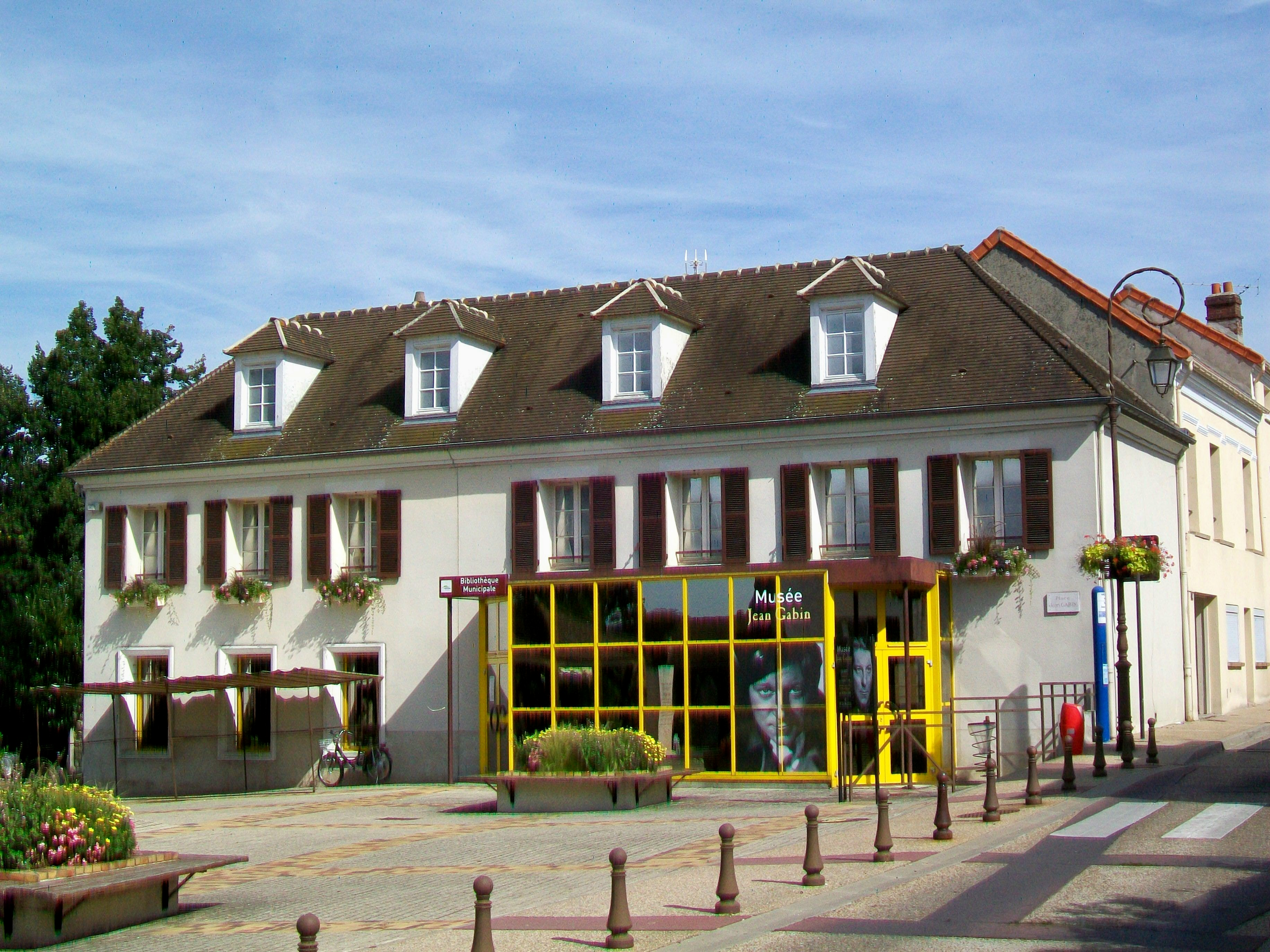
The Musée Jean Gabin

- Gabin is considered one of the greatest stars in French cinema, and was appointed Officier de la Légion d'honneur.
- In 1981, French actor Louis de Funès initiated the Prix Jean Gabin, an accolade presented to upcoming actors in the French film industry. It was awarded annually from 1981 to 2006.
- The Musée Jean Gabin—in the commune of Mériel, where he grew up—narrates his story and features his film memorabilia.
- The Place Jean Gabin was inaugurated on 16 May 2008 by Daniel Vaillant, the then mayor of the 18th arrondissement of Paris, and Gabin's children. It is on the corner of rue Custine and rue Lambert, at the foot of Montmartre.
- The Cinema Jean Gabin in Montgenèvre was named for him. Montgenèvre describes itself as France's oldest ski resort, and was a popular holiday destination for Gabin and other French artists and intellectuals, including Jean-Paul Sartre.
- Gabin bought land in Orne, most notably Bonnefoi and Moulins-la-Marche, where a street is named in his honour and the race track he created, Hippodrome Jean Gabin, still bears his name.
- The character Scopper Gaban from the manga One Piece is named after him.
- His name is the basis for the name of the Japanese television series Space Sheriff Gavan.
